= Kia Rio =

Subcompact car produced by Kia (1999–2023)

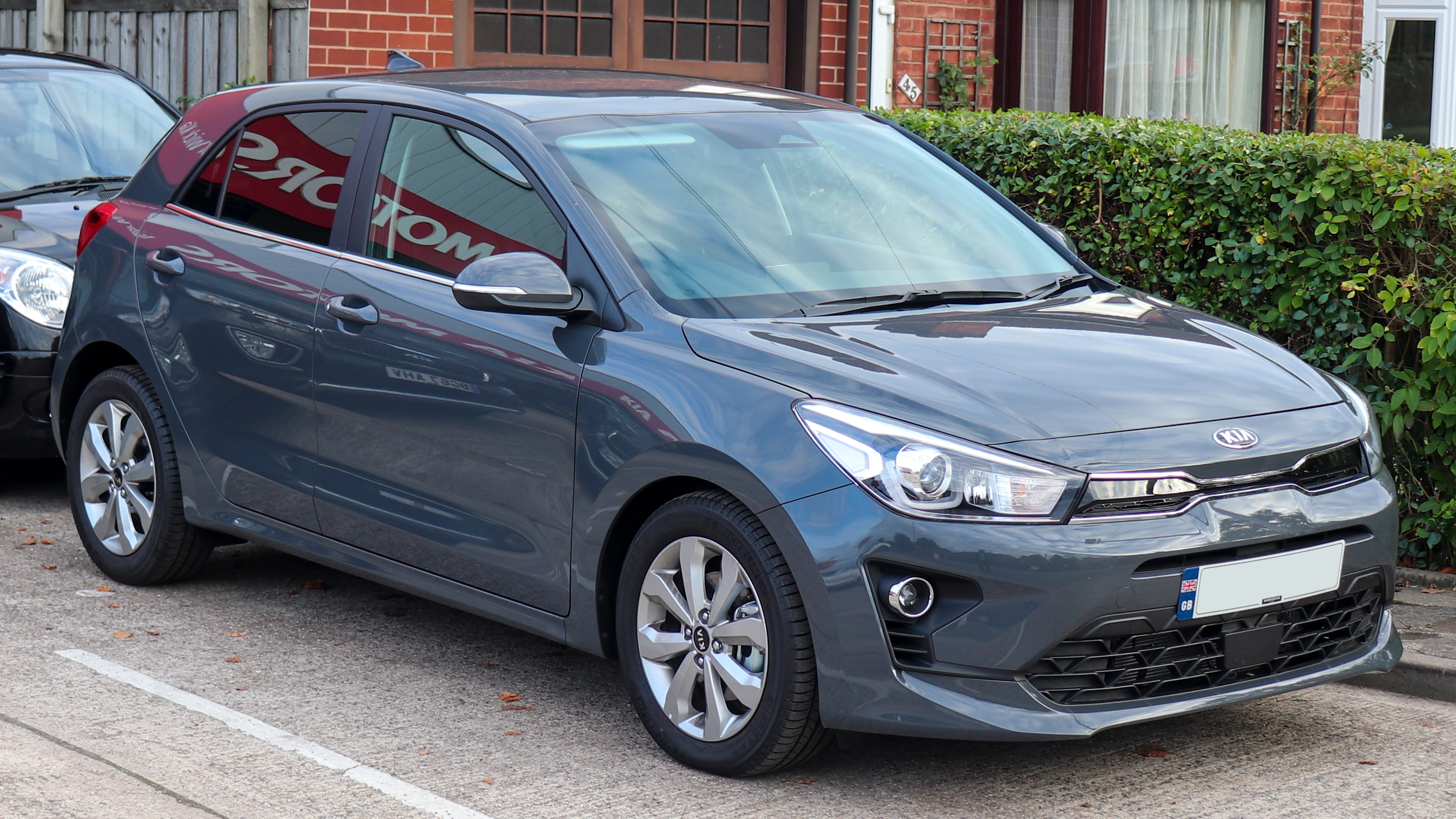
- Fourth generation Kia Rio

Overview
- Manufacturer: Kia
- Also called: Kia Pride (2005–2017); Kia K2 (China; 2011–2020)
- Production: November 1999 – December 2023
- Model years: 2001–2023 (North America)

Body and chassis
- Class: Subcompact car (B)
- Body style: 3-door hatchback (2011–2017); 5-door hatchback 4-door sedan/saloon 5-door station wagon (1999–2005)
- Layout: Front-engine, front-wheel-drive

Chronology
- Predecessor: Kia Pride; Kia Avella
- Successor: Kia K3 (BL7)

The Kia Rio (Korean: 기아 리오) is a subcompact car manufactured by Kia, produced from 1999 to 2023.

Body styles have included a three and five-door hatchback and four-door sedan, equipped with inline-four gasoline and diesel engines, and front-wheel drive.

The Rio replaced the first-generation Pride—a rebadged version of the Ford Festiva—and the Avella, a subcompact sold as a Ford in some markets. A second generation was introduced in 2005 in Europe and in 2006 in North America, sharing its platform with the Hyundai Accent, a subcompact manufactured by its sister Hyundai Motor Company in South Korea.

In August 2023, the K3 was introduced as its successor in several markets such as Mexico and the GCC countries.

== First generation (DC; 1999) ==
First generation
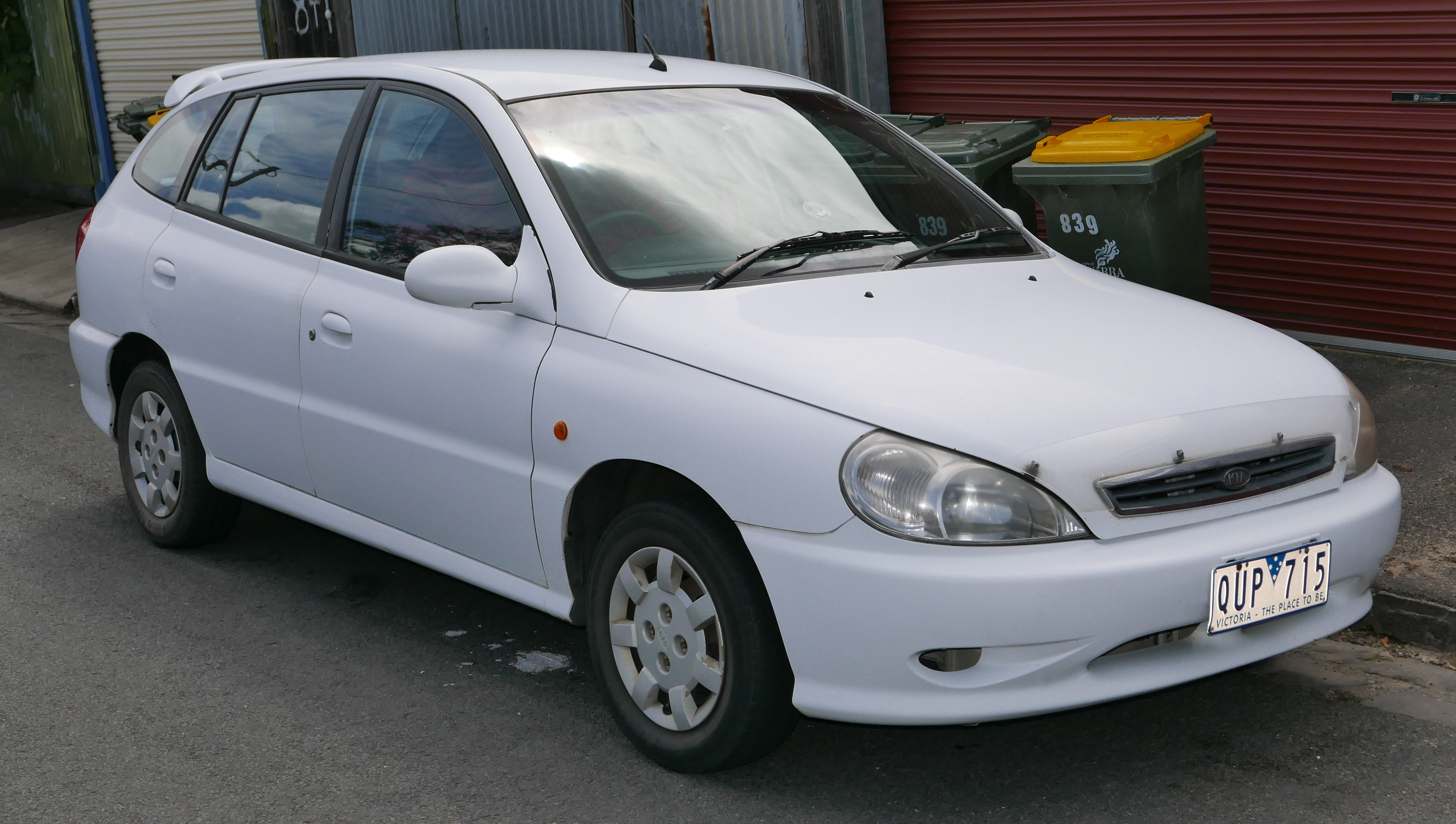
- Wagon (pre-facelift)

Overview
- Model code: DC
- Production: November 1999 – 2005 (South Korea); 2001–2013 (Ecuador); 2005–2012 (Iran)
- Model years: 2001–2005 (North America)
- Assembly: South Korea: Gwangmyeong (Sohari Plant); Ecuador: Quito (AYMESA); Iran: Tehran (SAIPA); Russia: Kaliningrad (Avtotor)
- Designer: Justyn Norek at I.DE.A Institute

Body and chassis
- Body style: 4-door sedan 5-door station wagon

Powertrain
- Engine: 1.3 L Mazda B3 I4 (petrol); 1.5 L Mazda B5-DE I4 (petrol); 1.6 L Mazda B6 I4 (petrol)
- Transmission: 5-speed manual 4-speed Mazda F4A-EL automatic

Dimensions
- Wheelbase: 2,410 mm (94.9 in)
- Length: 4,215 mm (165.9 in) (2000–02); 4,240 mm (166.9 in) (2002–05)
- Width: 1,675 mm (65.9 in) (2000–02); 1,680 mm (66.1 in) (2002–05)
- Height: 1,440 mm (56.7 in)
- Curb weight: 1,019–1,256 kg (2,247–2,769 lb)

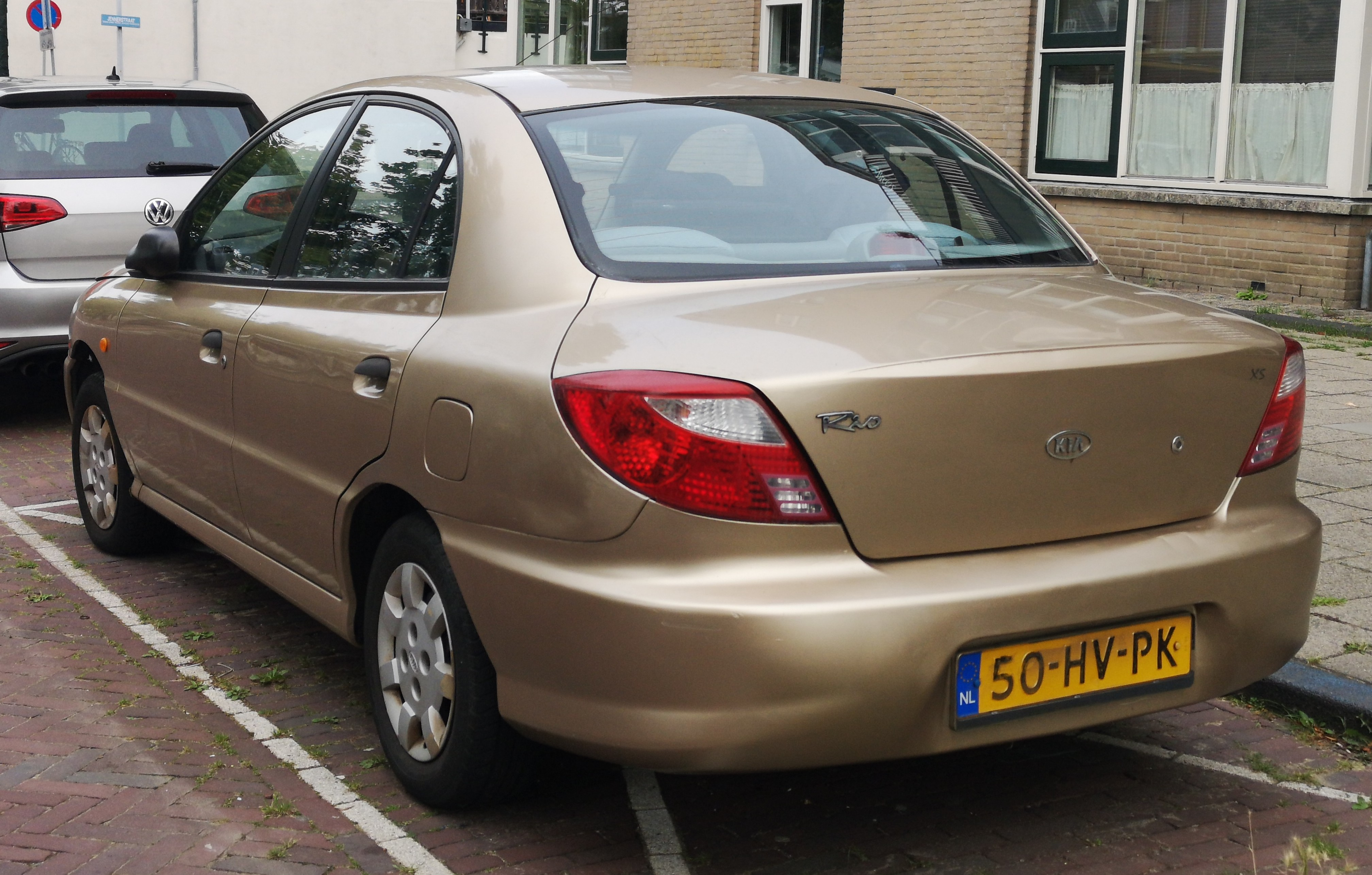
Sedan (pre-facelift)

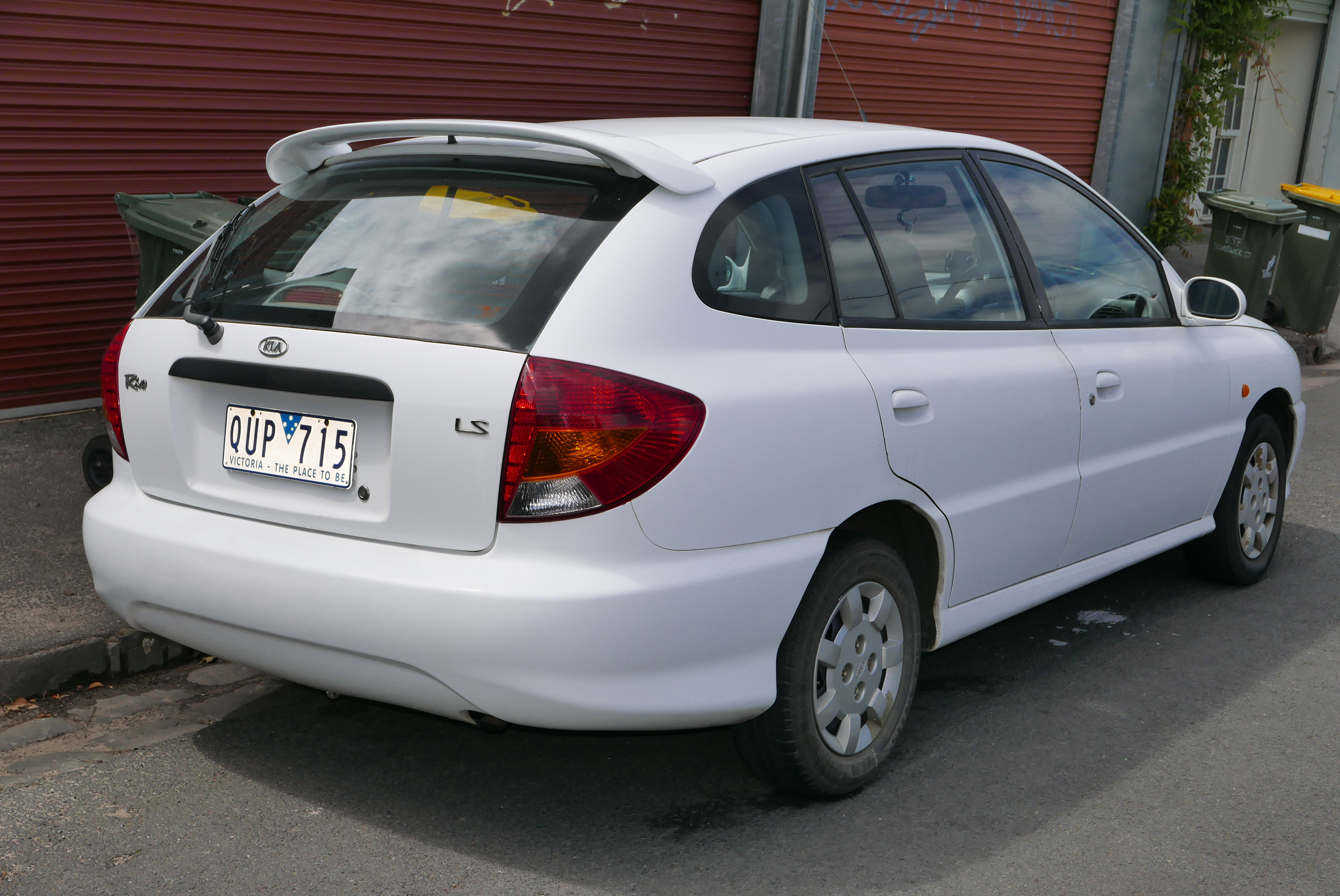
Wagon (pre-facelift)

The first generation Kia Rio (referred internally as the "DC") was offered in both four-door sedan and five-door station wagon body styles. When released, it was the least-expensive mass-produced car to be sold in the United States. While the Rio's styling and affordability were well-received, it was derided for its poor build quality and driving experience.

The station wagon was marketed as the "Rio Cinco" in the United States, "Rio RX-V" in Canada, and "Rio Look" in Chile. The sedan/saloon version was not sold in the United Kingdom, and the station wagon/hatchback was known as the "Rio" there. In Greece, both versions were sold as the "Rio". In South Korea, this was the only generation to use the "Rio" name, as the "Pride" name was used from the second generation onwards.

The first generation Rio offered only one engine for each model year in the United States: a 96 hp (72 kW) 1.5-litre DOHC I4 gasoline engine from 2001 through 2002. Then a larger version appeared, a 1.6-litre DOHC four-cylinder rated at 104 hp (78 kW) used for model years 2003 through 2005. All years offered a choice of a five-speed manual transmission or a four-speed F4A-EL automatic. An alternative of a 1.3-litre (1,343 cc) SOHC four-cylinder/eight-valve petrol, producing 75 hp (56 kW) was offered in some other countries, including the United Kingdom and most of continental Europe. The USA-version five-door featured power steering and a tachometer, optional on the sedan. The European version was marketed under several trim levels; standard equipment for all trims included a driver airbag. Additional features were available for promotion in Greece, including leather seats and car alarm. In Europe, the various national markets received different selections of the three engines.

The domestic Korean market versions did not include the 1.6-liter version, as the South Korean taxation system heavily penalizes cars of more than 1,500 cc. Claimed outputs for the domestic versions (JIS) were higher, at 84 PS (62 kW) for the little 1.3 and 108 PS (79 kW) for the DOHC 1.5. For the SOHC 1.5 95 PS (70 kW) was claimed. The first generation hatchback was marketed as the Rio RX-V in South Korea.

Safety features included seat belts and an airbag for the driver. ABS was available as an option for entry-line cars but fitted by default for top of the range models (i.e., Rio LX, in the UK, and Rio LS, in Greece).

There was a version called the Sports-Pac, which featured a bonnet scoop, a rear wing, golden wheels, and blue paint, all inspired by the Subaru Impreza WRX STi. Mechanically the Sports-Pac was identical to regular models, with the exception of lowered suspension.

=== Facelift ===
In 2002, the Rio received a mild redesign (for the 2003 model year in the US) including upgrades in engine, suspension, brakes, and new exterior and interior styling. After this 2002 facelift, the entire range received the "Rio SF" moniker in the domestic South Korean market, with "SF" standing for both "Science Fiction" and "Safety First".

In Europe, the facelifted Rio received minor changes in external look and engine improvement of the 1.3 from 75 hp (56 kW) to 80 hp (60 kW) at 5,500 rpm, and 86 lb⋅ft (117 N⋅m) at 3,000 rpm.

Iranian production of the facelifted Rio by SAIPA began in 2005. The cars were not equipped with ABS or airbags until 2012, powered by a version of the 1.5 litre engine which produces 96 hp (72 kW) at 5,500 rpm and 135 N⋅m (100 ft⋅lbf) torque at 4,500 rpm. In early 2012, the production ended.

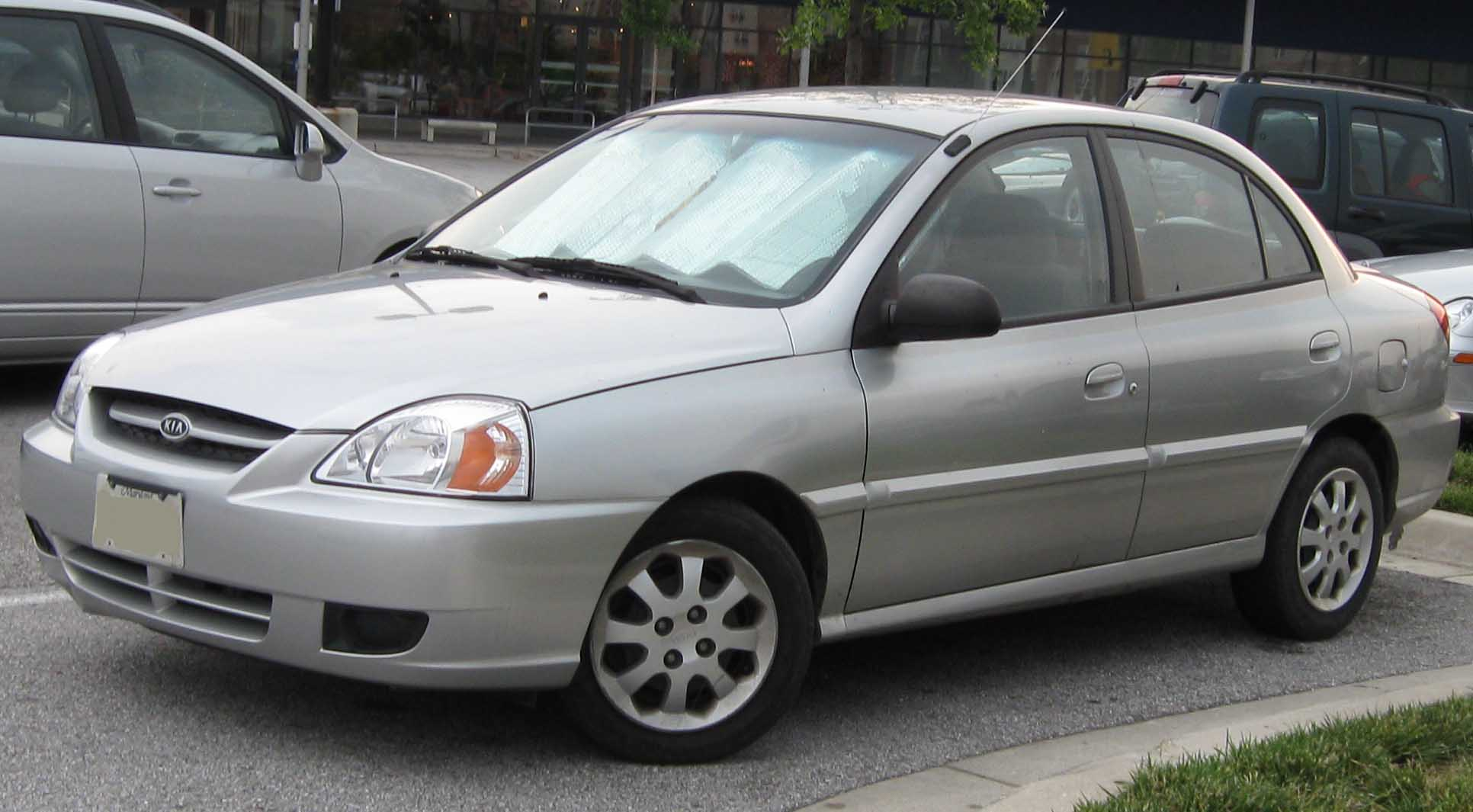
Sedan (facelift)

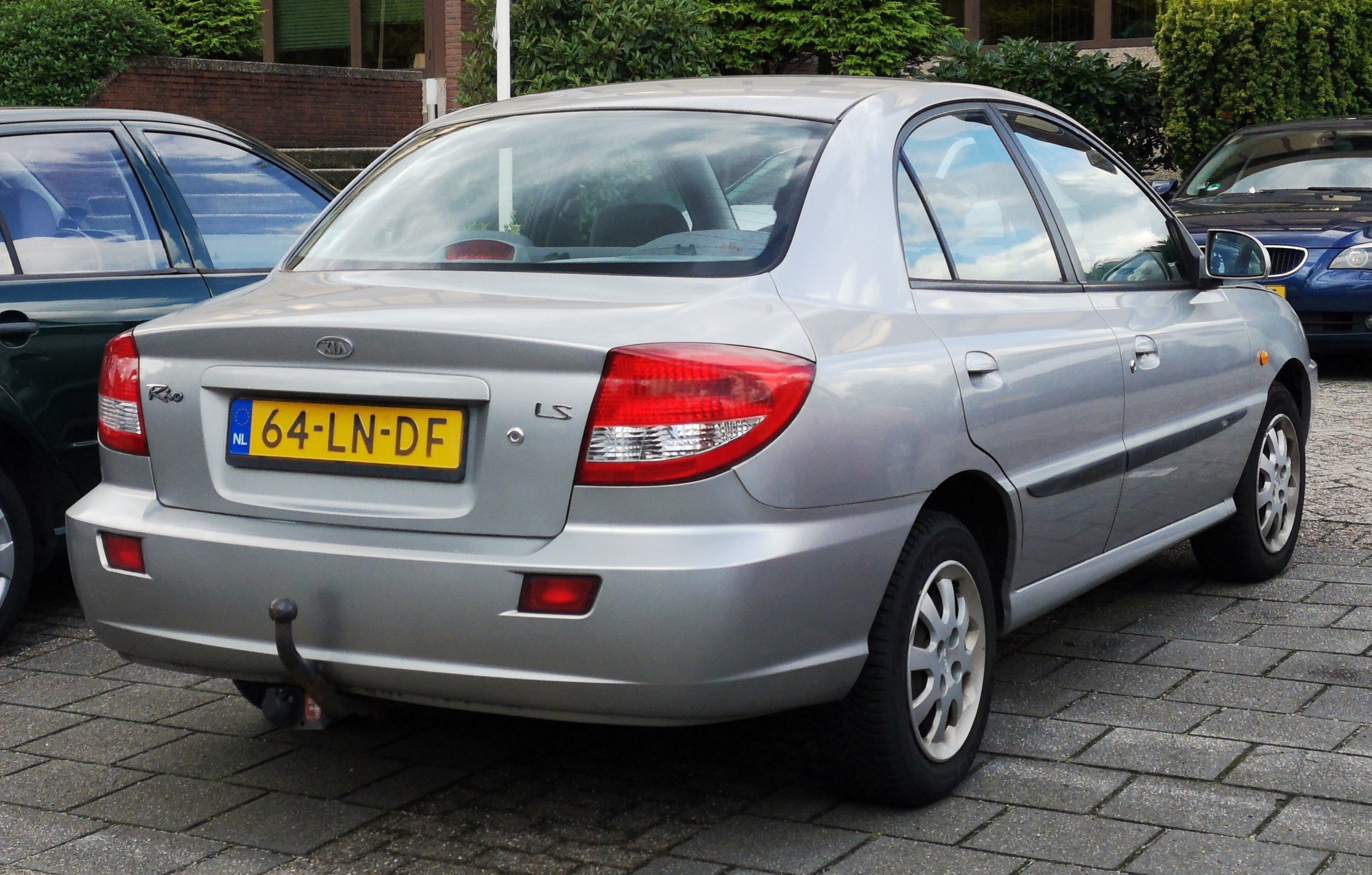
Sedan (facelift)

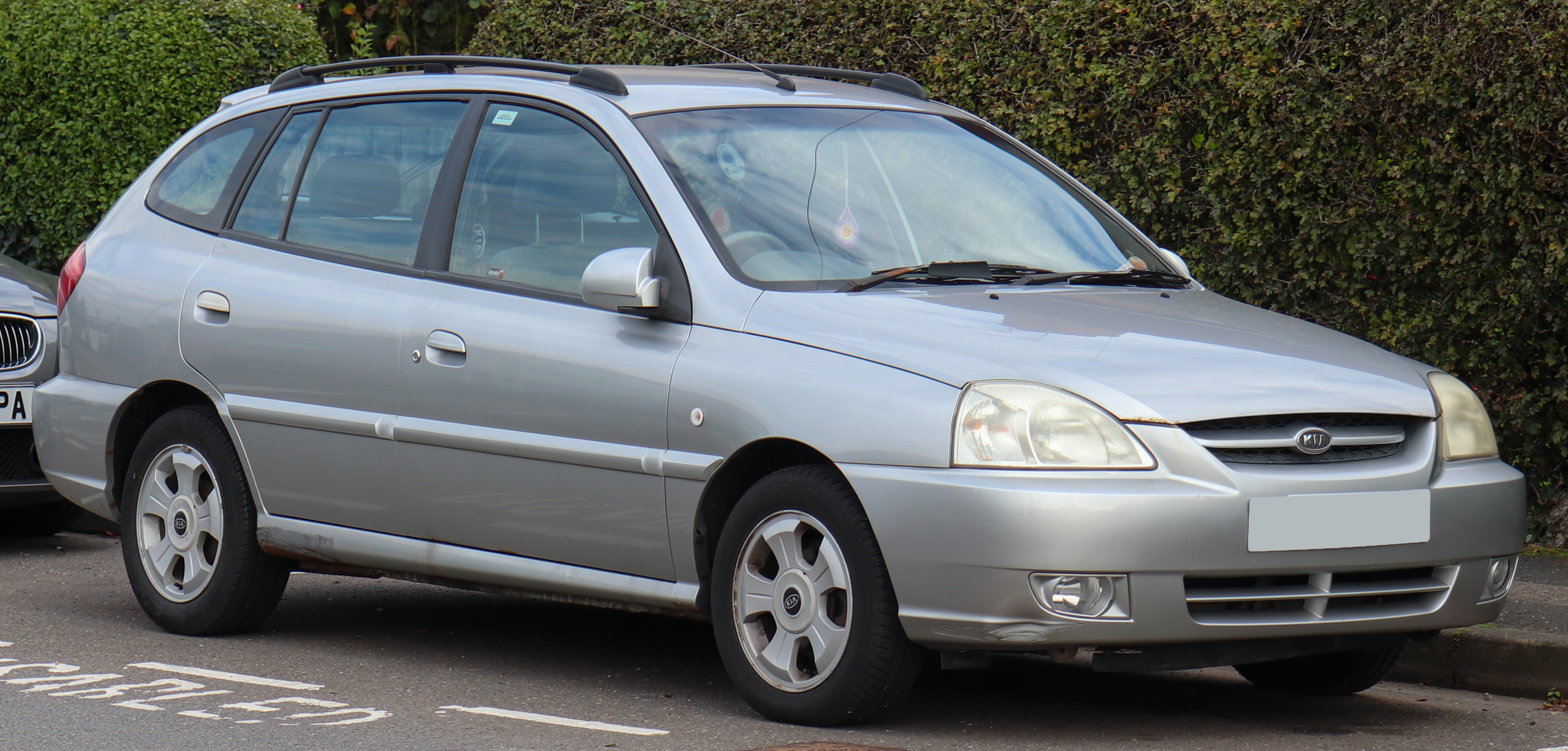
Wagon (facelift)

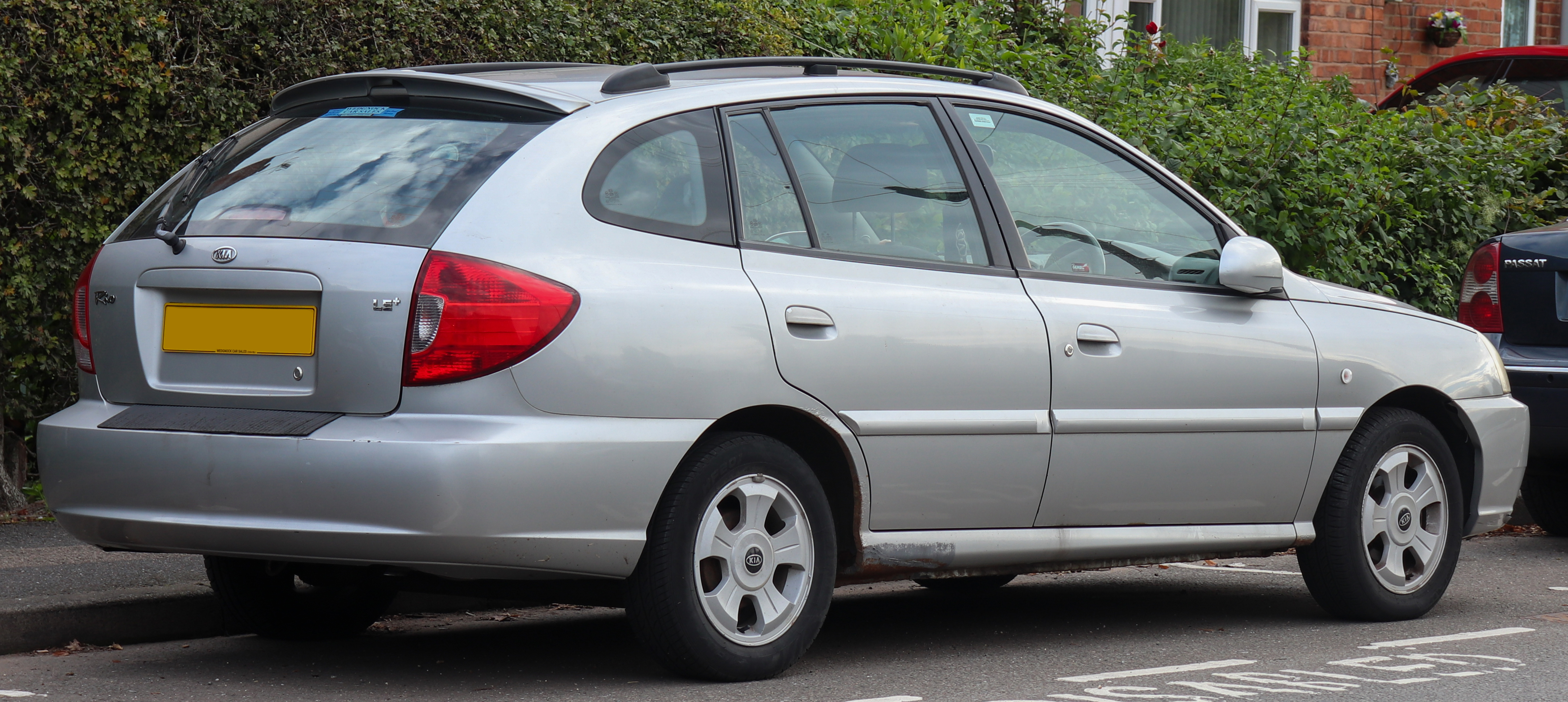
Wagon (facelift)

== Second generation (JB; 2005) ==
Second generation
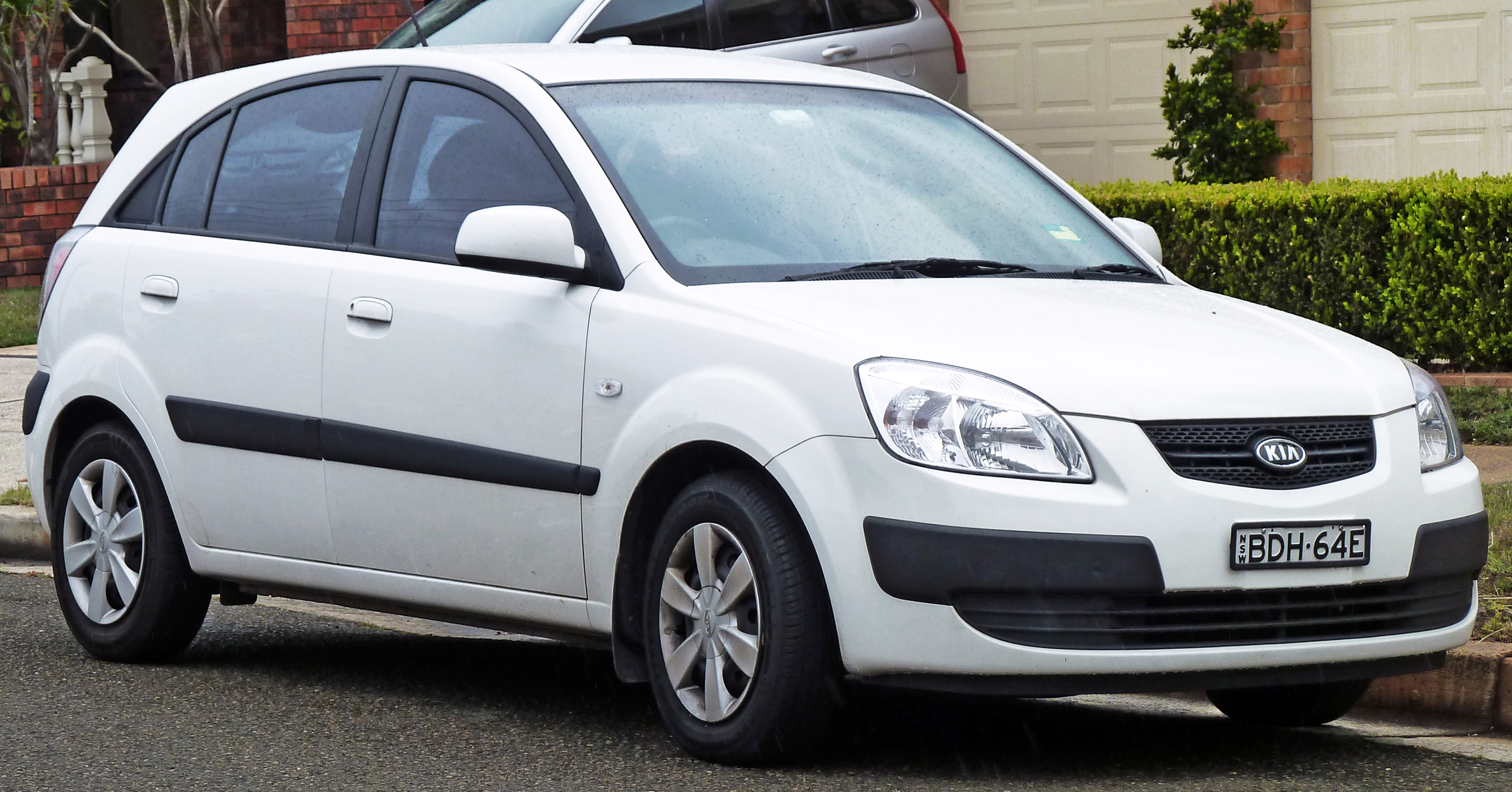
- Hatchback (pre-facelift)

Overview
- Model code: JB
- Also called: Kia Pride; Kia Sephia Sport (Colombia, taxi version)
- Production: 2005–2011
- Model years: 2006–2011 (North America)
- Assembly: South Korea: Gwangmyeong (Sohari Plant); China: Yancheng (Yancheng Plant); Russia: Izhevsk (IzhAvto)

Body and chassis
- Body style: 5-door hatchback 4-door sedan
- Related: Hyundai Accent (MC)

Powertrain
- Engine: 1.4 L Hyundai G4EE Alpha II DOHC CVVT I4 (petrol); 1.6 L Hyundai G4ED Alpha II DOHC CVVT I4 (petrol); 1.5 L Hyundai U-Line CRDi-VGT I4 (turbo diesel)
- Transmission: 5-speed manual 4-speed automatic

Dimensions
- Wheelbase: 2,500 mm (98.4 in)
- Length: 3,990 mm (157.1 in) (hatchback); 4,240 mm (166.9 in) (2005–09 sedan); 4,250 mm (167.3 in) (2009–11 sedan)
- Width: 1,695 mm (66.7 in)
- Height: 1,470 mm (57.9 in)
- Curb weight: 1,154–1,266 kg (2,544–2,791 lb)

Kia introduced the second generation (JB) in early 2005 model year in Europe and for model year 2006 in North America, based on a redesigned platform shared with the Hyundai Accent. The engine was upgraded to a 110 hp 1.6-litre DOHC four-cylinder "Alpha II" engine now also shared with the Hyundai Accent. Other changes include a new exterior design, an increase in exterior size and interior volume, increased safety features and fuel economy. The station wagon was dropped with this generation in favor of a new 5-door hatchback.

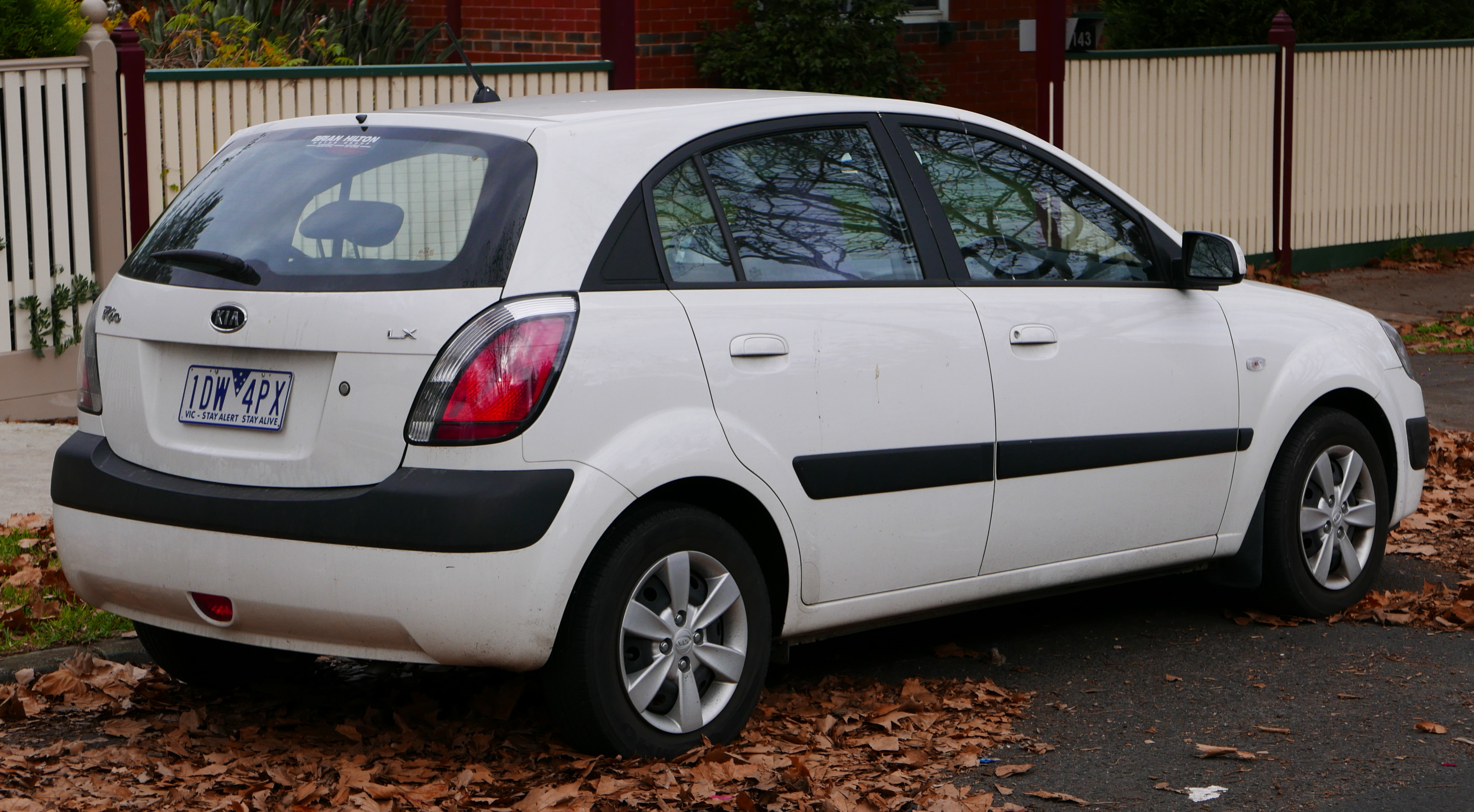
Hatchback (pre-facelift)

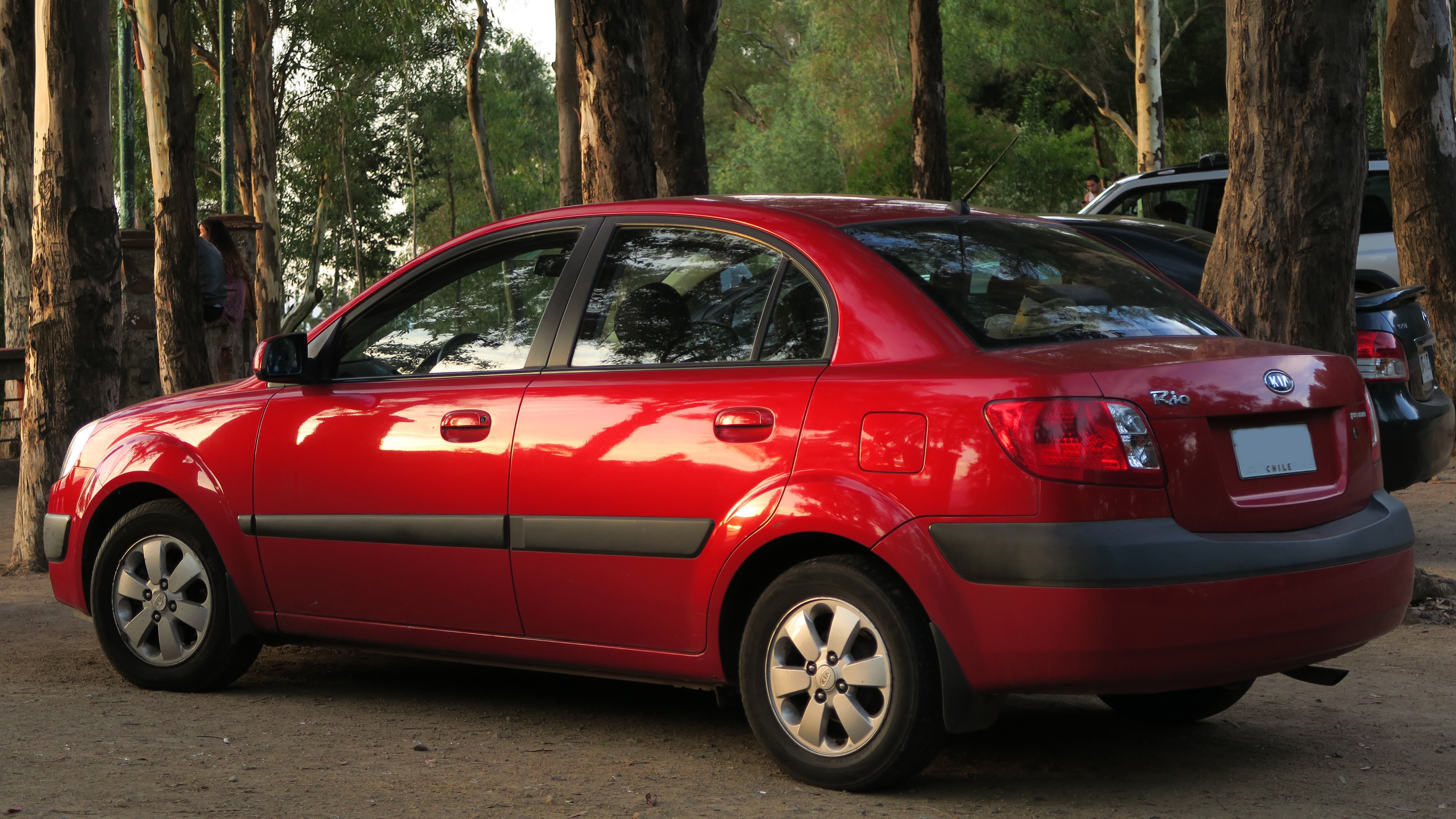
Sedan (pre-facelift)

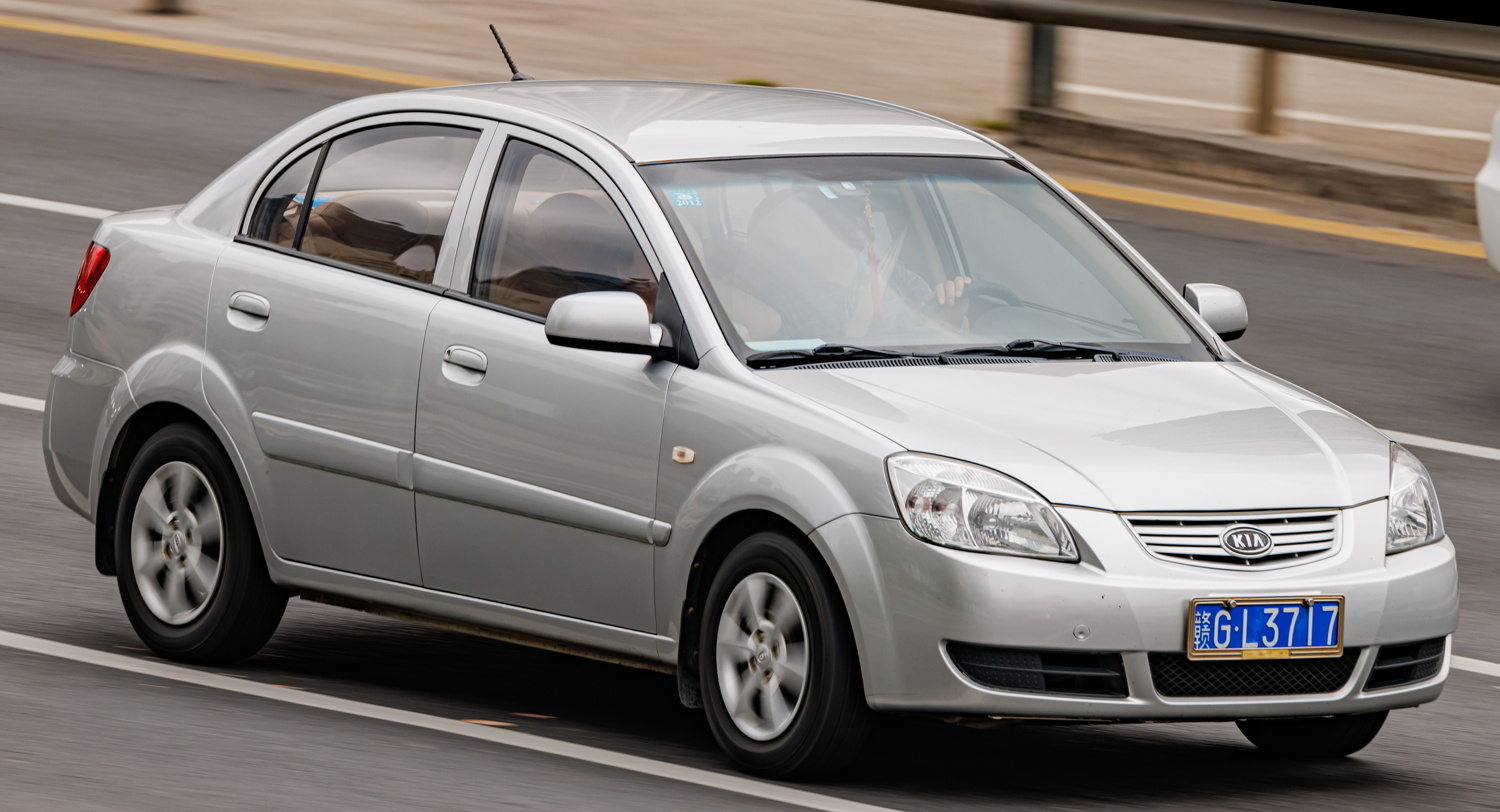
Sedan (China)

Kia offered the 2006 sedan as the Rio and Rio LX, the LX trim included power steering, air conditioning, and CD player. The Rio5 (USA) is offered simply in SX trim level with leather-covered steering wheel. As in the first generation, only the five-door hatchback version was offered in some European markets (including the UK). Three engines are available; a 1.6-litre DOHC engine with 110 hp (82 kW), a lesser 1.4-litre version with 96 hp (72 kW) and a 1.5-litre turbo-diesel engine with 109 hp. However, in the US market only the 1.6-litre gasoline engine is offered, in two body styles: a four-door-sedan and a five-door hatch. The European version's common rail diesel engine produces 110 PS (81 kW).

In 2007, an SX trim level was added to the Rio sedan with the same features supplied with the Rio5 SX.

In 2007, the South Korean government began testing approximately 4,000 pre-production Rio hybrid-electric models, with parent company Hyundai Kia Automotive Group later announcing and subsequently withdrawing anticipated release dates for the hybrid model.

For 2008, Kia offered the LX trim level for the Rio5 (similar to the Rio LX sedan) and a limited production of Rio5 SX Tuner models, featuring Falken FK452 tires, Tanabe strut tower brace and Eibach Federn lowering springs.

For the 2009 model year, all Rio and Rio5 trims received standard Sirius Satellite Radio (complimentary for three months) and radios with USB port & auxiliary jack, the auxiliary jack substituting for a Bluetooth mobile phone connection for devices with an earphone jack. The Kia Rio ranked 5th in the "20 least expensive 2009 vehicles to insure" list by Insure.com. According to research, the Rio is one of the least expensive vehicles to insure.

For the Malaysian market, the second generation Rio was launched on the 7 September 2005 available with only one trim level with only the hatchback body style and powered by a 1.4-litre 16 valve DOHC engine with a 4-speed automatic gearbox and was fully imported from South Korea.

=== Facelift ===
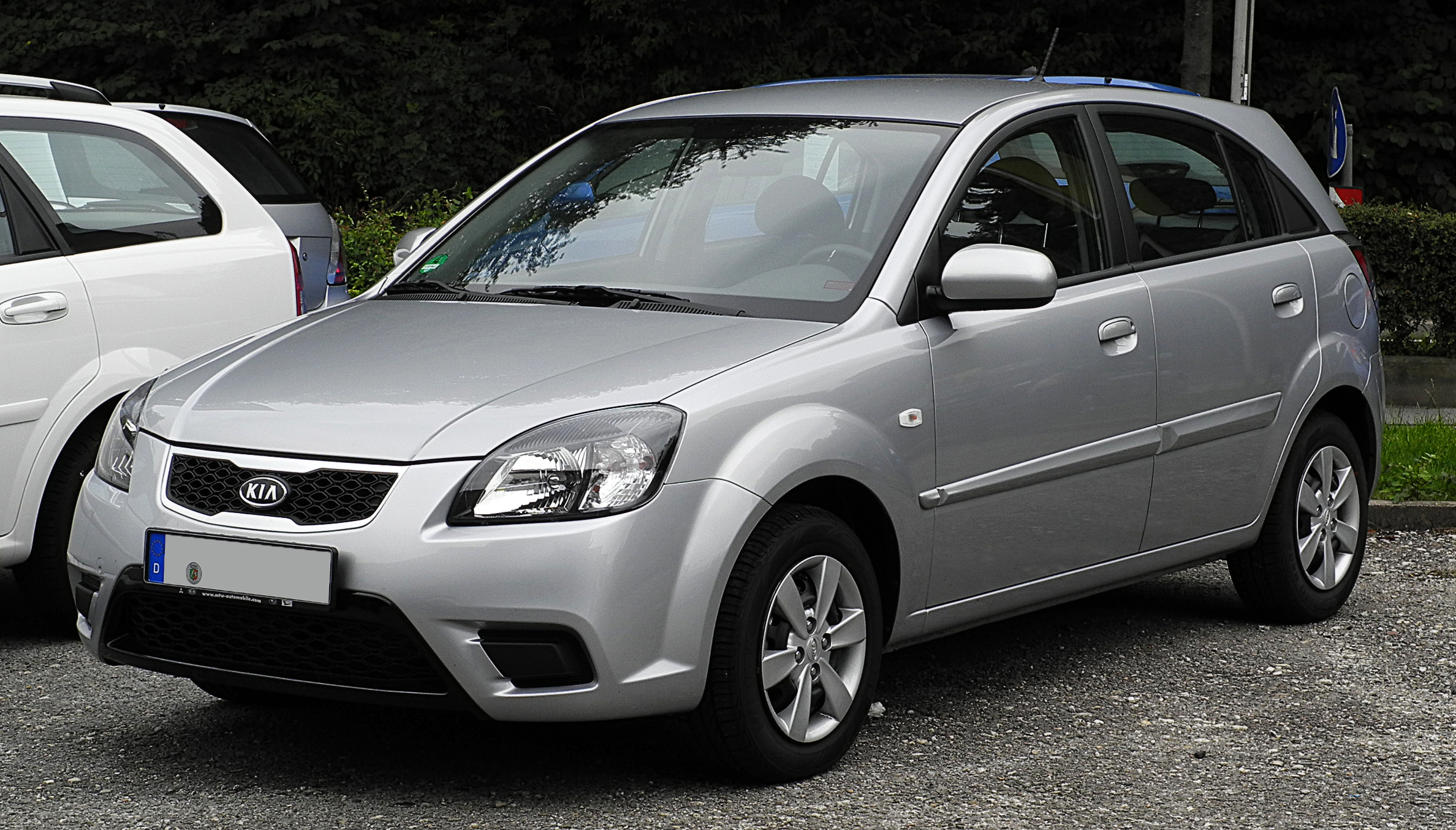

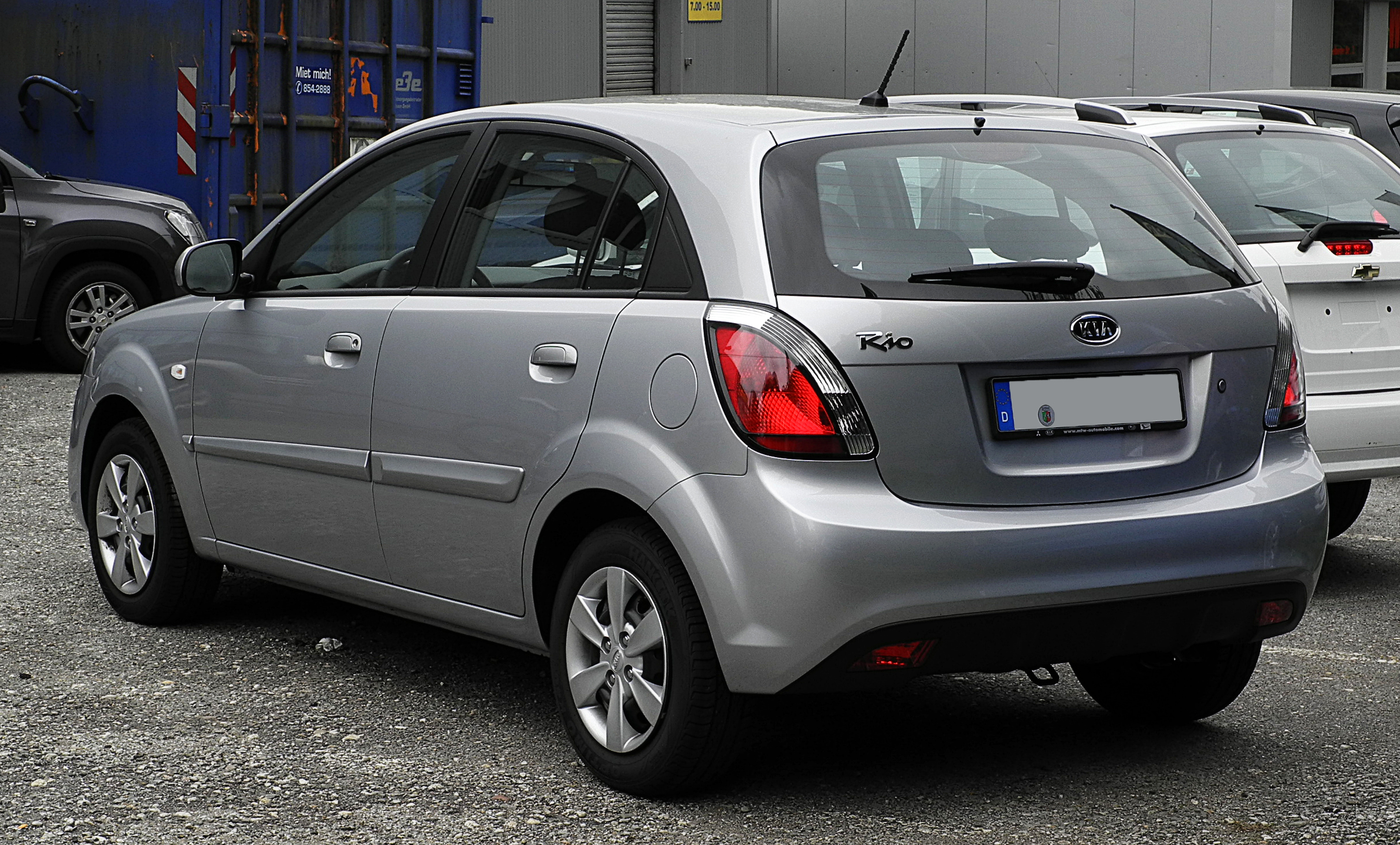
Hatchback (2010 facelift)

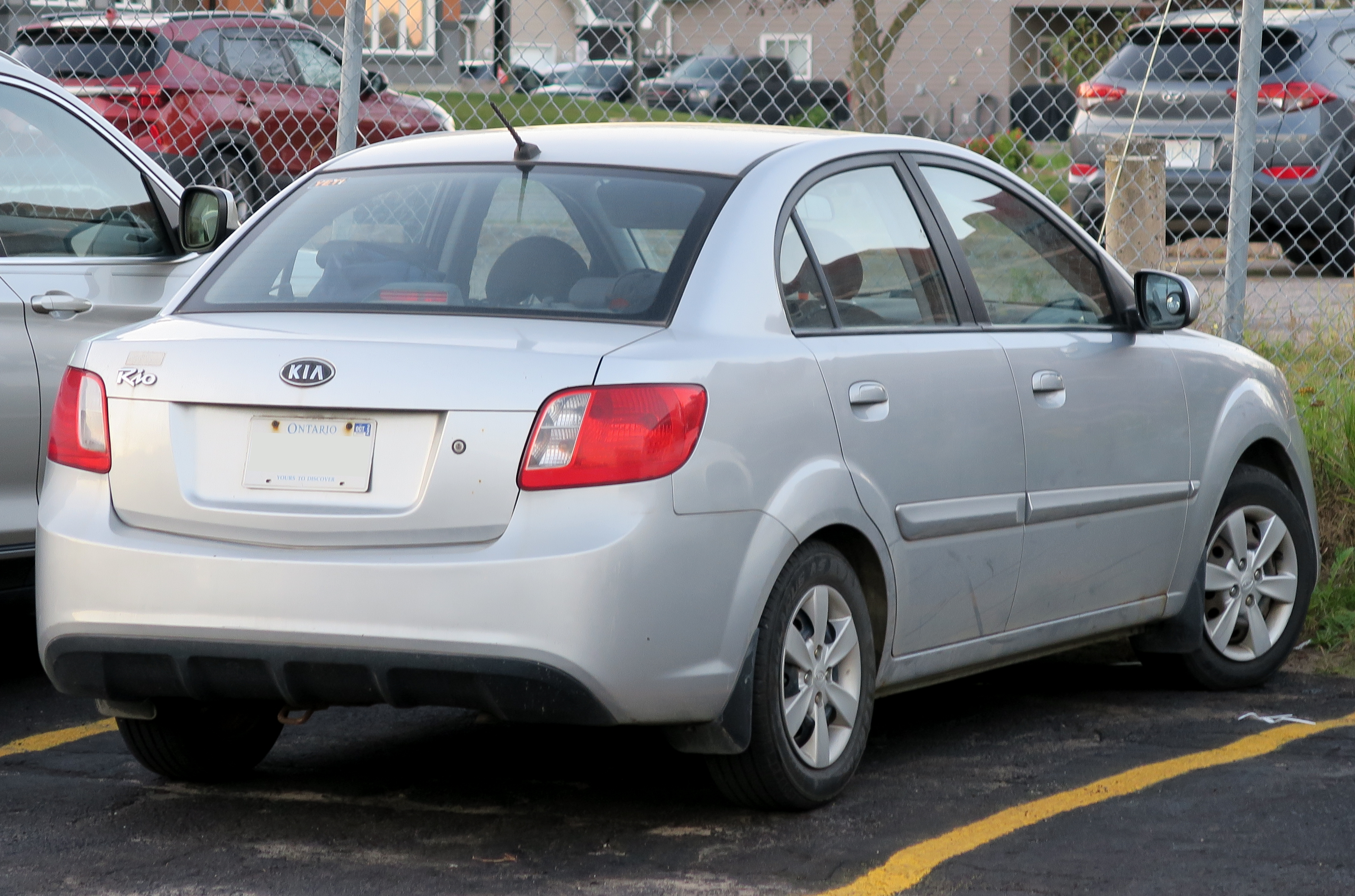
Sedan (2010 facelift)

For the 2010 model year, the models received a facelift in late 2009, adopting Kia's new Tiger nose grille. In addition, the steering wheel receives the same design as the Kia Soul and Kia Forte, featuring optional Bluetooth hands-free phone operation, and the gauges cluster receives a new red backlit design. The headlights were modified slightly, with a darker appearance and parking lights and side-marker lights sharing the turn-signal housing. Side moldings on the car became narrower and body-colored. For the UK version, the Rio looks exactly the same as the US version, except that only the hatchback variant is sold there. It has Kia's new 'Tiger Nose' grille (for the 2010 model) and is powered by a 1.4-litre DOHC four-cylinder 16-valve petrol engine, or a 1.5-liter DOHC four-cylinder 16-valve diesel. They both have a five speed manual gearbox.

This facelifted Kia Rio was never being sold in the markets of Central and Southeastern Europe, apparently due to dismal sales, as well as due to the insufficient production capacities.

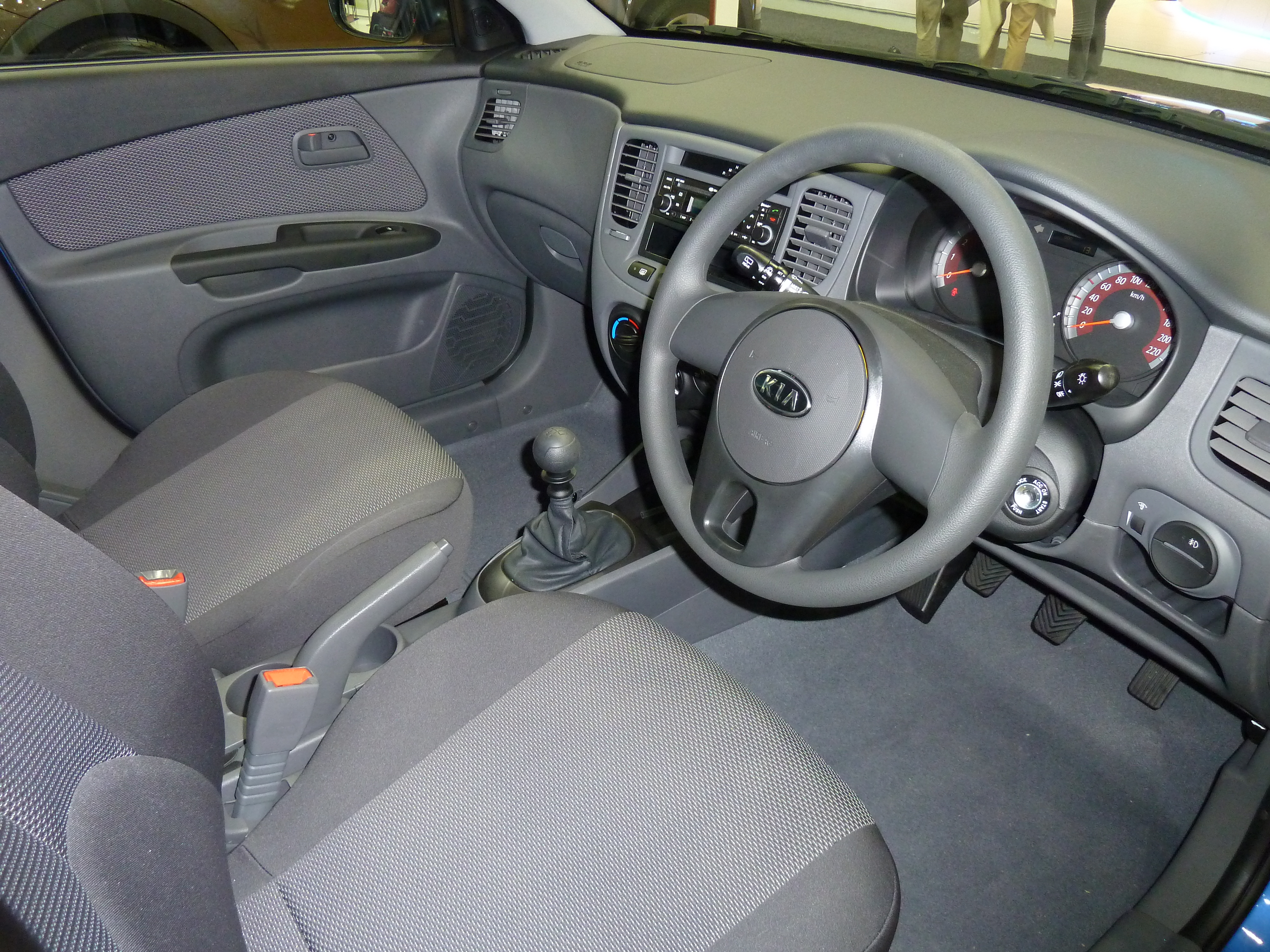
Interior

=== Safety ===
IIHS

The 2006 Rio received Poor to Average ratings from the Insurance Institute for Highway Safety (IIHS).

Test	Rating
Overall:	2/5 stars
Moderate overlap front:	Average
Side:	Poor
Roof strength:	Average
Head restraints & seats:	Poor

Euro NCAP

Euro NCAP test results for a LHD, 5-door hatchback variant on a 2005 registration:

Euro NCAP test results Kia Rio (2005)
Test	Score	Rating
Adult occupant:		4 /5 stars
Child occupant:		3 /5 stars
Pedestrian:		2 /4 stars

ANCAP

ANCAP test results Kia Rio variant(s) as tested (2007)
Test	Score
Overall	3 /5 stars
Frontal offset	11.02/16
Side impact	11.39/16
Pole	Not Assessed
Seat belt reminders	1/3
Whiplash protection	Not Assessed
Pedestrian protection	Marginal
Electronic stability control	Not Available

ANCAP test results Kia Rio variants with 6 airbags (2007)
Test	Score
Overall	4 /5 stars
Frontal offset	11.02/16
Side impact	14.48/16
Pole	2/2
Seat belt reminders	1/3
Whiplash protection	Not Assessed
Pedestrian protection	Marginal
Electronic stability control	Not Available

== Third generation (UB/QB; 2011) ==
Starting from the third generation, the Rio was split into two different models, one being the global model (codename: UB), and the other is a specific model for Russia and China (codename: QB).

=== Global version (UB) ===
Third generation
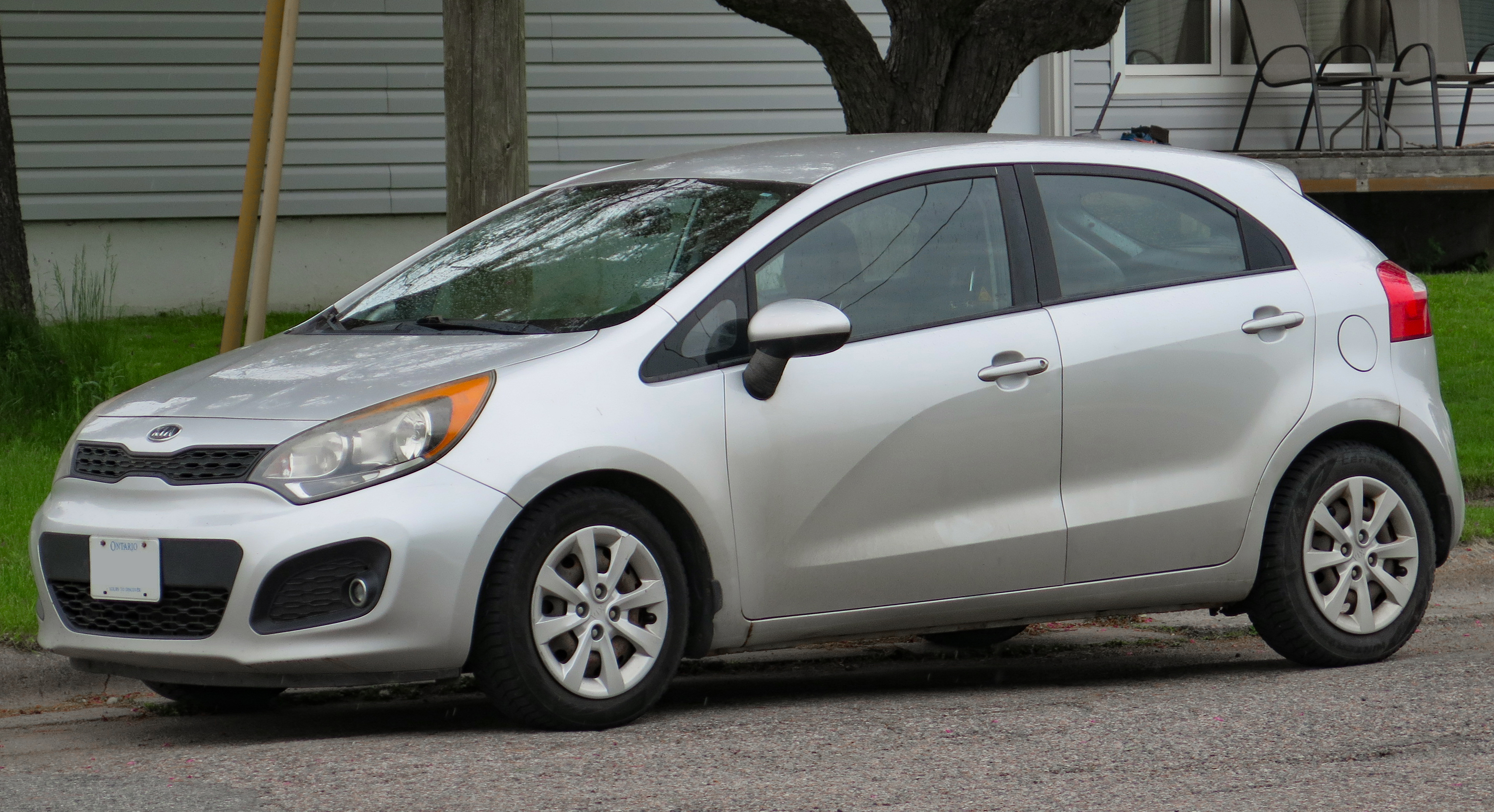
- 5-door hatchback (pre-facelift)

Overview
- Model code: UB
- Also called: Kia Pride
- Production: 2011–2017
- Model years: 2012–2017 (North America)
- Assembly: South Korea: Gwangmyeong (Sohari Plant); Malaysia: Gurun (NAM)
- Designer: Sung Wook Kim; Seung-Hwan Baik (facelift)

Body and chassis
- Body style: 3-door hatchback 5-door hatchback 4-door sedan
- Platform: Hyundai-Kia PB
- Related: Kia Pegas/Soluto; Hyundai Accent (RB); Hyundai Veloster; Hyundai HB20; Hyundai Reina

Powertrain
- Engine: Petrol: 1.25 L Kappa MPi CVVT I4; 1.4 L Gamma MPi CVVT I4; 1.6 L Gamma GDi I4; Diesel: 1.1 L U-Line CRDi I3-T; 1.4 L U-Line CRDi I4-T
- Transmission: 5-speed manual 6-speed M6CF1 manual 4-speed automatic 6-speed A6GF1 automatic

Dimensions
- Wheelbase: 2,570 mm (101.2 in)
- Length: 4,046 mm (159.3 in) (hatchback); 4,366 mm (171.9 in) (sedan)
- Width: 1,720 mm (67.7 in)
- Height: 1,455 mm (57.3 in)
- Curb weight: 1,104–1,341 kg (2,434–2,956 lb)

The global third-generation Rio debuted on March 1, 2011, at the Geneva Motor Show, again based on the Hyundai Accent. It was designed at Kia's design studios in Irvine, California. The vehicle feature sloping shoulder lines and wedge-shaped exteriors, which is inline with other Kia models at the time such as the 2011 Optima and Sportage. The Rio also feature its own interpretation of Kia's signature grille known as the "Tiger Nose", which is slimmed down to connect to the headlamp design. The new design includes a larger air intake. Its extended wheelbase of 2,570 mm (101.2 in) improves passenger and cargo space.

The Rio in Europe also receives a 3-door model. It is mechanically identical to the 5-door, though its longer doors give it a more sporting appearance that appeals to younger audiences. The 3-door is also noticeably cheaper than the 5-door.

In November 2011, the third-generation Rio was awarded Semperit Irish Car of the Year and in December was awarded Australian CarsGuide's 2011 Car of the Year award as well, triumphing over many other vehicles including the likes of the Range Rover Evoque and the recently facelifted Ford Territory.

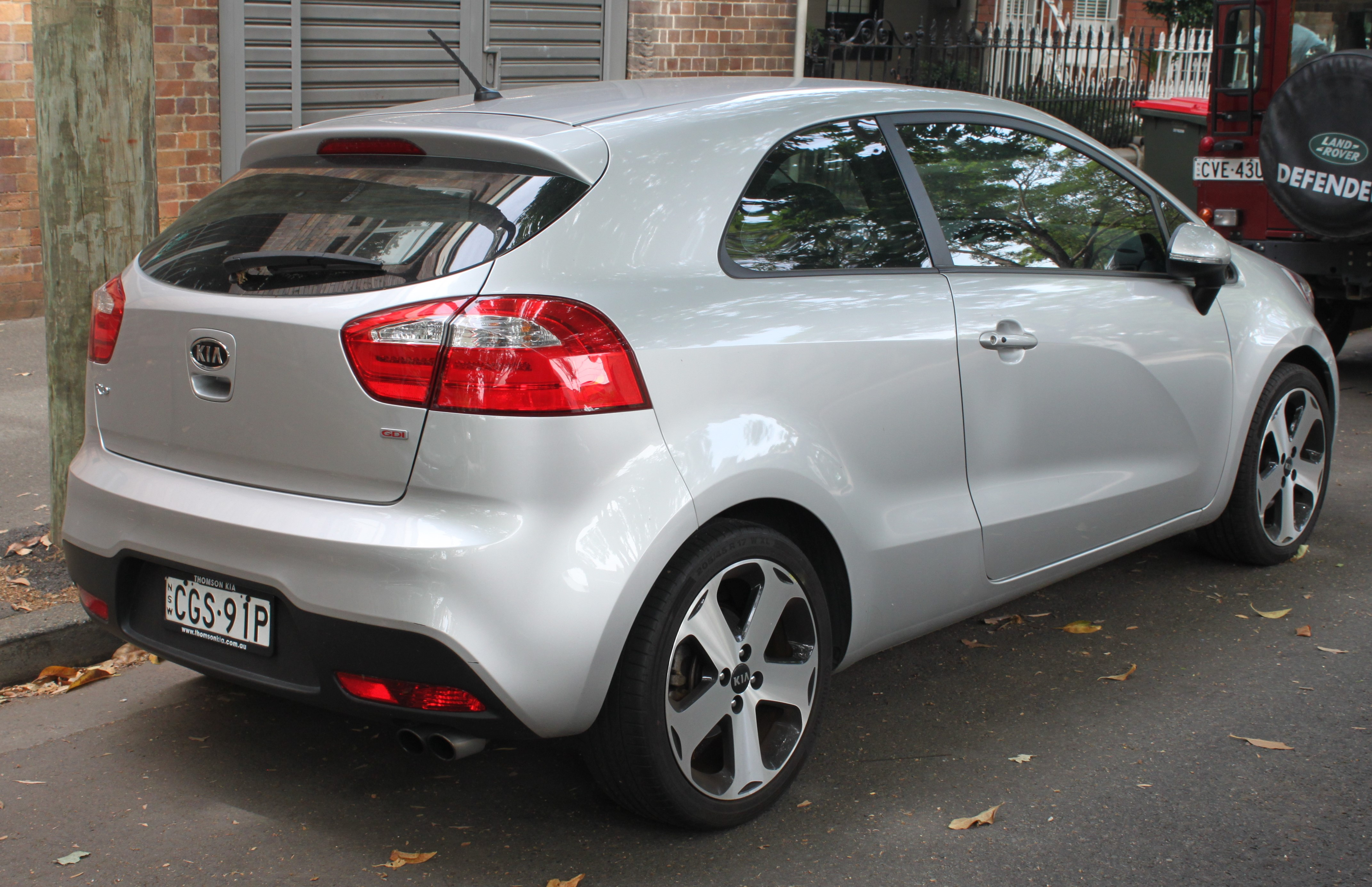
Rear view (3-door hatchback)

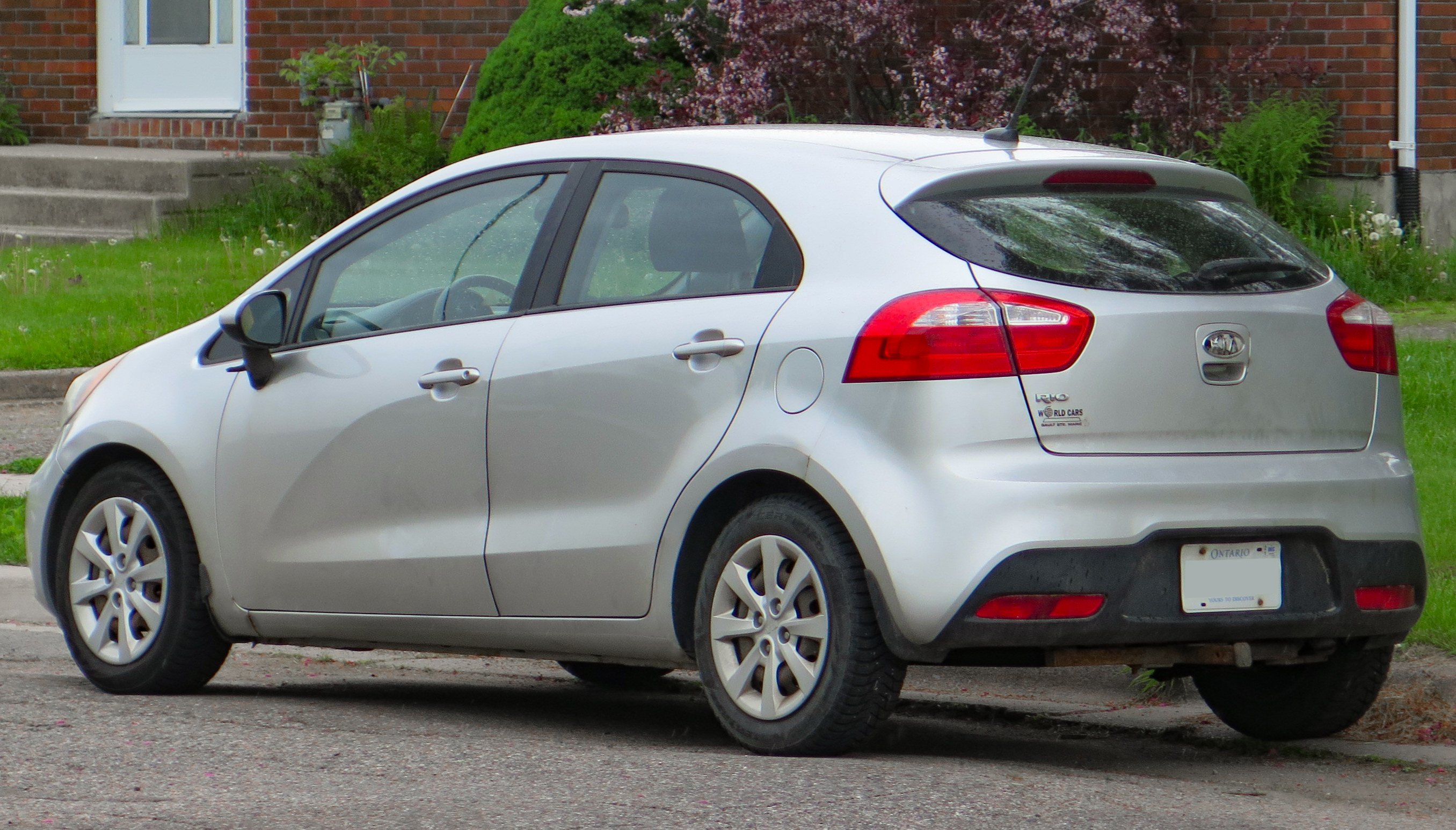
Rear view (5-door hatchback)

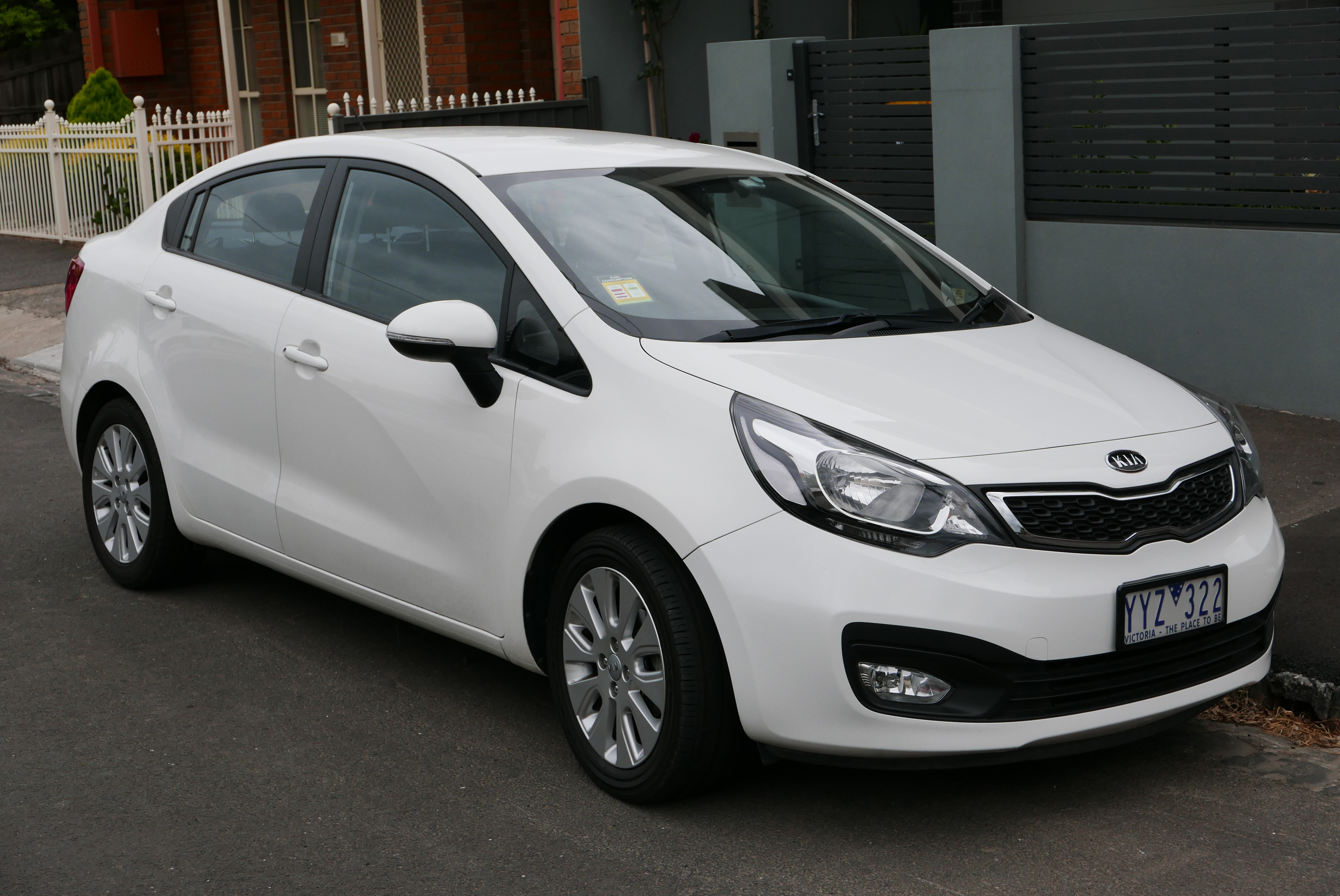
Sedan

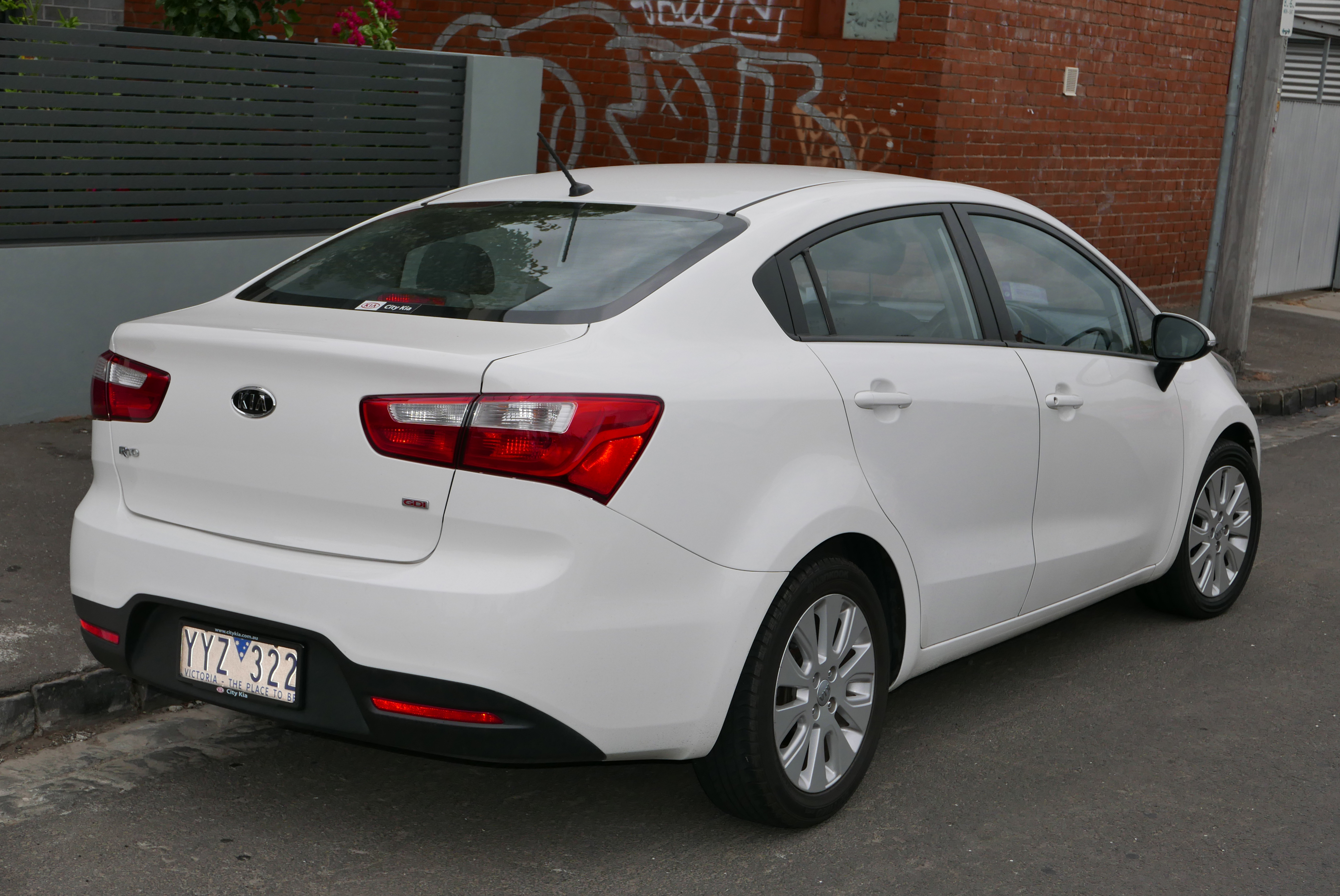
Rear view

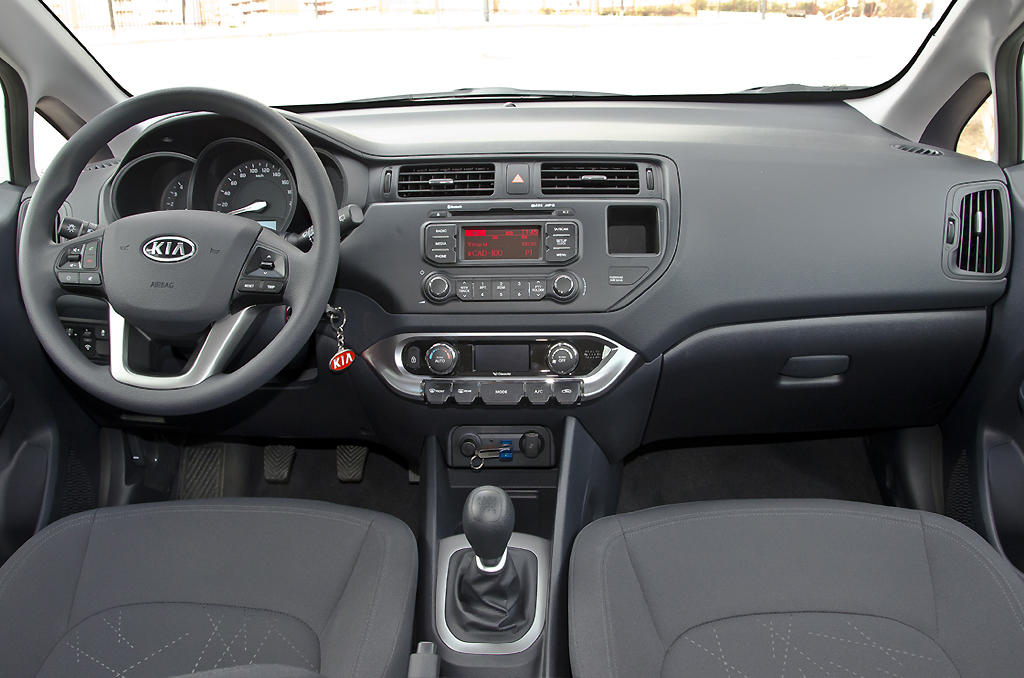
Interior

==== Powertrain ====
The UB Rio featured 1.4-litre or 1.6-litre Hyundai GDI Gamma engines. The European market also received the option of a 1.25-litre petrol engine, as well as a 1.4-litre or 1.1-litre CRDi turbo-diesel engine - the 1.1-litre engine having the lowest CO_{2} emissions and highest MPG of any non-electric or hybrid car currently on sale at time of writing; up to 88 mpg on the EU combined cycle (73 mpg in US gallons) and emitting only 85 grams of CO_{2} per kilometer. This market, however, lacked the 1.6-litre engine, with the 1.4-litre being the most powerful on offer.

Transmission options included a 6-speed manual and 6-speed automatic for the American market, with the European market receiving a 5-speed manual for the 1.25-litre Petrol engine, a 6-speed manual for the 1.4-litre petrol, 1.1-litre and 1.4-litre diesels and a 4-speed automatic for the 1.4-litre petrol "2" spec model in 5-door configuration. Intelligent stop & go was an option on almost all available trim and engine levels.

==== Facelift (2015) ====
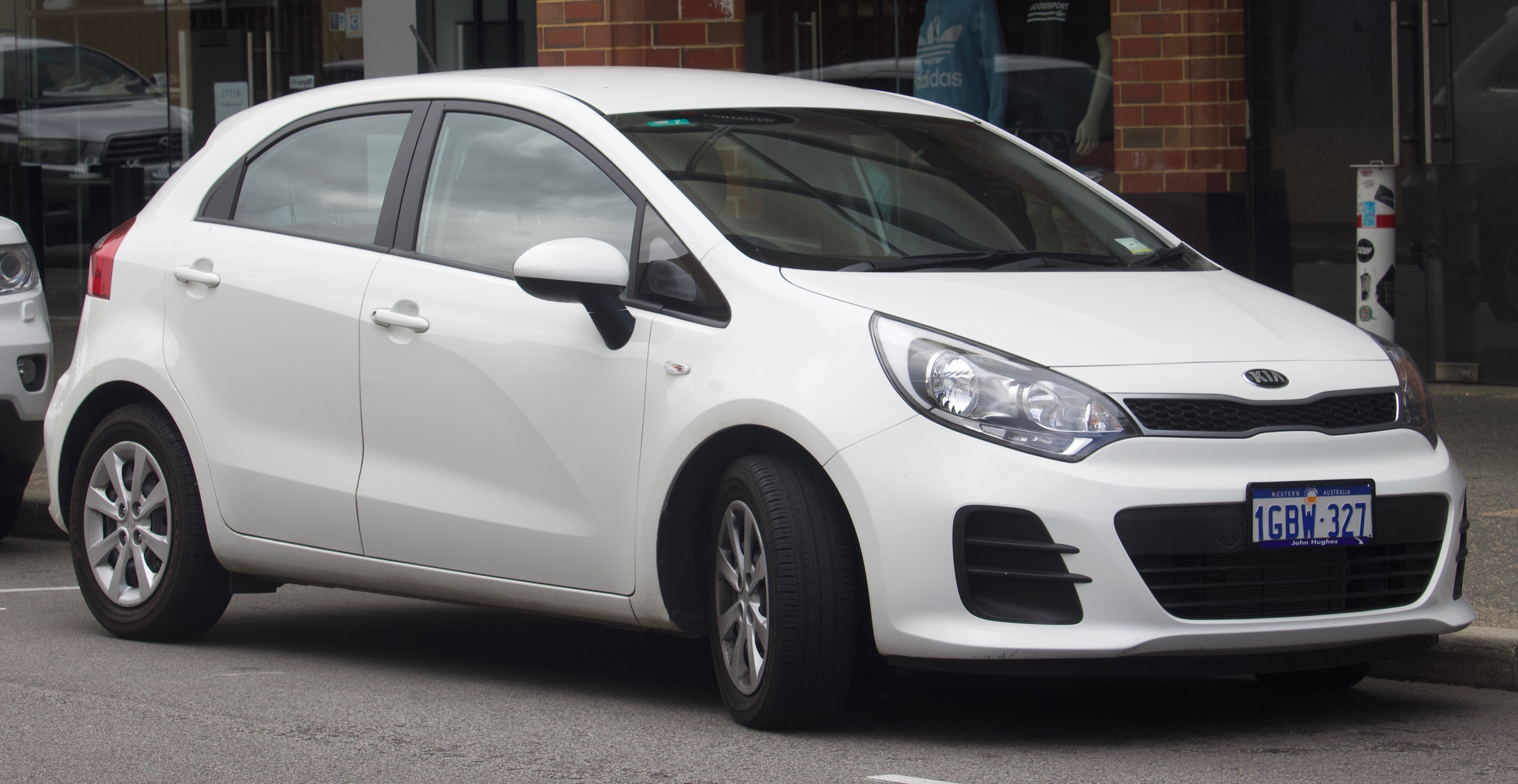
Facelift Kia Rio 5-door hatchback (front)

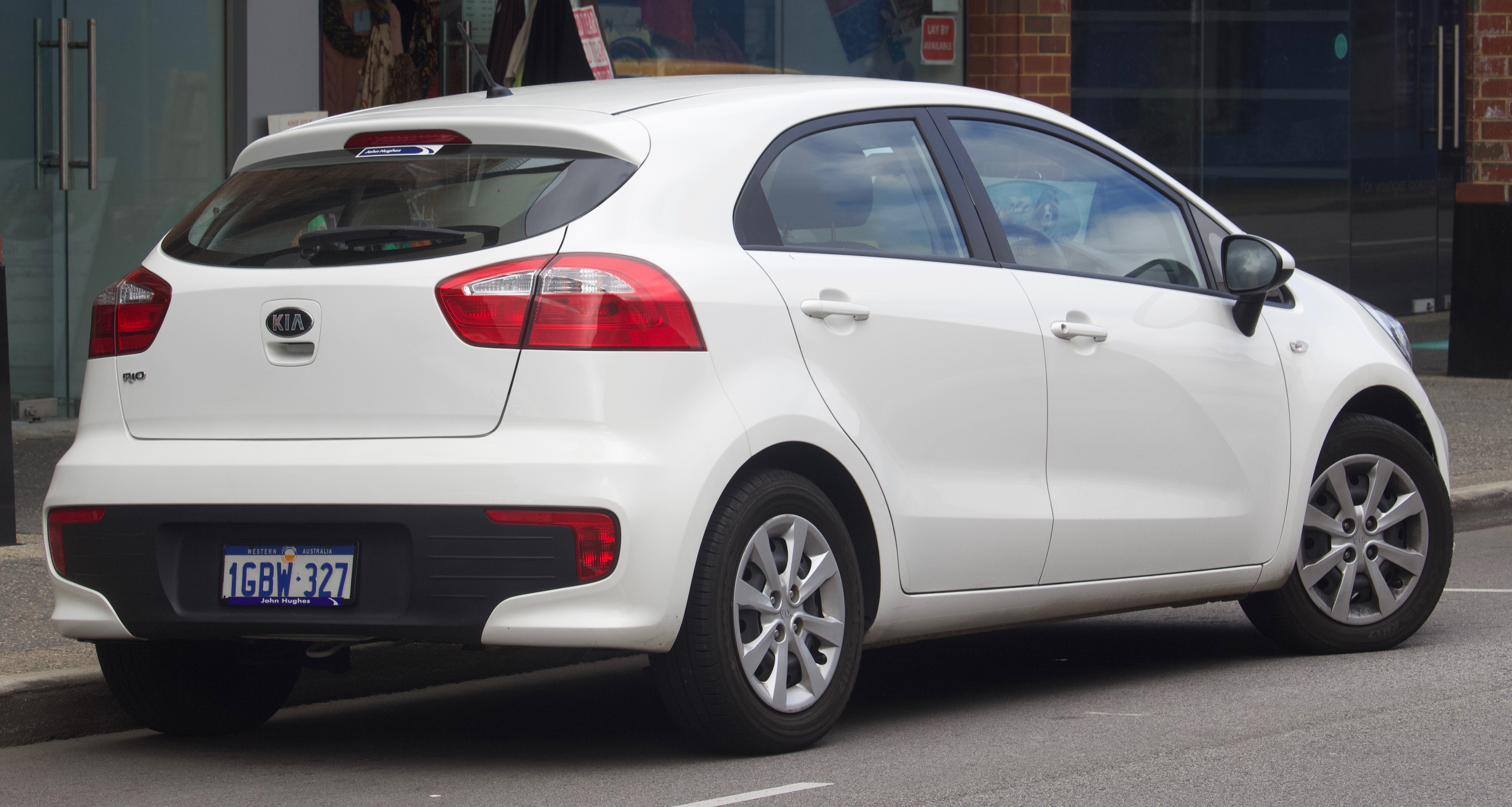
Facelift Kia Rio 5-door hatchback (rear)

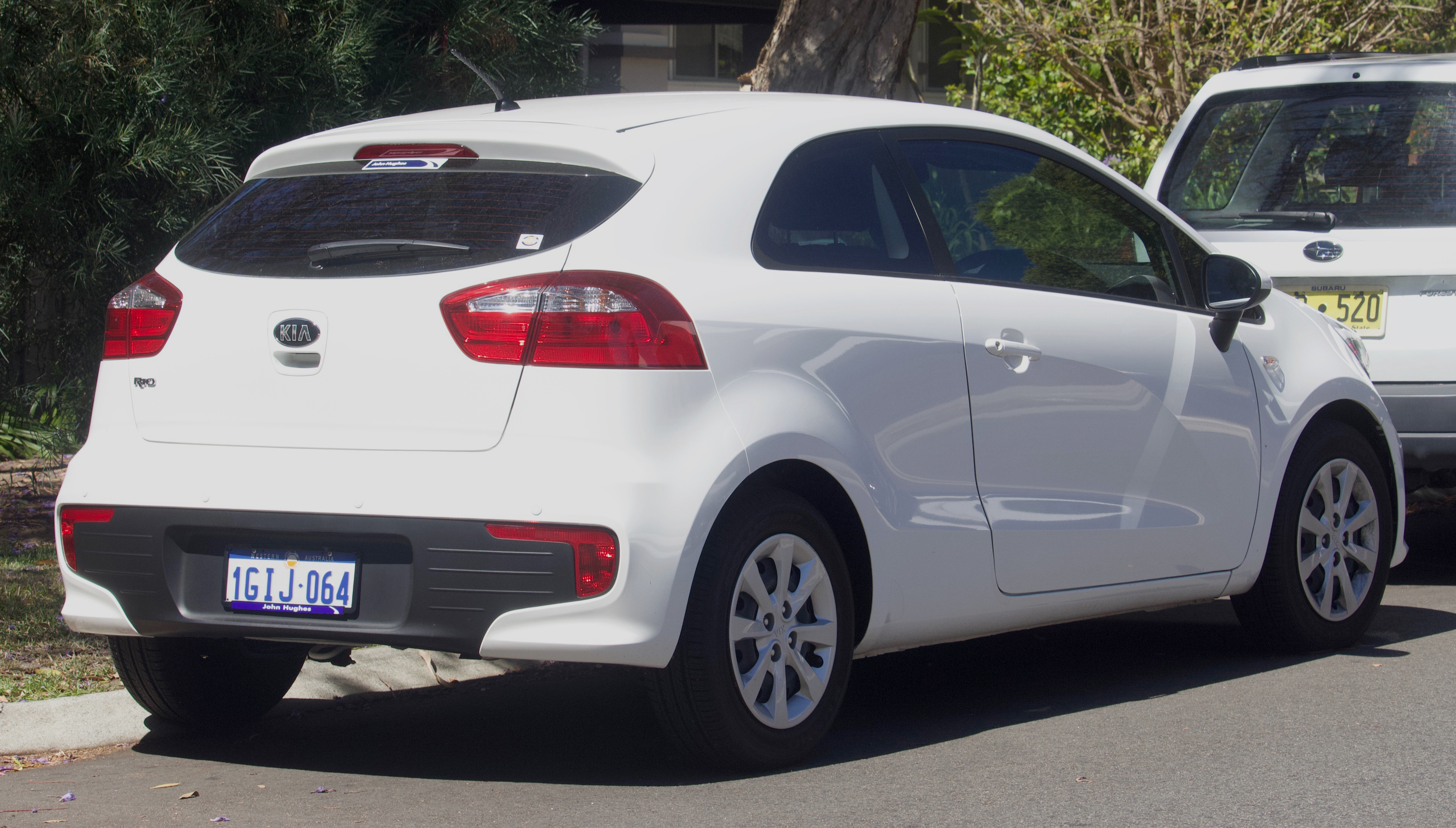
Facelift Kia Rio 3-door hatchback

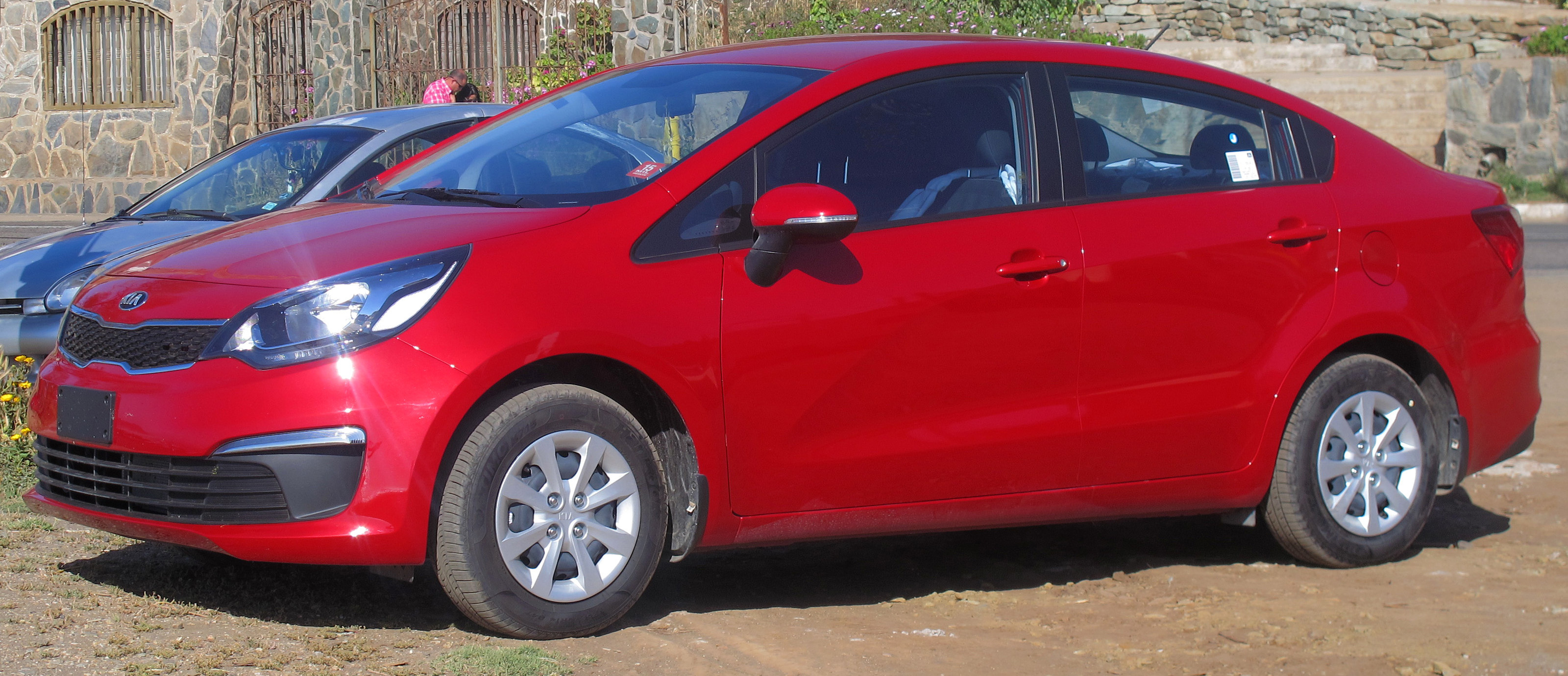
Facelift Kia Rio 4-door sedan

==== UK ====
In the UK the Rio was available in seven different trim levels in total across its lifespan. In price order from lowest to highest, the Rio trim levels are: 1, 1 Air, VR7 / SR7, 2, 3, and 4. From launch in 2011, the trim levels available were 2 and 3, with the more basic 1, starting from £10,695, and 1 Air trims coming one year later in 2012 and the top spec Rio 4 being added to the line up in 2014. The base Rio 1 had the lack of features such as air-conditioning and alloy wheels but all Rio models were equipped with Bluetooth from factory. The Rio VR7 was a special edition model that entered the range in 2014 which was based on a 1 Air model but came with upgraded features such as 15" alloy wheels, rear parking sensors, and a leather steering wheel. This became the Rio SR7 after the facelift in 2015. The Rio 2 gained 16" alloy wheels, front fog lights, and heated power-folding door mirrors over the VR7 / SR7 but had a lack of parking sensors amongst the standard equipment. The Rio 3 and 4 were the higher trim levels within the range, with the Rio 3 receiving features such as 17" diamond-cut alloy wheels, heated front seats, LED daytime running lights & rear lights, automatic & cornering headlights, automatic climate control, and a 'Premium Supervision cluster', a larger information display within the driver gauges. Finally, the top spec Rio 4 gained features such as a sunroof, black leather upholstery, a heated steering wheel, and keyless entry & start over the 3 model.

After the facelift in 2015, the Rio 3 and 4 gained a multi-function touchscreen with satellite navigation and a reversing camera, exclusive to these higher models. There were four engines available in the Rio. These are all from Kia's ECOdynamics engine range, consisting of a 1.2 litre and 1.4 litre four-cylinder petrol, a 1.1 litre three-cylinder diesel, and a 1.4 litre four-cylinder diesel. Rio 1, 1 Air and VR7/SR7 were only available with the 1.2 petrol and 1.1 diesel, and the Rio 2 was available with all four engine options. The 3 and 4 trim levels were only available with the 1.4 petrol and 1.4 diesel, both standard with a 6-speed manual, with an option of a 4-speed automatic on the 1.4 petrol, which was also available in the Rio 2.

The colours available on the pre-facelift Rio are Clear White (standard colour), Bright Silver, Midnight Black, Blaze Red, Electric Blue (2, 3 & 4), and Graphite Metallic, the latter only being available on 3 and 4 models. The facelift brought two new colours to the Rio; Urban Blue, replacing Electric Blue and is only available on Rio 2 and 3, and Yellow Zest, a colour exclusive to the SR7 trim. Graphite Metallic still remains available on the facelift Rio but only on the Rio 4.

==== Safety ====
===== Latin NCAP =====
The Korean-made Rio Sedan in its most basic Latin American market configuration with no airbags, no ABS and no ESC received 0 stars for adult occupants and 1 star for toddlers from Latin NCAP 2.0 in May 2017.

Latin NCAP 2.0 test results Kia Rio Sedan - NO Airbags (2017, based on Euro NCAP 2008)
Test	Points	Stars
Adult occupant:	0/34.0	0 /5 stars
Child occupant:	16.15/49.00	1 /5 stars

===== IIHS =====
The 2012 Rio received Marginal to Good ratings from the Insurance Institute for Highway Safety (IIHS).

Test	Rating
Overall:	4/5 stars
Small overlap front:	Marginal
Moderate overlap front:	Good
Side:	Average
Roof strength:	Good
Head restraints & seats:	Good

===== Euro NCAP =====
Euro NCAP test results for a LHD, 5-door hatchback standard European market variant on a 2011 registration:

Euro NCAP test results Kia Rio (2011)
Test	Points	%
Overall:	5 /5 stars	
Adult occupant:	33	92%
Child occupant:	41.1	84%
Pedestrian:	16.7	46%
Safety assist:	6	86%

===== ANCAP =====
ANCAP test results Kia Rio all variants (2011)
Test	Score
Overall	5 /5 stars
Frontal offset	14.99/16
Side impact	15/16
Pole	2/2
Seat belt reminders	3/3
Whiplash protection	Not Assessed
Pedestrian protection	Marginal
Electronic stability control	Standard

=== Russian/Chinese version (QB) ===
Third generation
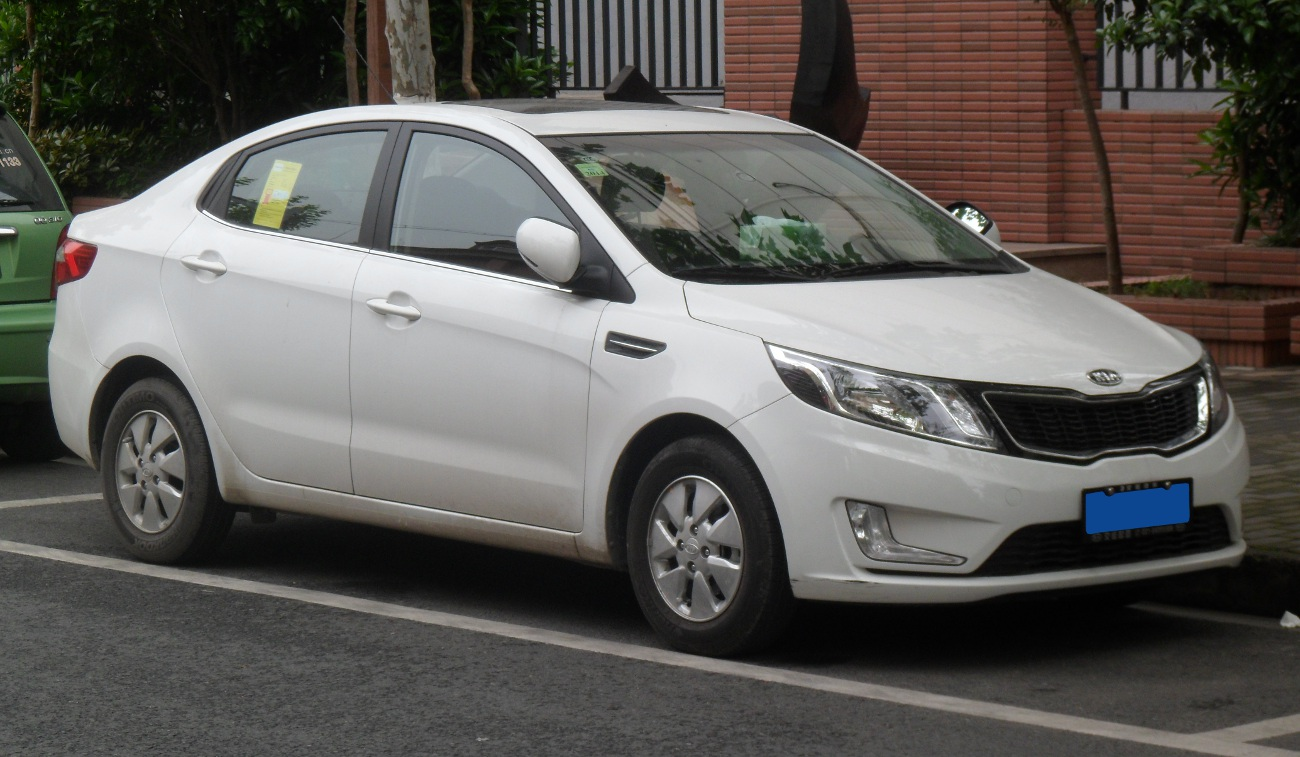
- Kia K2 sedan (China; pre-facelift)

Overview
- Model code: QB
- Also called: Kia K2 (China)
- Production: 2011–2017
- Assembly: China: Yancheng (DYK); Russia: St. Petersburg (HMMR)

Body and chassis
- Body style: 5-door hatchback 4-door sedan
- Platform: Hyundai-Kia PB
- Related: Hyundai Accent/Solaris (RB); Hyundai Reina

Powertrain
- Engine: Petrol: 1.4 L Gamma MPi I4; 1.6 L Gamma MPi I4
- Transmission: 5/6-speed manual 4/6-speed automatic

Dimensions
- Wheelbase: 2,570 mm (101.2 in)
- Length: 4,120–4,125 mm (162.2–162.4 in) (hatchback); 4,370–4,377 mm (172.0–172.3 in) (sedan)
- Width: 1,700 mm (66.9 in)
- Height: 1,470 mm (57.9 in)
- Curb weight: 1,115–1,151 kg (2,458–2,538 lb)

Kia developed a separate Rio model for the Russian market. Production began on 15 August 2011 at the Hyundai plant in Saint Petersburg, and the QB Kia Rio was officially released in Russia on 17 August 2011. Hatchback production in Russia started in January 2012. The QB Rio features a more conservative design than the UB Rio. This version was also released to Chinese market, badged as the Kia K2.

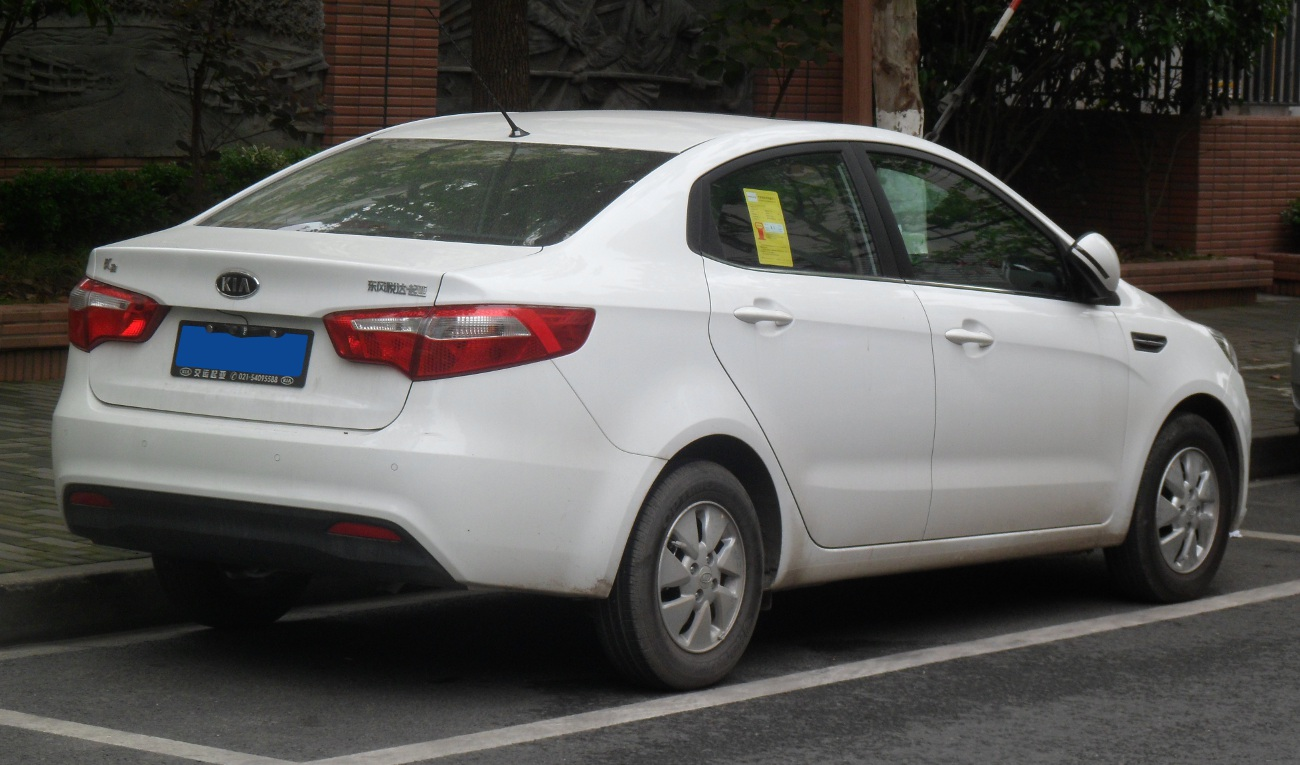
Kia K2 sedan (China; pre-facelift)

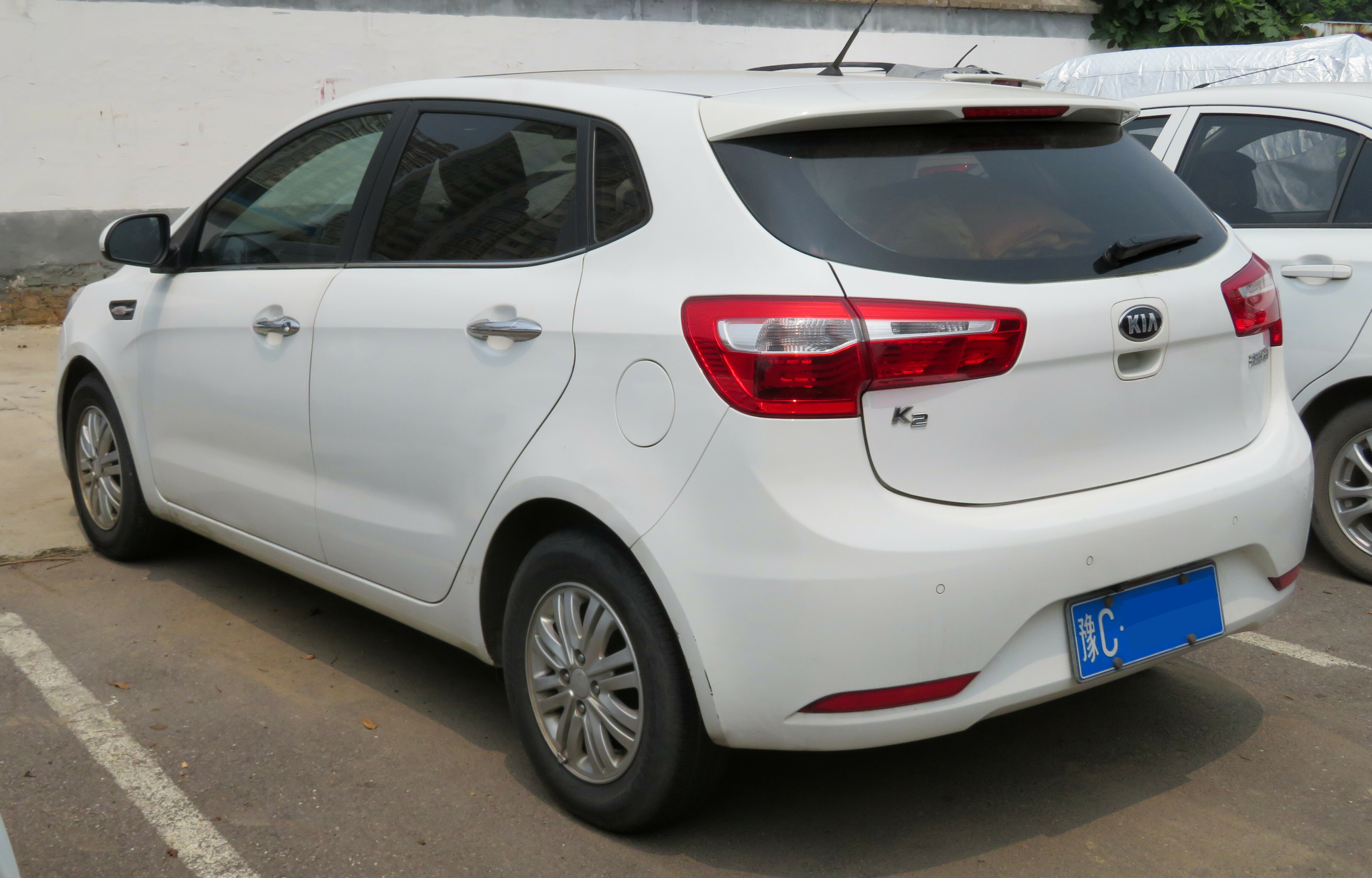
Kia K2 hatchback (China; pre-facelift)

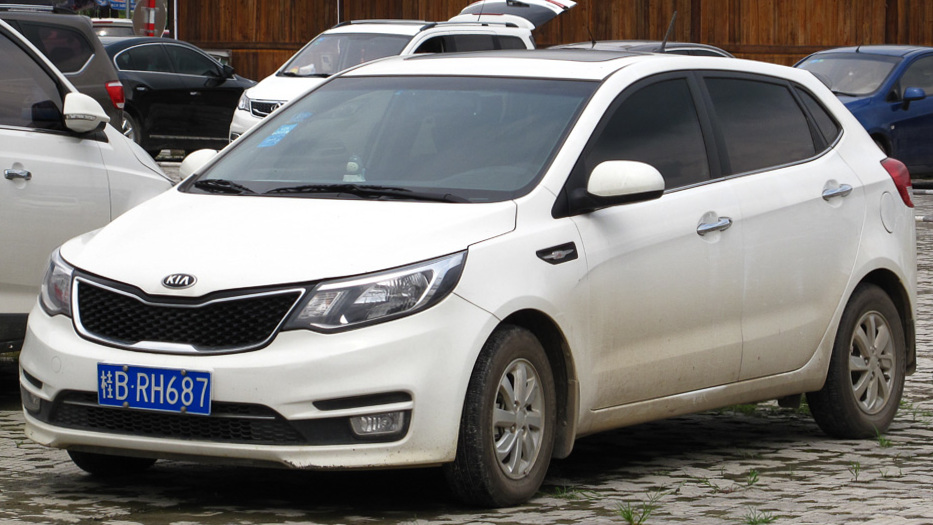
Kia K2 hatchback (China; facelift)

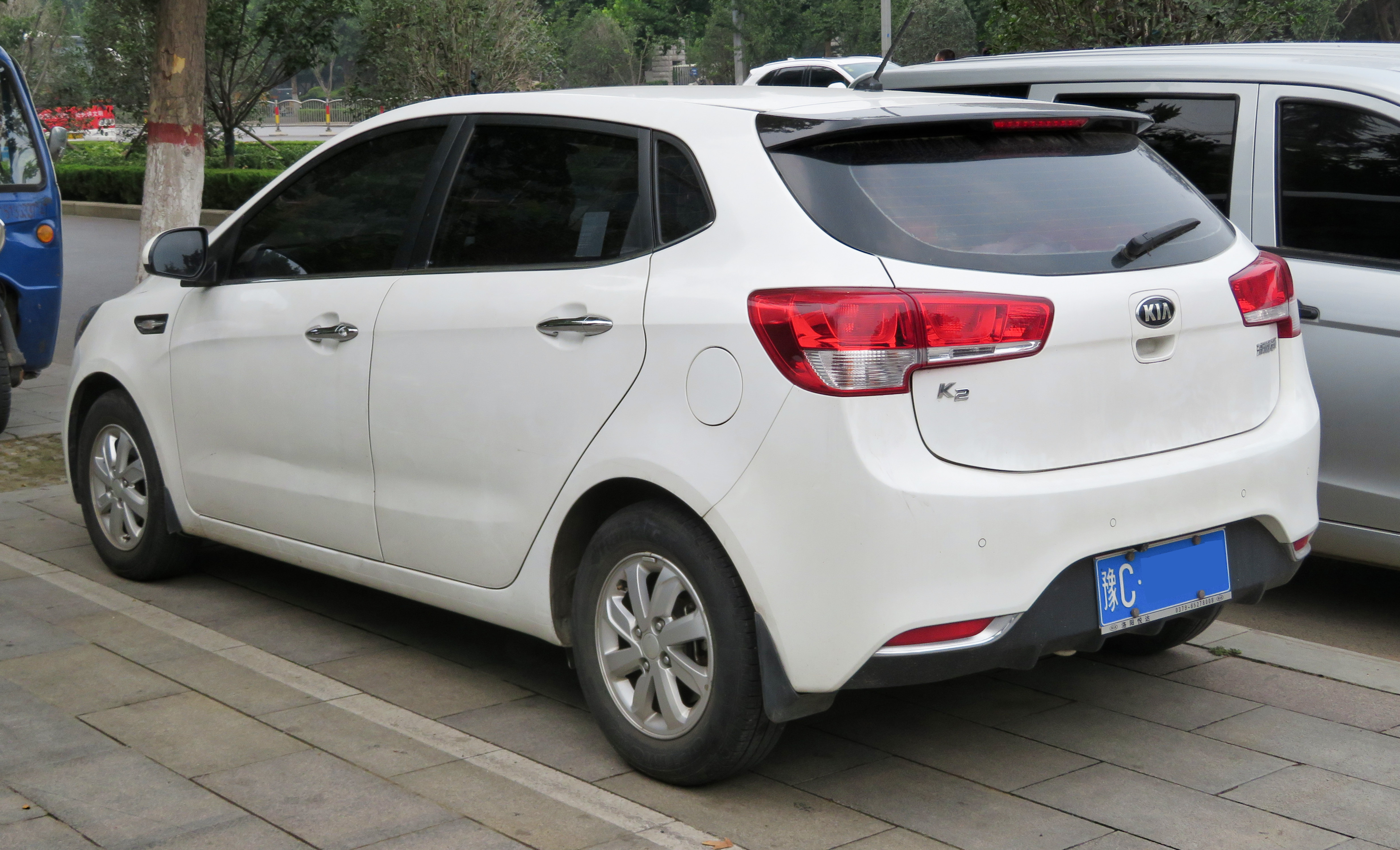
Kia K2 hatchback (China; facelift)

== Fourth generation (YB/SC/FB/UC; 2016) ==
The fourth-generation Rio also consists of two different models, one being the global model produced in South Korea, Mexico and Algeria known with the model code YB or SC, and the other is a specific model for Russia and China known with the model code FB or UC and produced in the aforementioned countries and in Ukraine.

=== Global version (YB/SC) ===
Fourth generation
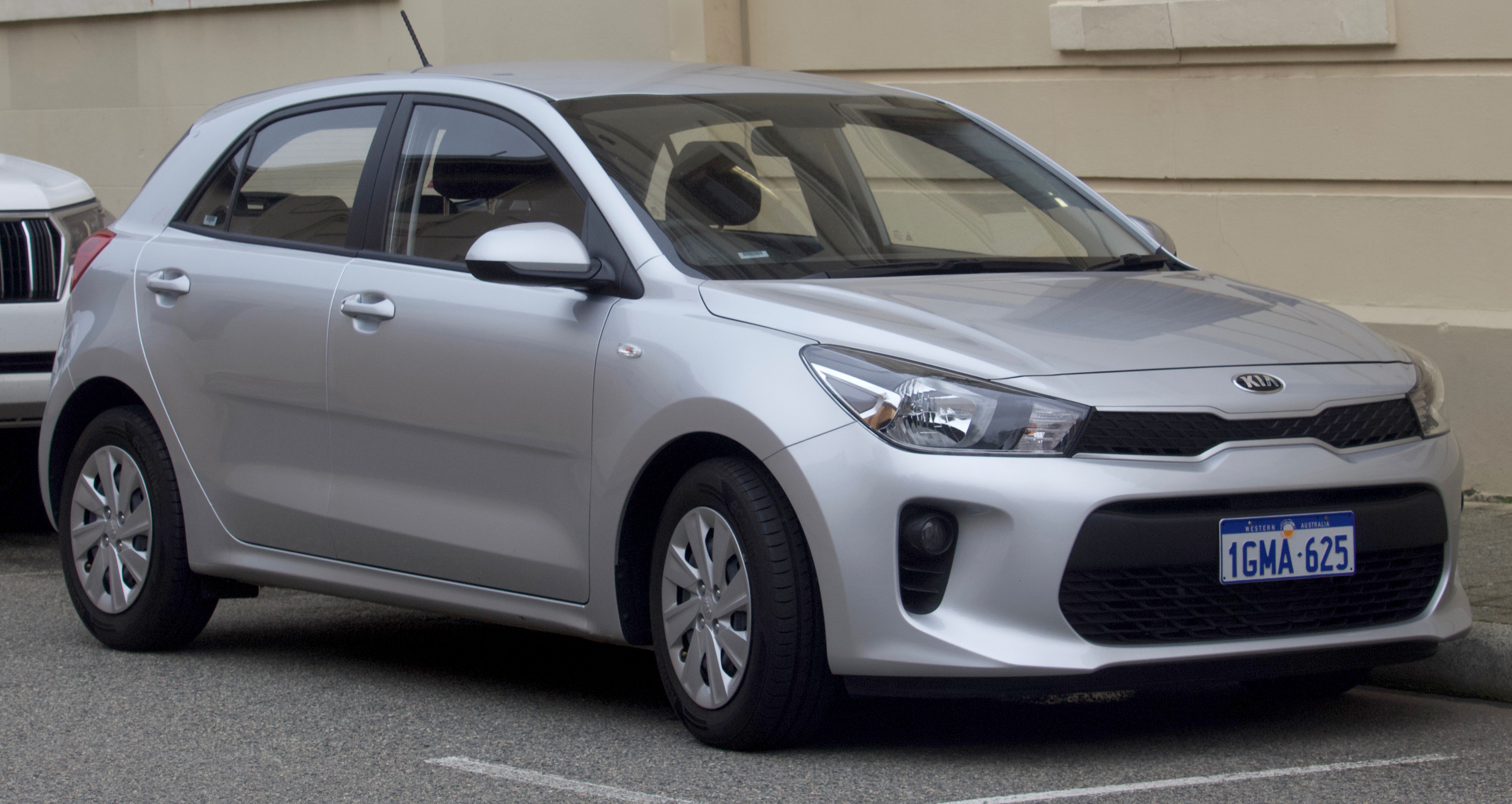
- Hatchback (pre-facelift)

Overview
- Model code: YB/SC
- Also called: Kia Tonic (crossover version, Colombia)
- Production: 2016 – December 2023
- Model years: 2018–2023 (North America)
- Assembly: South Korea: Gwangmyeong (Sohari Plant); Mexico: Pesquería (KMMX); Algeria: Batna (GLOVIZ)
- Designer: Peter Schreyer

Body and chassis
- Body style: 5-door hatchback 4-door sedan
- Platform: Hyundai-Kia GB
- Related: Kia Stonic; Hyundai Accent (HC); Hyundai i20 (GB)

Powertrain
- Engine: Petrol: 1.0 L Kappa T-GDi I3; 1.2 L Kappa I4; 1.4 L Kappa I4; 1.6 L Gamma GDi I4; 1.6 L Gamma MPi I4 Diesel: 1.4 L U-Line TCi I4
- Transmission: 5/6-speed manual 4/6-speed automatic 7-speed DCT; CVT
- Hybrid drivetrain: Mild Hybrid

Dimensions
- Wheelbase: 2,580 mm (101.6 in)
- Length: Hatchback: 4,065 mm (160.0 in); Sedan: 4,420 mm (174.0 in)
- Width: 1,725–1,740 mm (67.9–68.5 in)
- Height: 1,450–1,470 mm (57.1–57.9 in)
- Curb weight: 1,110–1,303 kg (2,447–2,873 lb)

Kia presented the global fourth-generation Rio at the 2016 Paris Motor Show. The new car was designed in Kia's California and Germany design centers and features longer front overhangs, larger hood and a more upright C-pillars for the hatchback model. The hatchback model is 15 mm longer, 5 mm wider and 5 mm shorter in height than its predecessor.

Unlike the previous generations, the fourth-generation Rio is an export-only model since it is not offered in the South Korean domestic market due to decreasing sales of its predecessor. In the country, the Rio-based Stonic crossover was offered instead.

In European markets, the car is only offered in a 5-door hatchback form, while the 3-door hatchback option was discontinued. In other markets such as the Americas, both the 5-door hatchback and sedan body styles are offered. For the North American market, the Rio is manufactured alongside the Forte at the newly built Pesquería plant in Mexico.

For the North American market, the 1.6-liter Gamma GDi engine was replaced starting from the 2020 model year. Officially marketed by Kia in press materials as a "Gamma II MPi", the updated engine features a displacement of 1,598 cc, a 75.6 x 89.0 mm bore/stroke, and an 11.2:1 compression ratio, meaning it is mechanically identical to the Hyundai Smartstream G4FM. The EPA fuel economy rating was significantly improved as a result of the dual-port injection system, while rated maximum horsepower dropped from 130 hp (132 PS; 97 kW) to a peak 120 hp (122 PS; 89 kW).

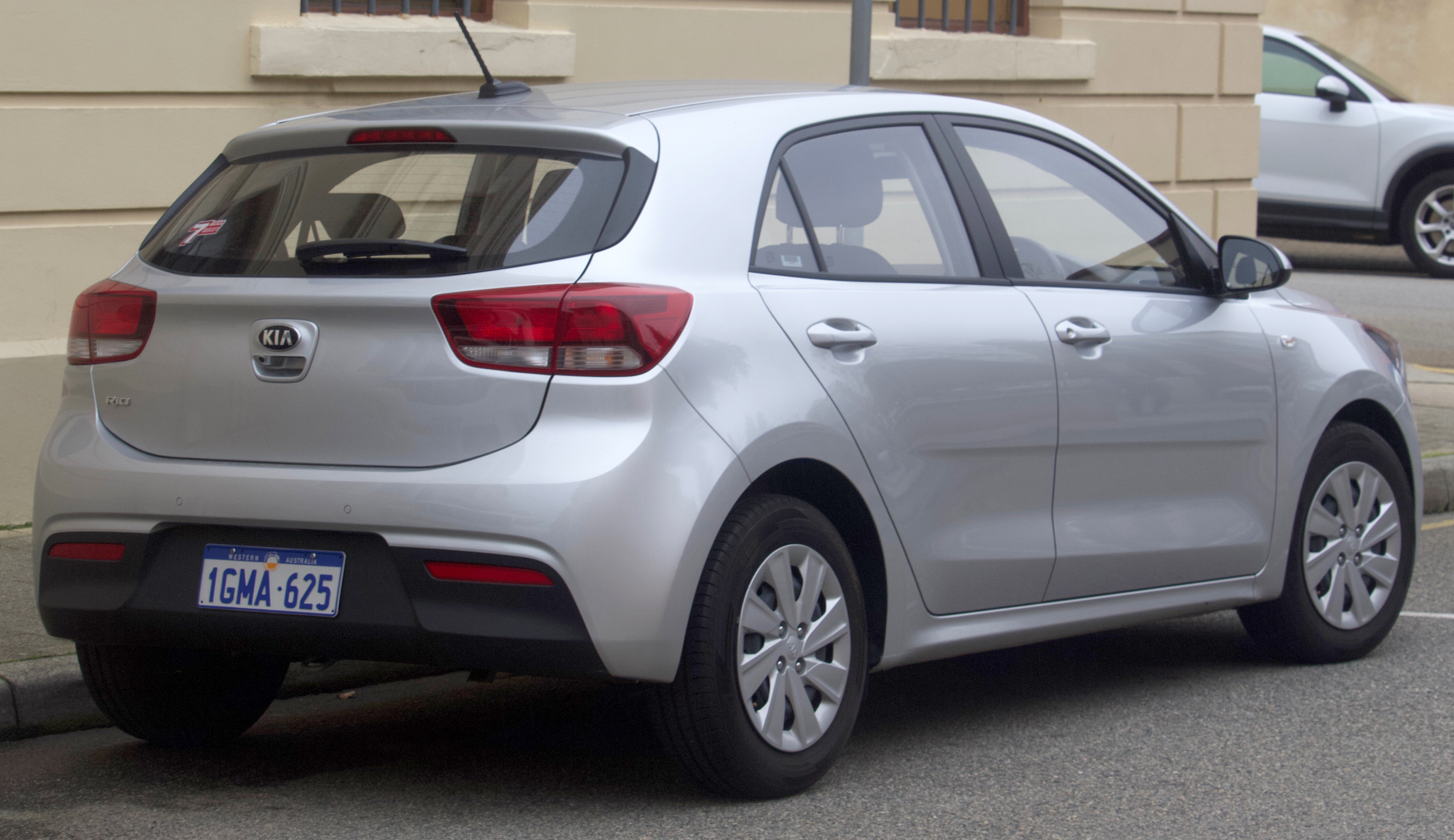
Rear view (hatchback)

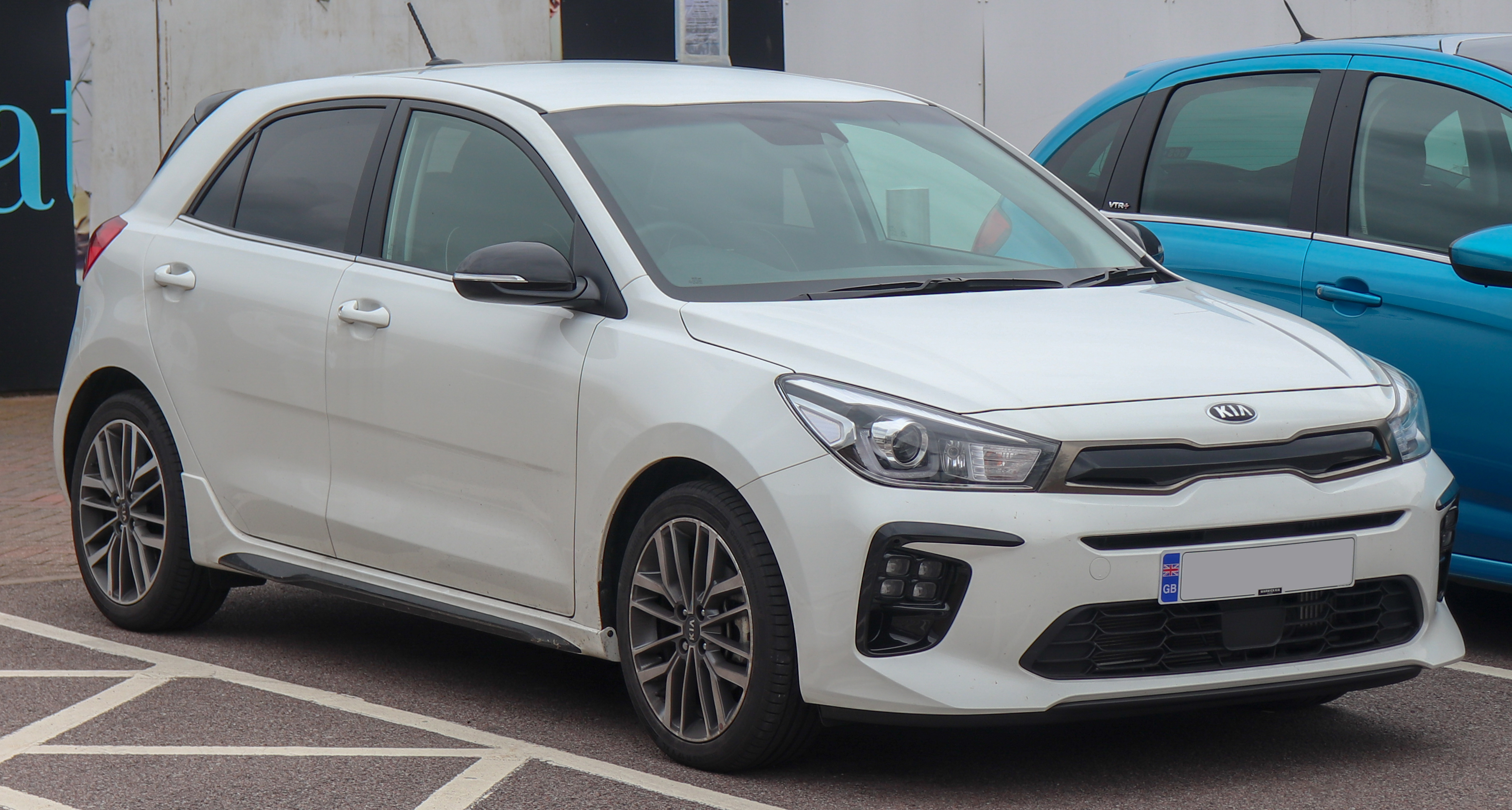
Rio GT-Line

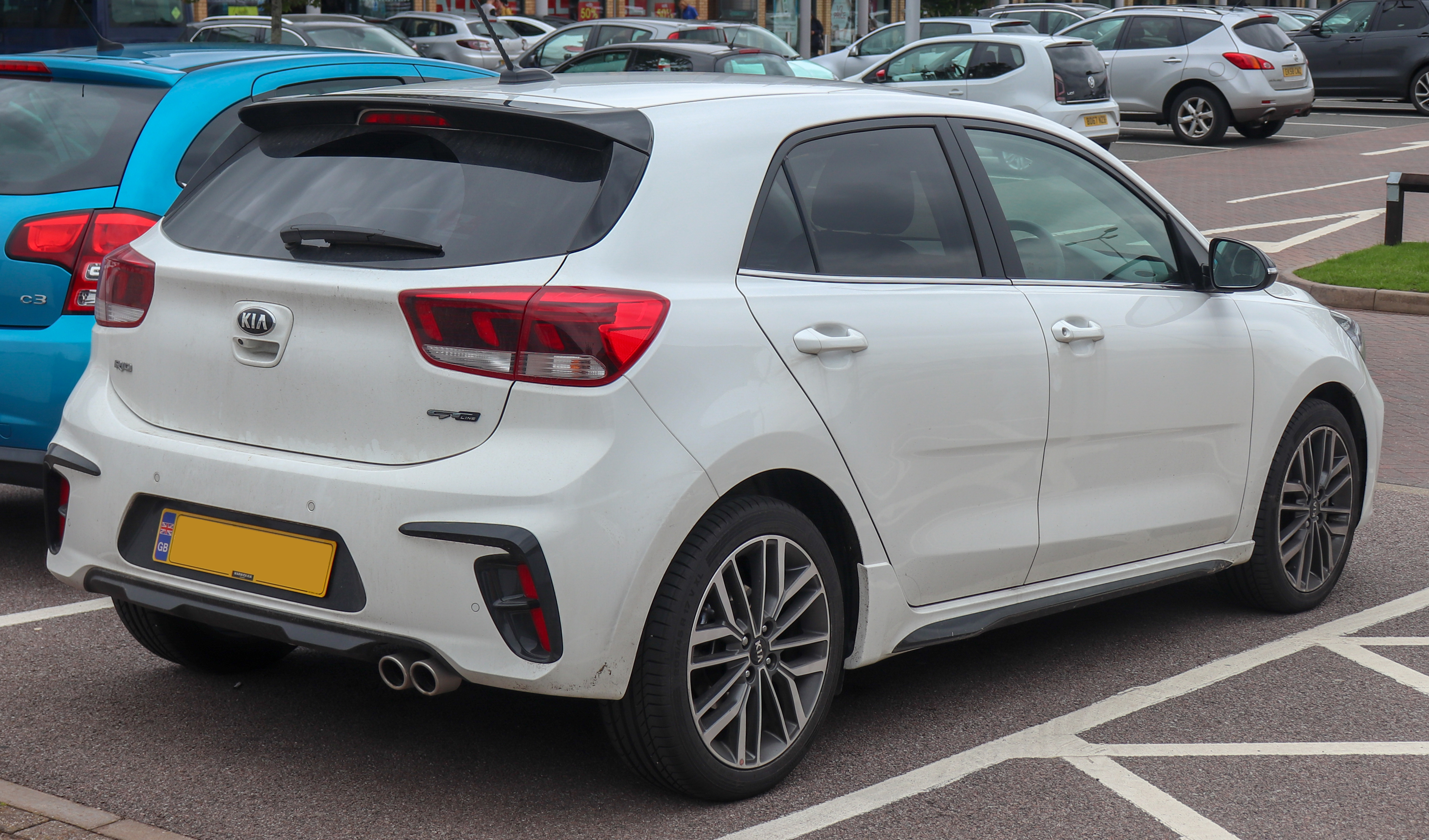
Rear view (GT-Line)

==== Facelift ====
The facelifted Rio featured changes in the front fascia with a revised bumper design. It was first introduced in Europe in May 2020, along with the inclusion of a 1.0-litre mild hybrid engine to replace the previous 1.0-litre T-GDi engine.

The facelifted model went on sale in Mexico in October 2020. In the US and Canada, the facelifted model was introduced in December 2020 for the 2021 model year for both hatchback and sedan models, with upgrades in standard equipment.

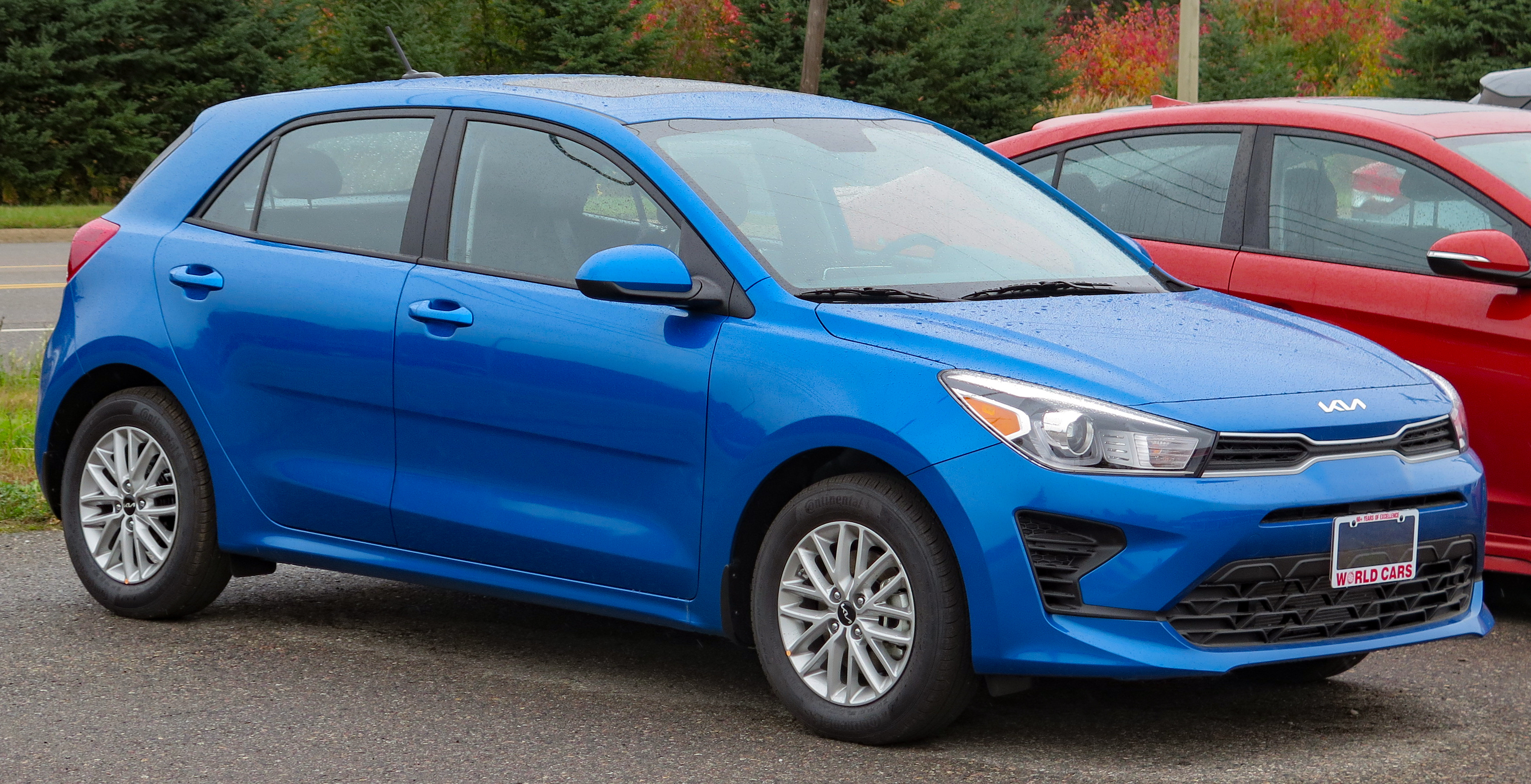
Facelift (hatchback)

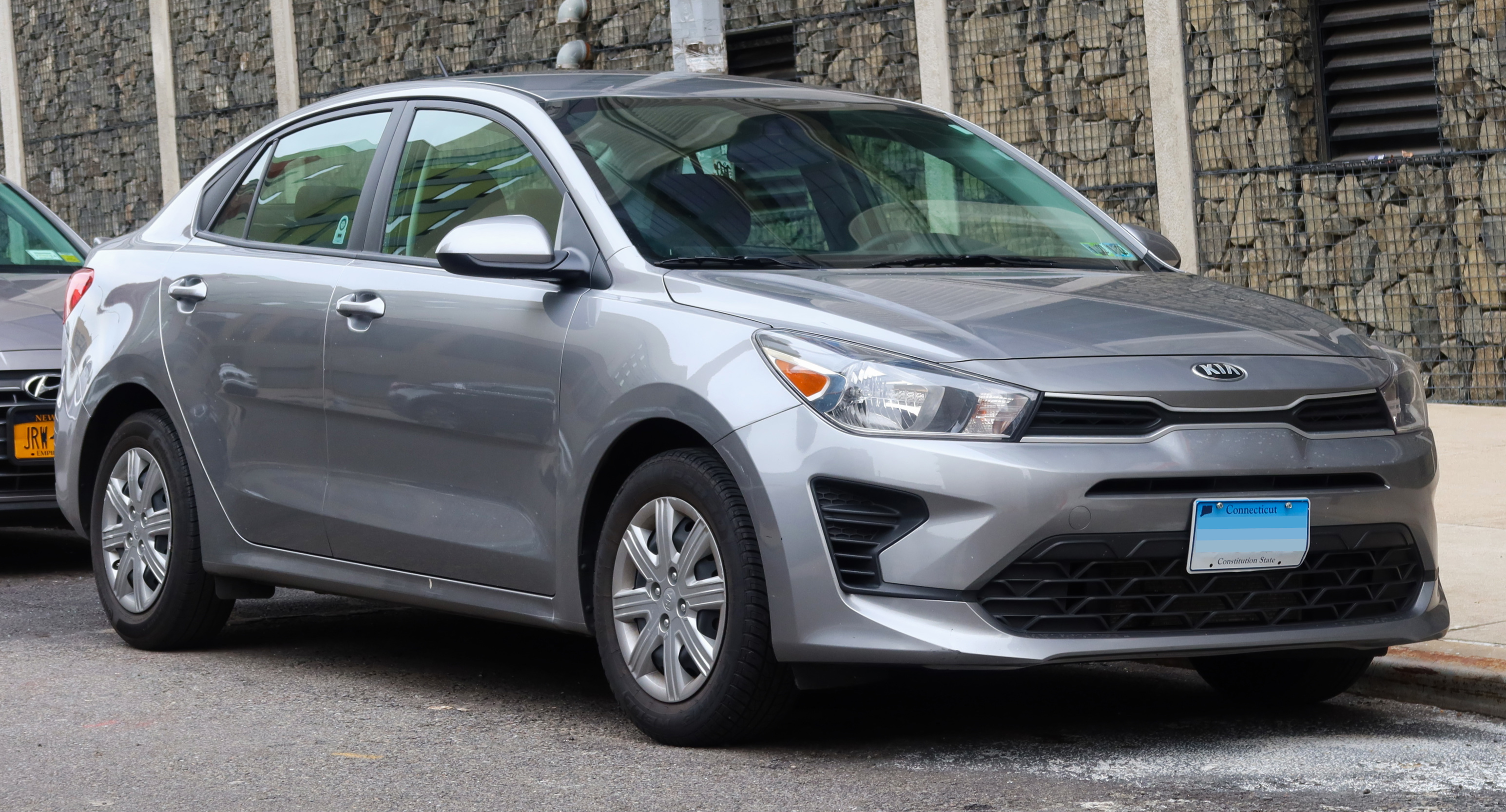
Facelift (sedan)

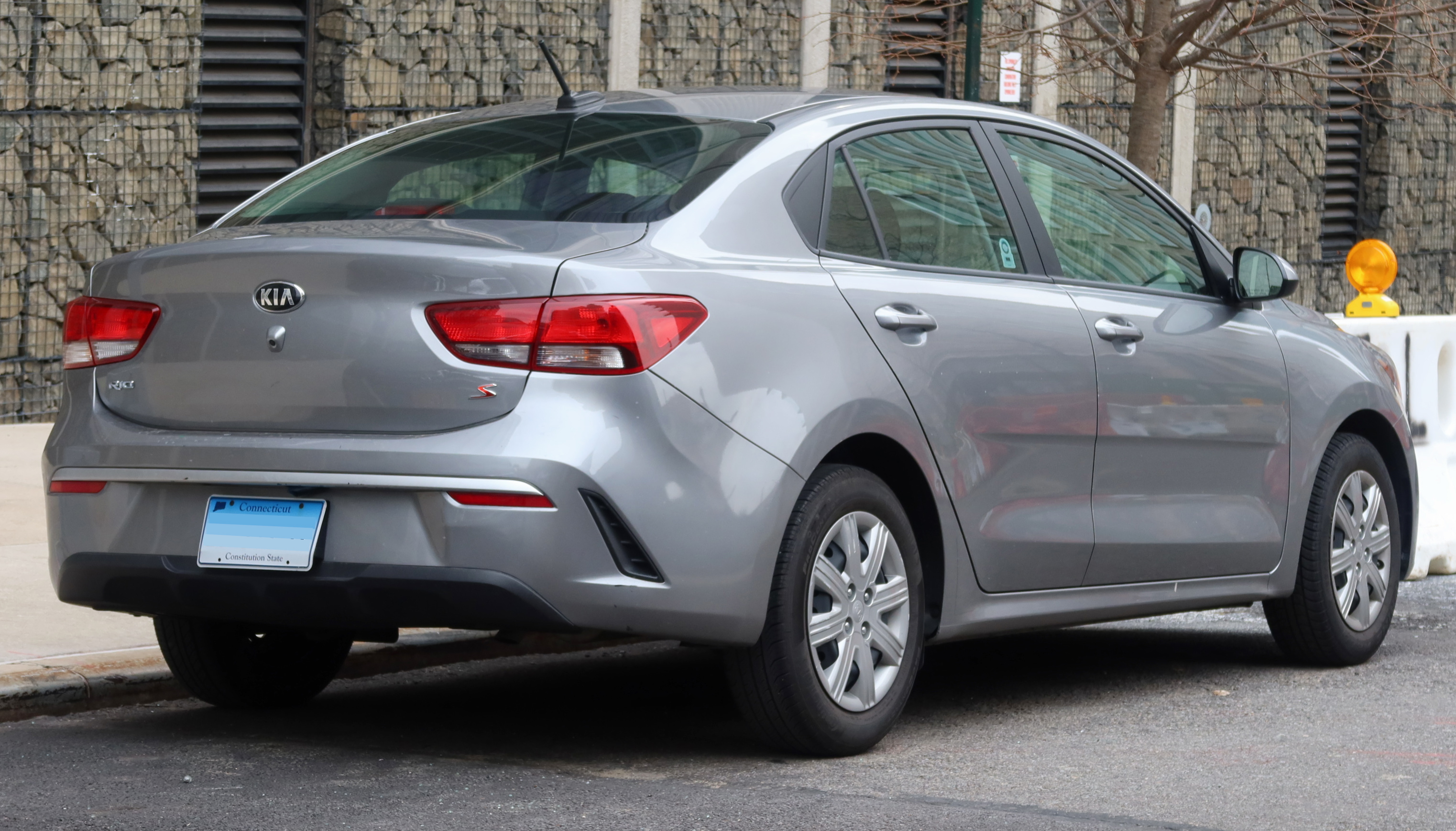
Facelift (sedan)

==== Rio Cross/Tonic ====
A rugged crossover-styled variant of the Rio was released in Colombia as the Kia Tonic. It is also offered in selected Latin America countries such as Panama and Peru as the Rio Cross.

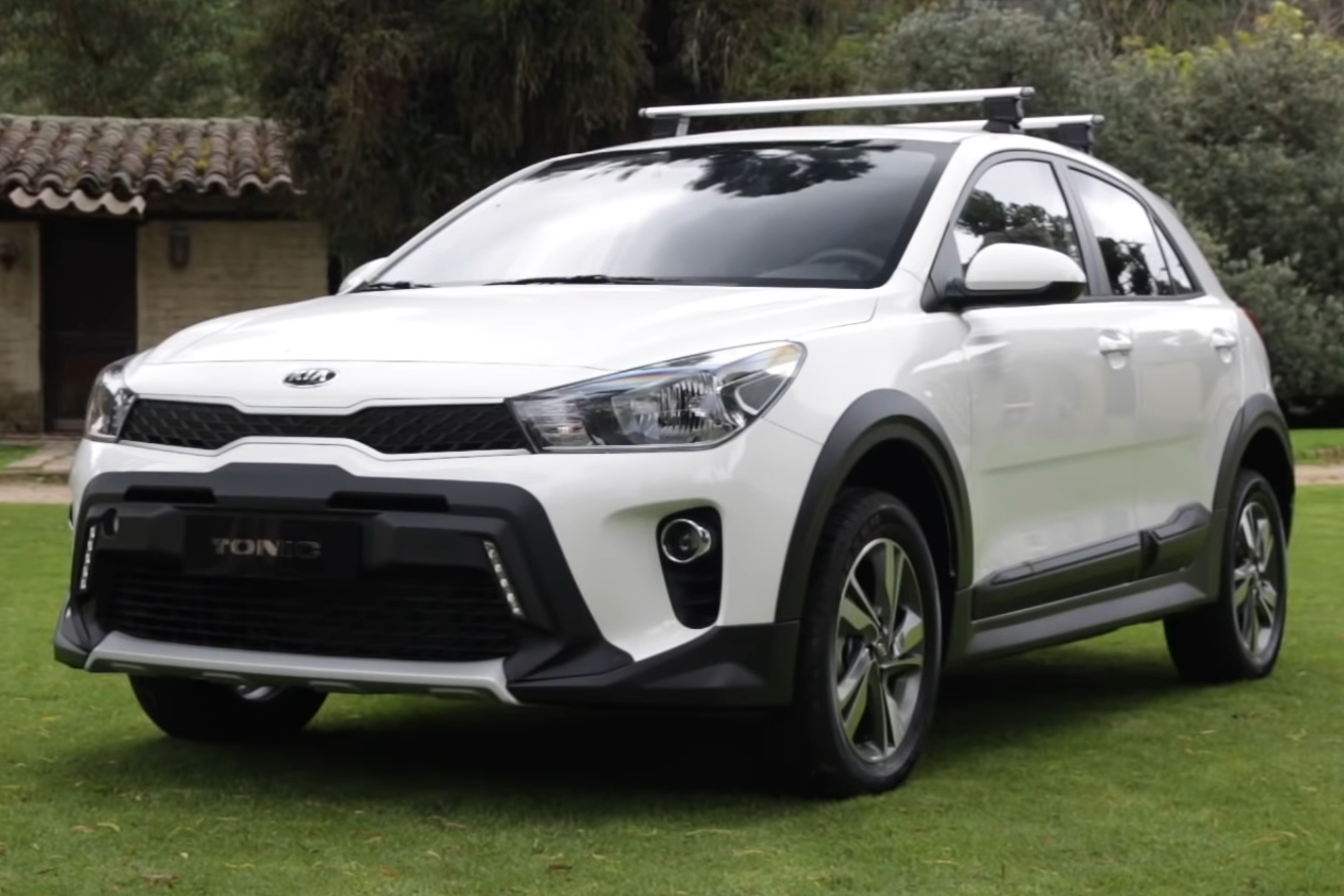
2019 Kia Tonic (Colombia)

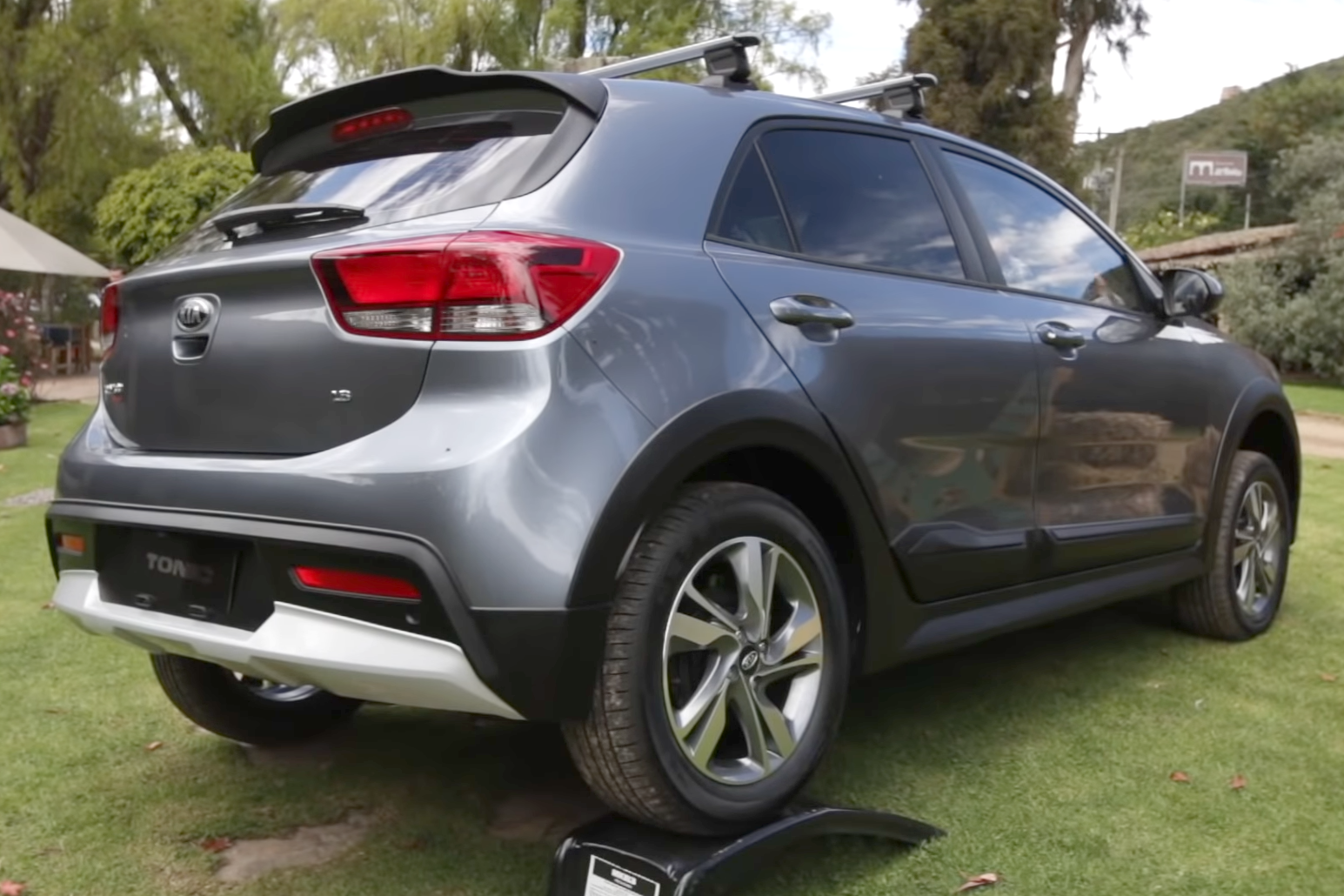
Rear view

==== Awards ====
The YB Rio won the 2017 Red Dot Award for Passenger Car Design and the 2017 iF Design Award for Discipline Product.

==== Safety ====
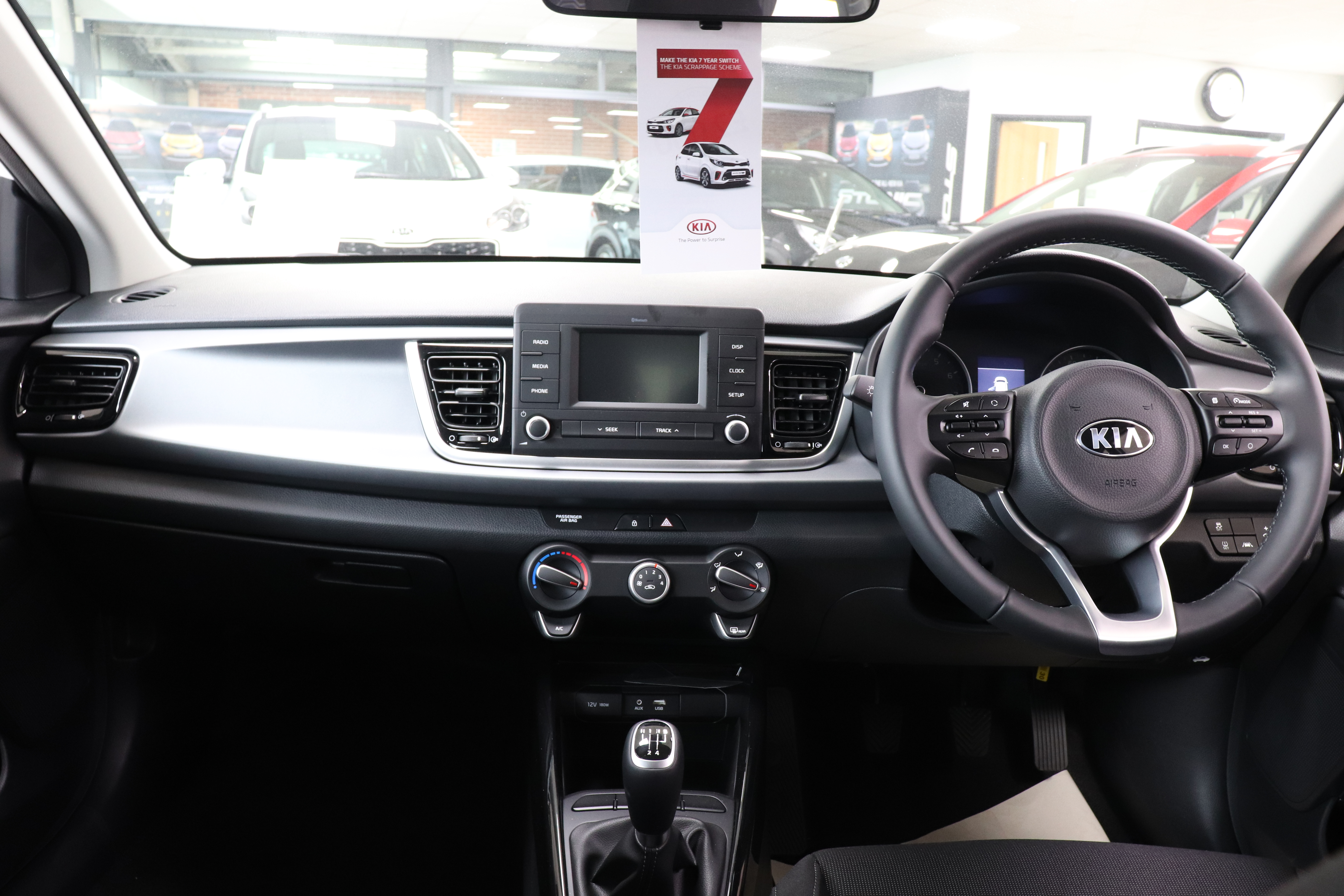
Interior

The Rio has optional rear disc brakes.

===== Latin NCAP =====
The New Rio Sedan with 1 airbag, no ABS and no ESC received 2 stars for adult occupants and 2 stars for toddlers from Latin NCAP 2.0 in August 2017.

Latin NCAP 2.0 test results BYD F0 - NO Airbags (2017, based on Euro NCAP 2008)
Test	Points	Stars
Adult occupant:	23.55/34.0	2 /5 stars
Child occupant:	18.27/49.00	1 /5 stars

===== Euro NCAP =====
Euro NCAP test results for a LHD, 5-door hatchback variant with standard equipment on a 2017 registration:

Euro NCAP test results Kia Rio (2017)
Test	Points	%
Overall:	3 /5 stars	
Adult occupant:	32.5	85%
Child occupant:	41.2	84%
Pedestrian:	26	62%
Safety assist:	3	25%

Euro NCAP test results for a LHD, 5-door hatchback variant with optional safety pack on a 2017 registration:

Euro NCAP test results Kia Rio (2017)
Test	Points	%
Overall:	5 /5 stars	
Adult occupant:	35.5	93%
Child occupant:	41.2	84%
Pedestrian:	29.8	71%
Safety assist:	7.1	59%

===== IIHS =====
====== 2018 ======
IIHS crash test results for an LHD, 4-door sedan variant with standard equipment, 2018 model year, and its top trim won the Top Safety Pick+ award:

IIHS scores
Test	Rating	
Small overlap front:	Good	
Moderate overlap front (driver side):	Good	
Moderate overlap front (passenger side):	Acceptable	
Side:	Good	
Roof strength:	Good	
Head restraints & seats:	Good	
Headlights	Good / Poor	varies by trim/option
Front crash prevention:	Superior	optional
Child seat anchors (Latch) ease of use:	Acceptable	

====== 2023 ======
IIHS crash test results, 2023 model year:

IIHS scores
Test	Rating	
Small overlap front:	Good	
Moderate overlap front (driver side):	Good	
Moderate overlap front (passenger side):	Acceptable	
Side:	Good	
Roof strength:	Good	
Head restraints & seats:	Good	
Headlights	Good / Poor	varies by trim/option
Child seat anchors (Latch) ease of use:	Acceptable	

===== ANCAP =====
ANCAP test results Kia Rio (including Stonic) (2017)
Test	Score
Overall	5 /5 stars
Frontal offset	14.52/16
Side impact	16/16
Pole	2/2
Seat belt reminders	3/3
Whiplash protection	Good
Pedestrian protection	Adequate
Electronic stability control	Standard

=== Russian/Chinese version (FB/UC) ===
Fourth generation
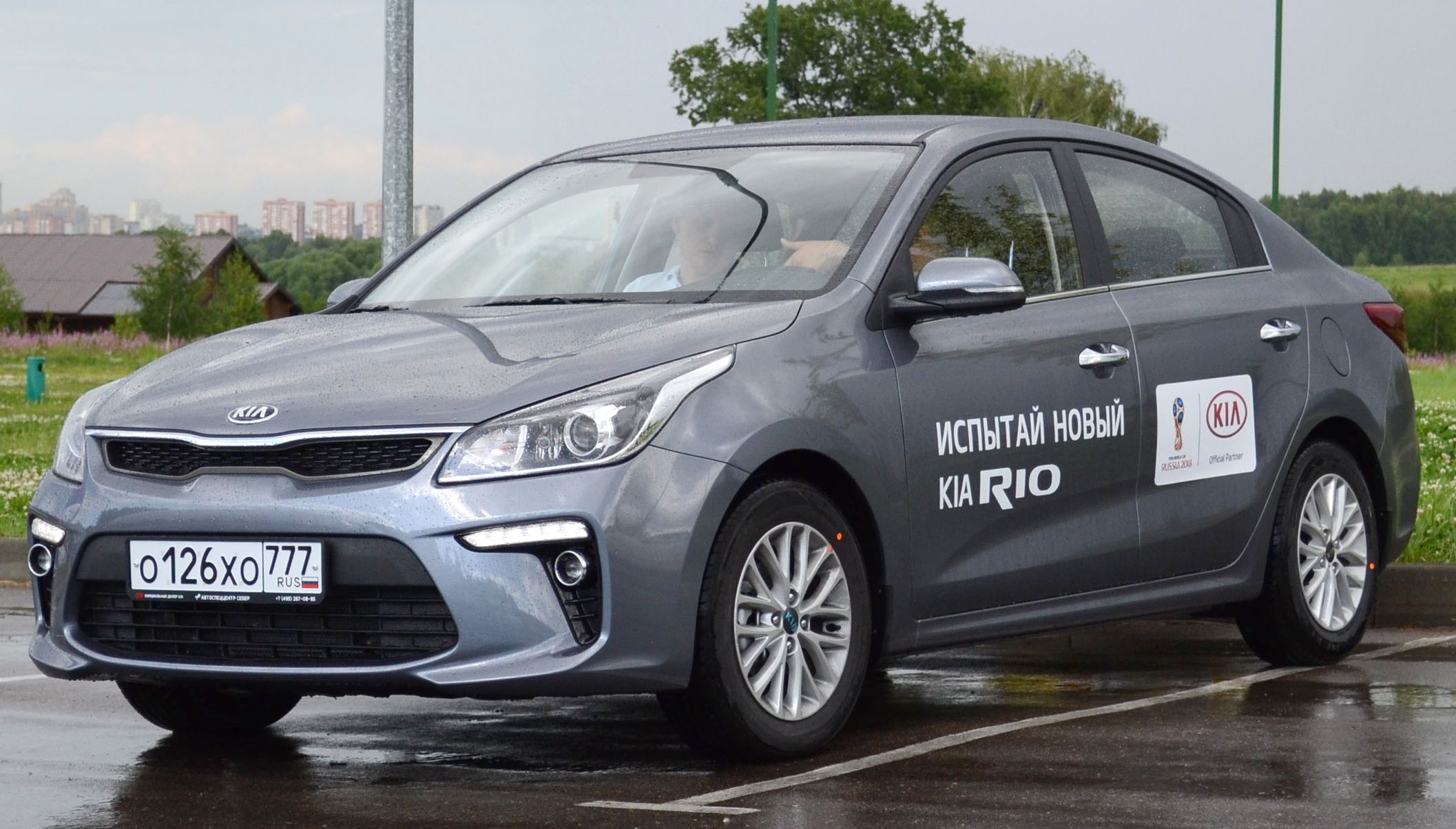
- 2017 Kia Rio (Russia; pre-facelift)

Overview
- Model code: FB/UC
- Also called: Kia K2 (China); Kia KX Cross / K2 Cross (crossover version, China); Solaris KRS / Solaris KRX (Russia; 2024-2026)
- Production: 2017–2022, 2024–2026 (Russia); 2017–2020 (China)
- Assembly: China: Yancheng (DYK); Russia: St. Petersburg (HMMR); Ukraine: Zaporizhia (ZAZ)

Body and chassis
- Body style: 5-door hatchback 4-door sedan
- Platform: Hyundai-Kia K2
- Related: Hyundai Accent/Verna/Solaris (HCi/HCr/YC)

Powertrain
- Engine: Petrol: 1.4 L Kappa I4; 1.6 L Gamma I4
- Transmission: 6-speed manual 6-speed automatic

Dimensions
- Wheelbase: 2,600 mm (102.4 in)
- Length: 4,240–4,275 mm (166.9–168.3 in) (hatchback); 4,400–4,420 mm (173.2–174.0 in) (sedan)
- Width: 1,740–1,750 mm (68.5–68.9 in)
- Height: 1,510 mm (59.4 in) (hatchback); 1,470 mm (57.9 in) (sedan)
- Curb weight: 1,115–1,151 kg (2,458–2,538 lb)

The Rio produced and marketed in Russia and China (as the K2 and KX Cross) is internally referred to by the FB or UC model codes. The version for Russia differs with the YB Rio with a different design, longer wheelbase, a different line of engines and suspension settings.

The model was unveiled in Russia in June 2017. Compared to its predecessor, the QB Rio, the FB Rio received improved suspension tuning and an electric power steering. In terms of dimensions, the sedan model is 23 mm (0.9 in) longer, 40 mm (1.6 in) wider, and has a 30 mm (1.2 in) longer wheelbase. Due to the revised rear suspension configuration, trunk space of the sedan model was reduced from 500 to 480 litres (17.7 to 17.0 cu ft). The 1.4-litre Gamma engine was replaced by the Kappa engine of the similar displacement, while the 1.6-litre Gamma engine option was retained from the previous generation. Compared to previous generations, the Kia K2 and Kia Rio sedan uses a different bumper design, while the Kia Rio X uses the same bumper design compared to a China-built KX Cross.

Production of the FB Rio sedan began on 4 July 2017 at the Hyundai plant in Saint Petersburg alongside the related Hyundai Solaris, and sales began on 1 August 2017. It was also offered in Ukraine and in various CIS countries, such as Belarus, Armenia, Azerbaijan and Kazakhstan.

The facelifted Kia Rio was launched to the Russian market in 2020. The updated model features a reshaped headlights and front bumper, with LED headlights in offer for higher grade levels.

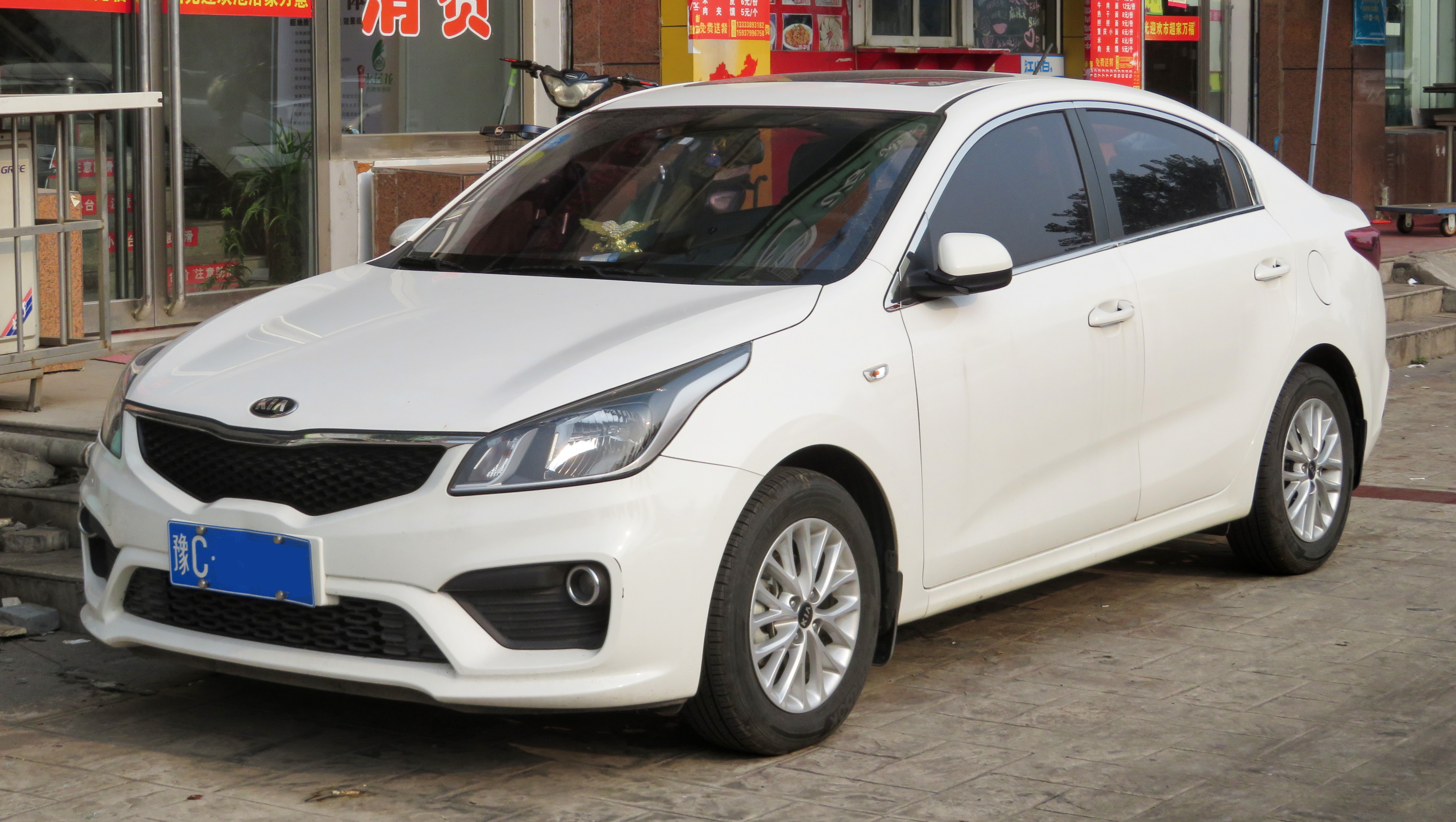
Kia K2 sedan (China)

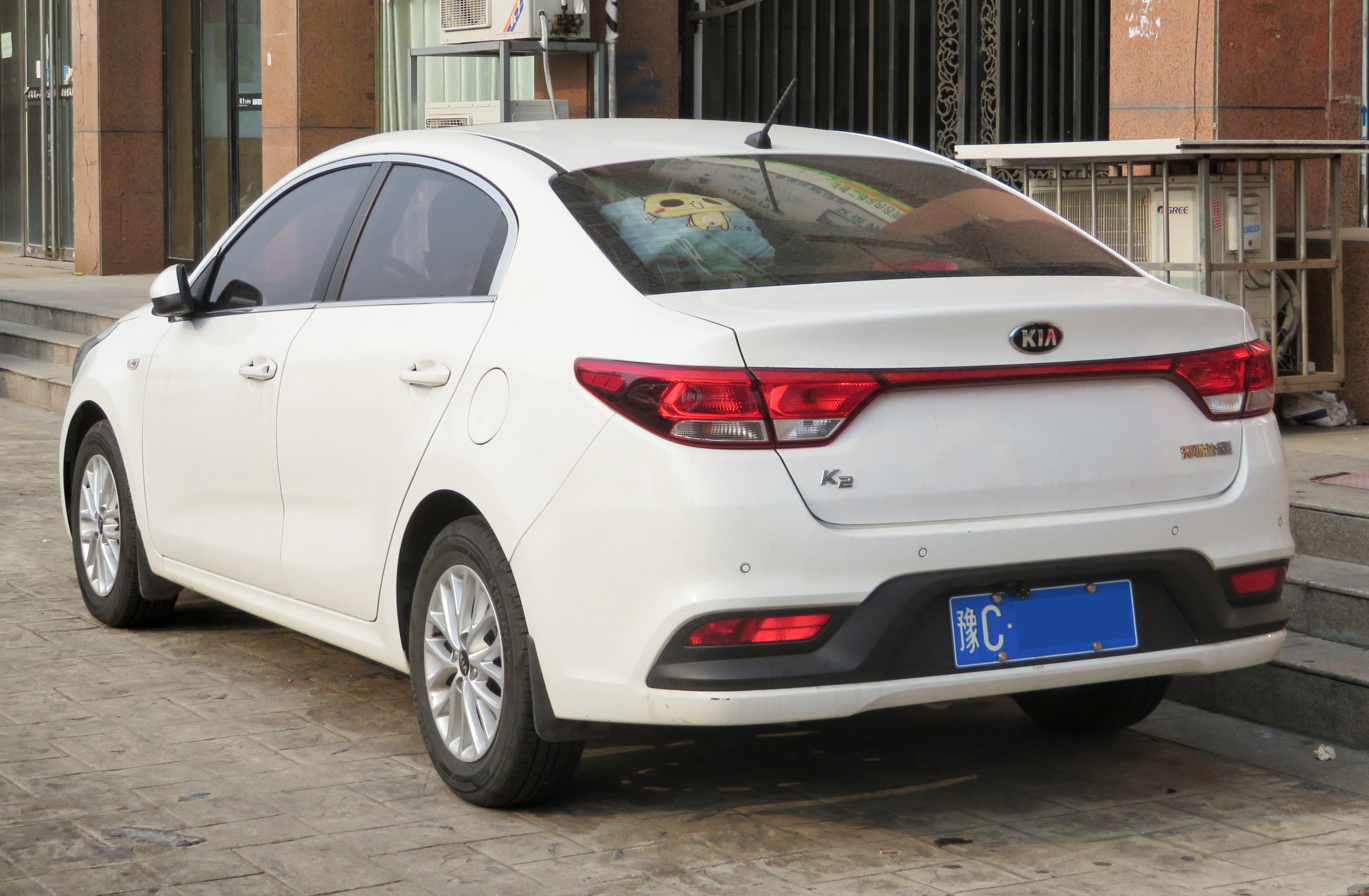
Kia K2 sedan (China)

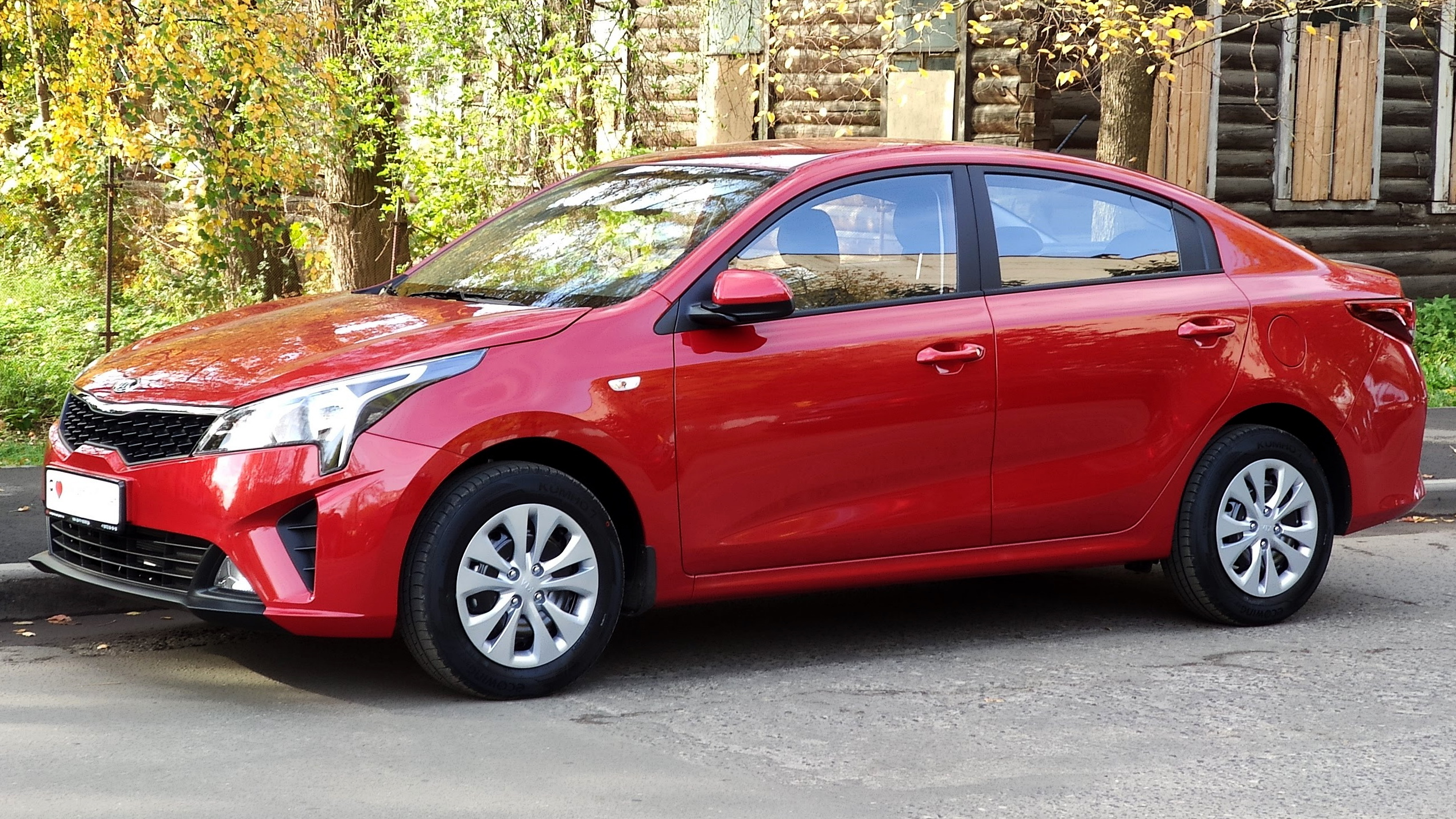
2020 Kia Rio (Russia; facelift)

==== Crossover versions ====
In October 2017, Kia Russia introduced the Rio X-Line as a crossover-styled hatchback version of the FB Rio. The Rio X-Line has an increased ground clearance of 10 mm, modified suspension settings, and unpainted plastic body claddings to mimic crossover styling. Sales began in Russia on 14 November 2017. The Rio X-Line was also introduced in China at the 2017 Auto Shanghai as the Kia KX Cross. The KX Cross is 30 mm (1.2 in) wider and 40 mm (1.6 in) longer than the standard Rio hatchback.

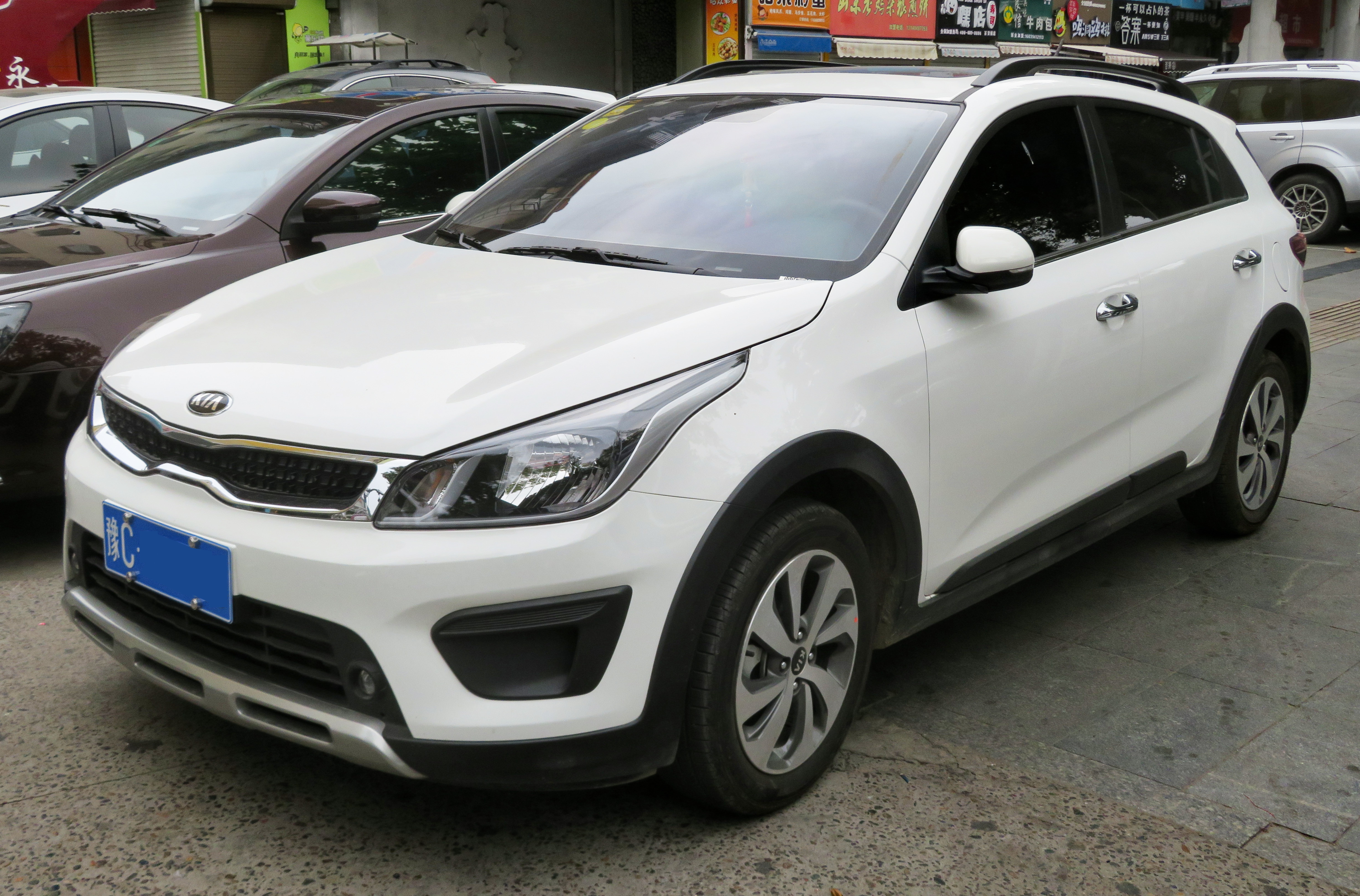
Kia KX Cross (China)

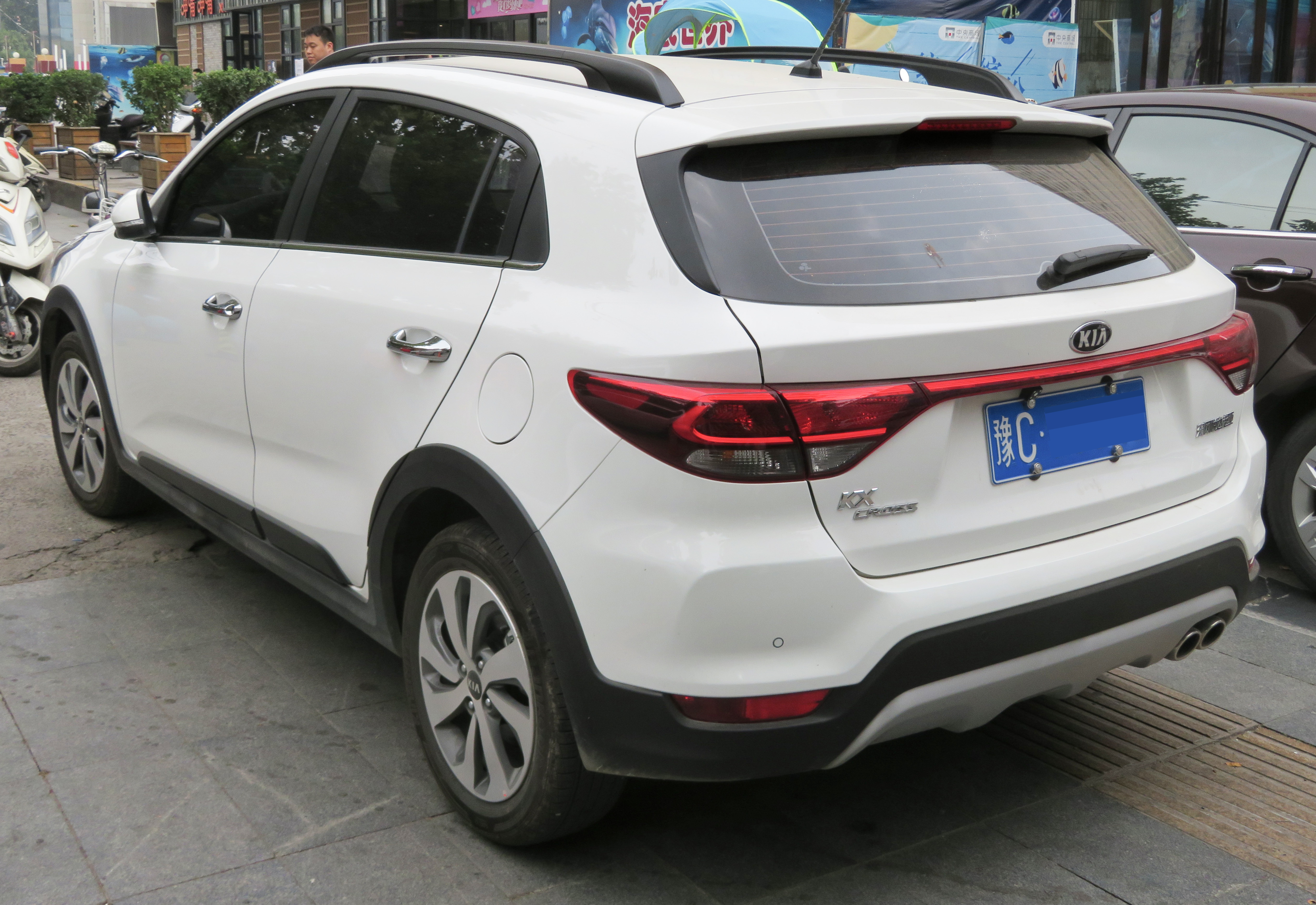
Kia KX Cross (China)

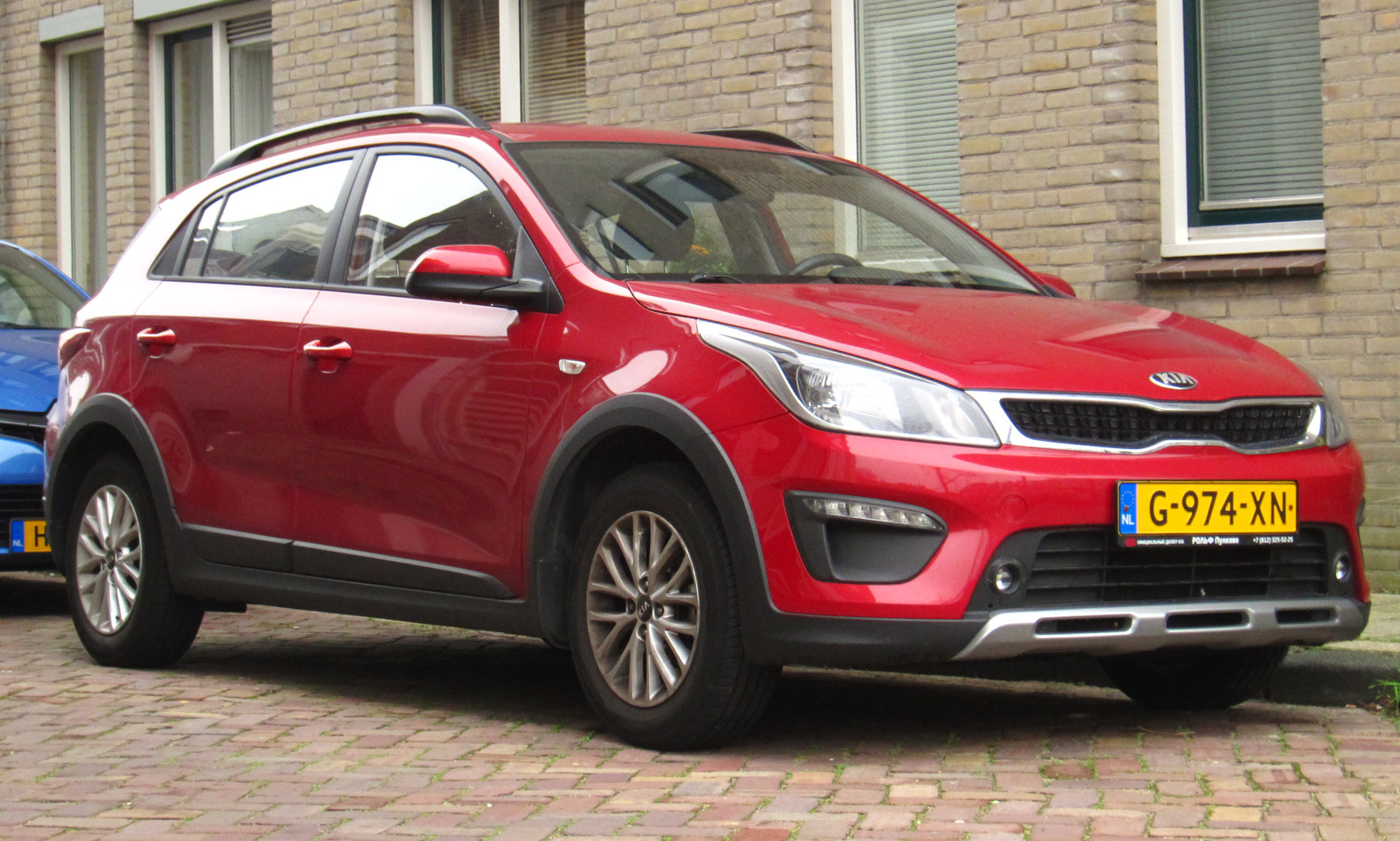
2018 Kia Rio X-Line 1.6 (Netherlands)

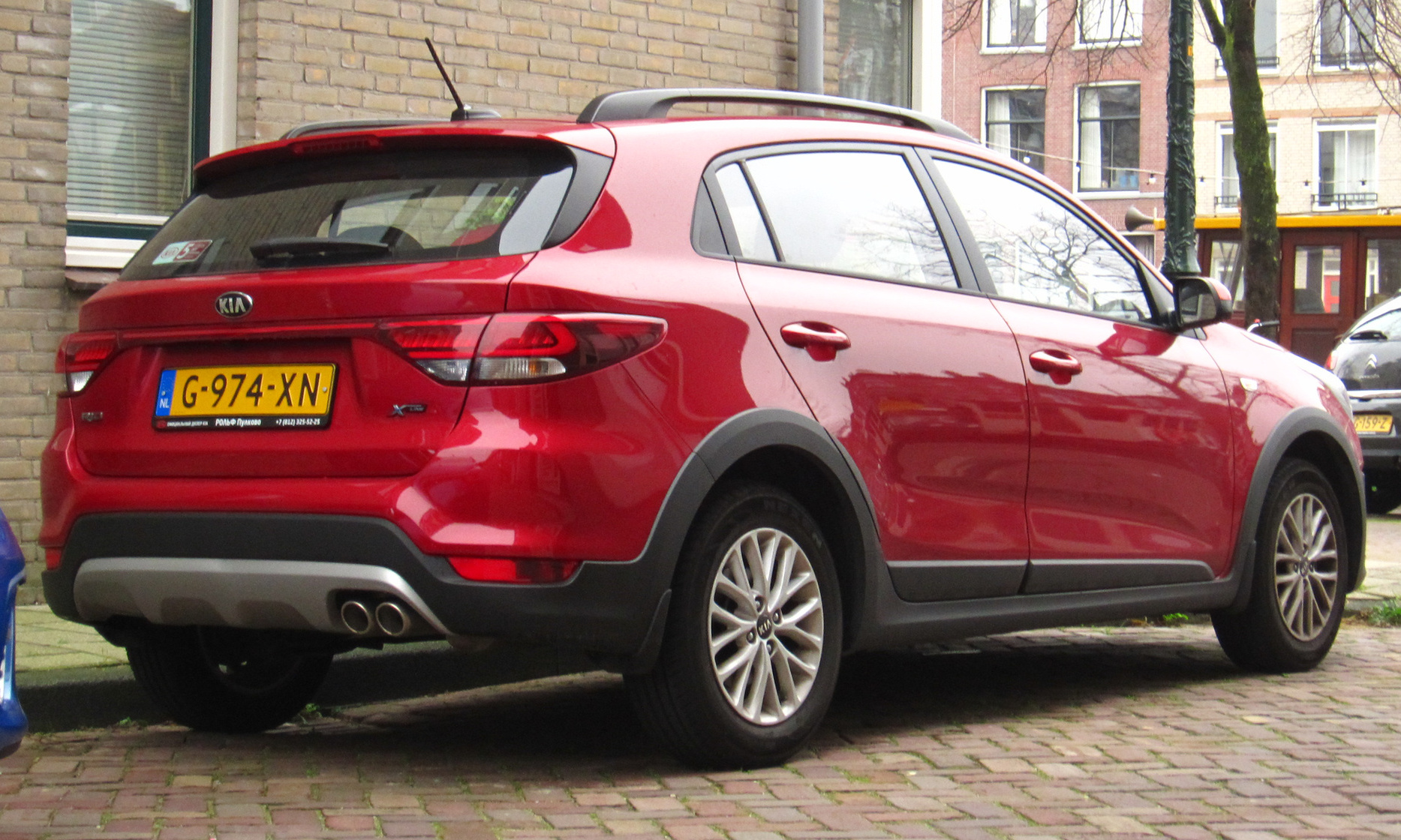
2018 Kia Rio X-Line 1.6 (Netherlands)

== Successor ==
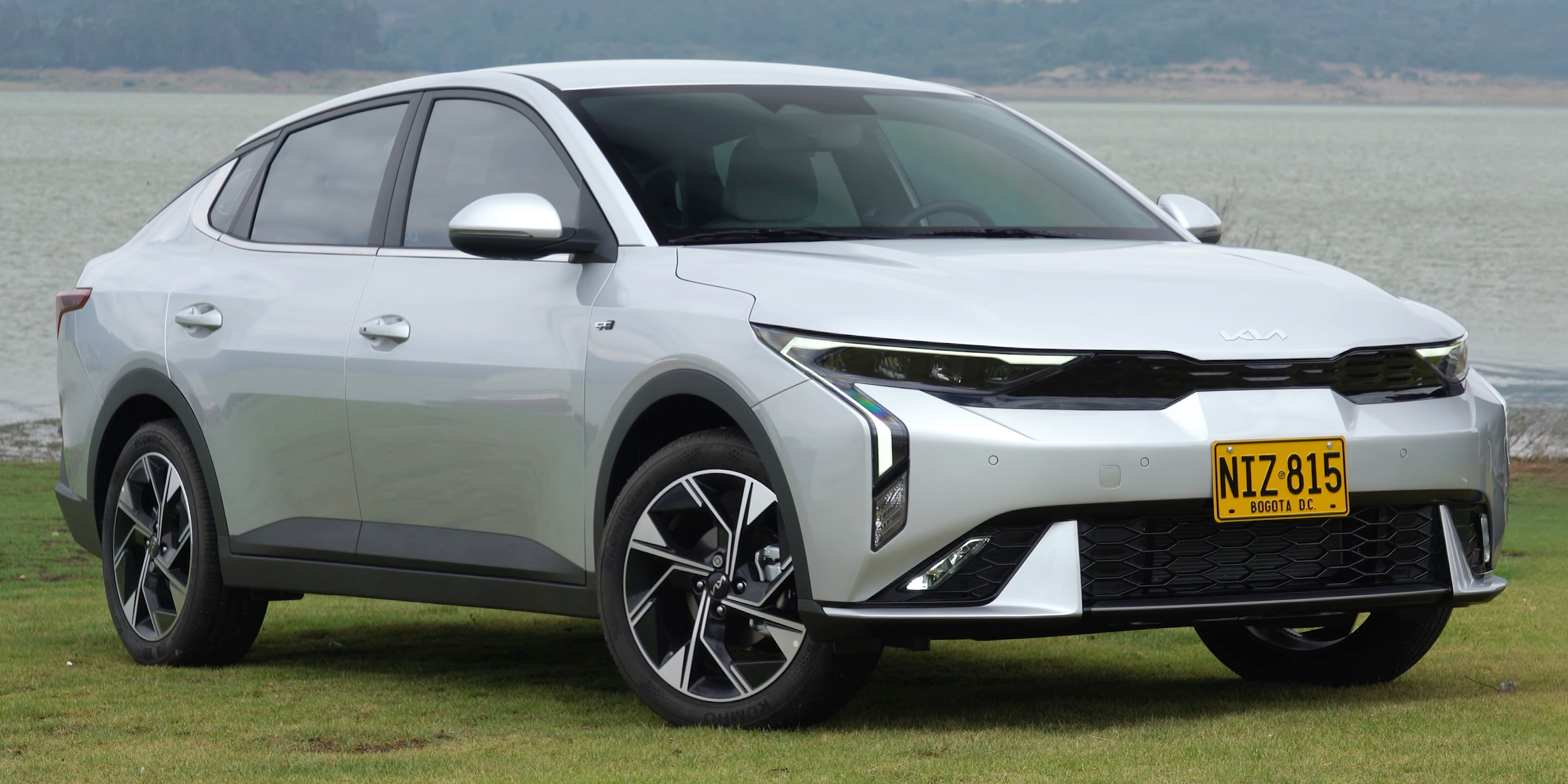
2024 Kia K3 Sedan

The fourth-generation Rio was succeeded by the K3, which was introduced in August 2023. The K3 nameplate was previously used by the Chinese and South Korean market Forte/Cerato which is a segment above the Rio. The Forte/Cerato was succeeded by the K4 in 2024.

== Sales ==
The Rio/K2 was Kia's best selling model worldwide in 2012 and 2015. It contributed almost half a million annual sales to Kia.

Year	Europe	U.S.	Mexico	South Korea	Global
2000	2,904	16,624		24,216	
2001	17,570	51,541		18,651	
2002	25,138	51,195		19,837	
2003	34,436	41,285		7,844	
2004	32,629	38,518		2,273	
2005	27,859	30,290		15,663	
2006	30,759	28,388		23,045	
2007	22,288	33,370		25,919	
2008	20,268	36,532		22,197	
2009	25,020	34,666		18,532	
2010	19,335	24,619		14,339	
2011	30,730	20,111		15,537	
2012	69,752	40,275		16,380	466,826
2013	58,041	40,742		11,037	
2014	58,425	35,933		8,893	
2015	63,930	23,742		6,987	466,573
2016	67,622	28,700	12,138	4,158	445,404
2017	70,309	16,760	29,096	2,028	252,327
2018	45,654	22,975	32,904		167,422
2019	39,721	24,961	36,730		264,535
2020	33,052	23,927	29,014		
2021	34,265	31,362	35,249		147,966
2022	33,613	26,996	50,958		
2023	25,959	26,804	40,490		
