= Rena =

Renas may refer to:

== Places ==
- Rena, Badajoz, a municipality in Extremadura, Spain
- Rena, Norway, a village in Innlandet county, Norway
- Rena, Washington, a community in Clallam County, Washington, United States

== People ==
- Rena (given name), list of people with this name
- Rena (footballer), a Portuguese footballer

== Other uses ==
- MV Rena, a container ship that ran aground off New Zealand in 2011, resulting in an oil spill
- Rena (snake), a genus of blind snakes in the family Leptotyphlopidae
- Rena (film)

== See also ==
- Reina (disambiguation)
- Reyna (disambiguation)

Rena Albanian special police force
