= Rena (given name) =

Rena is a given name.

== Notable people with this name ==
- Rena Bakhshi, Dutch computer scientist and mathematician
- Rena DeAngelo, American set decorator
- Rena Effendi (born 1977), Azerbaijani photographer
- Rena Hasegawa (長谷川 玲奈; born 2001), Japanese voice actress, singer and idol
- Rena Karefa-Smart (1921–2019), American religious leader and theologian
- Rena Kato (加藤 玲奈; born 1997), Japanese singer and idol
- Rena Kornreich Gelissen (1920–2006), writer and survivor of the Holocaust
- Rena Kubota (born 1991), Japanese female kickboxer
- Rena Matsui (born 1991), Japanese female idol
- Rena Mero (born 1967), American WWE professional wrestler, better known as Sable
- Rena Sofer (born 1968), American actress
- Rena Takase (born 1980), Japanese professional wrestler
- Rena Takeda (born 1997), Japanese actress
- Rena Takeshita, Japanese fashion model/actress
- Rena Vlahopoulou (1923–2004), Greek actress and singer
- Rena Wakama (born 1992), Nigerian basketball coach and former player
- Rena (footballer) (born 1994), Portuguese footballer
- Rena Nozawa, Japanese female idol, former member of AKB48
- Rena Kang, Korean female rapper from the idol group Pristin

== Fictional characters ==
- Cyberdoll Rena in Hand Maid May
- Rena in the video game Sky Punks
- Rena Andou in Girls und Panzer
- Rena Hirose in the video game Ace Combat 3: Electrosphere (Japanese version)
- Rena Kunisaki in the manga .hack//Legend of the Twilight
- Rena Lanford in the video game Star Ocean: The Second Story
- Rena Niimi, in the film Battle Royale II: Requiem
- Rena Ryūgū in Higurashi no Naku Koro ni
- Rena Sayers in anime series My-Otome
- Rena Yanase in Ultraman Tiga
- Rena Erindel in Elsword

== See also ==
- Rena (disambiguation)
