= Retina (disambiguation) =

The retina is a light-sensitive layer of tissue, lining the inner surface of the eye.

Retina may also refer to:

- Kodak Retina, a series of cameras made from 1936 to 1969
- Retina Display, brand names used by Apple Inc. for screens with a high pixel density
- Retina (film), a 2017 American thriller film
- Retina (typeface), a font created by Tobias Frere-Jones
- Retina Foundation, a former name of Schepens Eye Research Institute
- Retina (or More Fun Than a Vat of Love), a 2010 album by How to Swim
- Retina (software), a network vulnerability scanner application
- Retina UK, a British charity that works for people affected by inherited sight loss
- "Retina", a song by Trust Company from True Parallels (2005)

== See also ==
- Ratina (disambiguation)
- Retinal, a form of vitamin A
- Retinia, a genus of moths
