= Reinas =

Reinas can refer to:

- Reinas (film), 2024 drama film directed by Klaudia Reynickle
- Queens (film), Spanish film of 2005 directed by Manuel Gómez Pereira
- Queens (TV series), Spanish TV series of 2017 produced by José Luis Moreno
- The plural of Reina, queen, in Spanish
