= Reina (surname) =

Reina is a surname. Notable people with the surname include:

- Antonio Manuel Reina (born 1981), Spanish middle-distance runner
- Armando Betancourt Reina, Cuban journalist and author
- Baldassare Reina (born 1970), Catholic prelate, official of the Diocese of Rome
- Carlos Roberto Reina (1926–2003), former President of Honduras
- Calcedonio Reina (1842–1911), Italian painter and poet
- Casiodoro de Reina (1520–1594), Spanish Lutheran theologian
- Daniela Reina (born 1981), Italian sprinter
- Dennis Reina (born 1950), American psychologist and author
- Domenico Reina (1796–1843), Swiss bel canto tenor
- Gaetano Reina (1889–1930), Boss of the Lucchese crime family
- Giuseppe Reina (born 1972), German footballer
- Harold Reina (born 1990), Colombian footballer
- Javier Reina (born 1989), Colombian footballer
- Juanita Reina (1925–1999), Spanish actress and singer
- Laura Reina, Italian and American physicist
- Loris Reina (born 1980), French footballer
- María del Carmen Reina Jiménez (born 1942), Spanish essayist, writer, activist and politician
- Miguel Reina (born 1946), Spanish footballer, and father of Pepe Reina
- Miguel A. Reina (born 1980), Mexican filmmaker
- Pepe Reina (born 1982), Spanish footballer
- Ricky Reina (born 1971), English footballer
- Roger Reina, American wrestling coach
- Sergio Reina (born 1985), Colombian footballer
- Sisto Reina (died 1664), Italian composer

== See also ==
- Reina (given name)
- Reina (disambiguation)
