= Raina =

Raina may refer to:

== People ==
=== Given name ===
- Raina (singer), stage name of Oh Hye-rin (born 1989), lead singer of the South Korean girl group After School
- Raina A. Mercedes Echerer (born 1963), Austrian actress and politician
- Raina Forbin, Haitian politician
- Raina Hein (born c. 1988), American model and runner-up on America's Next Top Model (cycle 14)
- Raina Kabaivanska (born 1934), Bulgarian opera singer
- Rayna Knyaginya (1856–1917), Bulgarian teacher and revolutionary
- Raina Telgemeier (born 1977), American cartoonist

=== Surname ===
- Alessandro Raina (born 1977), Italian songwriter
- Ankita Raina (born 1993), Indian tennis player
- M. K. Raina (born 1948), Indian theatre actor and director
- Mohit Raina (fl. 2004-present), Indian actor
- Suresh Raina (born 1986), Indian cricketer
- Samay Raina (born 1997), Indian comedian
- Vineet Raina, Indian actor
- Jasmeet Singh Raina (born 1989), Indian-Canadian comedian known by the stage name Jus Reign

== Fictional characters ==
- Raina Petkoff, the heroine in George Bernard Shaw's Arms and the Man
- Raina Thorpe, on the TV show Gossip Girl
- Raina (Marvel Cinematic Universe), from Marvel's Agents of S.H.I.E.L.D.
- Raina, on the TV series Cleopatra 2525

== Geography ==
- Raina, Bardhaman, a village with a police station, in Bardhaman district, West Bengal, India
- Raina I, community development block, in West Bengal, India
- Raina II, community development block, in West Bengal, India
- Raina (Vidhan Sabha constituency) in West Bengal India
- Reineh (sometimes transliterated as Raina), an Arab town in Israel

== See also ==
- Ratina (disambiguation)
- Reina (disambiguation)
- Reina (given name)
- Raina (surname)
