= Ratina (disambiguation) =

Ratina may refer to:

== Places ==
- Ratina, a suburban community in the municipality of Kraljevo, Serbia
- Ratina (district), a district in the city of Tampere, Finland
  - Ratina (shopping centre), a shopping mall in the district
  - Ratina Stadium, a multi-purpose stadium in the district

== See also ==
- Raina (disambiguation)
- Retina (disambiguation)
