= Hyundai Celesta =

Chinese automobile

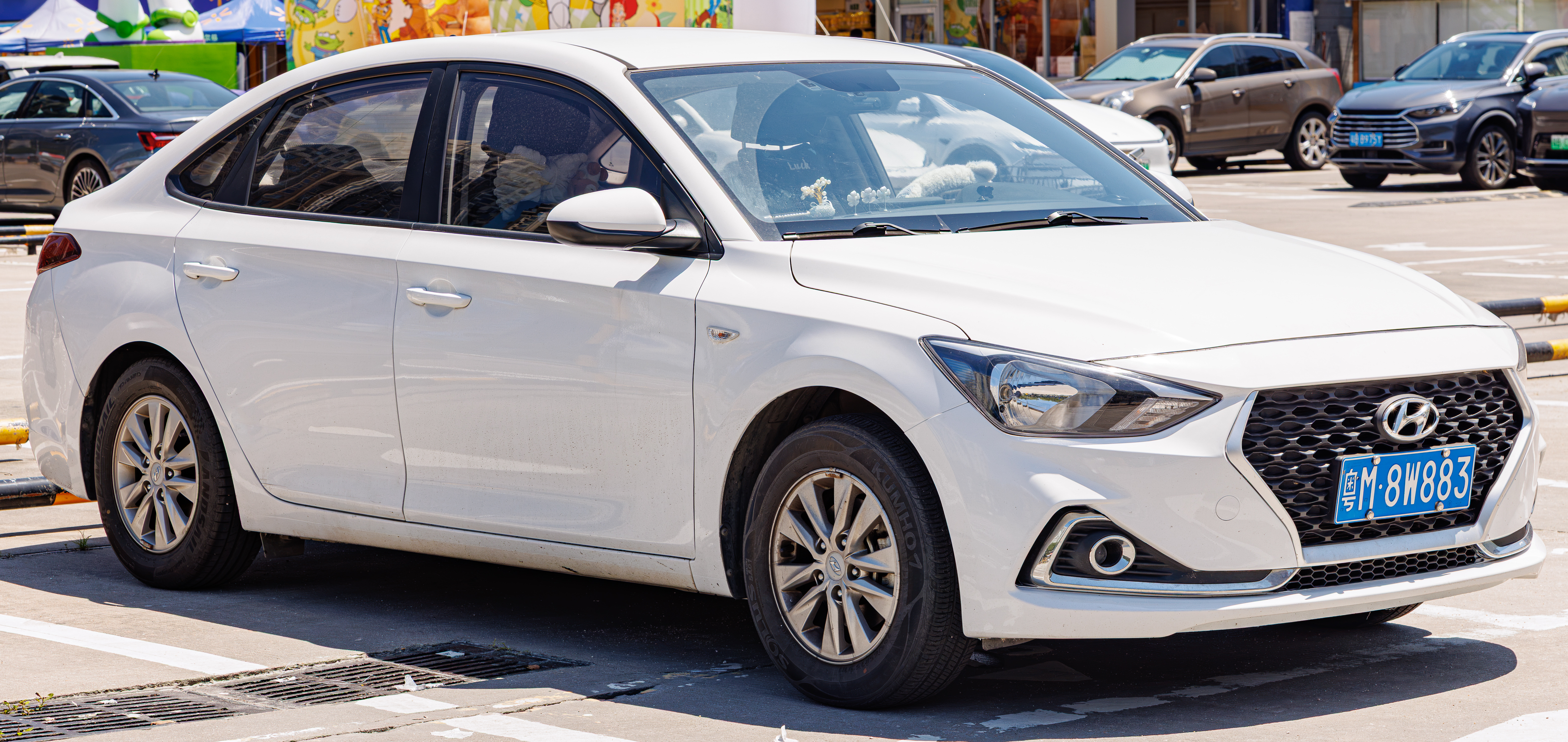
- Hyundai Celesta (China)

Overview
- Manufacturer: Hyundai
- Model code: ID
- Production: 2017–2023
- Assembly: China: Beijing (Beijing Hyundai)

Body and chassis
- Class: Compact car (C)
- Body style: 4-door sedan 5-door station wagon
- Related: Hyundai Elantra (HD)

Powertrain
- Engine: Petrol: 1.4 L Kappa II T-GDi I4; 1.6 L Gamma MPi I4
- Transmission: 6-speed manual; 6-speed automatic; 7 speed DCT

Dimensions
- Wheelbase: 2,650 mm (104.3 in)
- Length: 4,510 mm (177.6 in) (sedan); 4,405 mm (173.4 in) (station wagon)
- Width: 1,765 mm (69.5 in) (sedan); 1,750 mm (68.9 in) (station wagon)
- Height: 1,470 mm (57.9 in)
- Curb weight: 1,120–1,190 kg (2,469–2,624 lb)

The Hyundai Celesta (Chinese: 现代悦动; pinyin: Xiàndài Yuèdòng) is a compact car produced by the Beijing Hyundai joint venture since 2017 to 2023, replacing the extended production of the Hyundai Elantra Yuedong.

== Overview ==
=== Celesta ===
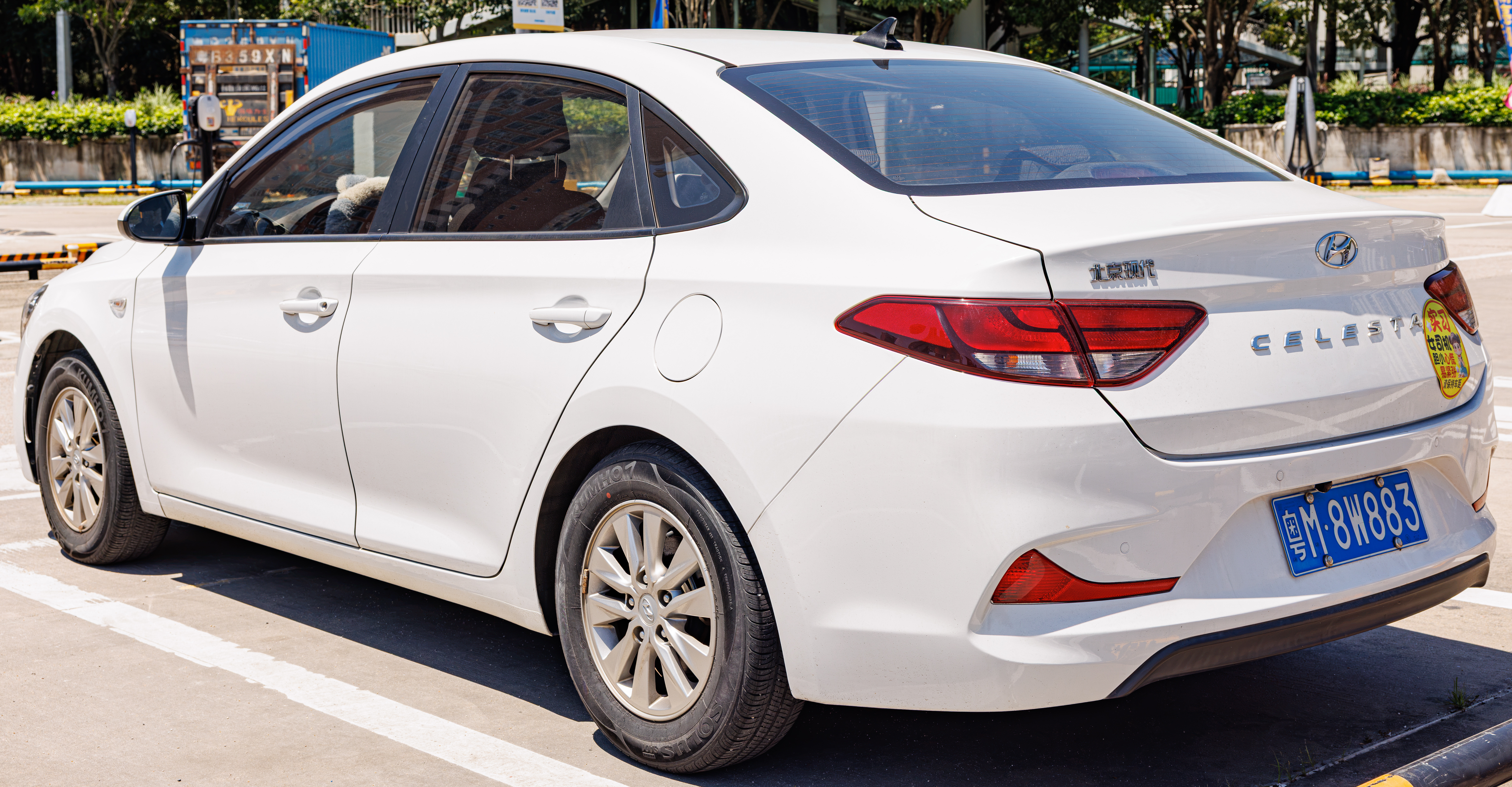
Rear view

Unveiled on the 2016 Guangzhou Auto Show, the Celesta is essentially a restyled and updated Hyundai Elantra Yuedong (A continuation of the fourth generation Hyundai Elantra). Production of the fourth generation Hyundai Elantra in South Korea ended in 2010, but production was carried on in China by the Beijing Hyundai joint venture. The Celesta would be sold alongside its predecessor, the Hyundai Elantra Yuedong, and sit slightly higher in the market.

There is only one engine available for the Celesta, which is a 1.6-litre engine producing 122 hp (91 kW; 124 PS), mated to a 6-speed automatic transmission or a 6-speed manual transmission.

=== Celesta RV ===
A station wagon version of the Celesta called the Celesta RV (Chinese: 逸行; pinyin: Yì xíng) was launched in September 2018.

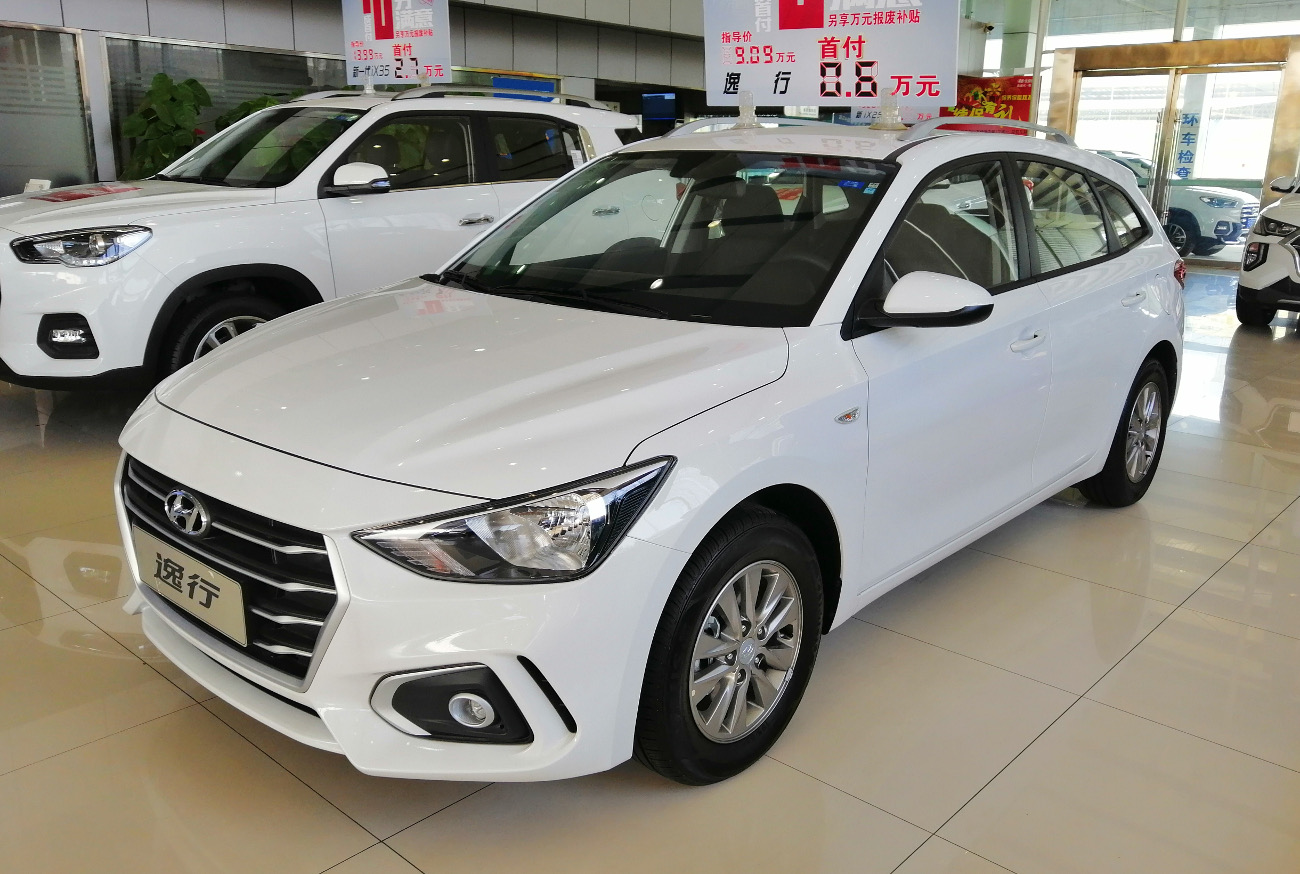
Hyundai Celesta RV front

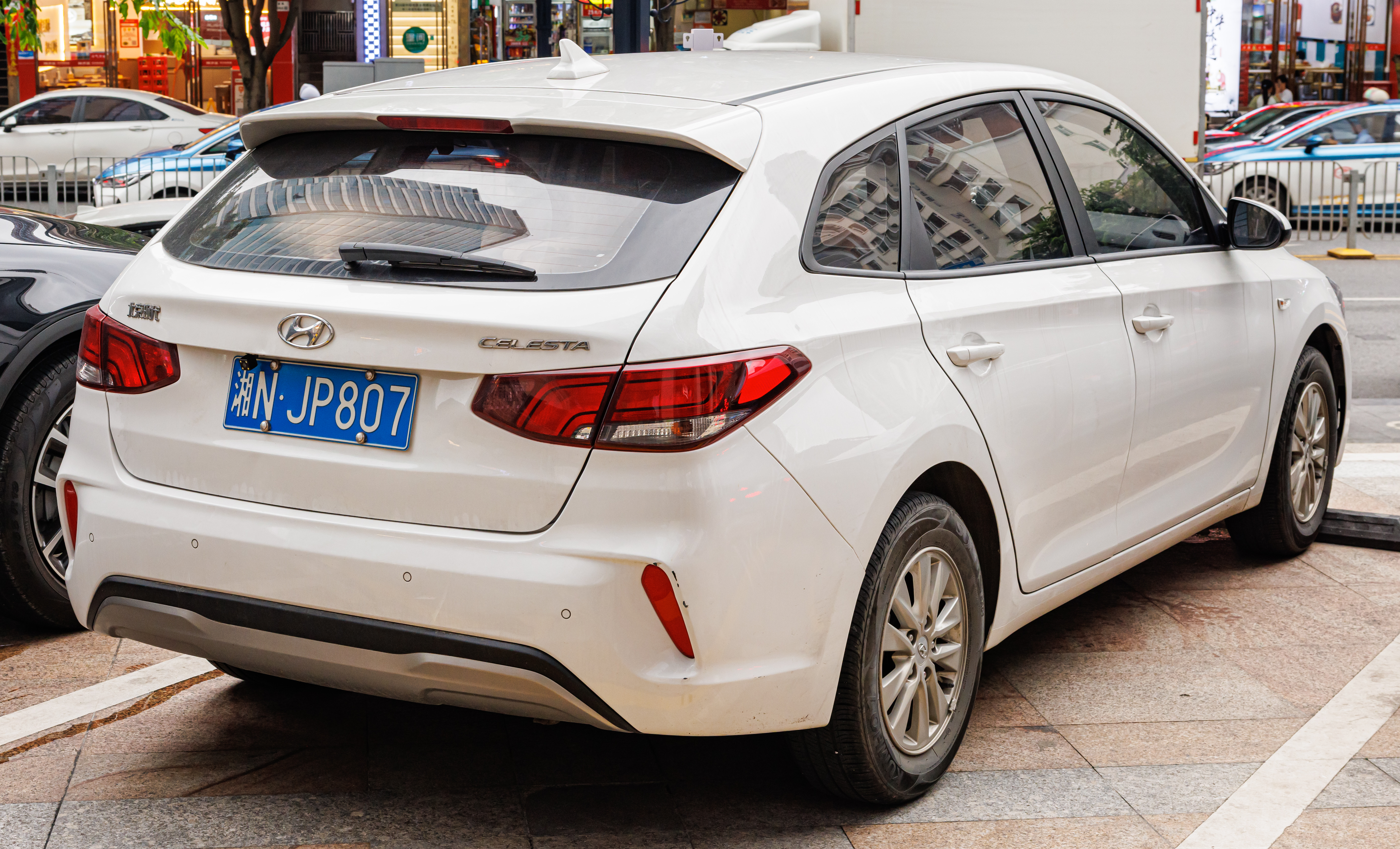
Hyundai Celesta RV rear

=== Powertrain ===
Model	Years	Transmission	Power	Torque	Top Speed
Celesta
1.6 Gamma MPi	2017–2023	6-speed manual 6-speed automatic	123 PS (121 hp; 90 kW) @ 6,300 rpm	15.4 kg⋅m (151 N⋅m; 111 lbf⋅ft) @ 4,850 rpm	188 km/h (117 mph) (manual); 190 km/h (118 mph) (automatic)
Celesta RV
1.4 Kappa II T-GDi	2018–2019	7-speed DCT	130 PS (128 hp; 96 kW) @ 6,000 rpm	21.6 kg⋅m (212 N⋅m; 156 lbf⋅ft) @ 1,400–3,700 rpm	
1.6 Gamma MPi	2018–2019	6-speed automatic	123 PS (121 hp; 90 kW) @ 6,300 rpm	15.4 kg⋅m (151 N⋅m; 111 lbf⋅ft) @ 4,850 rpm	
