= Reina =

Reina (the Spanish word for queen) or La Reina may refer to:

== Geography ==
- Reina, Badajoz, a municipality in the province of Badajoz, Extremadura, Spain
- Reina, Estonia, a village in Saaremaa Parish, Saare County, Estonia
- La Reina, a commune of Chile
- La Reina, Chalatenango, a municipality in El Salvador
- Pico La Reina, a mountain in Columbia

== People ==
- Reina (given name), a list of notable people with the given name
- Reina (surname), a list of notable people with the surname
- Reina (musician), American singer and songwriter Lori Reina Goldstein (born 1975)
- Alexia Putellas, Spanish footballer, nicknamed La Reina

== Arts and entertainment ==
- Reina (album), by the band Kinky
- Reina, a character in the Rave Master series
- Reina, a character in the Tekken video game series
- Reina, a character from the Hokuto no Ken franchise
- Reina Kousaka, a character in Hibike! Euphonium
- Reina Soho, a recurring character in Witchblade
- "La Reina" (song), a 2022 song by Christina Aguilera
- "La Reina", a 2026 song by U2 from Carnaval de Luz

== Other uses ==
- Hyundai Reina, a subcompact sedan manufactured in China by Hyundai
- Reina (nightclub), location of the January 1, 2017, Istanbul nightclub attack
- La Reina High School, a Catholic high school for girls in Los Angeles
- Reina, another name for the wine grape Mourvèdre
- La Reina (cattle), a Nicaraguan breed of cattle
- Reina Hispanoamericana, an annual beauty pageant
- Reina World Tag Team Championship, a Japanese wrestling championship

== See also ==
- Raina (disambiguation)
- Rena (disambiguation)
- Reyna (disambiguation)
