= Kia Pegas =

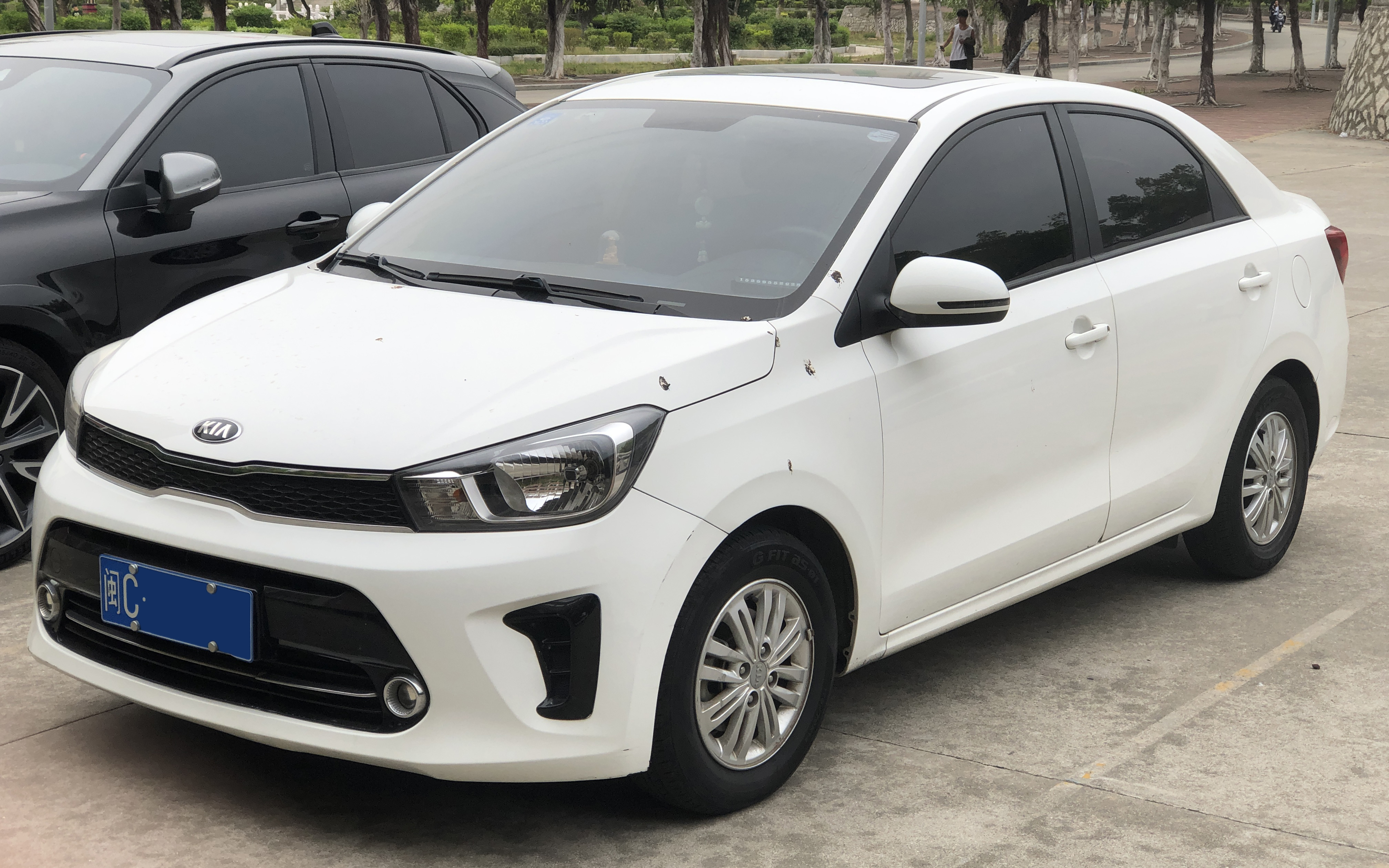

Overview
- Manufacturer: Kia Corporation
- Model code: AB
- Also called: Kia Soluto; Kia Sephia (taxi, Colombia)
- Production: 2017–present
- Model years: 2018–present
- Assembly: China: Yancheng, Jiangsu Yueda Kia; Ecuador: Quito (Aymesa); Vietnam: Chu Lai, Quảng Nam (THACO Kia)

Body and chassis
- Class: Subcompact car (B)
- Body style: 4-door sedan
- Layout: Front-engine, front-wheel-drive
- Platform: Hyundai-Kia PB
- Related: Kia K2/Rio (QB); Hyundai Reina

Powertrain
- Engine: Petrol: 1.4 L Kappa II MPI I4
- Transmission: 5-speed manual; 4-speed automatic

Dimensions
- Wheelbase: 2,570 mm (101.2 in)
- Length: 4,300 mm (169.3 in)
- Width: 1,700 mm (66.9 in)
- Height: 1,460 mm (57.5 in)

The Kia Pegas (Chinese: 起亚焕驰; pinyin: Qǐyà Huànchí) is an entry subcompact sedan (B-segment) manufactured in China by the Yueda Kia joint venture. It is sold under the Pegas nameplate in China, Africa and parts of the Middle East, and as the Kia Soluto in parts of Latin America and Southeast Asia.

== Overview ==
The Kia Pegas made its debut at the 2017 Auto Shanghai. Based on the PB platform used in the Kia K2 and targeted at young buyers, the Pegas stands on a 2,570 mm (101.2 in) wheelbase and has a trunk capacity of 475 liters. Powering the car is a 1.4 liter Kappa MPI I4 engine that generates 94 horsepower and 95 lb-ft torque to the front wheels.

The Kia Pegas/Soluto did not receive a facelift and end of production schedule.

The Kia Pegas/Soluto was heavily inspired by third-generation Kia Picanto bumper and fourth-generation Kia Rio-shaped headlights.

The Pegas went on sale in August 2017 in China and in late 2018 in Egypt. It debuted in the Philippines on 30 January 2019 as the Kia Soluto, coinciding with Kia Motors Philippines' relaunch under Ayala Corporation ownership. The Soluto was released in Vietnam in September 2019. The Pegas/Soluto is also available in right-hand drive, which was released in Brunei on 18 September 2020 as the Soluto and in South Africa on 14 June 2021 as the Pegas.

== Safety ==
The African version of the Pegas received 2 stars for adults and 4 stars for toddlers from Global NCAP 2.0 in 2024 (based on Latin NCAP 2016).

Global NCAP 2.0 test results (South Africa) Kia Pegas – 2 Airbags (2024, similar to Latin NCAP 2016)
Test	Score	Stars
Adult occupant protection	21.69/34.00	2 /5 stars
Child occupant protection	38.00/49.00	4 /5 stars

== Gallery ==
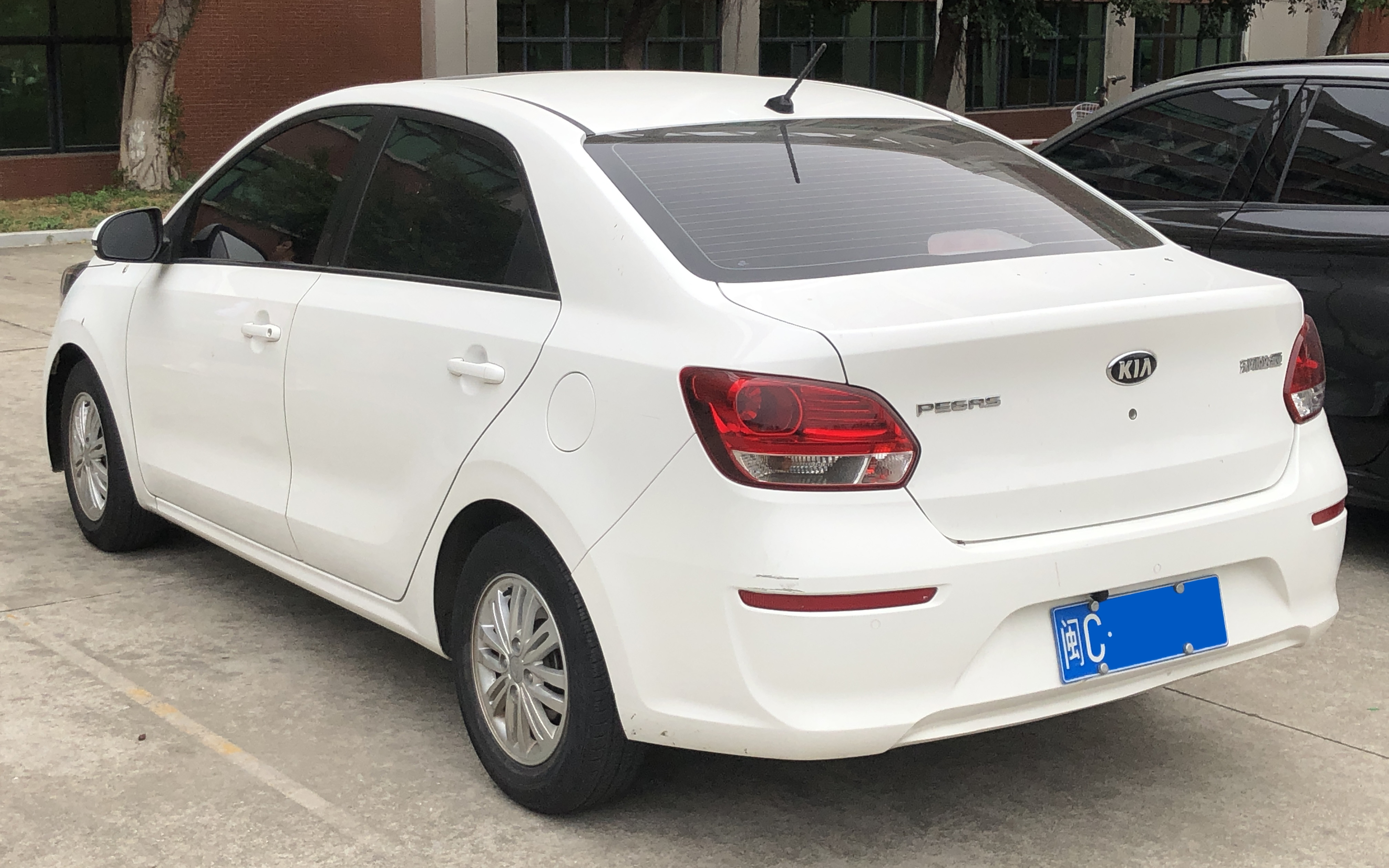
Rear view

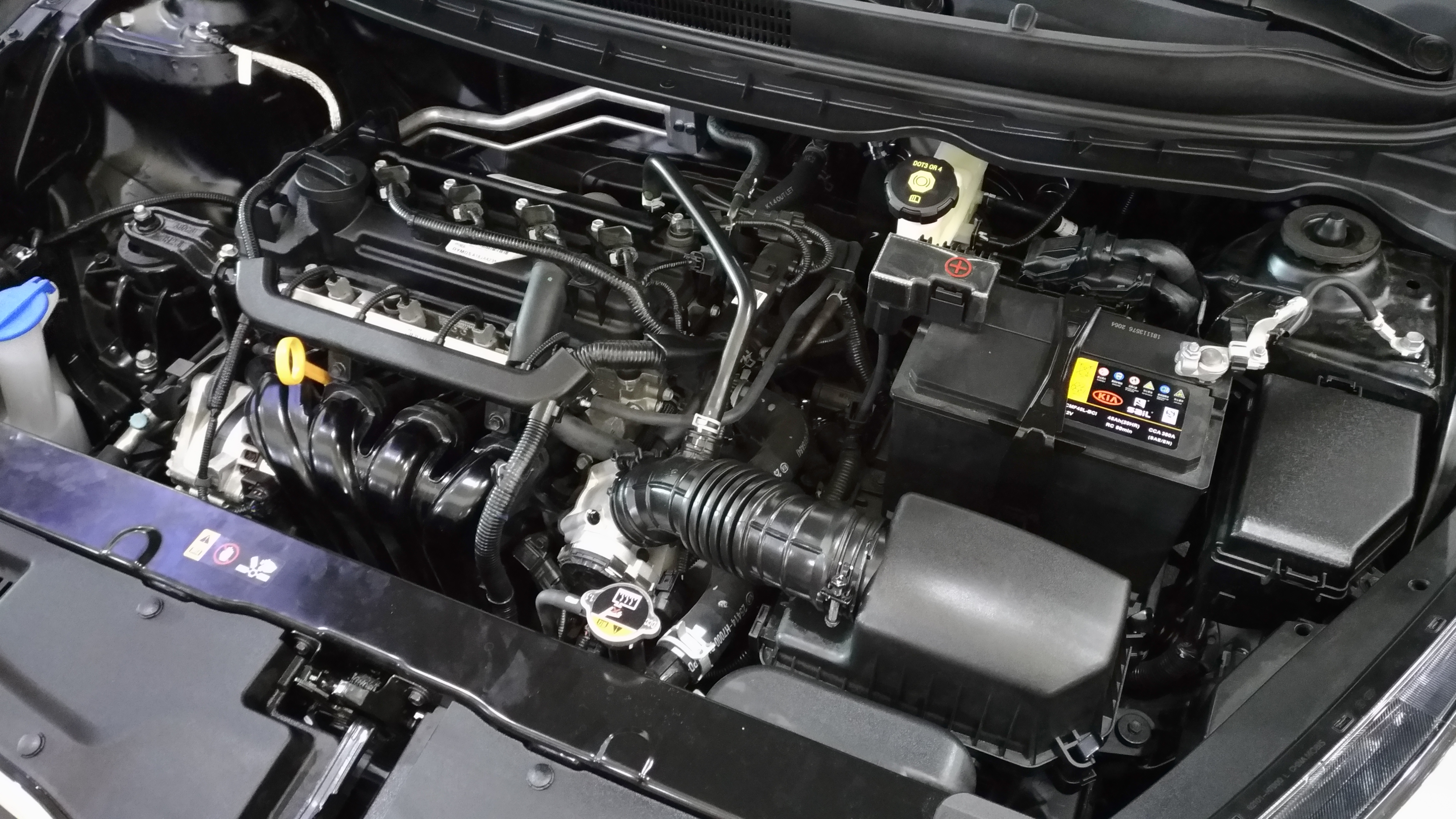
1.4 L Kappa II engine

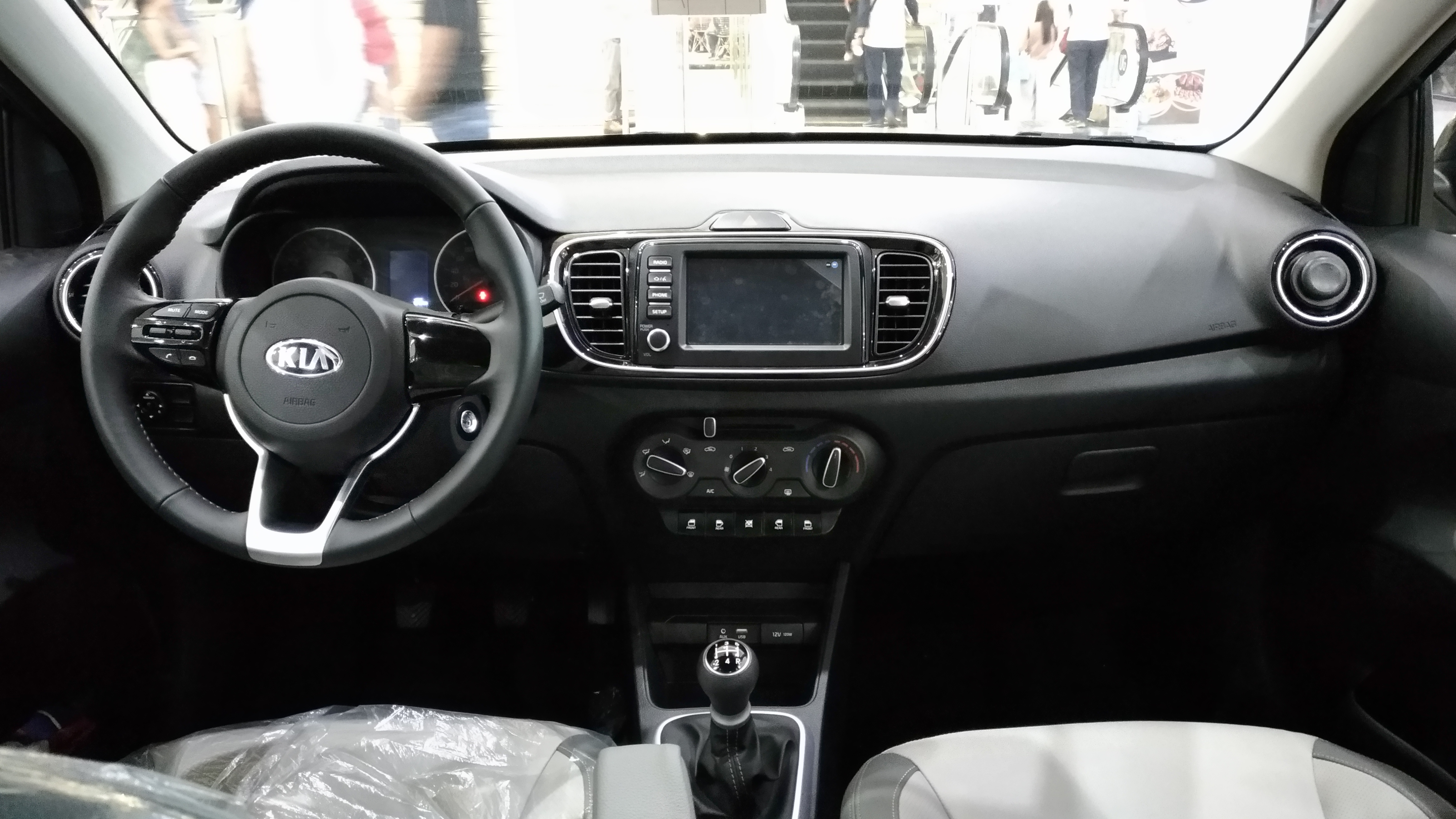
Interior (Philippines)

== Sales ==
Year	China
2023	1,179
2024	404
2025	203
