= The Littlest Orgasm =

Studio album by How to Swim
- Released: 2006
- Genres: Indie rock, alternative rock, pop
- Label: Electric Honey (2006)
- Producer: Gavin Thomson

How to Swim chronology
It Stings When I EP (2004)	The Littlest Orgasm (2006)	A Little Orgasm of Disappointment (2008)

The Littlest Orgasm is a six-track mini-album by Scottish indie rock band How to Swim. A reduced version of a planned longer album (to be titled A Little Orgasm of Disappointment), the mini-album was distributed by Stow College’s Electric Honey label and released in the Summer of 2006.

The record was recorded by Gavin Thomson at Berkeley 2 in Glasgow during September 2005 with additional overdubs added in the following months.

A music video was produced for the track "When The Rain Comes" by BAFTA-winning filmmaker Jamie Stone.

An excerpt from the track "A Little Orgasm of Disappointment" was used as the soundtrack to one of the five finalist entries to Doritos' 2009 Made to Share competition in the UK.

== Track listing ==
1. "A Little Orgasm of Disappointment" – 4:01
2. "This Is The Way (It Was Meant to Feel)" – 2:45
3. "When The Rain Comes" – 3:36
4. "Liquorice Kiss" – 3:26
5. "Pak Choi" – 3:52
6. "Cherry Moon" – 6:26
