= Hyundai Kappa engine =

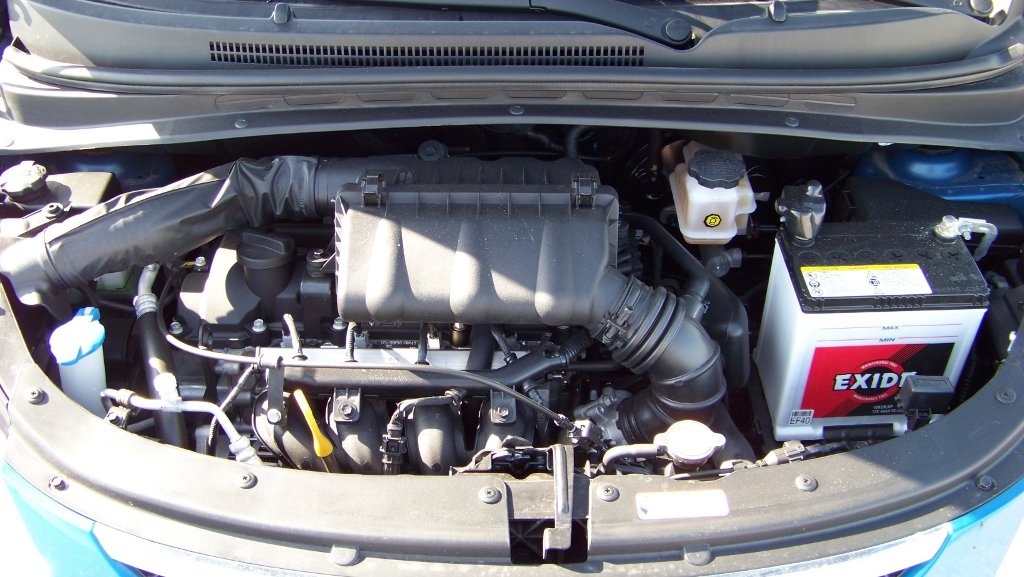
- 2009 Hyundai i10 1.25-litre Kappa engine

Overview
- Manufacturer: Hyundai Motor Company
- Production: 2008–present

Layout
- Configuration: Inline-three; Inline-four
- Displacement: 1.0 L (999 cc); 1.2 L (1,197 cc); 1.25 L (1,248 cc); 1.4 L (1,353 cc); 1.4 L (1,368 cc); 1.4 L (1,397 cc); 1.6 L (1,579 cc)
- Cylinder bore: 71 mm (2.8 in); 72 mm (2.83 in)
- Piston stroke: 75.6 mm (2.98 in); 78.8 mm (3.10 in); 84 mm (3.31 in); 97 mm (3.82 in)
- Cylinder block material: Aluminium
- Cylinder head material: Aluminium
- Valvetrain: DOHC 4 valves/cyl with VVT

Combustion
- Fuel system: Multipoint injection Direct injection
- Fuel type: Gasoline; LPG
- Cooling system: Water-cooled

Output
- Power output: 69–140 PS (51–103 kW; 68–138 hp)
- Torque output: 9.6–24.7 kg⋅m (94–242 N⋅m; 69–179 lbf⋅ft)

Dimensions
- Dry weight: 71.4–84 kg (157–185 lb)

Chronology
- Predecessor: Epsilon
- Successor: Smartstream G1.0T/G1.2/G1.4T/G1.5/G1.6HEV

Hyundai's Kappa automobile engine series consists of three-cylinder and four-cylinder models.

== Kappa ==
The Kappa engine series are gasoline powered, all-aluminum block and utilizes a 16-valve design with DOHC as opposed to the 12-valve design SOHC of its Epsilon engine family predecessor.

=== 1.25 L (G4LA) ===
The 1,248 cc (1.25 L) makes 77–78 PS (57–57 kW; 76–77 hp) at 6,000 rpm and 11.8–12.1 kg⋅m (85–88 lb⋅ft; 116–119 N⋅m) of torque at 4,000 rpm. Engine output figures varies depending on application and target market. Fuel economy is rated at 5 L/100 km (47 mpg_{‑US}; 56 mpg_{‑imp}) in the European combined test cycle.

Applications

- Hyundai i10 (PA) (2008–2013)
- Hyundai i20 (PB) (2008–2014)
- Kia Picanto/Morning (SA) (2008–2011)

=== 1.4 L ===
The 1,353 cc (1.4 L) version makes 95 PS (70 kW; 94 hp) at 6,000 rpm and 13.2 kg⋅m (95 lb⋅ft; 129 N⋅m) of torque at 4,000 rpm.

== Kappa II MPi ==
Main improvement is adding VVT (variable valve timing) to the engine.

=== 1.0 L MPI (G3LA) ===
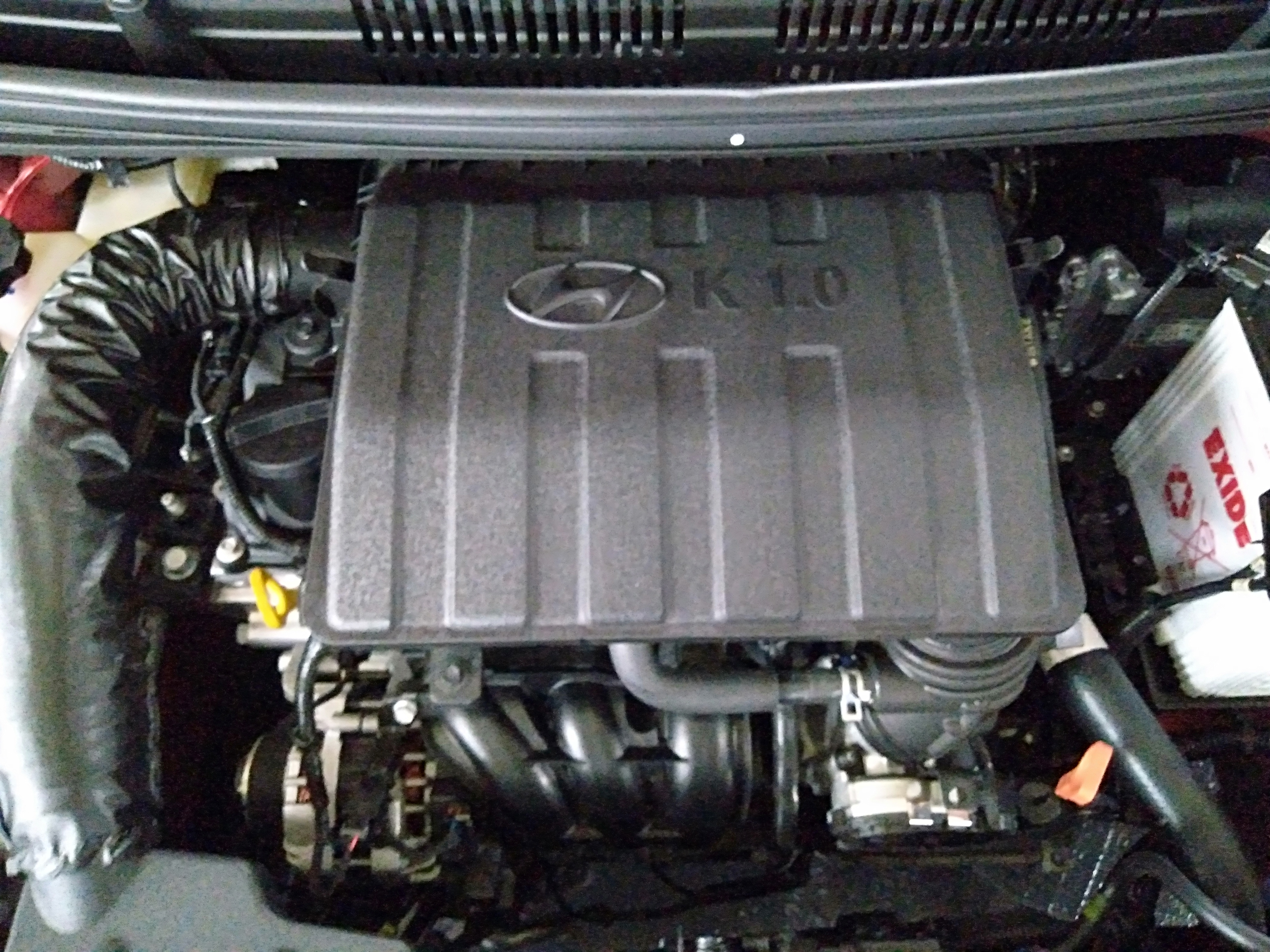
2021 Hyundai Grand i10 Nios 1.0 engine

The 998 cc (1.0 L) three-cylinder engine makes 69 PS (51 kW; 68 hp) at 6,200 rpm and 9.7 kg⋅m (70 lb⋅ft; 95 N⋅m) of torque at 3,500 rpm.

Applications

- Hyundai Eon (HA) (2011–2019)
- Hyundai Grand i10 (BA) (2013–2022)
- Hyundai Grand i10 (AI3) (2019–present)
- Hyundai HB20 (HB) (2012–2019)
- Hyundai i10 (PA) (2010–2013)
- Hyundai i10 (IA) (2013–2019)
- Hyundai i10 (AC3) (2019–present)
- Kia Picanto/Morning (TA) (2011–2017)
- Kia Picanto/Morning (JA) (2017–present)
- Kia Ray (TAM) (2011–present)

=== 1.0 L FLEX (F3LA) ===
Flex fuel compatible version of the 1.0 MPi engine. The 998 cc (1.0 L) three-cylinder engine makes 80 PS (59 kW; 79 hp) at 6,200 rpm and 10.2 kg⋅m (74 lb⋅ft; 100 N⋅m) of torque at 4,500 rpm.

Applications

- Hyundai HB20 (BR2) (2019–present)
- Kia Picanto/Morning (JA) (2018–2019)

=== 1.0 L TCI/T-MPi (G3LB) ===
The 998 cc (1.0 L) three-cylinder engine is turbocharged and makes 106 PS (78 kW; 105 hp) at 6,000 rpm and 14 kg⋅m (101 lb⋅ft; 137 N⋅m) of torque between 1,600 and 3,500 rpm.

Applications

- Kia Picanto/Morning (TA) (2015–2017)
- Kia Ray (TAM) (2012–2017)

=== 1.0 L Turbo FLEX (F3LB) ===
Flex fuel compatible version of the 1.0 TCi engine. The 998 cc (1.0 L) three-cylinder engine is turbocharged and makes 106 PS (78 kW; 105 hp) at 6,000 rpm and 14 kg⋅m (101 lb⋅ft; 137 N⋅m) of torque between 1,600 and 3,500 rpm.

Applications

- Hyundai HB20

=== 1.2 L (G4LB) ===
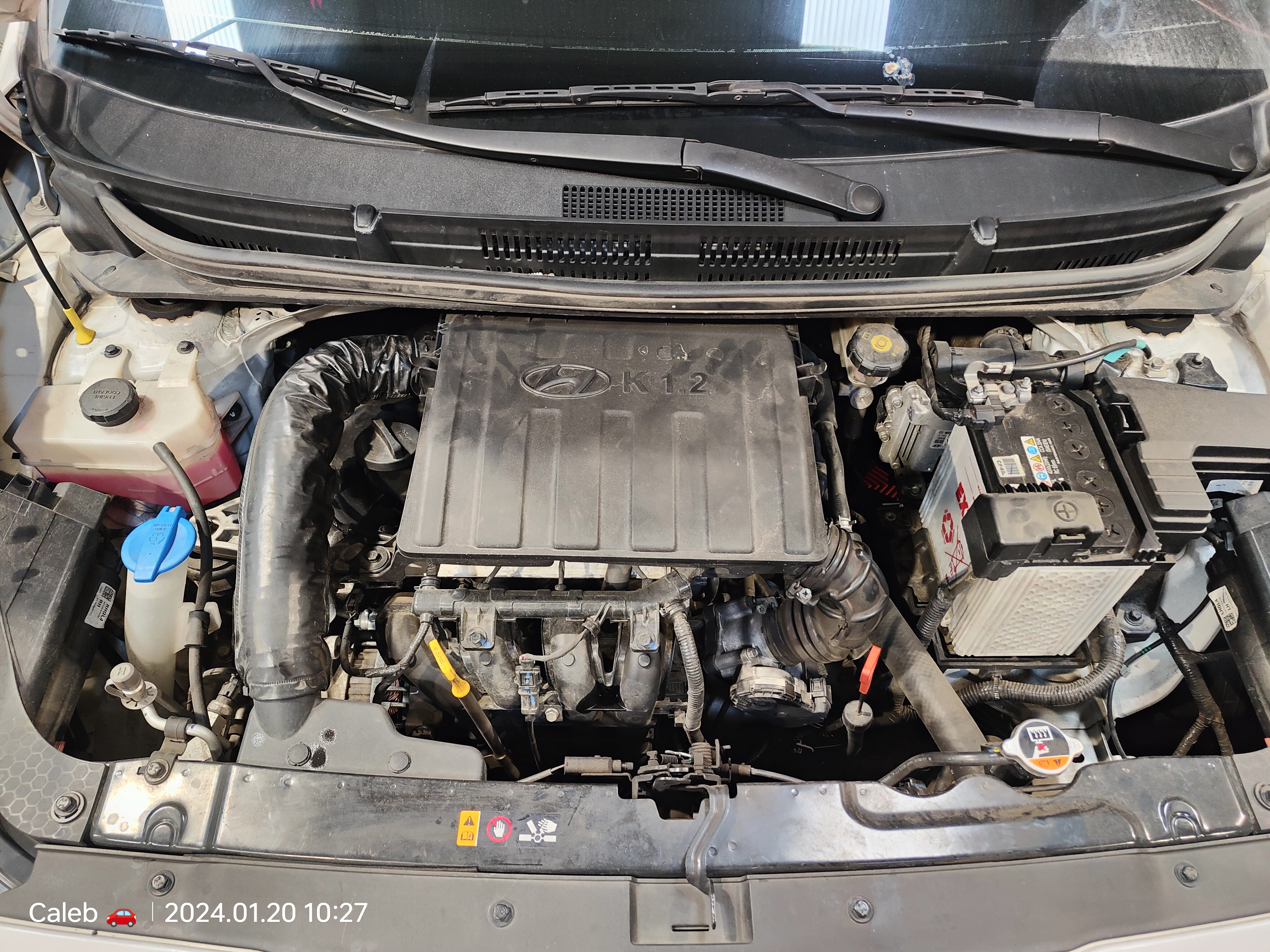
Hyundai Grand i10 sedan 1.2 engine

The 1,197 cc (1.2 L) is a destroked variant of the Kappa II G4LA engine produced in India to circumvent the 1,200 cc tax bracket. It is a four-cylinder engine making 83 PS (82 hp; 61 kW) at 6,000 rpm and 11.6–12 kg⋅m (84–87 lb⋅ft; 114–118 N⋅m) of torque at 4,200 rpm.

Applications

- Hyundai Aura (AI3) (2020–present)
- Hyundai Grand i10 (BA) (2013–2022)
- Hyundai Grand i10 (AI3) (2019–present)
- Hyundai i10 (PA) (2010–2016)
- Hyundai i10 (AC3) (2019–present)
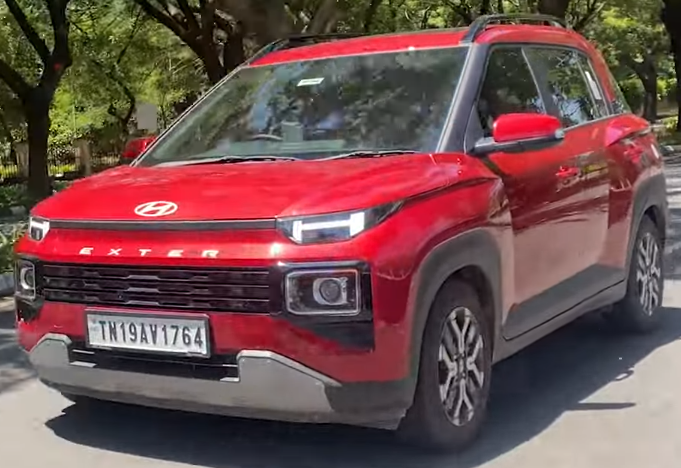
  Hyundai Exter Kappa 1.2L
- Hyundai i20 (PB) (2012–2015)
- Hyundai i20 (IB) (2014–2020)
- Hyundai i20 (BI3) (2020–present)
- Hyundai Venue (QXi) 1st Gen (2019–2023)
- Hyundai Venue (QXi) 1st Gen Facelift (2023–2025)
- Hyundai Venue (QU2) (2025–Present)
- Hyundai Xcent (BA) (2014–2020)
- Hyundai Exter (2023–present)

=== 1.25 L (G4LA) ===
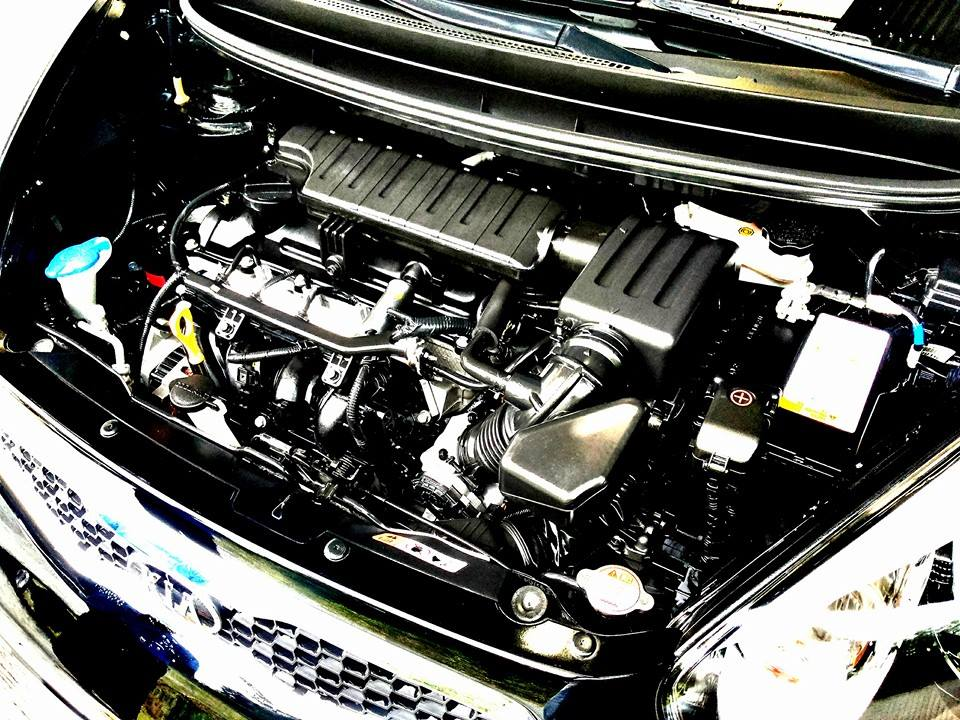
2012 Kia Picanto 1.25-litre Kappa II engine

The 1,248 cc (1.25 L) is the European version. It is a four-cylinder engine making 87 PS (64 kW; 86 hp) at 6,000 rpm and 12.3 kg⋅m (89 lb⋅ft; 121 N⋅m) of torque at 4,000 rpm.

Applications

- Hyundai i10 (PA) facelift (2010–2014)
- Hyundai i10 (IA) (2013–2019)
- Hyundai i20 (GB) (2014–2020)
- Kia Picanto (TA) (2011–2017)
- Kia Picanto (JA) (2017–present)
- Kia Rio (UB) (2011–2017)
- Kia Rio (YB) (2017–2023)
- Kia Stonic (YB) (2017–present)

=== 1.4 L (G4LC) ===
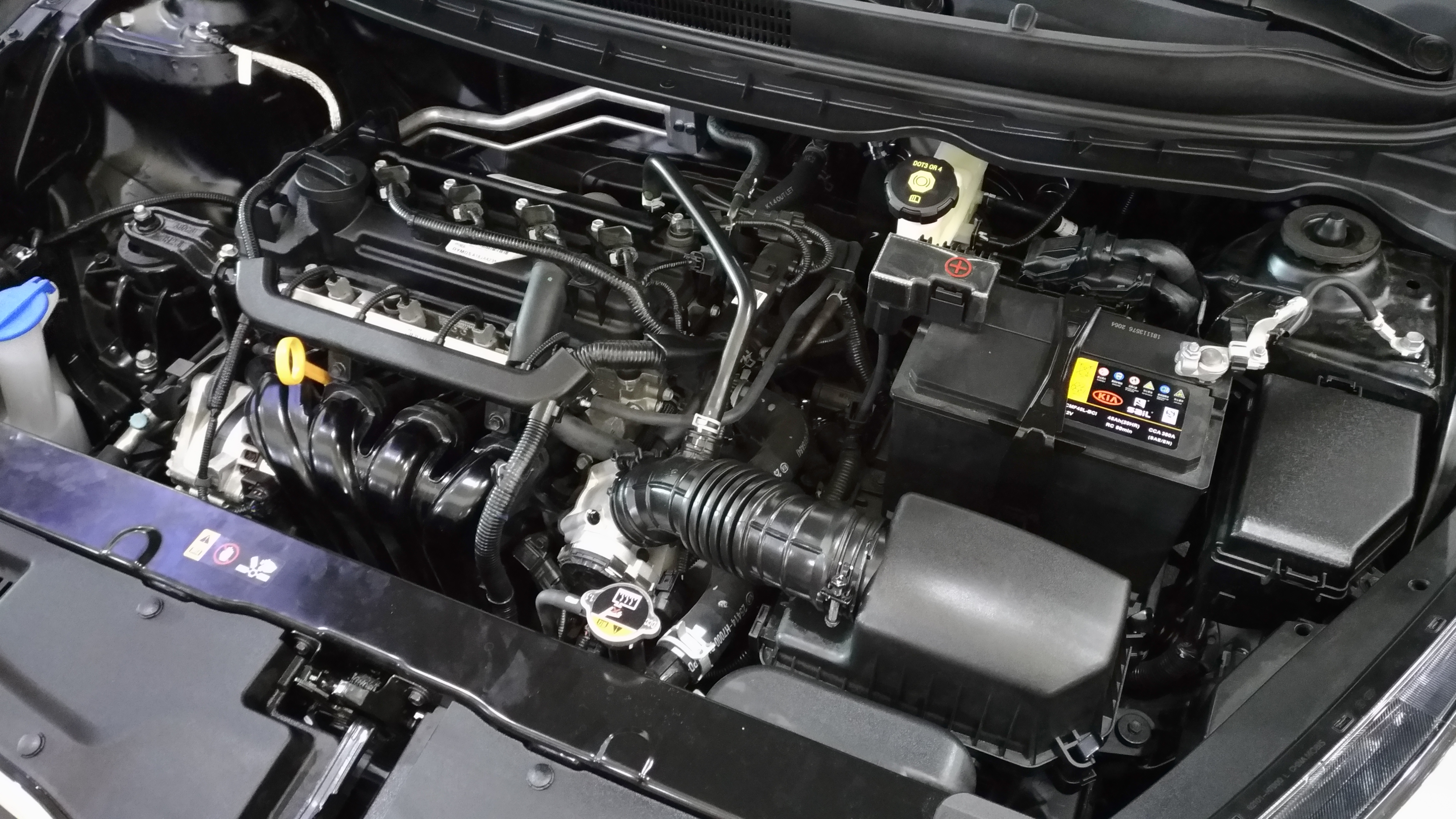
2019 Kia Soluto 1.4-litre Kappa II engine

The 1,368 cc (1.4 L) version adds Dual-CVVT and VIS, the engine makes 95–100 PS (70–74 kW; 94–99 hp) at 6,000 rpm and 13.5–13.7 kg⋅m (98–99 lb⋅ft; 132–134 N⋅m) of torque at 4,000 rpm.

Applications

- Hyundai Accent/Verna/Solaris (RB/RC) (2011–2017)
- Hyundai Accent/Verna/Solaris (HC/YC) (2017–2023)
- Hyundai Bayon (BC3 CUV) (2021–present)
- Hyundai Celesta (ID) (2017–2023)
- Hyundai i20 (GB) (2014–2020)
- Hyundai i20 (BI3) (2020–present)
- Hyundai i30 (PD) (2016–present)
- Hyundai Reina (CB) (2017–2021)
- Kia Pegas/Soluto (AB) (2017–present)
- Kia Rio/K2 (UB) (2011–2017)
- Kia Rio/K2/KX Cross (FB) (2017–2022)
- Kia K3 (BL7) (2024)–present
- Kia Stonic/KX1 (YB CUV) (2017–present)

== Kappa II GDi ==
=== 1.0 T-GDi (G3LC) ===
The 998 cc (1.0 L) turbocharged three-cylinder engine makes 120 PS (118 hp; 88 kW) at 6,000 rpm and 17.5 kg⋅m (127 lb⋅ft; 172 N⋅m) of torque between 1,500 and 4,000 rpm.

A detuned version that makes 100 PS (99 hp; 74 kW) between 4,500 and 6,000 rpm is also available for some applications.

Applications

- Hyundai Accent/Verna (HCi) (2020–2023)
- Hyundai Aura (AI3) (2020–present, detuned)
- Hyundai Casper (AX1) (2021–present, detuned)
- Hyundai Grand i10 (AI3) (2019–present, detuned)
- Hyundai HB20 (BR2) (2019–present)
- Hyundai i10 (AC3) (2019–present, detuned)
- Hyundai i20 (GB) (2014–2020)
- Hyundai i20 (BI3) (2020–present)
- Hyundai i30 (PD) (2016–present)
- Hyundai Kona (OS) (2017–2020)
- Hyundai Venue (QXi) (2019–present)
- Kia cee'd (JD) (2012–2018)
- Kia Ceed (CD) (2018–present)
- Kia Picanto (JA) (2017–present, detuned)
- Kia Rio (YB) (2017–2023)
- Kia Sonet (QY) (2020–present)
- Kia Stonic (YB) (2017–present)

=== 1.0 T-GDi FLEX (F3LC) ===
Flex fuel compatible version of the 1.0 T-GDi engine. The 998 cc (1.0 L) turbocharged three-cylinder engine makes 120 PS (118 hp; 88 kW) at 6,000 rpm and 17.5 kg⋅m (127 lb⋅ft; 172 N⋅m) of torque between 1,500 and 4,000 rpm.

Applications

- Hyundai Creta (SU2) (2021–present)
- Hyundai HB20 (BR2) (2019–present)

=== 1.4 T-GDi (G4LD) ===
The 1,353 cc (1.4 L) turbocharged four-cylinder engine which was announced in 2015 makes 140 PS (138 hp; 103 kW) at 6,000 rpm and 24.7 kg⋅m (242 N⋅m; 179 lbf⋅ft) of torque between 1,500 and 3,200 rpm.

A detuned version which produces 130 PS (128 hp; 96 kW) at 5,500 rpm and 21.6 kg⋅m (212 N⋅m; 156 lbf⋅ft) of torque between 1,400 rpm and 3,700 rpm is also available for some applications.

Applications

- Hyundai Celesta RV (ID) (2018–2019, detuned)
- Hyundai Creta (SU2) (2020–2023)
- Hyundai Elantra (AD) (2016–2020, detuned)
- Hyundai i30 (PD) (2016–present)
- Hyundai Lafesta (SQ) (2018–2020)
- Hyundai Veloster (JS) (2018–2020)
- Kia Ceed (CD) (2018–present)
- Kia K3 (BD) (2018–present)

== Kappa II GDi HEV ==
Announced in 2016 and intended for use in Hybrid applications, main improvements are utilizing Atkinson cycle, higher compression ratio, cooler EGR system and higher pressure fuel system.

=== 1.6 L (G4LE) ===
The 1,580 cc (1.6 L) four-cylinder with a 72 mm (2.8 in) bore, 97 mm (3.8 in) stroke and a 13.0:1 compression ratio. The engine makes 105 PS (104 hp; 77 kW) at 5,700 rpm and 15 kg⋅m (147 N⋅m; 108 lbf⋅ft) of torque at 4,000 rpm.

The Hybrid version combines a 1.56 KWh battery with an electric motor making 44 PS (43 hp; 32 kW) between 1,800 and 2,500 rpm with 17.3 kg⋅m (170 N⋅m; 125 lbf⋅ft) of torque between 0 and 1,800 rpm.

The Plug-in Hybrid version combines a 8.9 KWh battery with an electric motor making 60.5 PS (60 hp; 44 kW) between 1,800 and 2,500 rpm with 17.3 kg⋅m (170 N⋅m; 125 lbf⋅ft) of torque between 0 and 1,800 rpm.

Both the Hybrid and Plug-in Hybrid versions total combined system power is 141 PS (139 hp; 104 kW) at 5,700 rpm with 27 kg⋅m (265 N⋅m; 195 lbf⋅ft) of torque at 4,000 rpm.

Applications

- Hyundai Ioniq (2016–2022)
- Hyundai Kona Hybrid (OS) (2019–2020)
- Kia Niro (2016–present)

== Kappa II LPi ==
For use in LPG applications.

=== 1.0 L Bi-fuel (B3LA) ===
The 998 cc (1.0 L) three-cylinder. The engine makes 78–82 PS (77–81 hp; 57–60 kW) at 6,200 rpm and 9.6 kg⋅m (94 N⋅m; 69 lbf⋅ft) of torque at 3,500 rpm.

Applications

- Kia Morning (2011–2017)
- Kia Ray (2011–2017)

=== 1.0 L LPG (L3LA) ===
The 998 cc (1.0 L) three-cylinder. The engine makes 74 PS (73 hp; 54 kW) at 6,200 rpm and 9.6 kg⋅m (94 N⋅m; 69 lbf⋅ft) of torque at 3,500 rpm.

Applications

- Kia Morning (2017–2020)
- Kia Ray (2017–2019)

== Development ==
Developed at a cost of $421 million over a period of 48 months, the Kappa project was aimed at increasing fuel economy while ensuring compliance to stringent EURO-4 emission regulations. The newest versions of Kappa engine family comply with Euro-6DTemp regulations.

== Design ==
The engine block is made from high pressure die-cast aluminum which results in considerable weight savings - the entire engine with a manual gearbox only weighs 82.4 kg (182 lb). The main block features a ladder frame construction for structural stiffness while its cylinders are fitted with cast-iron liners for improved abrasion durability. Additional weight was shaved off by integrating the engine support bracket with the timing chain cover. The shape of the piston skirt was optimized to reduce its size while the compression height of the piston was also reduced, resulting in weight savings. The optimized piston skirt is also treated with molybdenum disulfide. A highly sophisticated process of Physical Vapor Deposition (PVD) is used to apply an ultra-thin layer of Chromium nitride to the piston’s oil ring. Chromium Nitride-coated piston rings using PVD is an innovative technology borrowed from the Hyundai Tau engine introduced earlier. Friction between the oil ring and cylinder wall has been further minimized by reducing the oil ring tension. The Kappa engine is the first Hyundai engine to be fitted with an accessory drive belt which does not require a mechanical auto-tensioning adjustment device, reducing the hardware and further lowering weight and cost. Because it is designed to maintain an ideal tension setting, the belt runs quieter and with proper preventative maintenance and care, the belt will last 100,000 mi (160,000 km). For ignition, the Kappa engine uses a new, longer reach spark plug which enabled engineers to enlarge the size of the water jacket to promote more efficient engine cooling around the critically important spark plug and exhaust port area. The long reach spark plug (M12 thread) also enabled engineers to enlarge the valve diameter for increased airflow and combustion efficiency. A lightweight, heat-resistant engineering plastic was used for the intake manifold. The fuel delivery pipe assembly is a returnless type (to eliminate evaporative fuel emissions) and is made of SUS (steel use stainless) with a specially designed inner structure for the reduction of pulsation noise.

== Valvetrain ==
The valvetrain features a number of innovations: friction reducing roller swing arm, hydraulic lash adjusters which ensure proper clearances between the valve stem and roller swing arm, which significantly reduce valve tapping noise. The valve springs feature a beehive shape and smaller retainer. The reduced weight and spring load further help lower friction and improve fuel economy. The valvetrain is driven by a silent-type, maintenance free steel timing chain that replaces a roller-type timing chain: The optimized design greatly reduces impact forces and noise when the gear tooth and chain engage.

== Offset crank ==
Unlike a conventional engine where the centerline of the cylinder bore is in perfect vertical alignment with the rotating axis of the crankshaft, the Kappa’s centerline is offset by a small distance. This offset minimizes the lateral force created by the rotating piston & rod assembly (known, and audible, as "piston slap" at its extreme). The net effect is an improvement in fuel consumption and a reduction in noise, vibration and harshness - it should also help with engine longevity since reduced lateral force will equal reduced bore wear.

== Engine management ==
Engine management is provided by two 16-bit 32 MHz microprocessors which control and monitor ignition timing, idle speed, knocking and emissions.

== See also ==
- List of Hyundai engines
