= How to Swim (band) =

Scottish pop/rock band

- Origin: Glasgow, Scotland, United Kingdom
- Genres: indie rock, pop, avant rock, alternative rock, art rock, baroque pop
- Years active: 2000–present
- Labels: Electric Honey, Personal Hygiene
- Members: Gregor Barclay (guitar, vocals); Brent McCammond (guitar); Patsy Craig (synths, cello); Noah Scott (keys); Dave Gillies (bass); Chris Brown (drums); Alexander Lambton (saxophone)
- Past members: Daniel Drever; Ian Cronan; Nicola West; Paul Kelly; Anna Webster; Heather North; Peter Vallely; Richard Merchant; Martin Docherty; Romano Valerio; Ross McCrae; Jamie Watson; Annie MacFarlane; Colin Dolan; Sean Callaghan; Bob Rafferty; Nick Rafferty; Jim McAteer; Tang Chi Meng; Patrick Johnson; Anissia Kerr; Jenny Wan; Euan Allardice; Fiona Burns; Mhairi Ross; Mark Chapman; Benedict Radcliffe; Victoria Firth; Michael Bates; Alistair Johnson; Hannah Rankine; Elaine Sexton; Ellen Macdonald; Philip Gurrey
- Website: howtoswim.bandcamp.com

How to Swim are a pop/rock band from Glasgow, Scotland. The core group currently consists of Gregor Barclay (lead vocals, guitars), Brent McCammond (guitars), Patsy Craig (synths, cello, vocals), Dave Gillies (bass, vocals), Noah Scott (keyboards), Alexander Lambton (saxophone) and Chris Brown (drums). Barclay, also the band's leader and songwriter, has been the only consistent member since formation in 2000. Band historian Brown rejoined the live lineup in 2024 having previously taken the drumstool throughout the 2000s.

== History ==
=== Formation and early years (2000–2003) ===
How to Swim were formed at Glasgow School of Art in late 2000 by Gregor Barclay (vocals and guitar), then a 1st year architecture student. The band began as a six piece, comprising Barclay and fellow undergraduates: bassist Tang Chi Meng, percussionist Michael Bates, drummer Benedict Radcliffe, guitarist Mark Chapman and multi-instrumentalist Anna Webster. This line-up would last for only one performance, with Radcliffe departing, replaced by Bob Rafferty. Initial influences included Bob Dylan, The Velvet Underground and Pavement. The band's line-up would continue to change many times over subsequent years, adapting influences and styles. Throughout, Barclay has remained the principal songwriter, the sole continuous member through the different incarnations of the band.

How to Swim performing in April 2007

In 2001, HTS released three home-recorded EPs, each on a very limited run. In the summer, the three CD-Rs were collected and released as The 3 EPs, the title a nod to The Beta Band's similarly titled 1998 release. The material from this period was recorded and performed by Barclay, with violinist Pauline McMullen and bassist Tang Chi Meng (by this point the only surviving member from the 'classic' line-up.) Around this time, the band played a number of gigs in Glasgow as a quartet with Rafferty on drums, occasionally augmented by Rafferty's elder brother Nick on lead guitar. In 2002, Tang departed the band to concentrate on his studies, and was replaced by Jim McAteer.

By 2003, with McMullen, McAteer and both Raffertys departed (the junior Rafferty would return to the drumstool for a brief period in 2010), the band used recording dates arranged at Glasgow's Stow College to embark upon producing a self-funded first album Start Life in 2D. The line-up now included bassist/trumpeter Martin Docherty, drummer Chris Brown and flautist Fiona Burns. Recordings made by the music production class formed a large portion of the album, along with tracks recorded at the SAE Institute, and two home recordings produced by Barclay's schoolfriend Mark Velarde.

The ten-track album was released in limited supply in August 2003, (following on from a limited-edition collection of live recordings and home demos entitled Gain Dimension) through the band's own 'Personal Hygiene' imprint, sold in local independent music stores and promoted with a number of live performances in and around Scotland.

The release found some limited radioplay; the band were interviewed on Jim Gellatly's Beatbreakers programme on the now-defunct XFM Scotland (then Beat 106).

=== It Stings When I EP and expansion (2003–2006) ===
Recordings for another self-funded record, It Stings When I EP, began in August 2004, the first HTS record to be produced by Gavin Thomson, then of local band 'Flying Matchstick Men', and latterly of Findo Gask. By this point, the band was a seven-piece, now including trumpet player Alastair Johnson and guitarist Sean Callaghan. More ambitious than previous recordings, the EP included a string quartet (arranged by Ross McCrae, then of The Poppadoms), brass, timpani and clarinet. For "Bones", over thirty people were squeezed inside Barclay's home to perform backing vocals.

The EP was launched in Glasgow in December 2004 with a free show at Glasgow's Oxfam Music store.

The record received a good response over the coming months, from publications including Is this music? and The List, with Channel 4's Teletext service Planet Sound making it their 'Demo of the Week', stating that "Of the released CDs we receive, 98% are nowhere near this imaginative."

Looking to both improve the band's compositional repertoire and perform the EP tracks live, additional players were brought in over this period. Adding keyboard player Jenny Wan (formerly of My Legendary Girlfriend), cellist Patrick Johnson, violinist Mhairi Ross, flautist Heather North (replacing a departing Fiona Burns) and Ross McCrae on trombone, the band played at King Tut's Wah Wah Hut in July 2005 for the first time as an eleven-piece; a line-up that would remain intact for another year.

In 2005, the band contributed to a covers album of proto-C86 group The June Brides, re-arranging and recording a version of the Brides' "On The Rocks". The record, entitled Still Unravished: A Tribute to The June Brides, also featured contributions from Manic Street Preachers and Television Personalities. It was released in 2006 on Yesboyicecream Records.

=== The Littlest Orgasm and Electric Honey (2006) ===
Planning a debut album, to be titled A Little Orgasm of Disappointment, the band began recording, again with Gav Thomson, at Berkeley 2, Glasgow, in September 2005. Shortly afterwards, time and money restrictions brought about the decision to release the record as a six-track mini-album, rather than the full 15 tracks planned. The 2009 release of A Little Orgasm of Disappointment is a compilation of The Littlest Orgasm and It Stings When I EP, and not to be mistaken for the abandoned full-length.

In October 2005, the band signed to Electric Honey; a music label run by the Students of Stow College's HNC Music Industry Management, famous for uncovering local acts such as Snow Patrol, Belle and Sebastian and Biffy Clyro. The deal would last until the end of the academic year, with the label agreeing to release and help promote The Littlest Orgasm.

A promotional single featuring "(I am a) Logical Man" and "Bones", released by Electric Honey would be released in 2006, gaining considerable radio airplay, including broadcasts on BBC Radio Scotland, Phill Jupitus' BBC6 Music show and BBC Radio 1 by DJ Rob da Bank.

In 2007, the band released a split 7-inch single with Edinburgh act Found through Creeping Bent. Later in 2007, Electric Honey chose How to Swim to represent them on Thank You For Being You; a record highlighting some of the best independent Scottish music releases of the previous 25 years. The release was met with positive reviews nationwide in publications such as Uncut and NME.

=== Retina and Little Rooms (2007–2014) ===
In May 2007, the band began recording Retina, the follow-up to The Littlest Orgasm, in Glasgow's Forth Street Studios, again with Gavin Thomson. Further recording sessions would take place in 'The Freezer' and in the band's rehearsal space. The album was mixed by James Neilson and mastered by Steven Ward, and released on 4 October 2010.

A career-spanning live album, "Little Room/s", was released in November 2011. The album was a collection of live recordings and unreleased tracks from the period 2004–2011.

In 2012 the band travelled to Zadar, Croatia, to record the city's famous sea organ for their next album, Niagarama. The instrument is featured on the opening track, "Niagara". The live sessions were recorded in Glasgow with Sam Smith at Green Door Studios, and the album was released in March 2014.

=== Fewer personnel and the Barcelona project (2013–2022) ===
In 2013 How to Swim was retooled as a five-piece, citing the technical difficulties of touring a larger outfit as the reason for their diminished numbers. Around this time a consistent lineup began to solidify, including Glasgow band regulars Paul Joseph Kelly (The Martial Arts, Carla J. Easton, BMX Bandits), Dave Gillies (Dirty Keys, Colin's Godson) and Ian Cronan (Mother and the Addicts). With the recruitment in 2014 of tenor saxophonist Alexander Lambton the band's lineup would finally settle as a six-piece, a configuration and company that would remain consistent for over ten years.

In May 2013, How to Swim released Midnight Steak, a six-track EP of new material recorded in Barcelona over a period of 72 hours. In May 2014, the band returned to Barcelona to record Dill Pickle, a further EP comprising five new tracks, this time recorded in 48 hours.

The band returned to Barcelona twice more in recent years: in 2022 to record and release Unseasoned Dirt on Loose Skull, the third 'Barcelona EP', and again the following year to record principal sessions for their forthcoming LP, Poundstore Diabolism.

In March 2024 the band released Bars 'n' Loners, a compilation album bringing together all three Barcelona EPs in one volume, completing the 'Barcelona project'.

=== Recent developments ===
Lineup changes occurred in early 2024 with the departure of Kelly, Cronan and longtime keyboardist Nicola West. Replacements came in the form of Glasgow musicians Daniel Drever, Chris Brown and Patsy Cramilton. Late that year the band became a seven-piece with the addition of BBC Radio Scotland Young Traditional Musician of the Year 2025 finalist Noah Scott on keyboards.

On Christmas Eve 2024 How To Swim debuted their visualized podcast series on YouTube, The Band That Time Forgot, hosted by Barclay and celebrating the band's 25-year history with appearances from current and former members.

On 21 February 2025 the band released Greek Active, an album recorded ten years previously and the first of several LPs slated for release throughout the year.

== Live ==
Over the years the band have shared bills with established acts including Sons and Daughters, Errors, HENGE, Loki, Dananananaykroyd, Gravenhurst, The Phantom Band, Broken Records, The Twilight Sad, The Low Miffs, Dawn of the Replicants, Misty's Big Adventure, Wild Beasts, Kimya Dawson, My Life Story, Amusement Parks on Fire, The Fire Engines, The Twistettes, The Bluebells and Trachtenburg Family Slideshow Players.

In 2006, the band took part in TBreak, an annual event sponsored by Tennents, giving bands the opportunity to appear at Scotland's T in the Park festival. The band were chosen to appear at one of several showcase events in May, viewed by a panel of judges. Ultimately, they were one of twelve acts selected, and performed at the festival on the Sunday evening.

Following the festival, How to Swim were then selected for the show 'Best of TBreak' as part of Edinburgh's The Edge Festival. The band played at The Liquid Rooms, along with 3-Style, The Acute and Found.

== Discography ==
=== Albums/EPs ===
Year	Album information	Chart positions	
Year	Album information	UK	UK Indie Chart
2001	The 3 EPs: Released: December 2001; Label: Personal Hygiene Recordings	n/a	n/a
2003	How To Swim Start Life in 2D: Released: 2003; Label: Personal Hygiene Recordings	n/a	n/a
2004	It Stings When I EP: Released: 2004; Label: Personal Hygiene Recordings	n/a	n/a
2006	The Littlest Orgasm: Released: 1 June 2006; Label: Electric Honey	n/a	n/a
2010	Retina (or More Fun Than a Vat of Love): Released: 4 October 2010; Label: Personal Hygiene Recordings	n/a	n/a
2013	Midnight Steak EP: Released: 1 June 2013; Label: Personal Hygiene Recordings	n/a	n/a
2014	Niagarama: Released: 24 March 2014; Label: Personal Hygiene Recordings	n/a	n/a
2014	Dill Pickle EP: Released: 26 May 2014; Label: Personal Hygiene Recordings	n/a	n/a
2022	Unseasoned Dirt on Loose Skull EP: Released: May 2022; Label: Personal Hygiene Recordings	n/a	n/a
2025	Greek Active: Released: 21 February 2025; Label: Personal Hygiene Recordings	n/a	n/a
2025	Poundstore Diabolism: Released: May 2025 (TBC); Label: Personal Hygiene Recordings	n/a	n/a

=== Compilations ===
Year	Album information	Chart positions	
Year	Album information	UK	UK Indie Chart
2009	A Little Orgasm of Disappointment: Compilation album; Released: 2009; Label: Personal Hygiene Recordings	n/a	n/a
2011	Little Room(s): Compilation album; Released: 2011; Label: Personal Hygiene Recordings	n/a	n/a
2024	Bars 'n' Loners: Compilation album; Released: 1 March 2024; Label: Personal Hygiene Recordings	n/a	n/a
