= Reyna =

Reyna may refer to:

- Rinə, a village in Azerbaijan
- Estadio Víctor Manuel Reyna, Mexican football stadium
- Spanish ship Reyna (1743), Spanish warship
- Reyna (musical group), a Milwaukee-based pop duo

== Given name ==
- Reyna Gallegos, Mexican wrestler
- Reyna Grande (born 1975), Mexican-American author
- Reyna Haydee Ramírez, Mexican journalist
- Reyna Thompson (born 1963), American football player

== Surname ==
- Agustín Zaragoza Reyna (born 1941), Mexican boxer
- Aida Reyna (born 1950), Peruvian volleyball player
- Ángel Reyna (born 1984), Mexican footballer
- Antonio Roldán Reyna (born 1946), Mexican boxer
- Art Reyna, American politician
- Carola Reyna (born 1962), Argentine actress
- Casiodoro de Reyna (c. 1520–1594), Spanish monk
- Claudio Reyna (born 1973), American soccer player
- Cornelio Reyna (1940–1997), Mexican singer
- Diana Reyna (born 1973), American politician
- Enric Reyna (1940–2026), Spanish football executive
- Francisco de Reyna, Spanish painter
- Fredy Reyna (1917–2001), Venezuelan musician
- Gio Reyna (born 2002), American soccer player
- Irving Reyna (born 1987), Honduran footballer
- Jimmie V. Reyna (born 1952), American judge
- Jorge Reyna (born 1963), Cuban triple jumper
- Leonel Antonio Fernández Reyna (born 1953), Dominican politician
- Luis Reyna (born 1959), Peruvian footballer
- Pedro Antonio Ríos Reyna (1905–1971), Venezuelan musician
- Valerie F. Reyna, American psychologist
- Yordy Reyna (born 1993), Peruvian footballer

== Fictional characters ==
- Reyna Ramírez-Arellano, a character in Percy Jackson & the Olympians, The Heroes of Olympus, and The Trials of Apollo
- Reyna, a character in the video game Valorant

== See also ==
- Reina (disambiguation)
- Rena (disambiguation)
