= Kia Ray =

City car produced by Kia

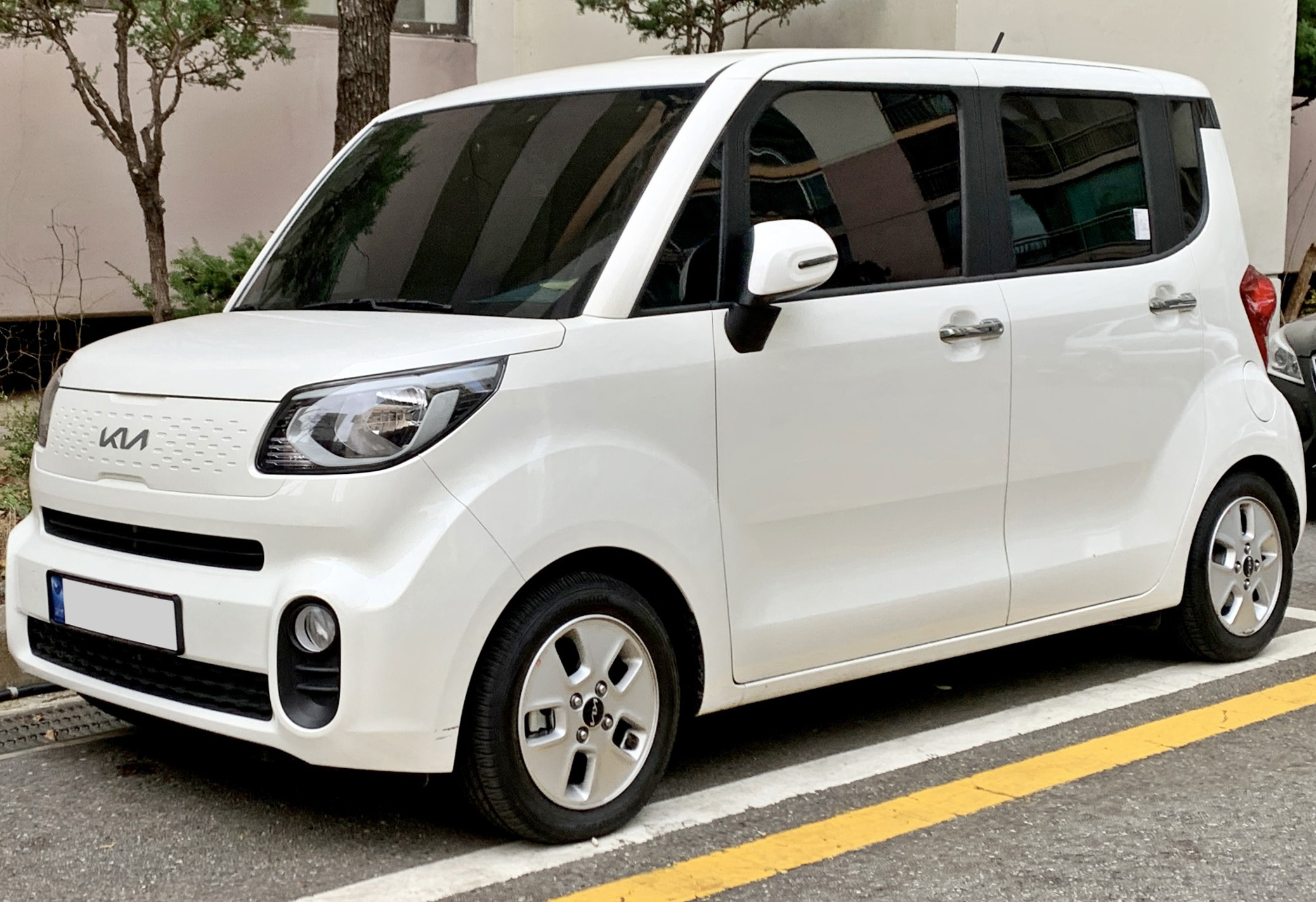

Overview
- Manufacturer: Kia Corporation
- Production: 2011–present
- Assembly: South Korea: Seosan Plant, Seosan (Donghee)

Body and chassis
- Class: Minivan city car (A)
- Body style: 5-door MPV
- Layout: Front-engine, front-wheel-drive
- Platform: Hyundai-Kia SA
- Related: Kia Picanto (TA)

Powertrain
- Engine: Petrol: 1.0 L Kappa II I3; 1.0 L Kappa II TCI I3; LPG: 1.0 L Kappa II I3; 1.0 L Kappa II I3
- Electric motor: 50 kW (68 PS; 67 hp) (16.4 kWh); 64 kW (87 PS; 86 hp) (35.2 kWh)
- Transmission: 4-speed A4CF0 automatic; CVT
- Battery: 16.4 kWh lithium ion battery 35.2 kWh LFP battery
- Range: 138 km (86 mi) (16.4 kWh); 205 km (127 mi) (35.2 kWh)

Dimensions
- Wheelbase: 2,520 mm (99.2 in)
- Length: 3,595 mm (141.5 in)
- Width: 1,595 mm (62.8 in)
- Height: 1,700–1,710 mm (66.9–67.3 in)
- Curb weight: 988–1,110 kg (2,178–2,447 lb); 1,290–1,295 kg (2,844–2,855 lb) (EV)

The Kia Ray (Korean: 기아 레이) is a city car manufactured by Kia exclusively for the South Korean domestic market. Based on the Kia Picanto/Morning, it was specifically developed in compliance with the "light car" (Korean: 경차, romanized: Gyeongcha) category that offers tax incentives for cars with exterior dimensions below 3,600 mm (141.7 in) in length and below 1,600 mm (63.0 in) in width. This is a Korean-only vehicle.

== Overview ==
Only available in the local Korean domestic market, the Kia Ray is equipped with a 998 cc gasoline engine which generates 78 PS (57 kW; 77 hp) at 6,400 rpm.

The Ray has a unique door layout; the passenger side of the vehicle has a sliding door for the rear seats, while the driver's side has a swing-out door. The car has a kei car-inspired boxy dimensions. The Ray's interior benefits from the square shape, as it has more space than most cars its size; however, it is only able to seat four people.

=== Kia Ray EV (2011) ===
The Kia Ray EV was launched in 2011 as Kia's first production battery electric vehicle. It is powered by a 50 kW (67 hp) electric motor, with a 330 V, 16.4 kWh lithium ion battery that allows an all-electric range of 139 km (86 mi) depending on driving conditions. The traction motor has a rated torque output of 167 N⋅m (123 lbf⋅ft).

Despite a curb weight of 1,185 kg (2,612 lb), an increase of 187 kg (412 lb) compared to the conventionally-powered model, the Kia Ray EV was claimed to accelerate from 0–100 km/h (0–62 mph) in 15.9 seconds and achieved a top speed of 130 km/h (81 mph). Charging times ranged from 6 hours (using a 220 V AC household supply) to 25 minutes (using a DC fast charge station). The AC charging port is in the front grille, while the DC charging port is where the fuel filler door is on the conventional model.

The initial roll out was limited to a production run of 2,500 vehicles destined for the South Korean government fleets, and scheduled to be deployed in 2012. In May 2013 a fleet of 184 Kia Ray EVs were deployed in Seoul as part of a carsharing service called "Electric Vehicle Sharing” at a rate of US$5 per hour. The service had 15,000 registered customers by May 2013.

Production of the Kia Ray EV ended in 2018. An updated Kia Ray EV was announced in August 2023 and launched on September 21, 2023; the updated vehicle features a bigger 35.2 kWh LFP battery and more powerful 64 kW (87 PS; 86 hp) electric motor.

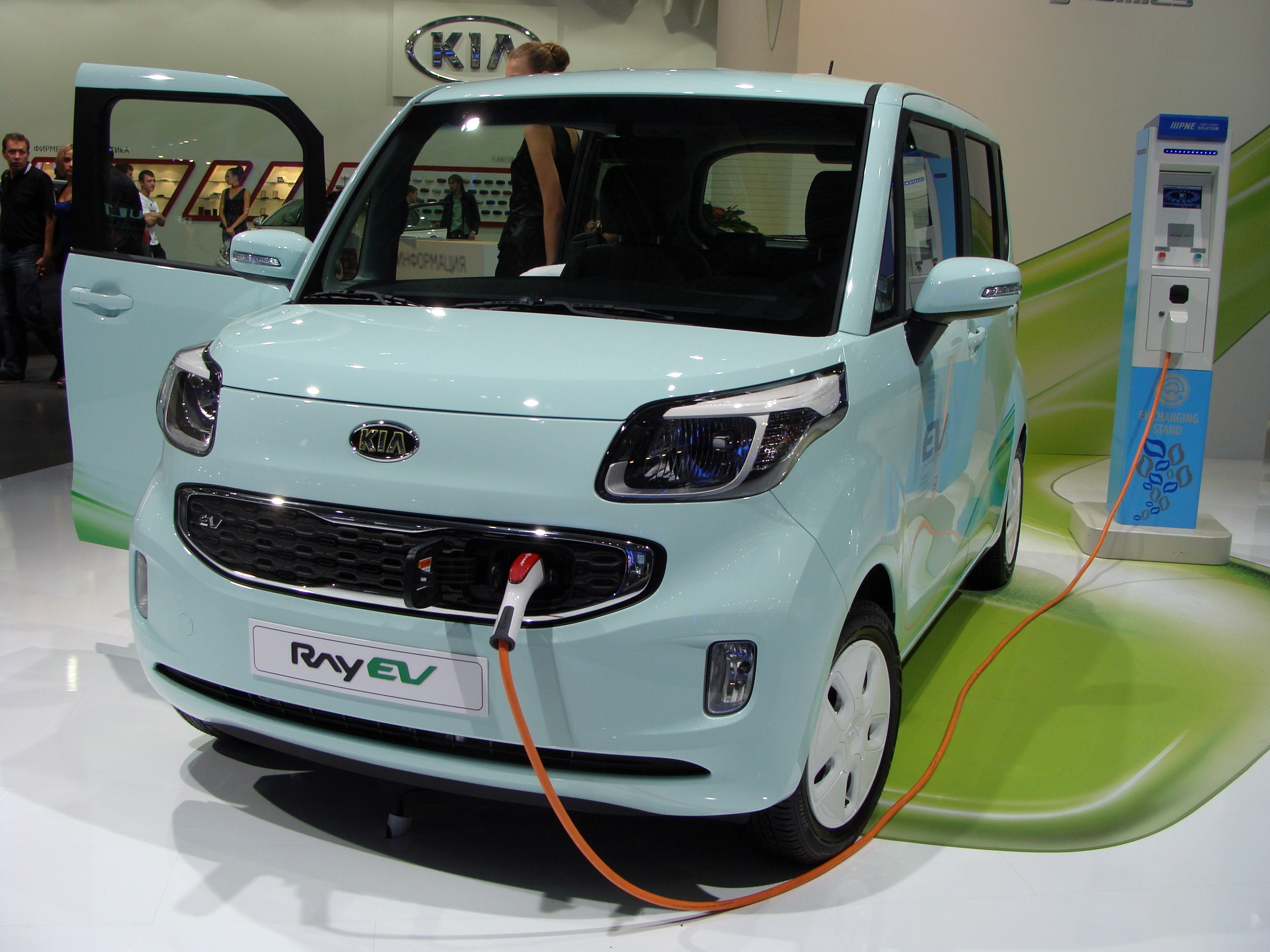
Kia Ray EV (front)

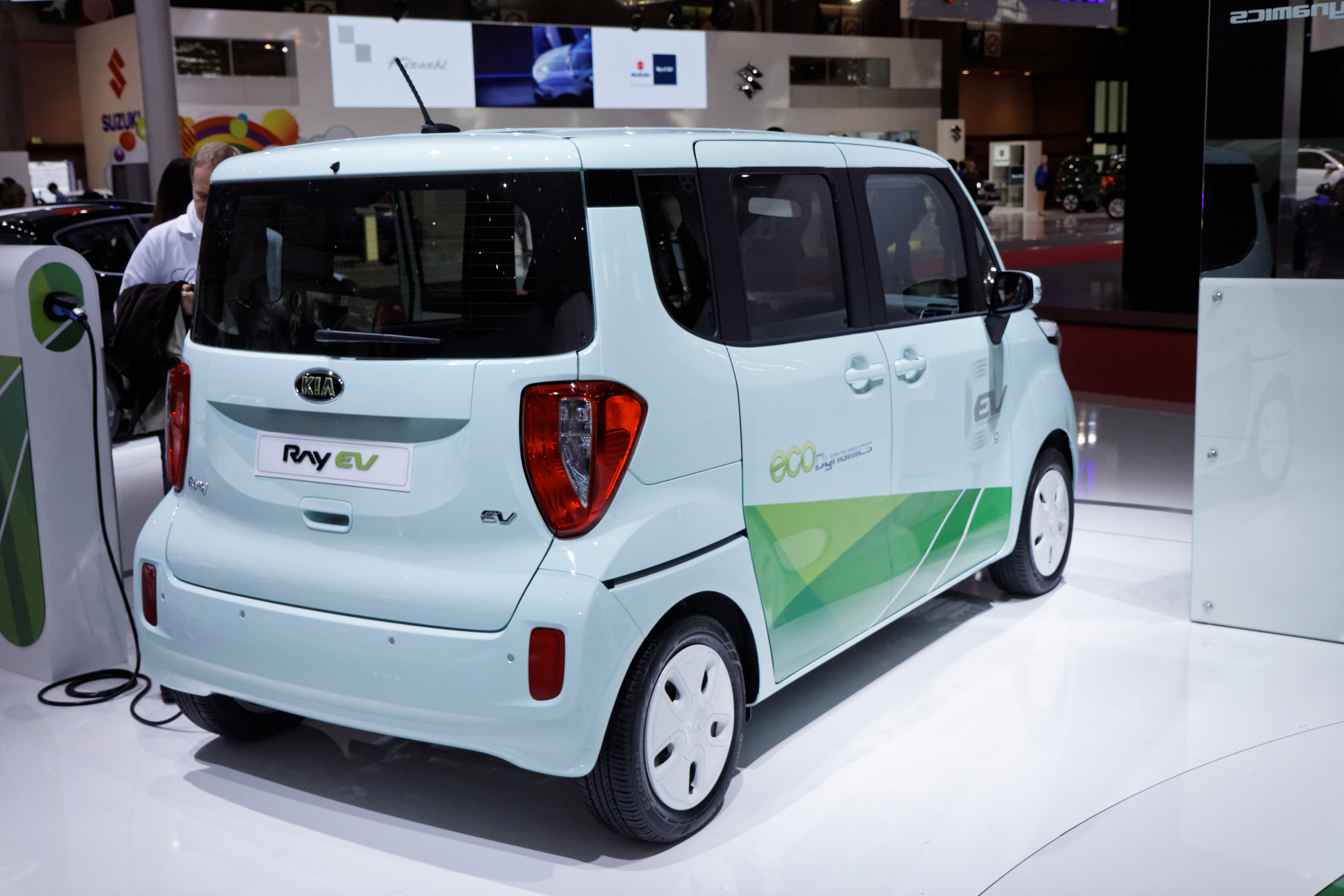
Kia Ray EV (rear)

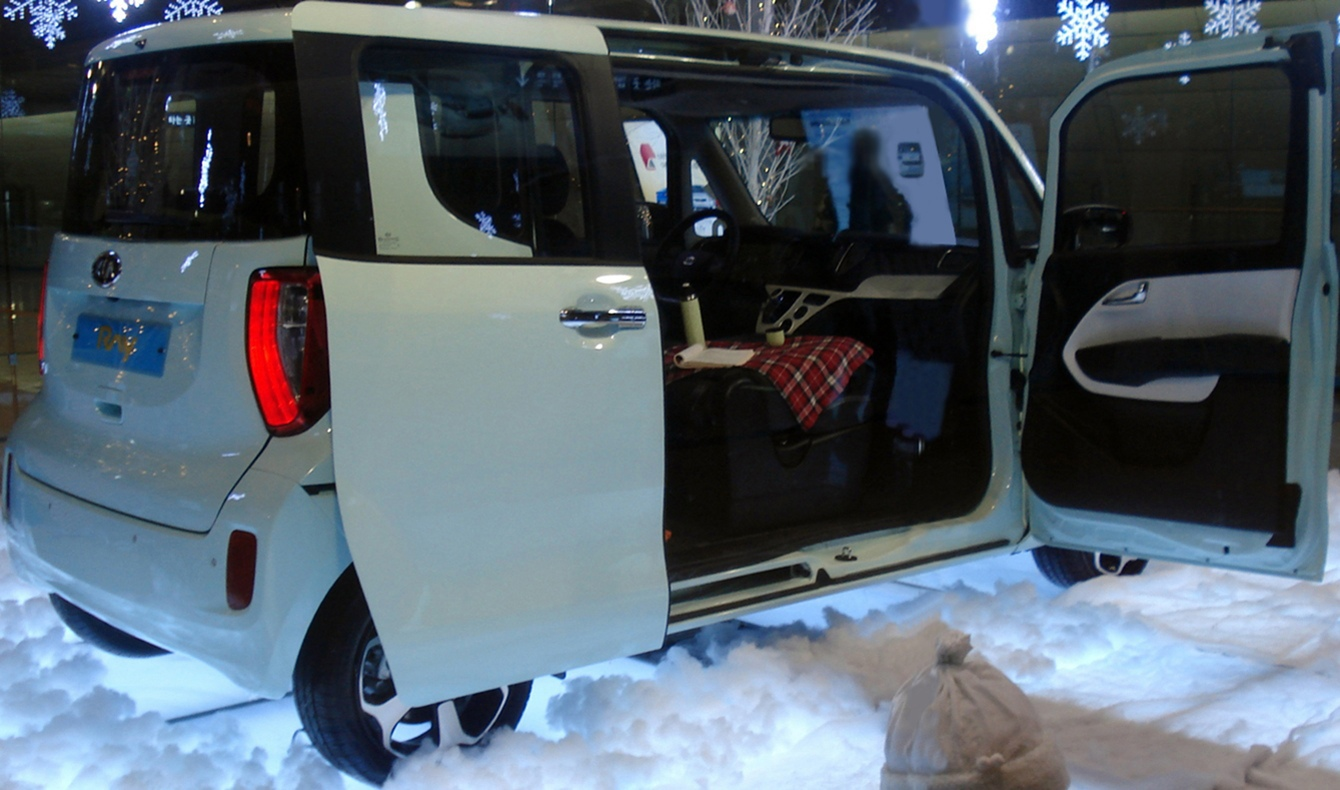
Right side featuring sliding rear door

=== 2017 facelift ===
The New Ray, which received a facelift, was released on December 13, 2017. The radiator grille in the centre of the existing model was raised to the same height as the headlamp and changed to body colour. Wide honeycomb patterns were also applied to tailgate garnish.

The sudden braking alarm system was applied to all trims, and rollover detection was added to the existing six airbags. It is designed to add four-point colours and license plate LED lamps to loops, outer mirror covers, and radiator grills from three popular body colours, Milky Beige, Clear White, and Aurora Black Pearls.

A single-seater Kia Ray Van was released on February 8, 2022. It operates with a total of two trims, Prestige and Prestige Special. Driver convenience specifications such as a driver's heating wire seat and a driver's seat height adjustment device are added to the Prestige Special.

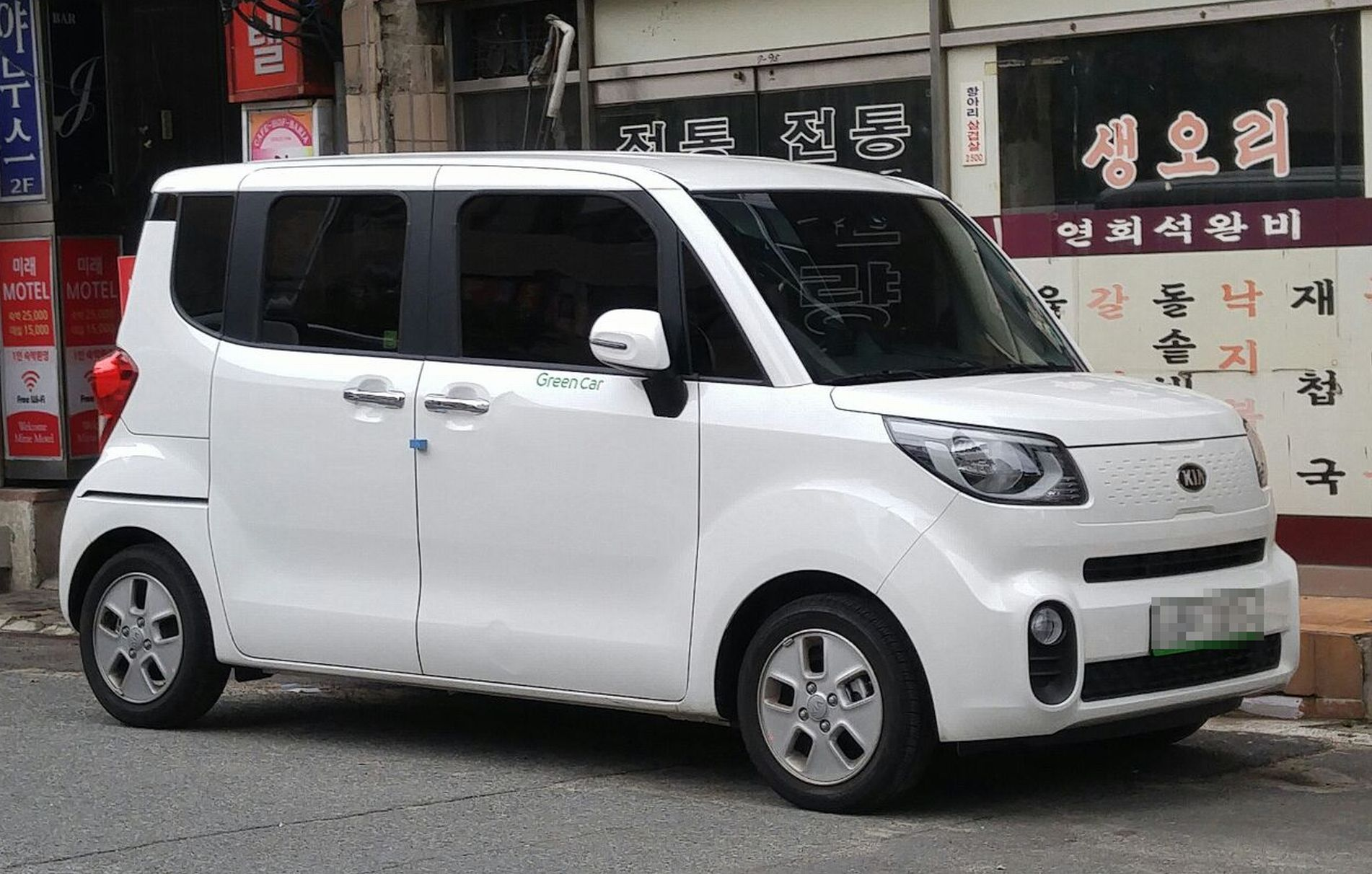
Facelift (front)

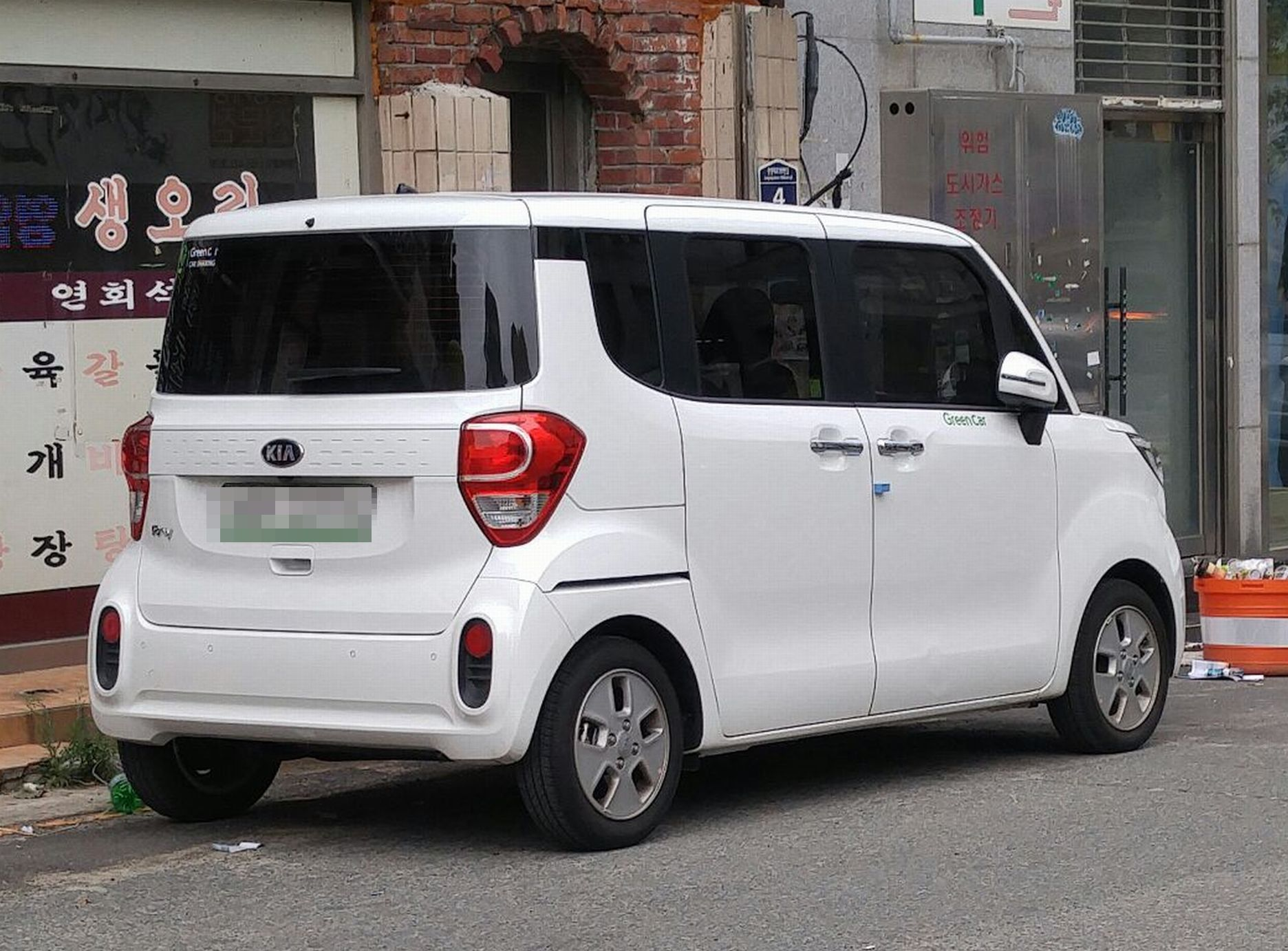
Facelift (rear)

=== 2022 facelift ===
The New Kia Ray, which received a second facelift, was unveiled on August 10, 2022 and released on September 1. On the front, Starmap signature lighting and centre garnish are placed horizontally. The bumper has a flat, angular design. The skid plate was applied to the lower part of the bumper. A 15-inch alloy wheel with a geometric shape is applied to the side. On the rear, a rear combination lamp was applied, and Starmap signature lighting was placed on the edge of the rear combination lamp. In addition, an additional non-exposed tailgate handle was applied. A 4.2-inch LCD cluster design was applied to the interior, and a light gray interior was added.

Driver assistance system and convenience features such as Rear Cross-Traffic Collision-Avoidance Assist, Safe Exit Warning, ventilated driver's seat, air-purification mode are also applied.

On November 17, 2022, Gravity, the design differentiation model of The New Kia Ray, was added. Gravity is based on Ray's top trim signature and applies new design elements to create a tough-looking exterior. The dark metal front centre garnish and rear tailgate garnish give a solid impression, and black colours are applied to the front and rear skid plates, A-pillars, roof, and exterior mirrors to create a sophisticated atmosphere. On the sides, 15-inch black alloy wheels are applied.

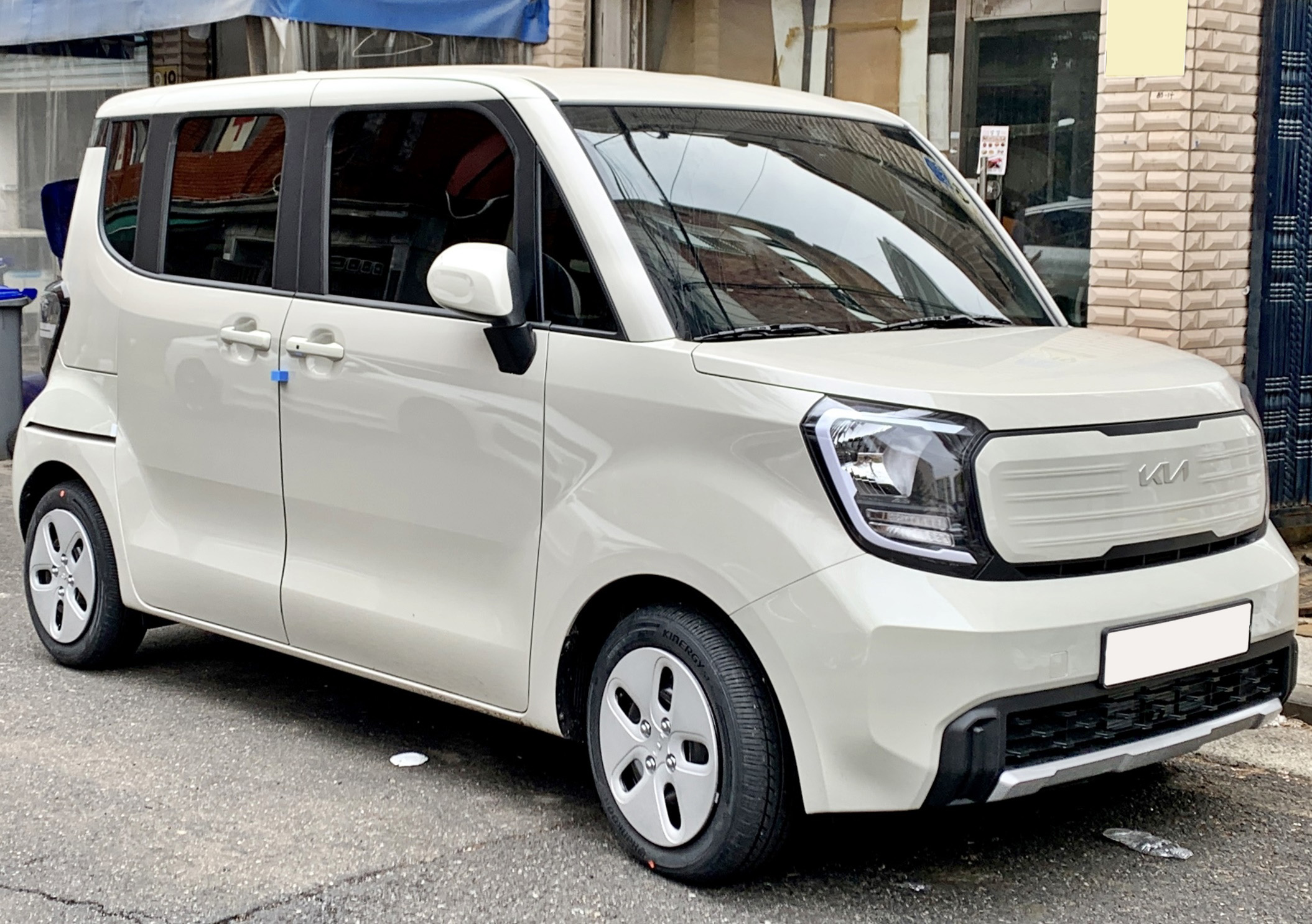
Facelift (front) (South Korea)

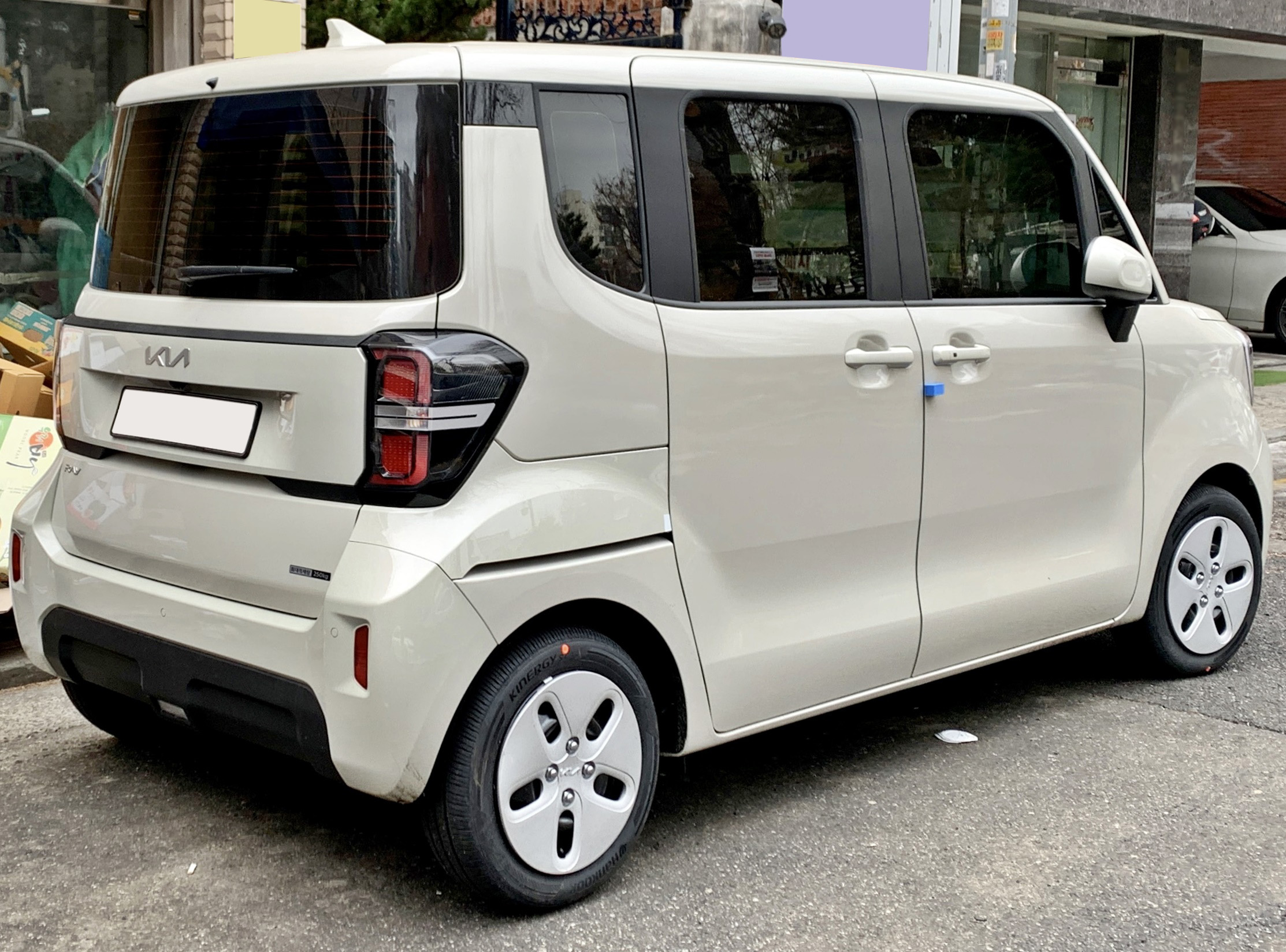
Facelift (rear) (South Korea)

=== Kia Ray EV (2023) ===
The updated Kia Ray EV launched on September 21, 2023, with availability limited to South Korea. Compared to the prior version which had been discontinued in 2018, the price was cut significantly from ₩45 million to ₩27.4 million, approximately ₩20 million after national and local incentives. It follows the styling changes introduced for the 2022 update and has a maximum range of 205 km (127 mi). Rated efficiency is 5.1 km/kWh (106.8 mpg‑e) in combined city/highway driving.

It is equipped with an electric traction motor with a maximum output of 64.3 kW (86.2 hp) and 147 N⋅m (108 lbf⋅ft) of torque. The 265 V, 35.2 kW-hr LiFePO_{4} battery is rated to replenish up to an 80% state of charge in 40 minutes using a 100 kW DC source; on a household AC source, it recharges in six hours. The charging port is in the front grille.

Kia Ray sales have grown year-on-year since 2017; the 2023 increase was credited to the introduction of the updated EV model. In the first quarter of 2024, the Kia Ray EV was the best-selling domestically produced electric vehicle in South Korea, with 2,442 vehicles sold; for all electric vehicles sold in Korea, it was second overall behind the Tesla Model Y, which sold 6,012 during the same period.

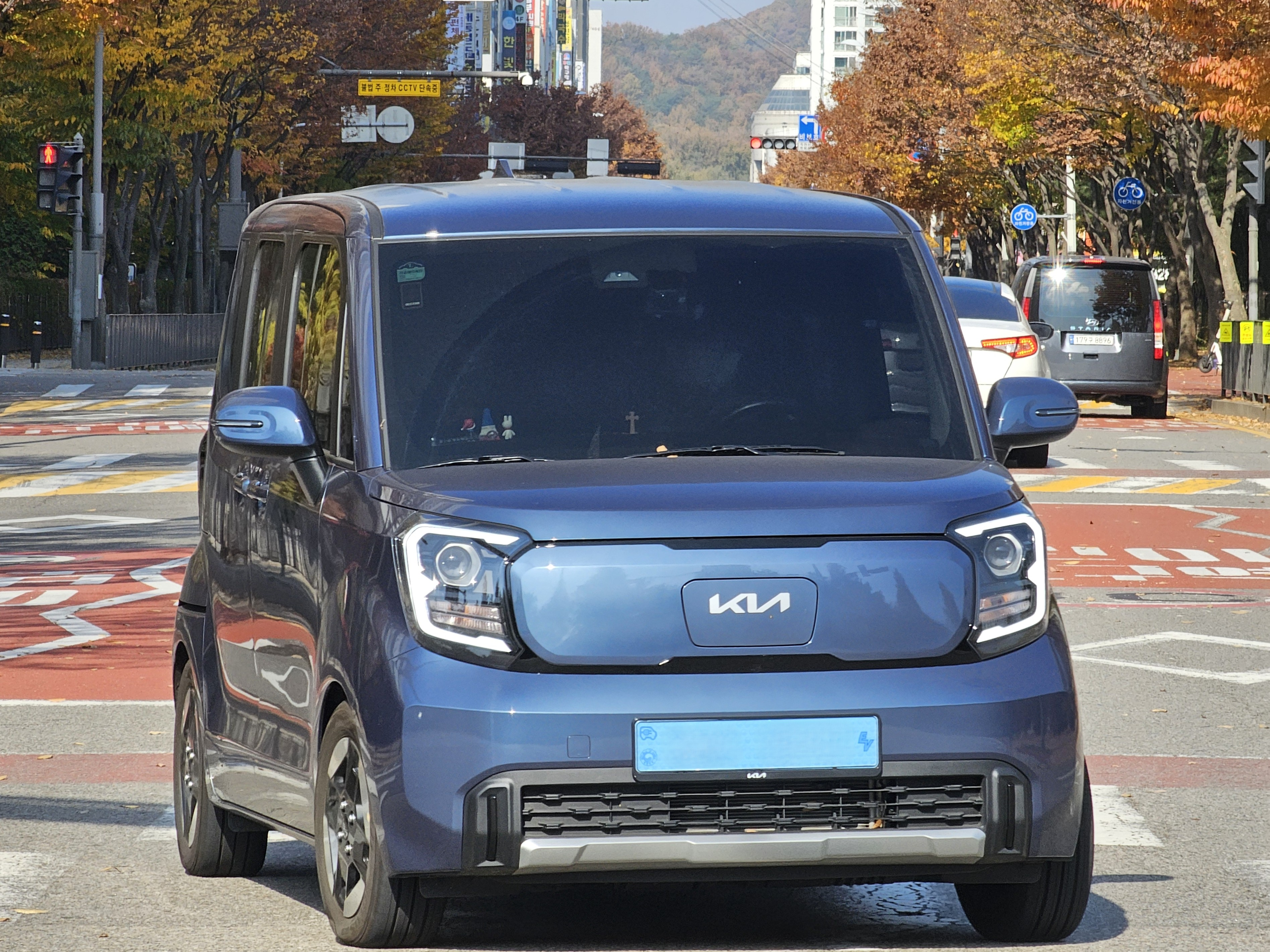
Kia Ray EV

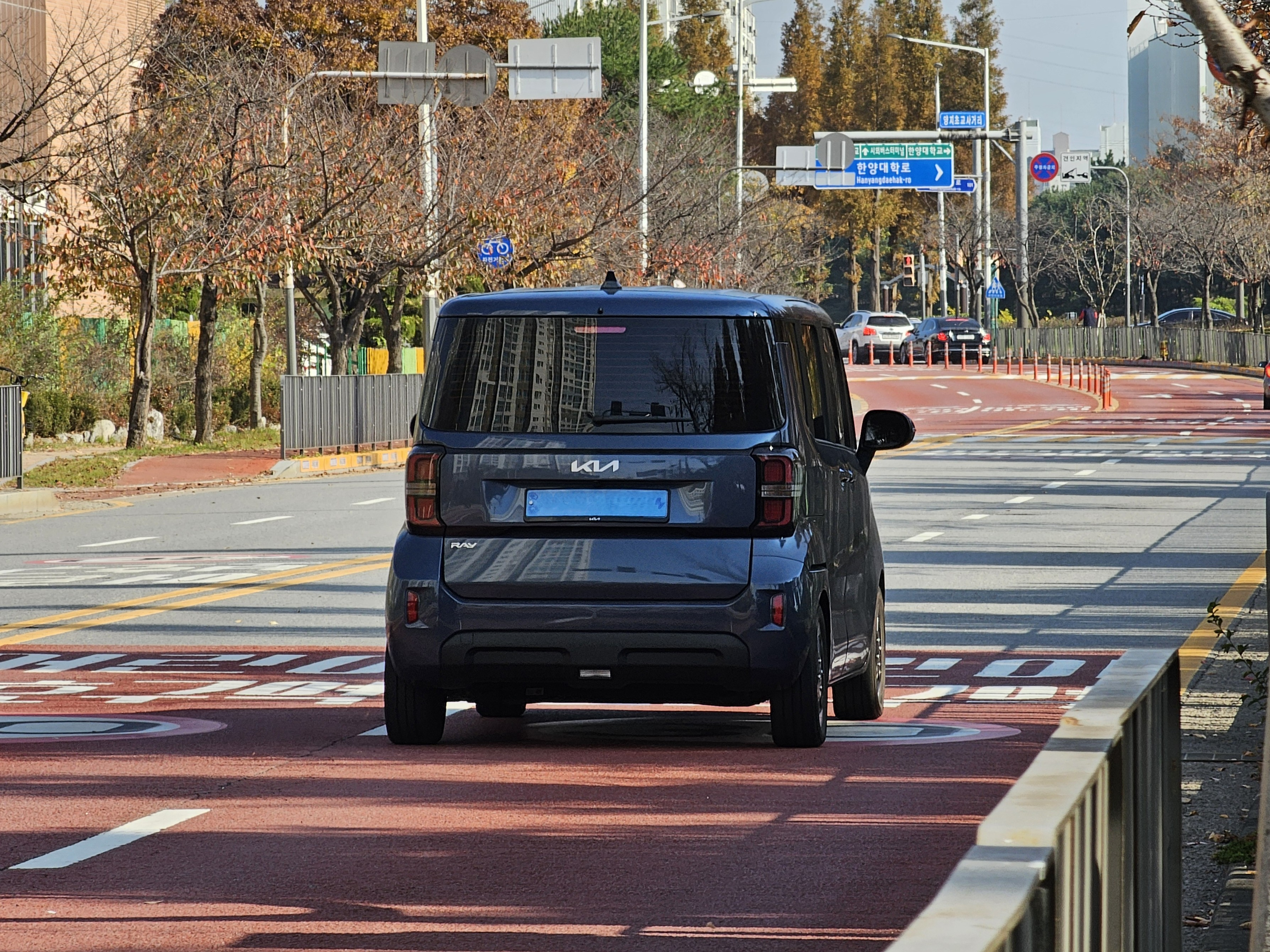
Rear View

=== Sales ===
Year	South Korea
2011	4,107
2012	43,891
2013	27,421
2014	30,113
2015	25,985
2016	19,819
2017	20,521
2018	27,021
2019	27,831
2020	28,530
2021	35,956
2022	44,566
2023	50,930
2024	48,991
