= Rena, Washington =

Unincorporated community in Washington, United States

- Unincorporated community
- Location within Washington (state) Location within the United States
- Coordinates: 48°05′21″N 123°11′13″W
- Country: United States
- State: Washington
- County: Clallam
- Established: 1891
- Elevation: 171 ft (52 m)
- Time zone: UTC-8 (Pacific (PST))
  - Summer (DST): UTC-7 (PDT)
- GNIS feature ID: 1530533

Rena is a former community in Clallam County, in the U.S. state of Washington.

== History ==
A post office called Rena was established in 1891, and remained in operation until 1902. The community was named after Reena Hooker, daughter of a local settler. A school operated at Rena from 1888 to 1912, and the town remained a "recognized community" until about 1915, when the land was bought for the construction of a mill. The mill changed hands several times before ultimately closing in 1967, by which time Rena was no longer recognized as distinct from neighboring Carlsborg.
