= Laura Reina =

Italian-American physicist

Laura Reina is an Italian and American theoretical particle physicist whose research uses quantum chromodynamics for the Standard Model to predict the behavior of experiments in high-energy nuclear physics, and especially those concerning the Higgs boson. She is FSU Distinguished Research Professor of Physics at Florida State University, where she holds the Joseph F. Owens endowed professorship, and is a 2026–2027 Robert O. Lawton Distinguished Professor.

== Education and career ==
Reina received a laurea in physics in 1988 at the University of Milan, and continued her studies for a 1992 Ph.D. at the International School for Advanced Studies in Trieste, Italy, advised by Guido Martinelli.

After postdoctoral research at the Université libre de Bruxelles in Belgium, the Brookhaven National Laboratory, and the University of Wisconsin–Madison, she became an assistant professor of physics at Florida State University in 1998. She became a full professor in 2007, and was named as a distinguished research professor in 2017.

== Recognition ==
Reina was named as a Fellow of the American Physical Society (APS) in 2005, after a nomination from the APS Division of Particles and Fields, "for contributions to calculations of Higgs production at hadron colliders and rare B decays". She was elected as a Fellow of the American Association for the Advancement of Science in 2011.
