= Hyundai Reina =

Subcompact sedan

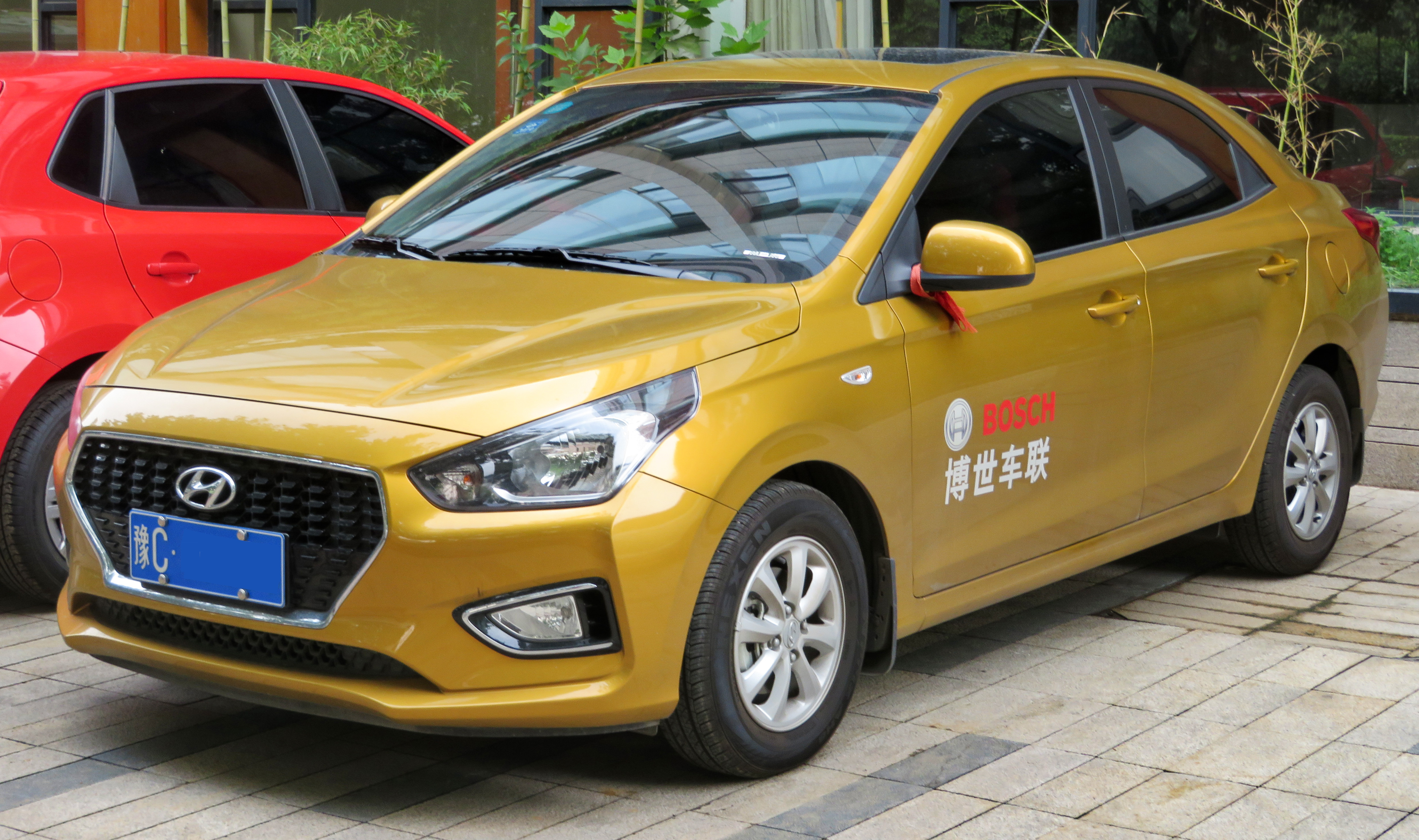

Overview
- Manufacturer: Hyundai
- Model code: CB
- Also called: Hyundai Verna
- Production: 2017–2021
- Model years: 2018–2021
- Assembly: China: Chongqing (Beijing Hyundai)

Body and chassis
- Class: Subcompact car (B)
- Body style: 4-door sedan
- Layout: Front-engine, front-wheel-drive
- Platform: Hyundai-Kia PB
- Related: Hyundai Accent/Verna (RB/RC); Kia Pegas/Soluto

Powertrain
- Engine: Petrol: 1.4 L Kappa II MPi I4
- Transmission: 5-speed manual; 4-speed automatic

Dimensions
- Wheelbase: 2,570 mm (101.2 in)
- Length: 4,300 mm (169.3 in)
- Width: 1,700 mm (66.9 in)
- Height: 1,460 mm (57.5 in)

Chronology
- Predecessor: Hyundai Verna (RC) (China)

The Hyundai Reina (Chinese: 现代瑞纳; pinyin: Xiàndài Ruìnà) is a subcompact sedan manufactured in China by Hyundai through the Beijing Hyundai joint venture. The Reina went on sale in September 2017 in China and is the first car produced in Beijing Hyundai's Chongqing plant. Hyundai positioned the Reina slightly under the Verna in the country.

Reina is a Spanish word for queen. Since 2019, the Reina is sold as the Hyundai Verna in Latin American markets such as Costa Rica, Chile and Peru.

== Overview ==
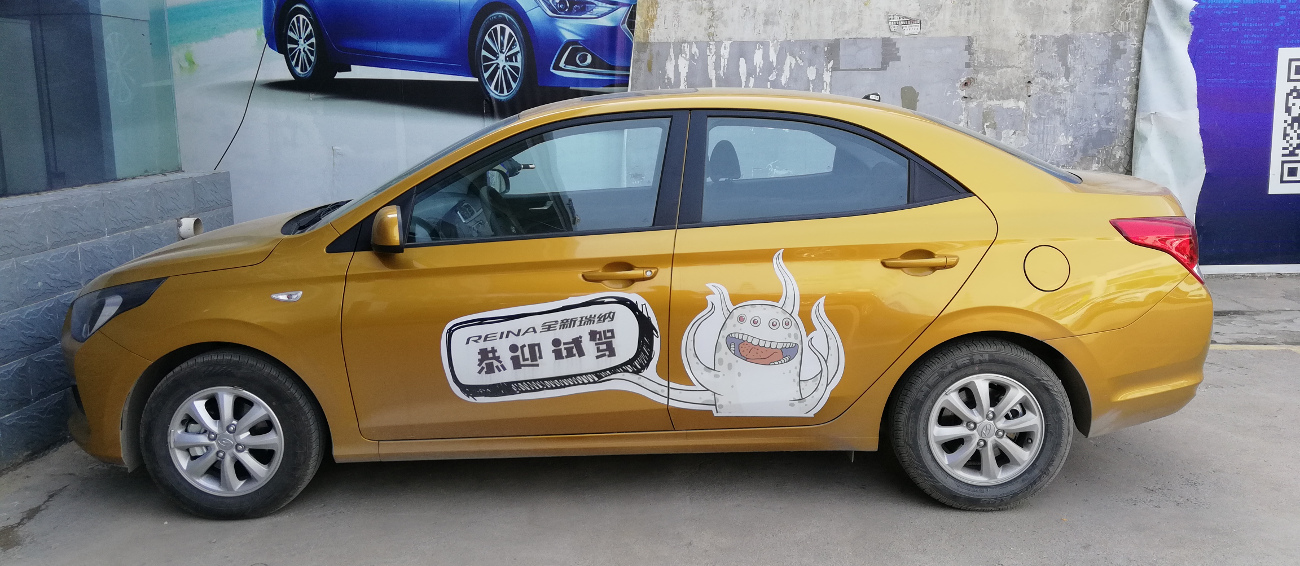
Side view

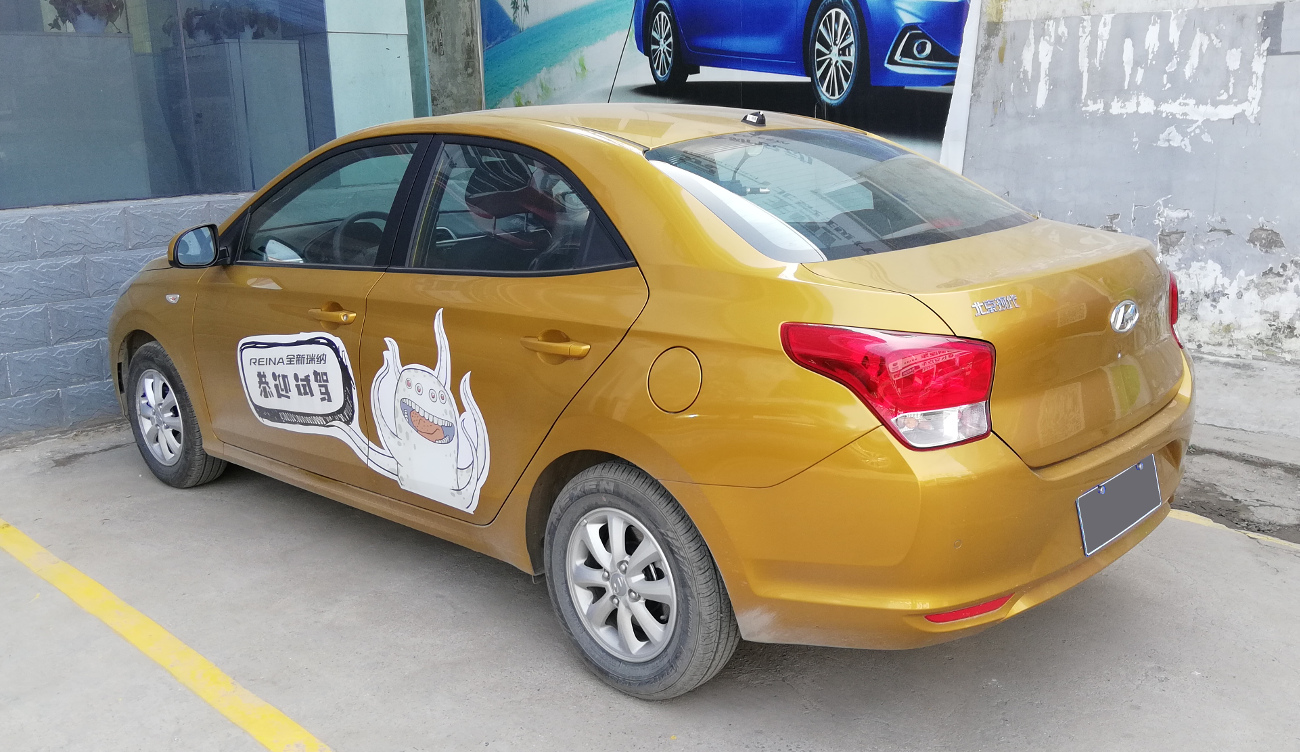
Rear view

The Hyundai Reina made its debut at the 2017 Chongqing Motor Show. Based on the PB platform used in the Hyundai Accent/Verna, the Reina stands on a 2,570 mm (101.2 in) wheelbase and has a trunk capacity of 475 liters. Powering the car is a 1.4-liter Kappa MPI I4 engine that generates 97 hp (98 PS; 72 kW) and 93 lb⋅ft (126 N⋅m; 12.9 kg⋅m) torque to the front wheels.

The Reina was released in the Philippines in March 2019. It replaces the Eon when launched in the country.
