= Sky Punks =

2015 video game

- Developer: Fathom Interactive
- Publisher: Rovio Stars
- Platforms: iOS, Android
- Release: April 9, 2015

Sky Punks is a 2015 endless racing freemium video game developed by Fathom Interactive and published by Rovio Stars.

== Gameplay ==
Sky Punks is an endless racing game. Different characters' stories remain mysteries until these stories are collected during gameplay. The game features crystals and coins that the player finds or using real money to purchase that unlocks new abilities and Glide wings to use in Neo Terra.
