= Retina (or More Fun Than a Vat of Love) =

Studio album by How to Swim
- Released: 4 October 2010
- Recorded: 2008–2009
- Genre: Indie rock, alternative rock, pop
- Label: Personal Hygiene (2010)
- Producer: Gavin Thomson / Ink Wilson

How to Swim chronology
A Little Orgasm of Disappointment (2008)	Retina (or More Fun Than a Vat of Love) (2010)

Retina (or More Fun Than a Vat of Love) is a ten-track album by Scottish orchestral rock band How to Swim. Produced by Gavin Thomson and the band's own Ink Wilson, the record was released on 4 October 2010 through Personal Hygiene Records.

Guest musicians include saxophonist Tom Brogan from Glasgow band The Low Miffs as well as Kimberley Moore, vocalist with Zoey Van Goey, who takes lead vocals on the track "False".

The record is the first full-length How to Swim release to not be a compilation of earlier EPs or singles.

== Track listing ==
1. "Diego Whirlwind" – 4:08
2. "Inferiority" – 3:20
3. "High School Apocalypse" – 4:00
4. "From Here to Dundee Slash Eternity" – 4:53
5. "Genesis P and Me" – 4:24
6. "False" – 4:41
7. "The Ghastly Ones" - 3:41
8. "Activity.Anxiety.Trust" - 3:11
9. "Ink Wilson's World of Fear" - 6:17
10. "It's Alright" - 3:34

== Personnel ==
- Ink Wilson - vocals, guitar
- Sean Callaghan - guitar
- Chris Brown - drums
- Paul Kelly - guitar, piano, keyboards
- Martin Docherty - bass
- Richard Merchant - trumpet
- Ross McCrae - trombone
- Hannah Rankine - saxophone
- Heather North - flute
- Nicola West - cello
- Annie MacFarlane - violin
- Anna Webster - vocals
