= Rena (footballer) =

Portuguese footballer

Personal information
- Full name: Renato Reis de Andrade
- Date of birth: 1 July 1994 (age 32)
- Place of birth: Espargo, Portugal
- Height: 1.77 m (5 ft 10 in)
- Position: Midfielder

Youth career
- 2003–2013: Feirense

Senior career*
Years	Team	Apps	(Gls)
2013–2017	Feirense	5	(0)
2014–2015	→ Cesarense (loan)	23	(0)
2015–2016	→ São João Ver (loan)	25	(0)
2016–2017	→ Cesarense (loan)	14	(0)
2017–2019	Lusitânia	34	(0)
2019–2022	Florgrade	51	(2)
- * Club domestic league appearances and goals as of 19:09, 16 November 2023 (UTC)

Renato Reis de Andrade (born 1 July 1994), known as Rena, is a Portuguese professional footballer who plays as a midfielder.
