= Hyundai-Kia small automobile platforms =

Overview
- Manufacturer: Hyundai; Kia

Body and chassis
- Class: City car (A); Subcompact car/supermini (B)
- Layout: Front-engine, front-wheel-drive Front-engine, all-wheel-drive (GB only)
- Platform: A-segment: FF, SA, BA; B-segment: LC, JB, PB, GB

Chronology
- Successor: Hyundai-Kia K1 platform Hyundai-Kia K2 platform

Hyundai and Kia utilized several iterations of platforms for their small automobile line-up since 1997.

== FF platform ==
The FF platform is the first city car platform developed by Hyundai for its first A-segment city car, the Hyundai Atos. Introduced in 1997, production continued until 2014, when the Hyundai Santro Xing was discontinued.

- Hyundai Atos/Atoz (FF) (1997–2007)
- Hyundai Atos/Atoz/Santro/Amica/Kia Visto (MX) (1998–2014)
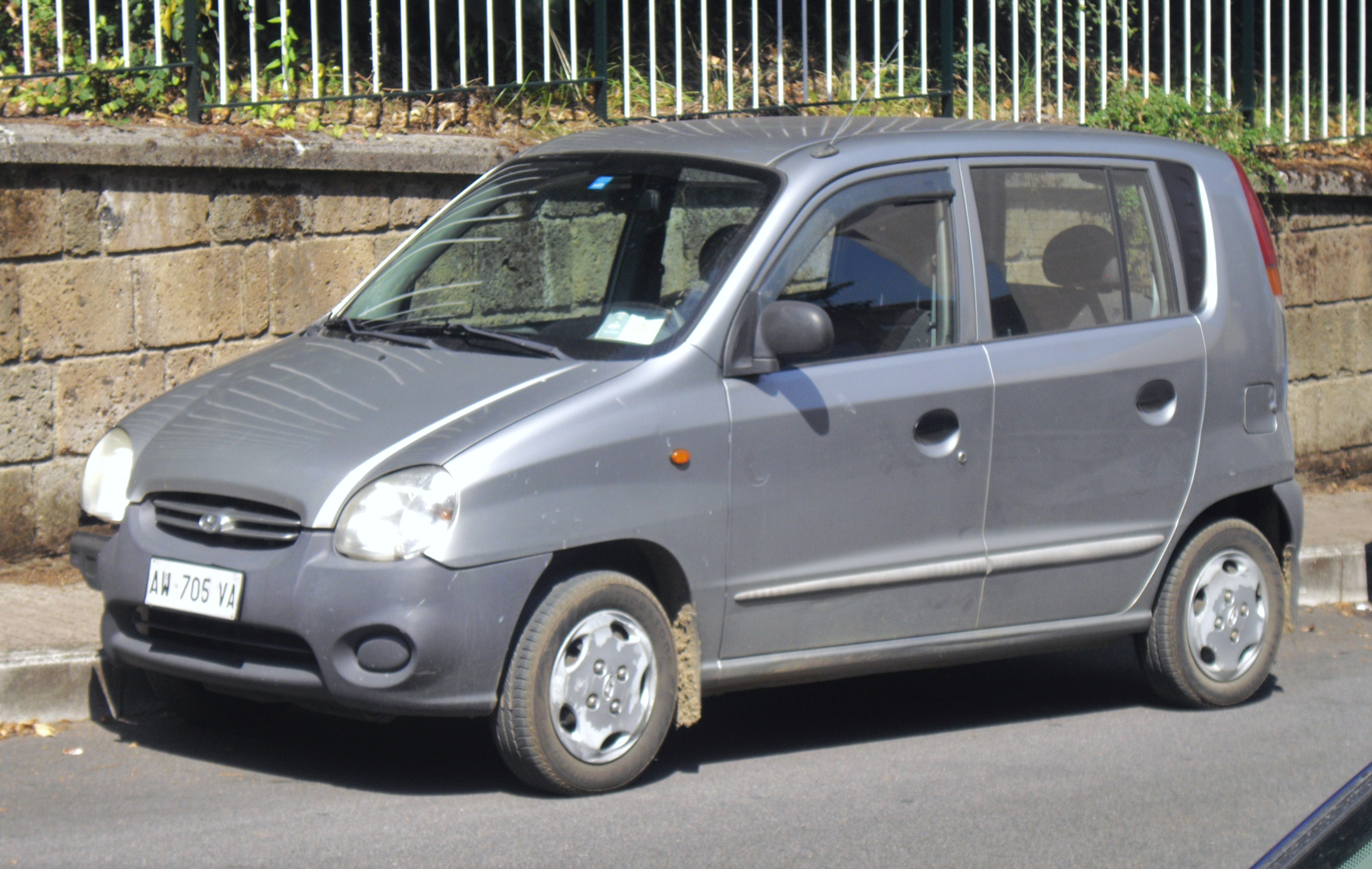
Hyundai Atos (FF)

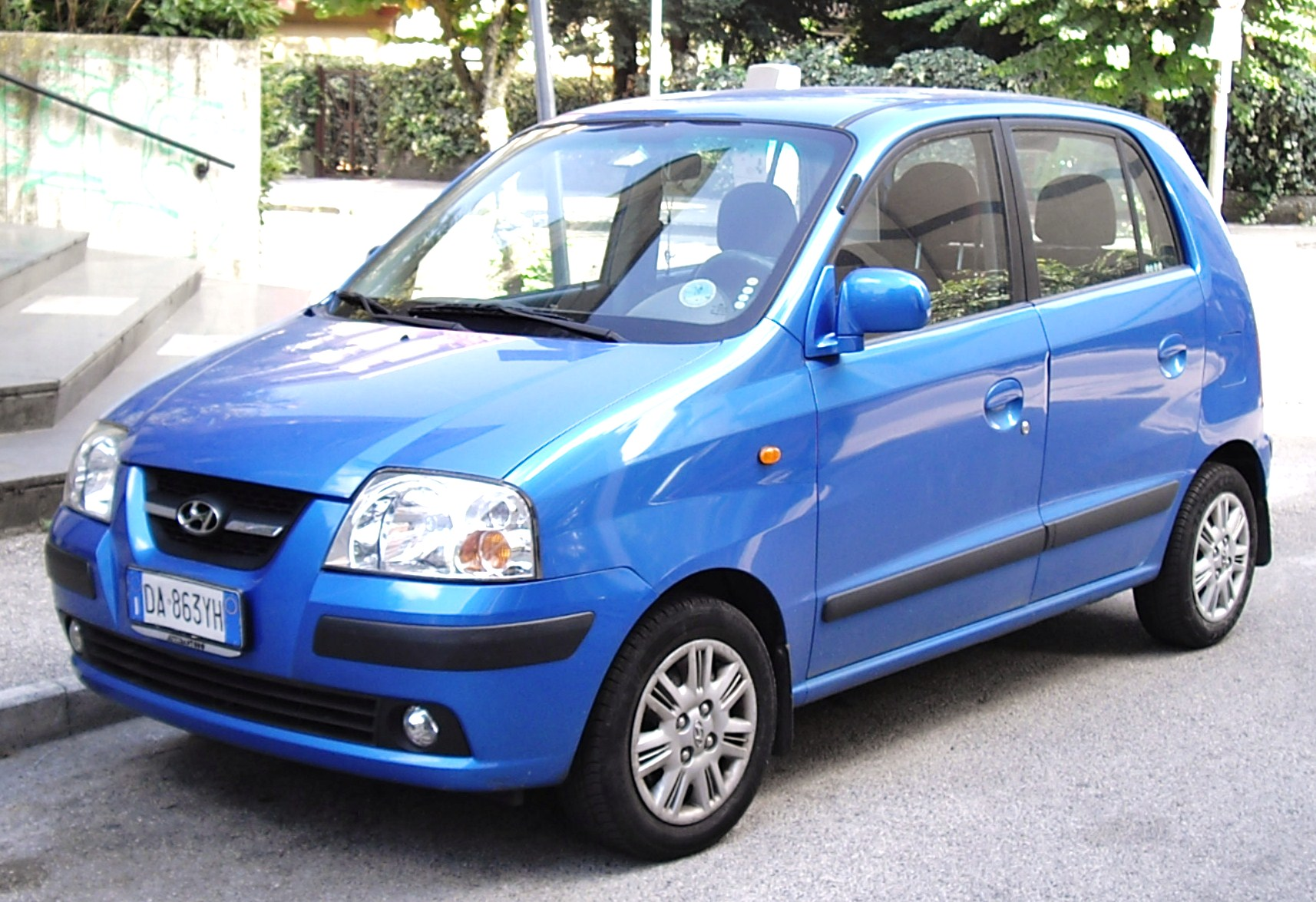
Hyundai Atos (MX)

== SA platform ==
The SA platform is a successor of the FF platform, mainly utilized for A-segment vehicles starting from 2004. The platform was derived as a shortened version of the LC platform.

- Hyundai Eon (HA) (2011–2019)
- Hyundai i10 (PA) (2007–2014)
- Kia Picanto/Morning (SA) (2004–2011)
- Kia Picanto/Morning (TA) (2011–2017)
- Kia Ray (TAM) (2012–present)
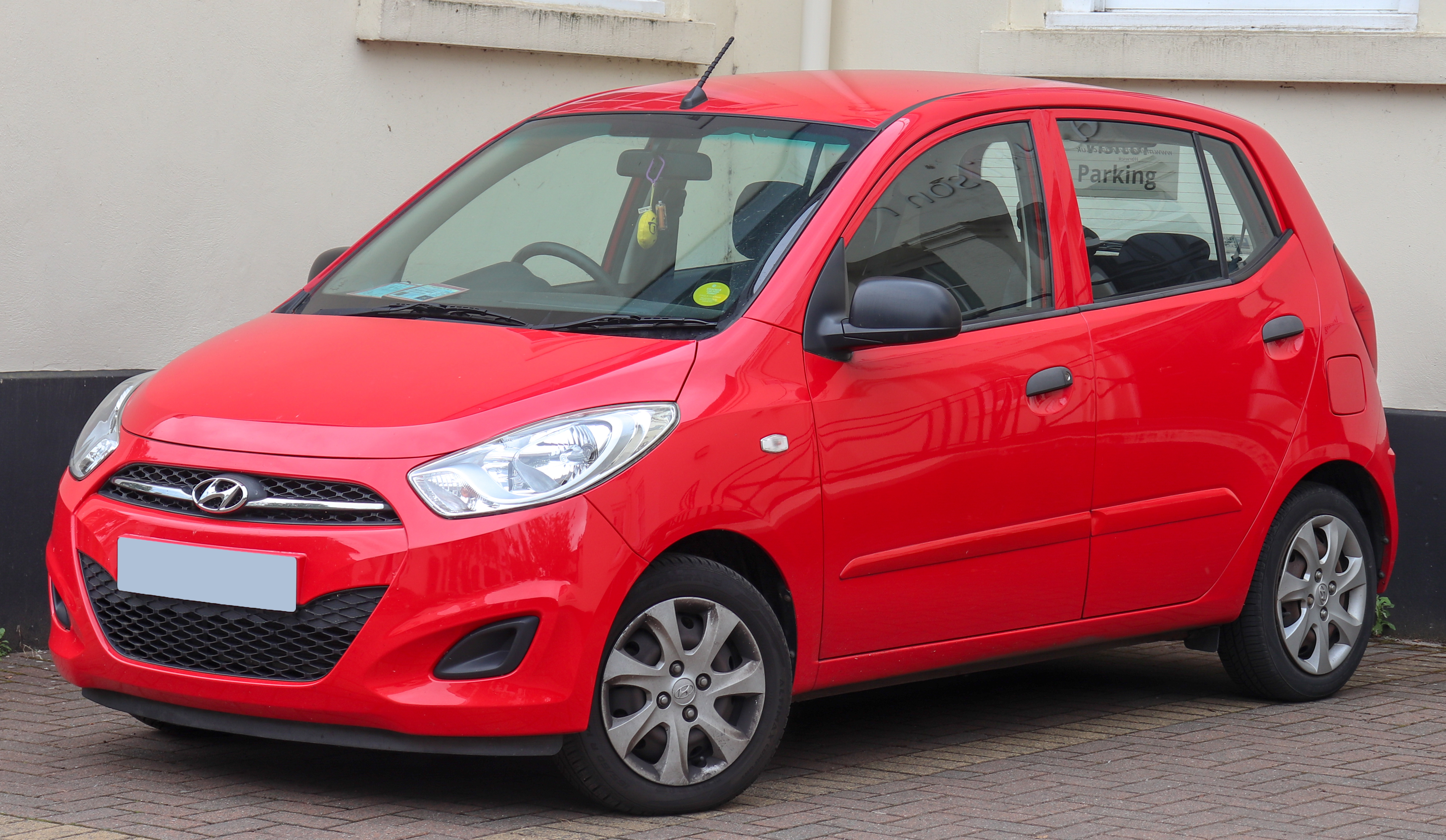
Hyundai i10 (PA)

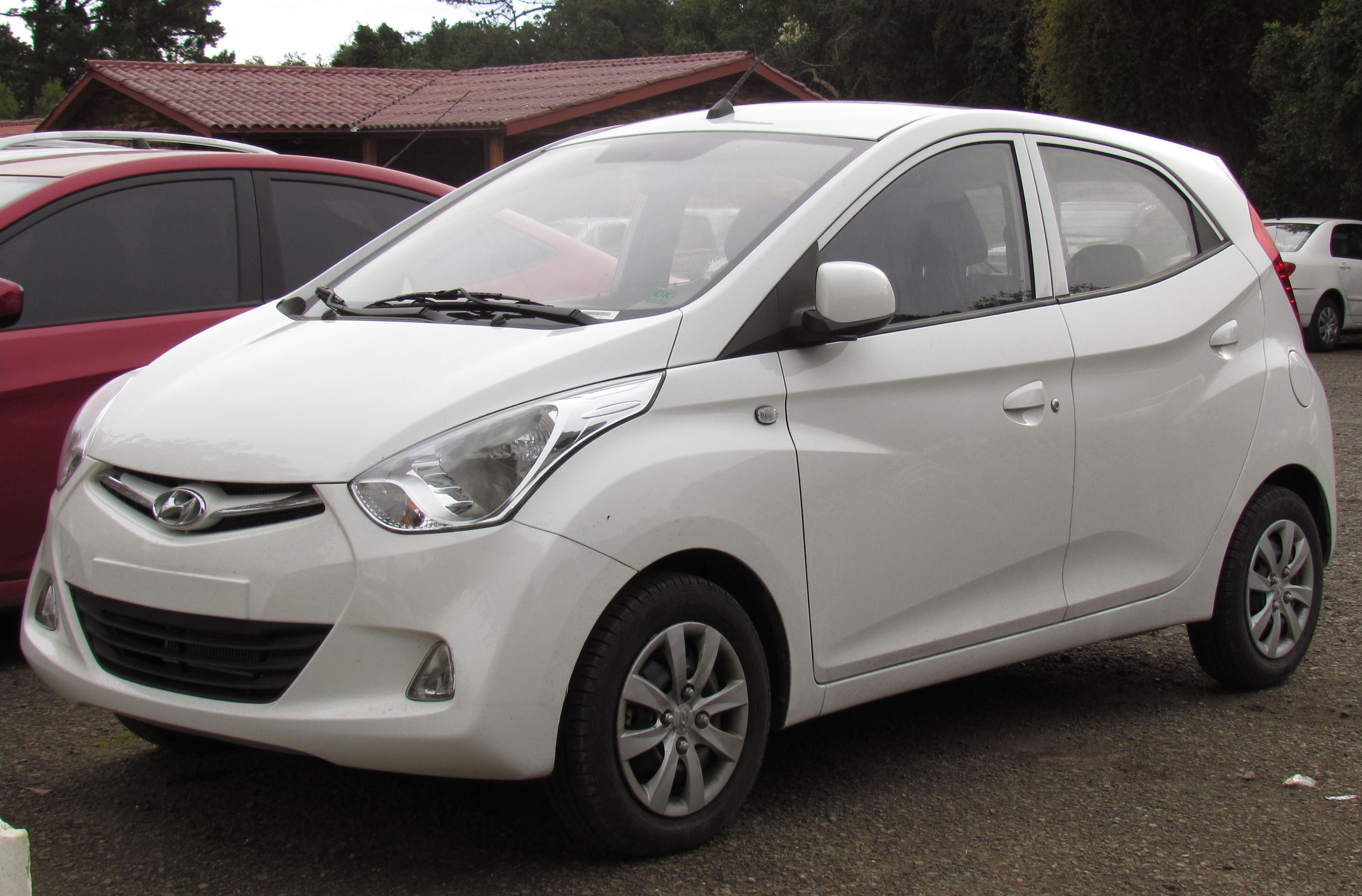
Hyundai Eon (HA)

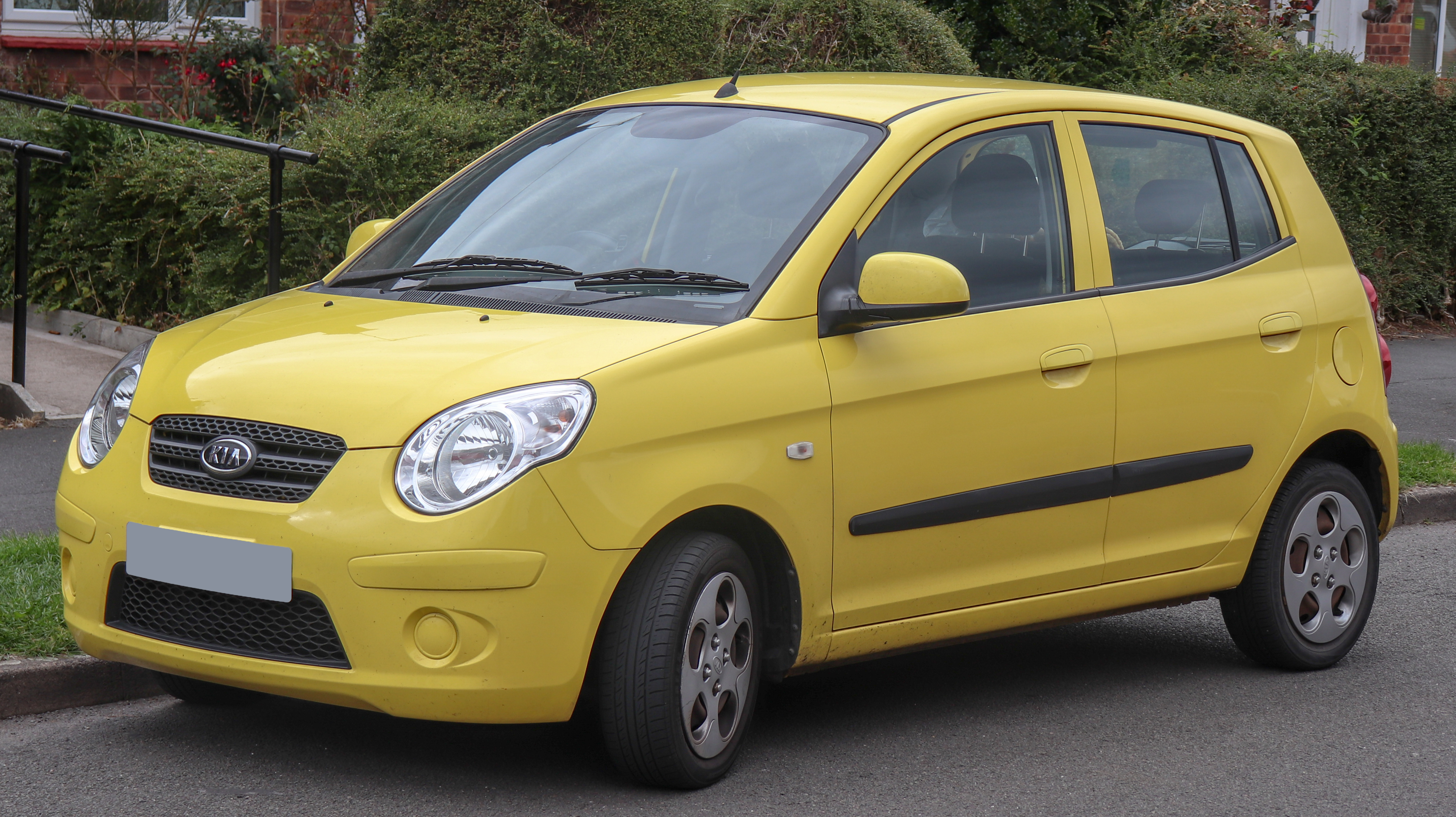
Kia Picanto (SA)

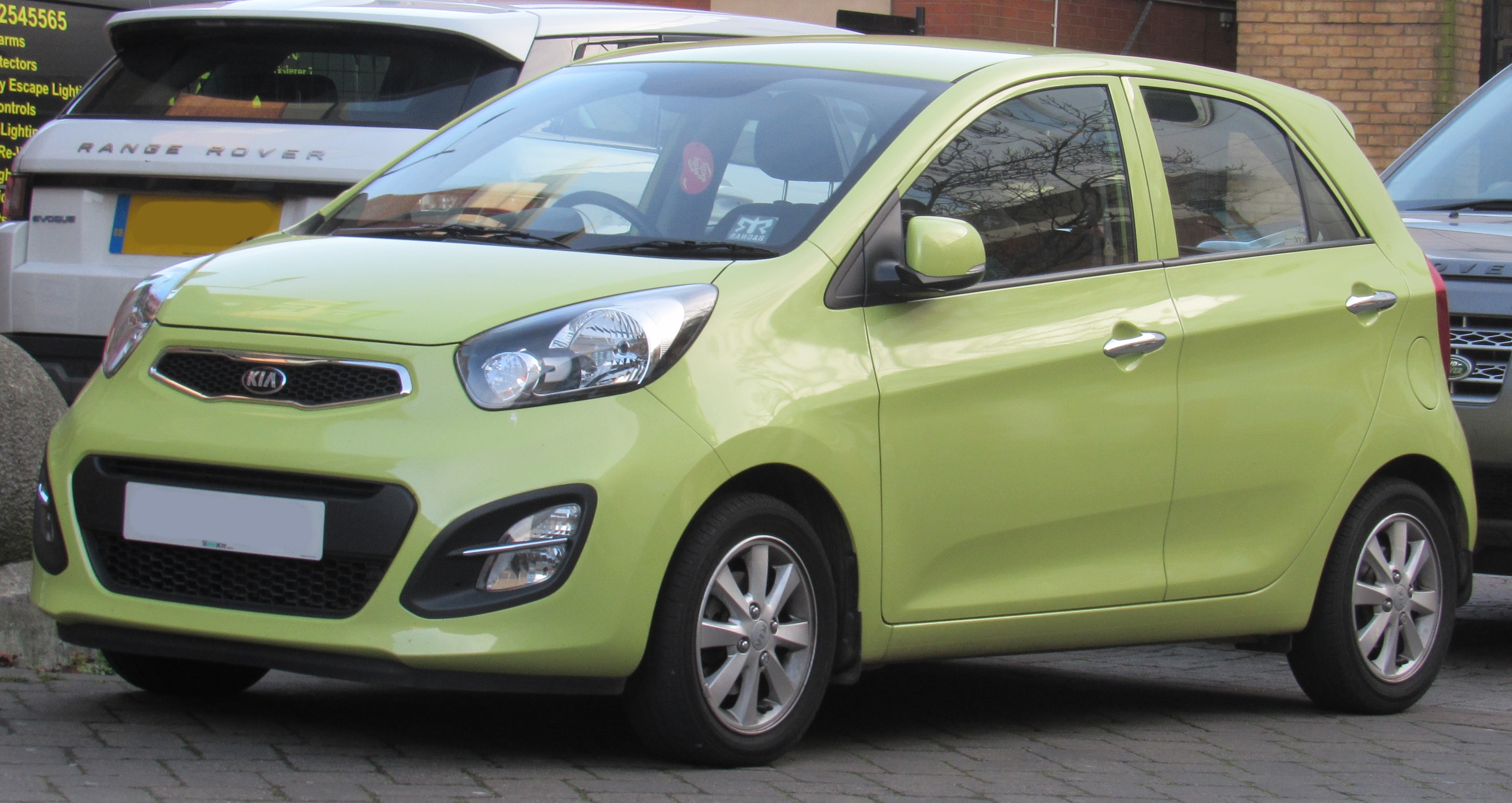
Kia Picanto (TA)

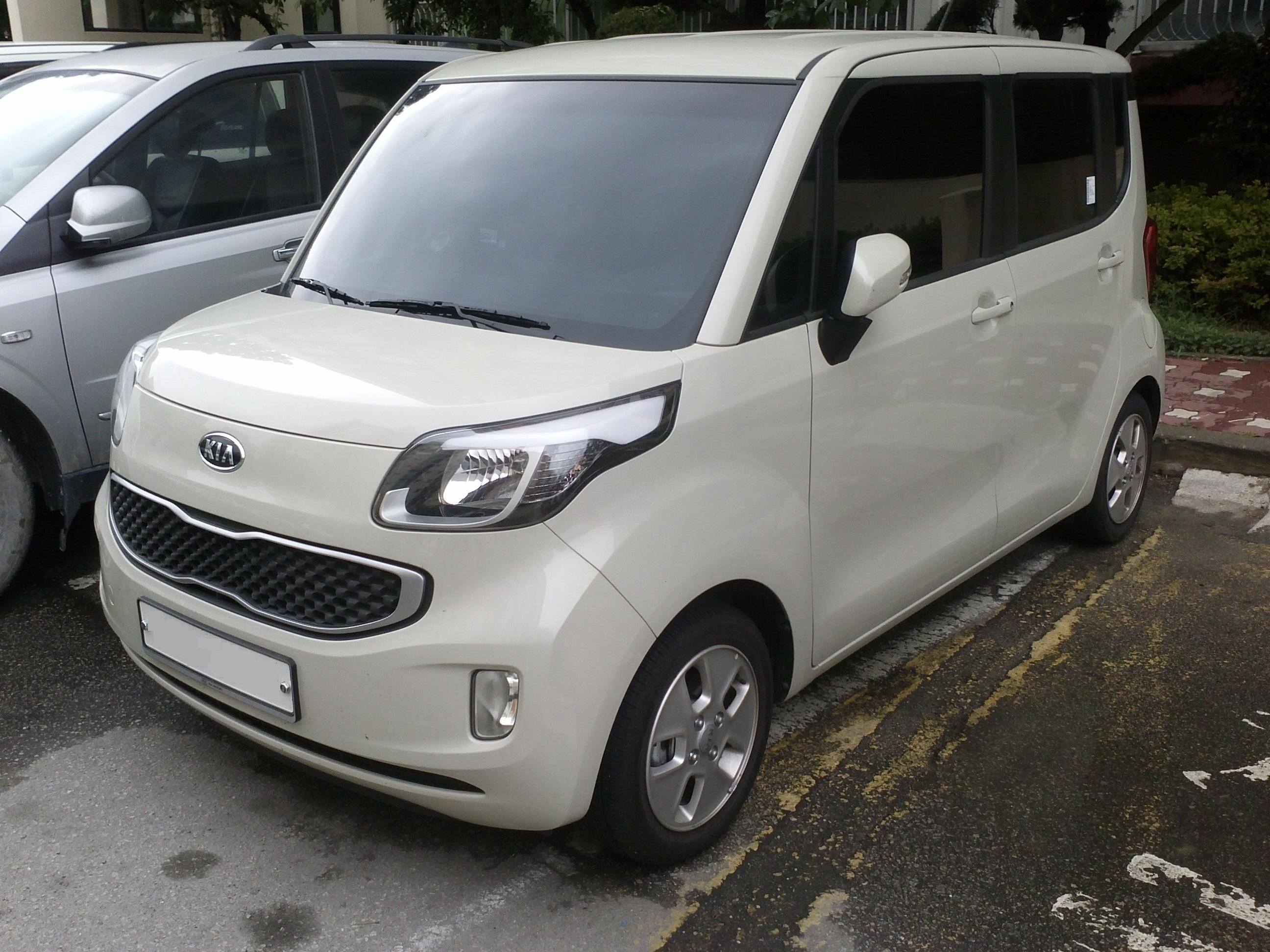
Kia Ray

== BA platform ==
The BA platform is a successor of the SA platform, mainly utilized for A-segment vehicles starting from 2014.

- Hyundai i10 (IA) (2014–2019)
- Hyundai Grand i10 (BA) (2014–2019)
- Hyundai i10 (AC3) (2019–present)
- Hyundai Xcent/Grand i10 sedan (BA) (2014–2023)
- Kia Picanto/Morning (JA) (2017–present)
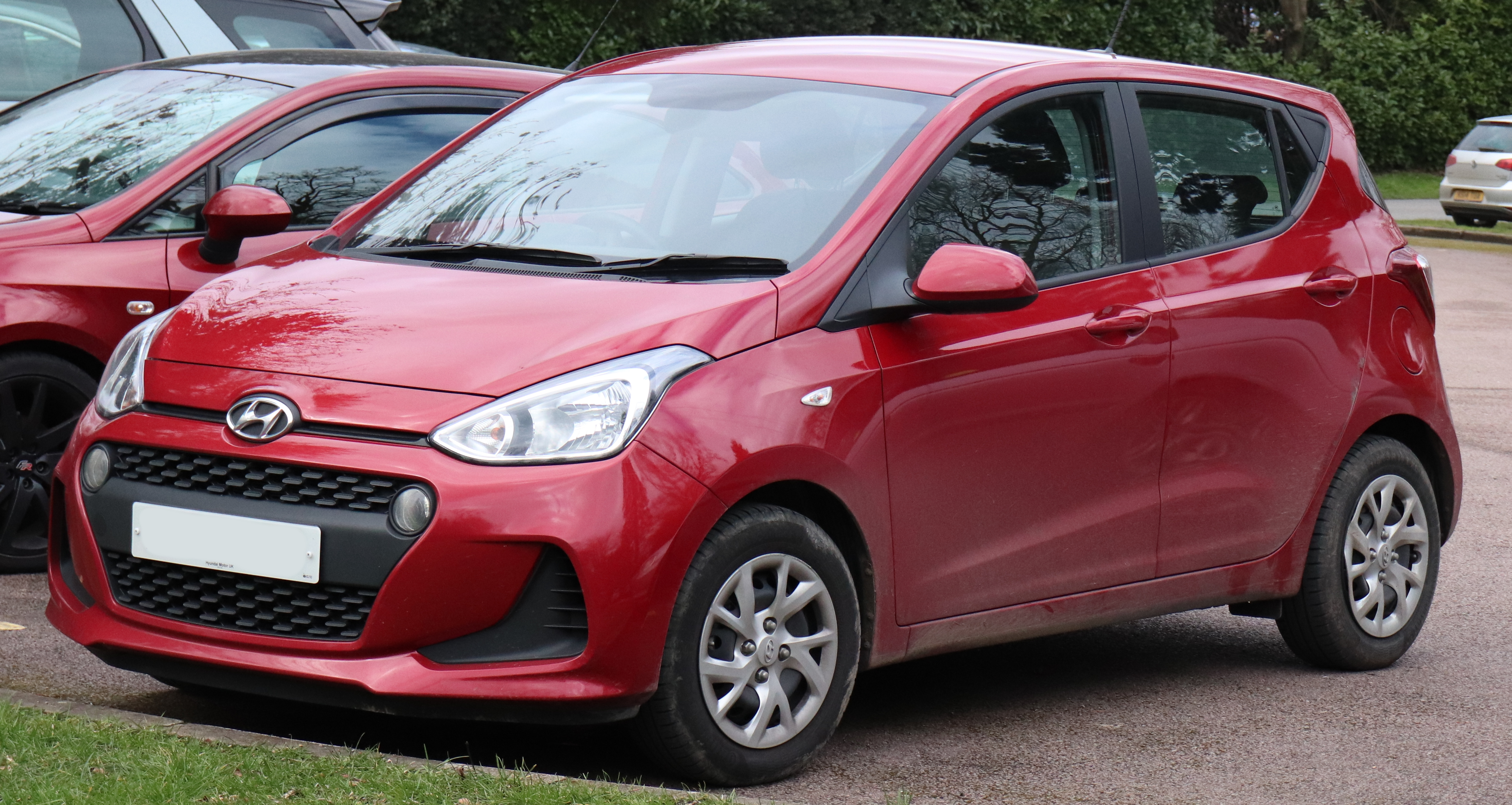
Hyundai i10 (IA)

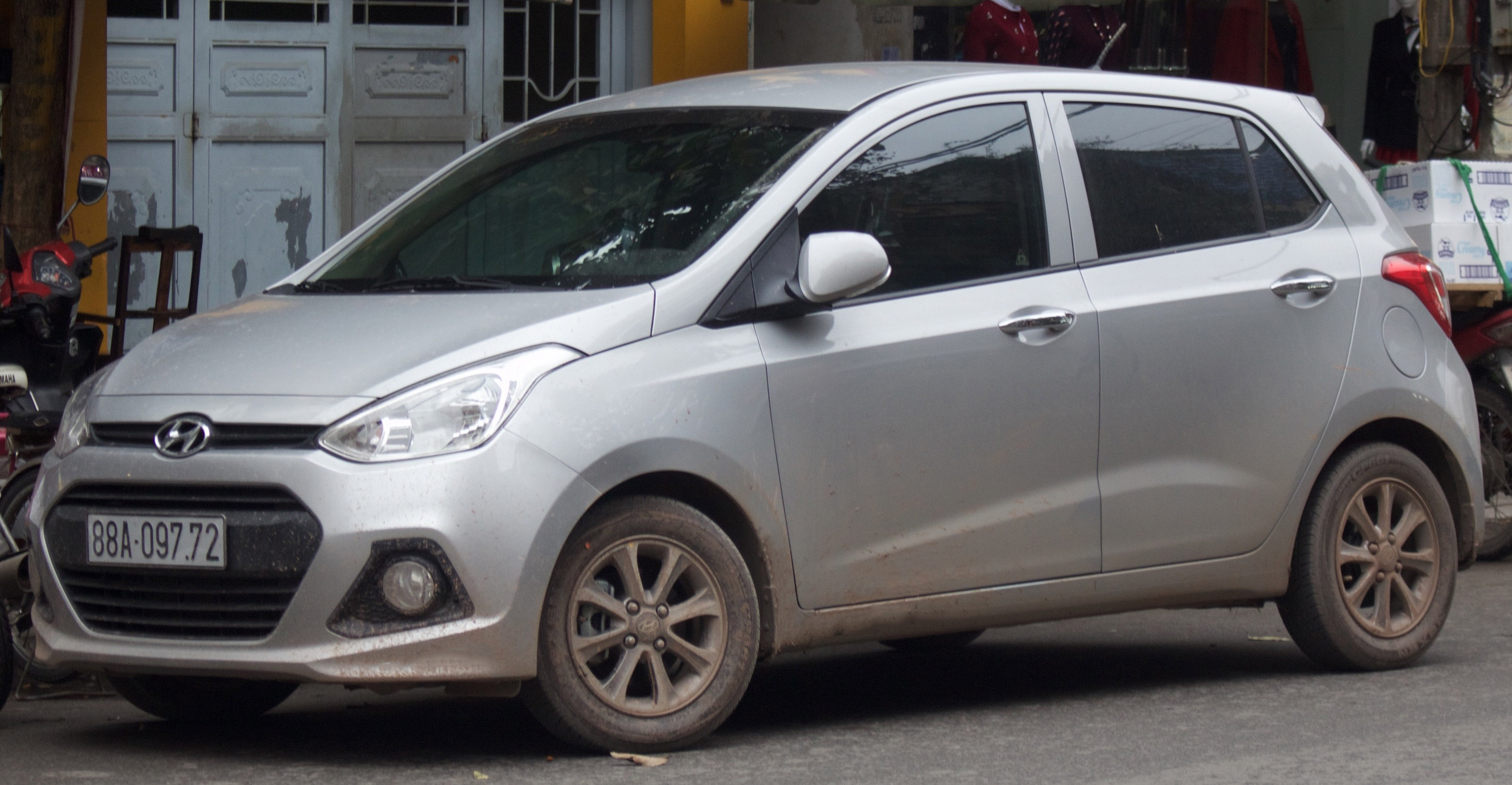
Hyundai Grand i10 (BA)

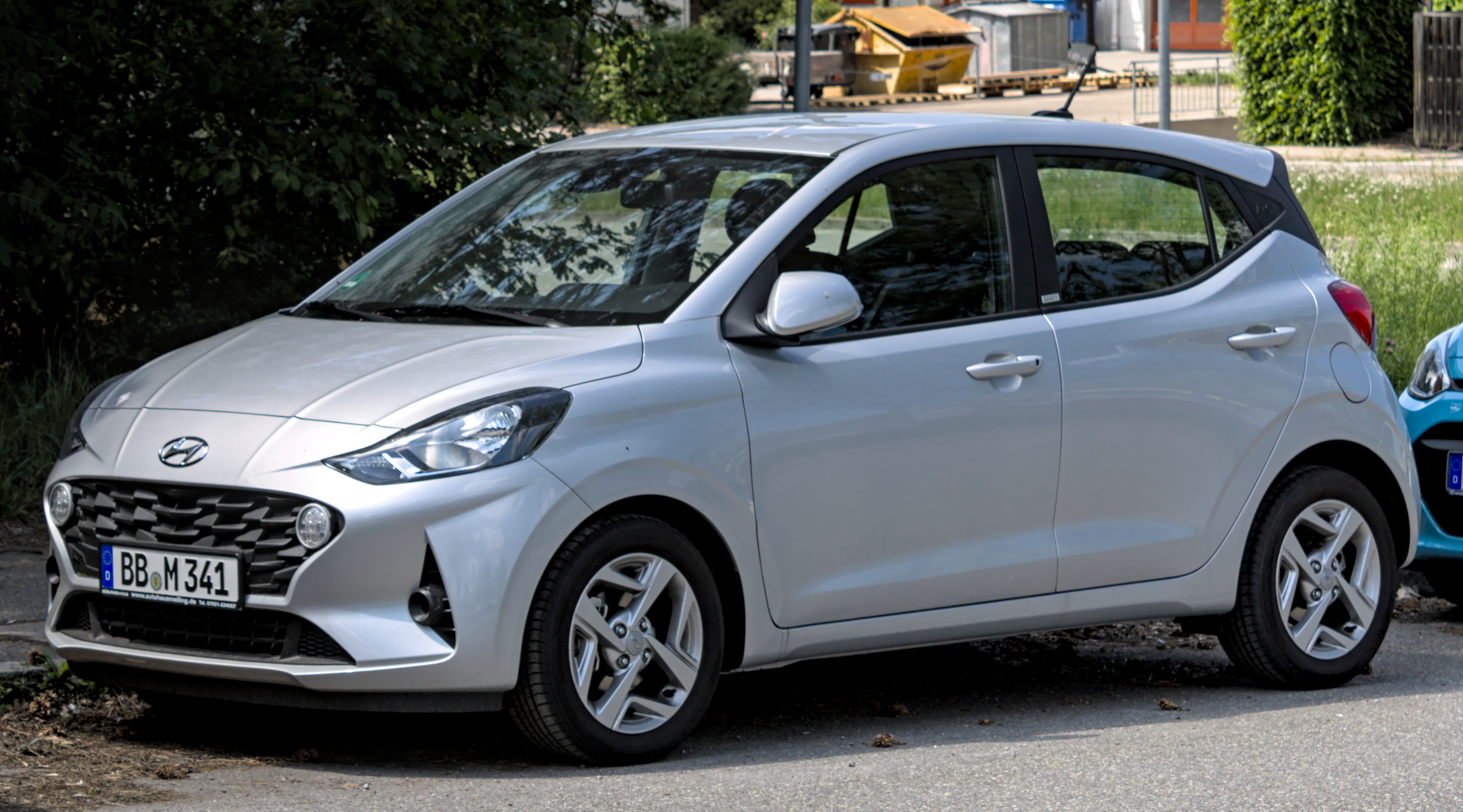
Hyundai i10 (AC3)

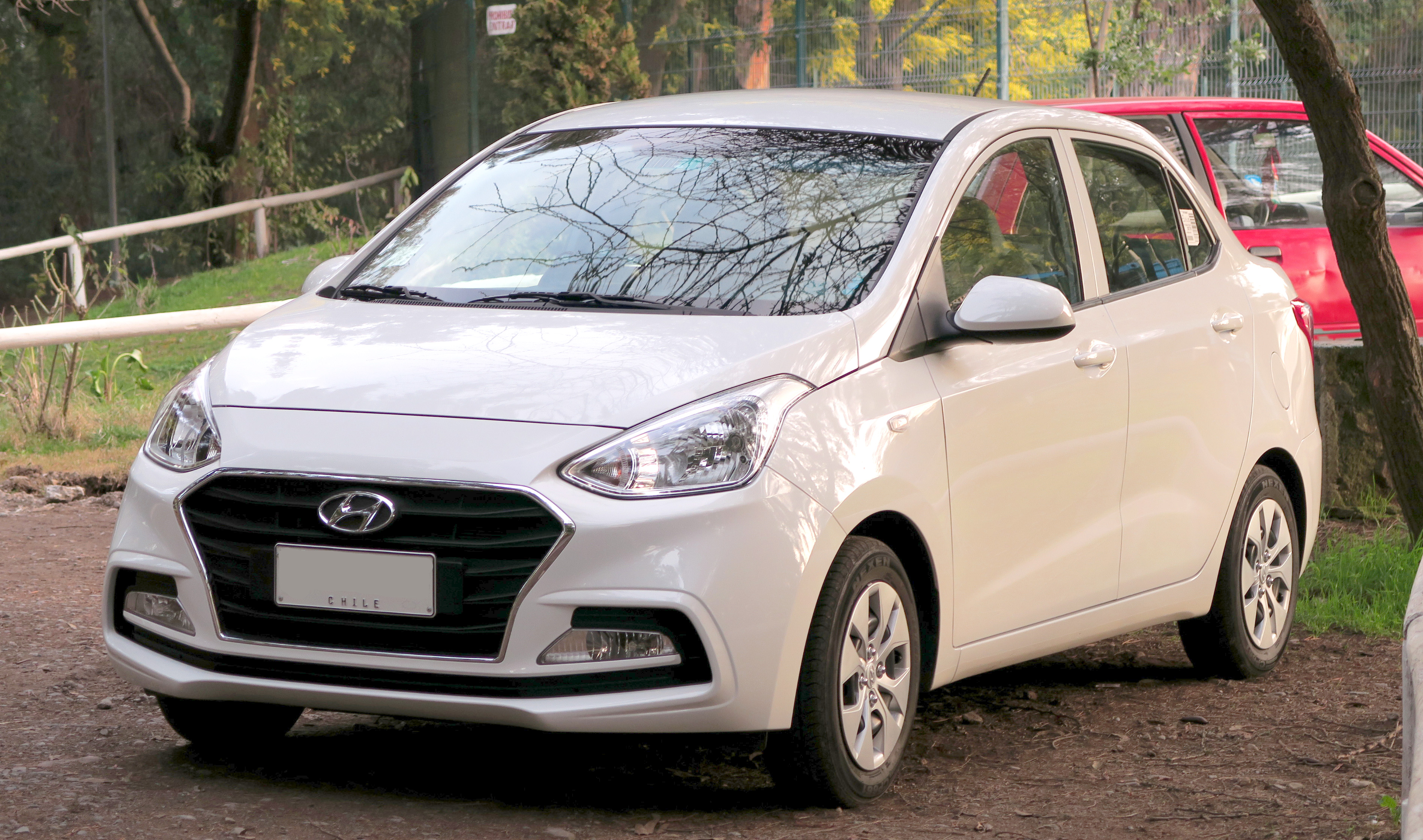
Hyundai Grand i10 sedan (IA)

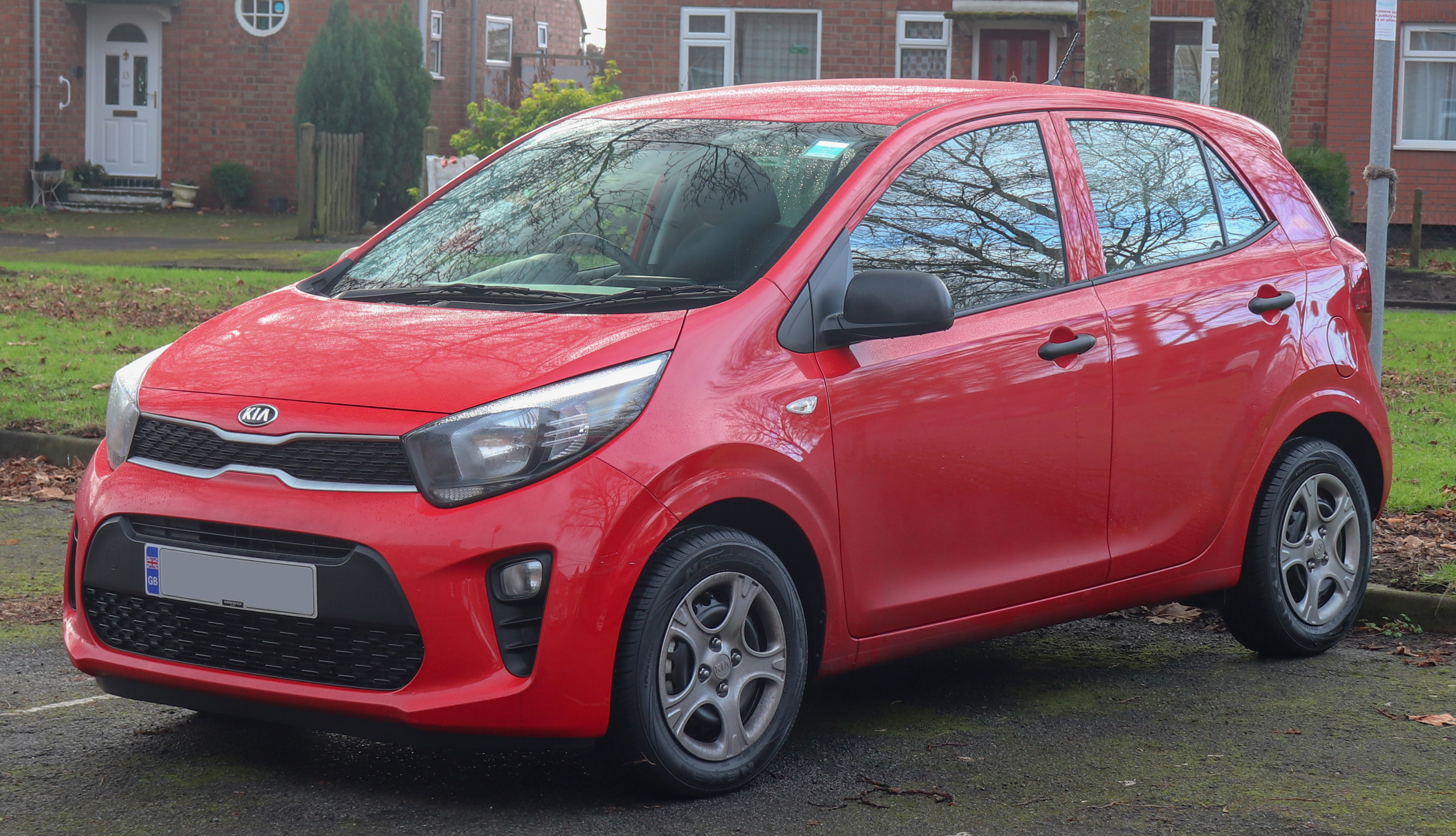
Kia Picanto (JA)

== LC platform ==
- Hyundai Accent/Verna (LC) (1999–2005)
- Hyundai Getz/Click (TB) (2002–2011)
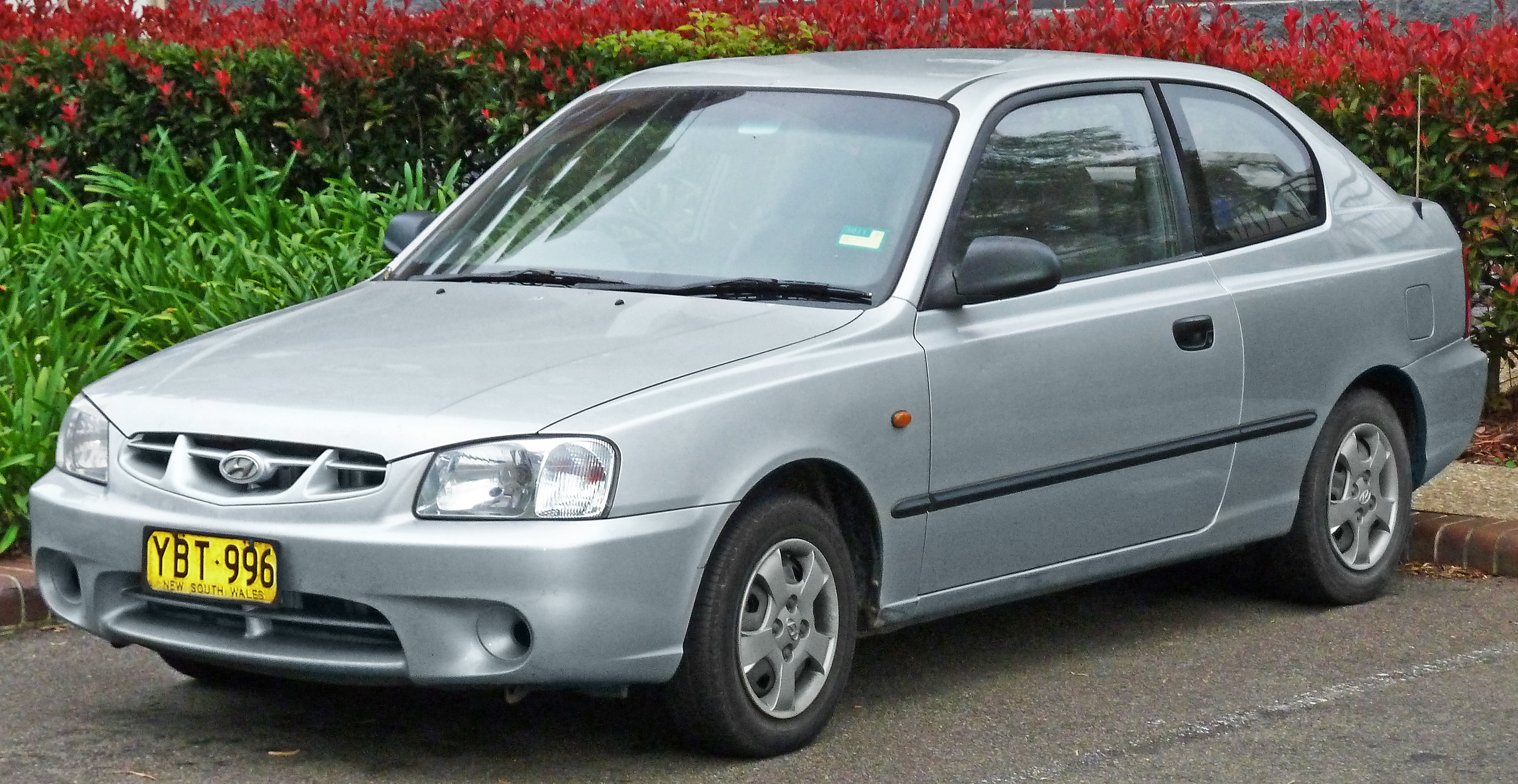
Hyundai Accent (LC)

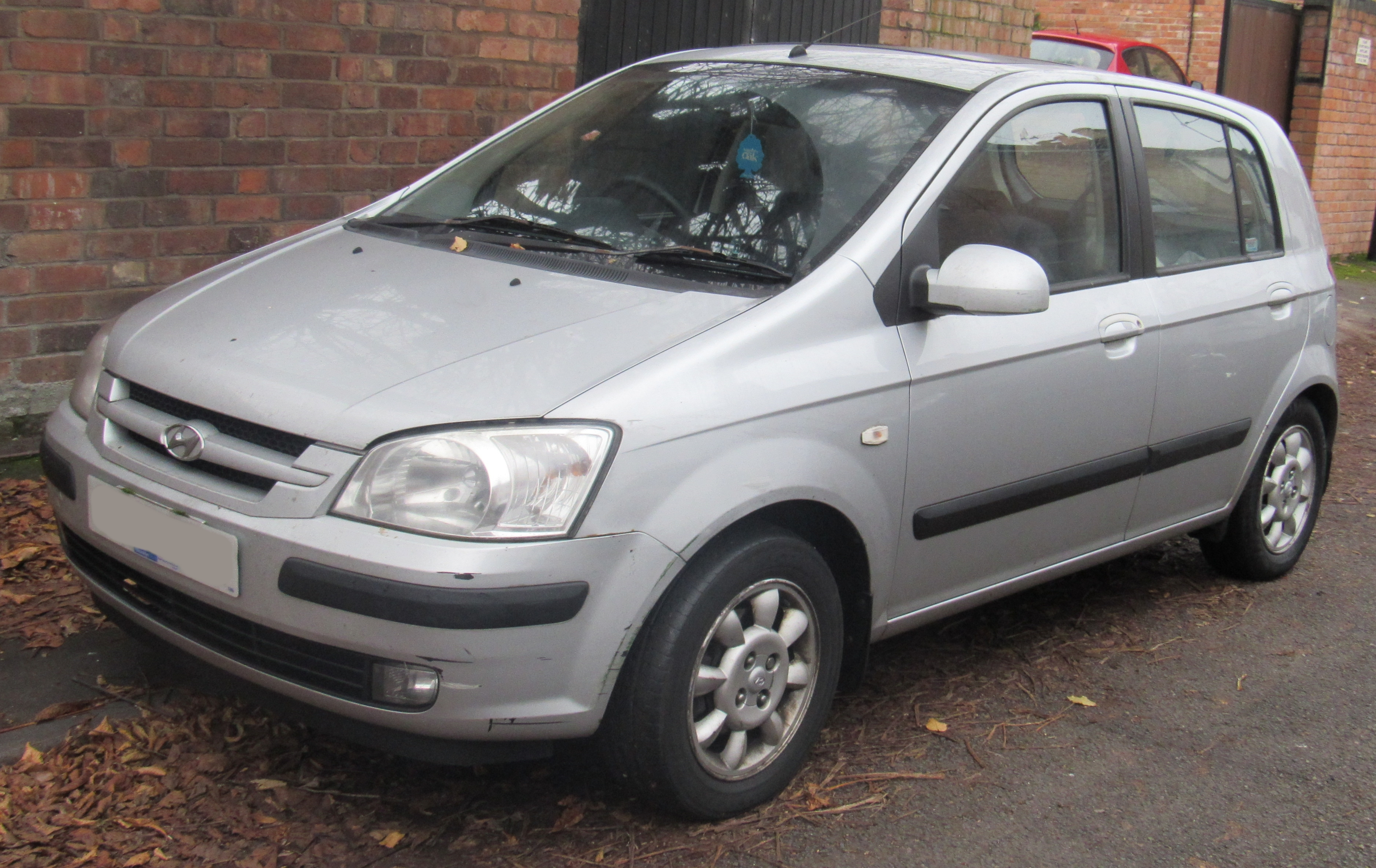
Hyundai Getz (TB)

== JB platform ==
The JB platform is a successor of the LC platform, mainly utilized for B-segment vehicles starting from 2005.

- Hyundai Accent/Verna (MC) (2005–2011)
- Kia Rio/Pride (JB) (2005–2011)
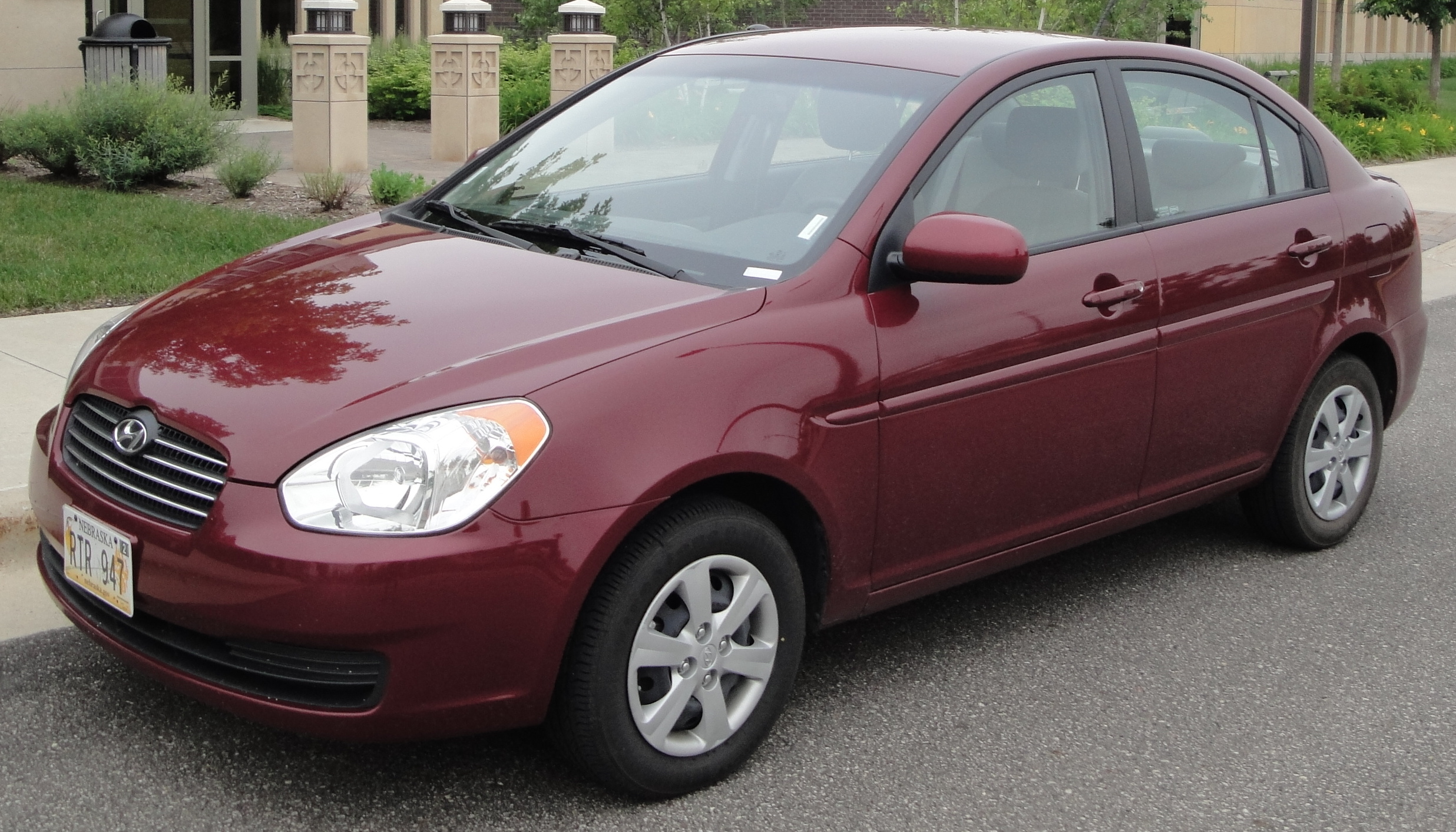
Hyundai Accent (MC)

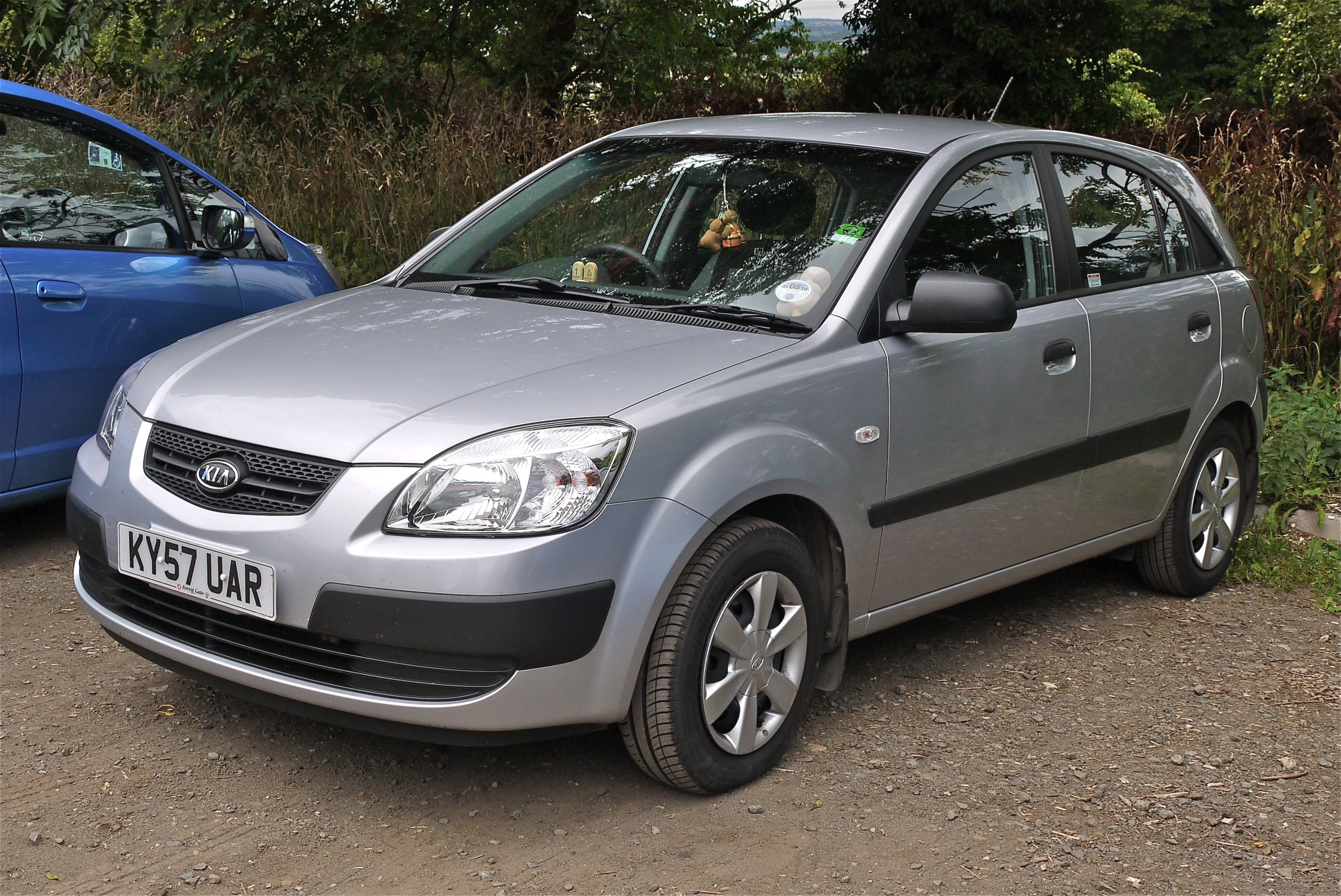
Kia Rio (JB)

== PB platform ==
The PB platform is a successor of the JB platform, mainly utilized for B-segment vehicles, which debuted with the second-generation Hyundai i20 in 2008 and then with the Hyundai ix20 in 2010. Wheelbase variations ranging from 2,500 mm (98.4 in) to 2,650 mm (104.3 in).

- Hyundai Accent/Verna/Solaris (RB) (2010–2017)
- Hyundai Creta/ix25 (GS) (2015–2019)
- Hyundai HB20 (HB) (2012–2019)
- Hyundai HB20 (BR2) (2019–present)
- Hyundai i20 (PB) (2008–2014)
- Hyundai i20 (IB) (2014–2020)
- Hyundai ix20 (JC) (2010–2019)
- Hyundai Reina (CB) (2017–2021)
- Hyundai Veloster (FS) (2011–2019)
- Kia KX3 (KC) (2015–2019)
- Kia Pegas/Soluto (AB) (2017–present)
- Kia Rio/K2 (QB) (2011–2017)
- Kia Rio/Pride (UB) (2011–2017)
- Kia Soul (AM) (2009–2014)
- Kia Venga (YN) (2009–2019)
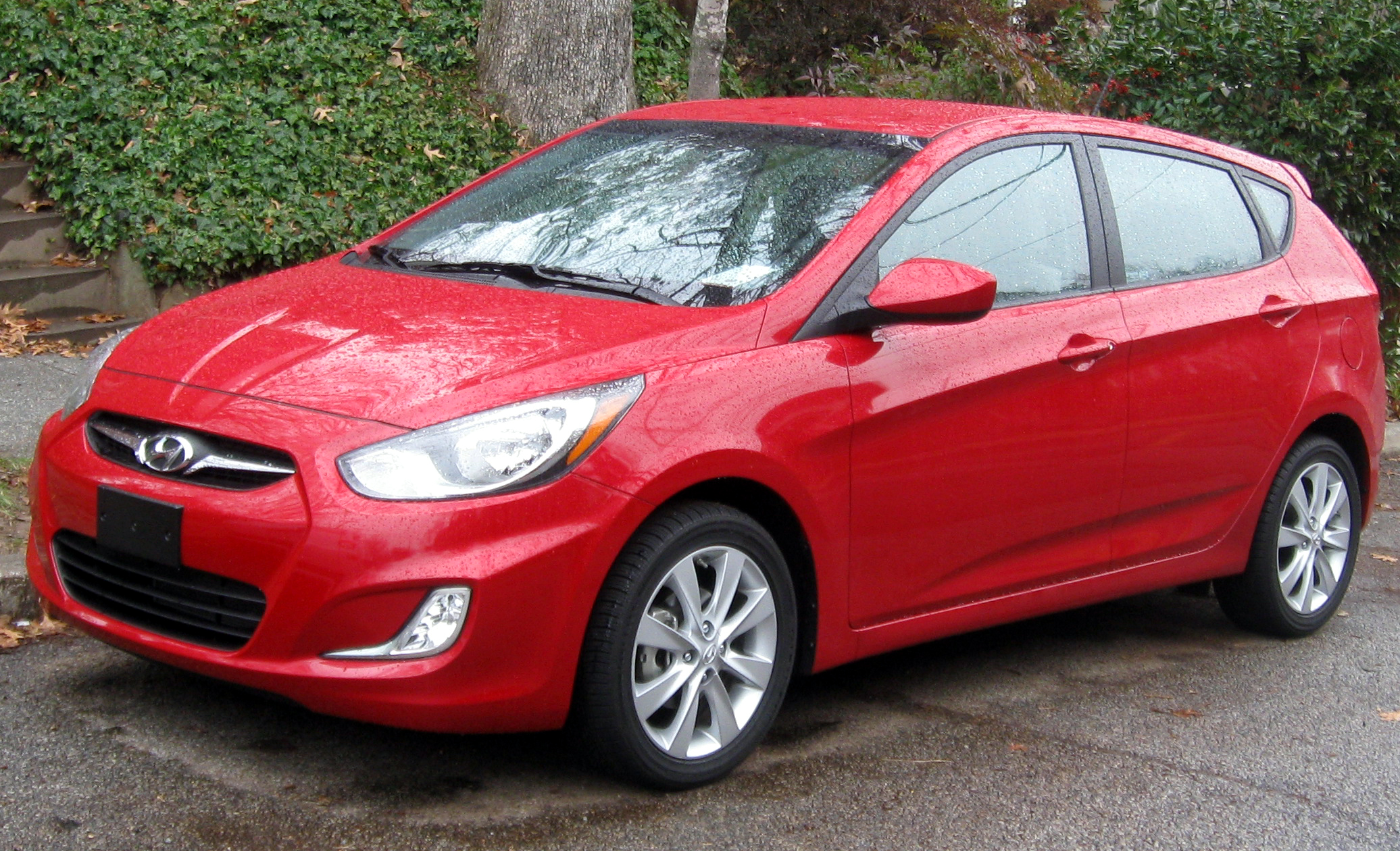
Hyundai Accent (RB)

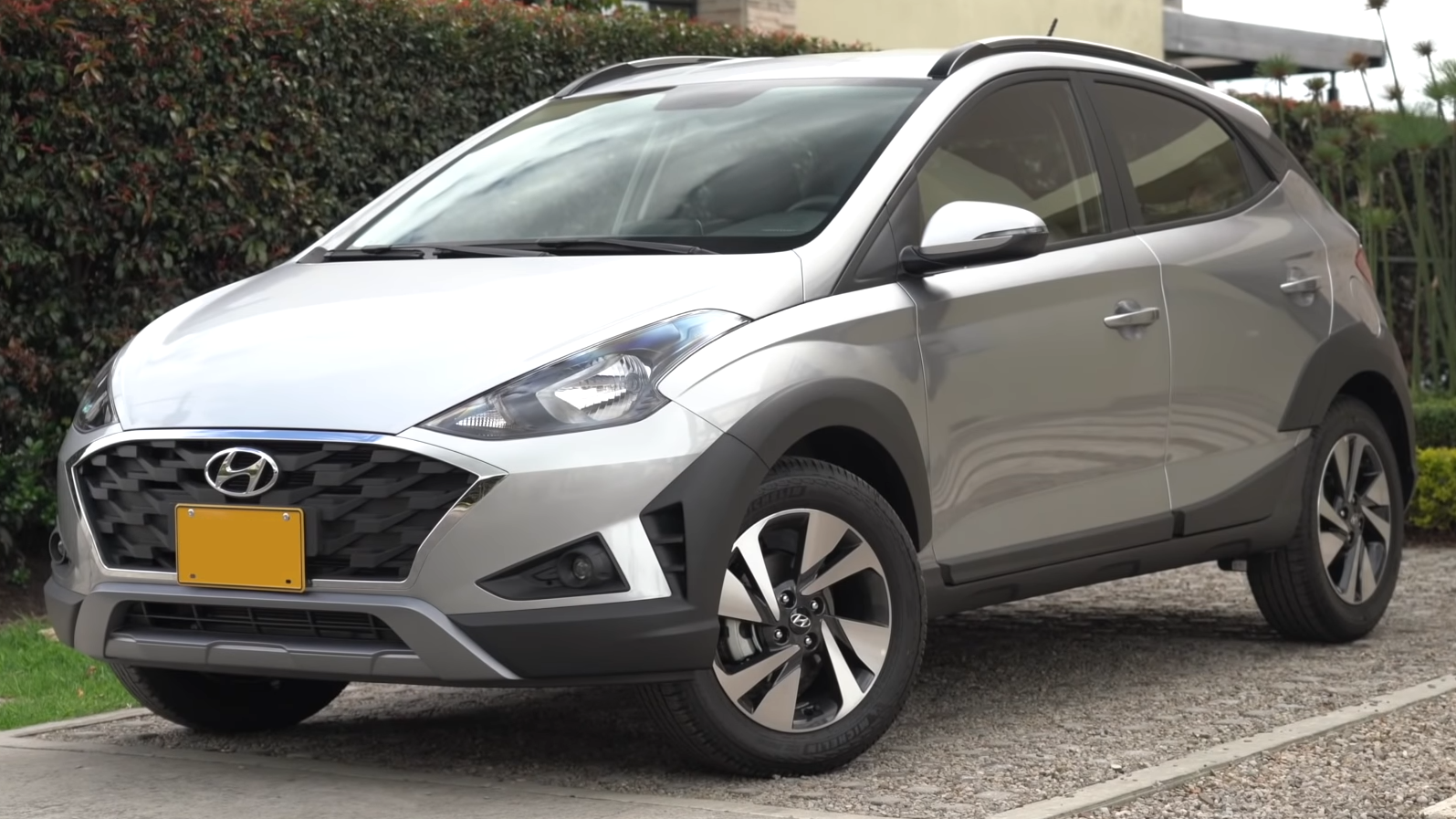
Hyundai HB20 (BR2)

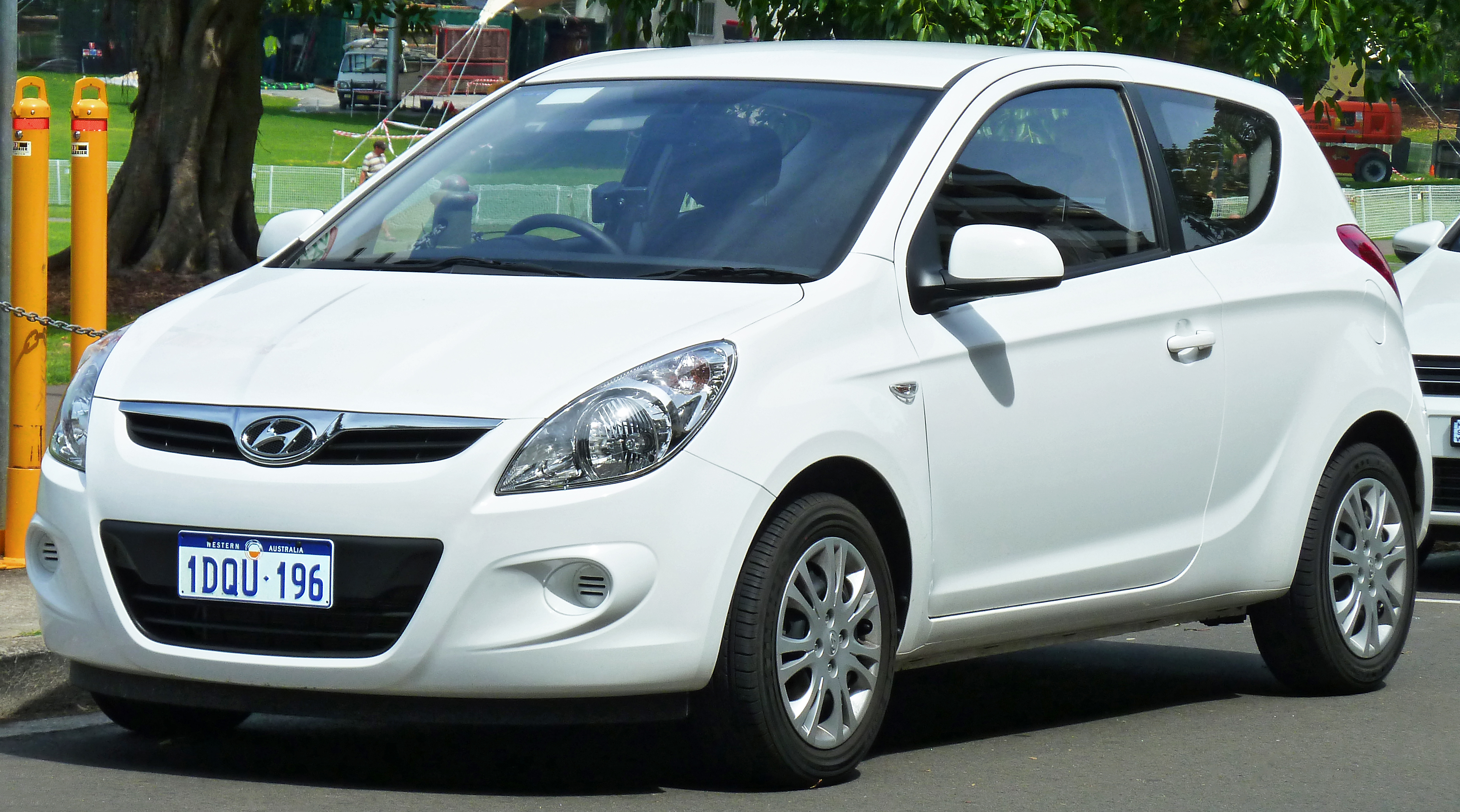
Hyundai i20 (PB)

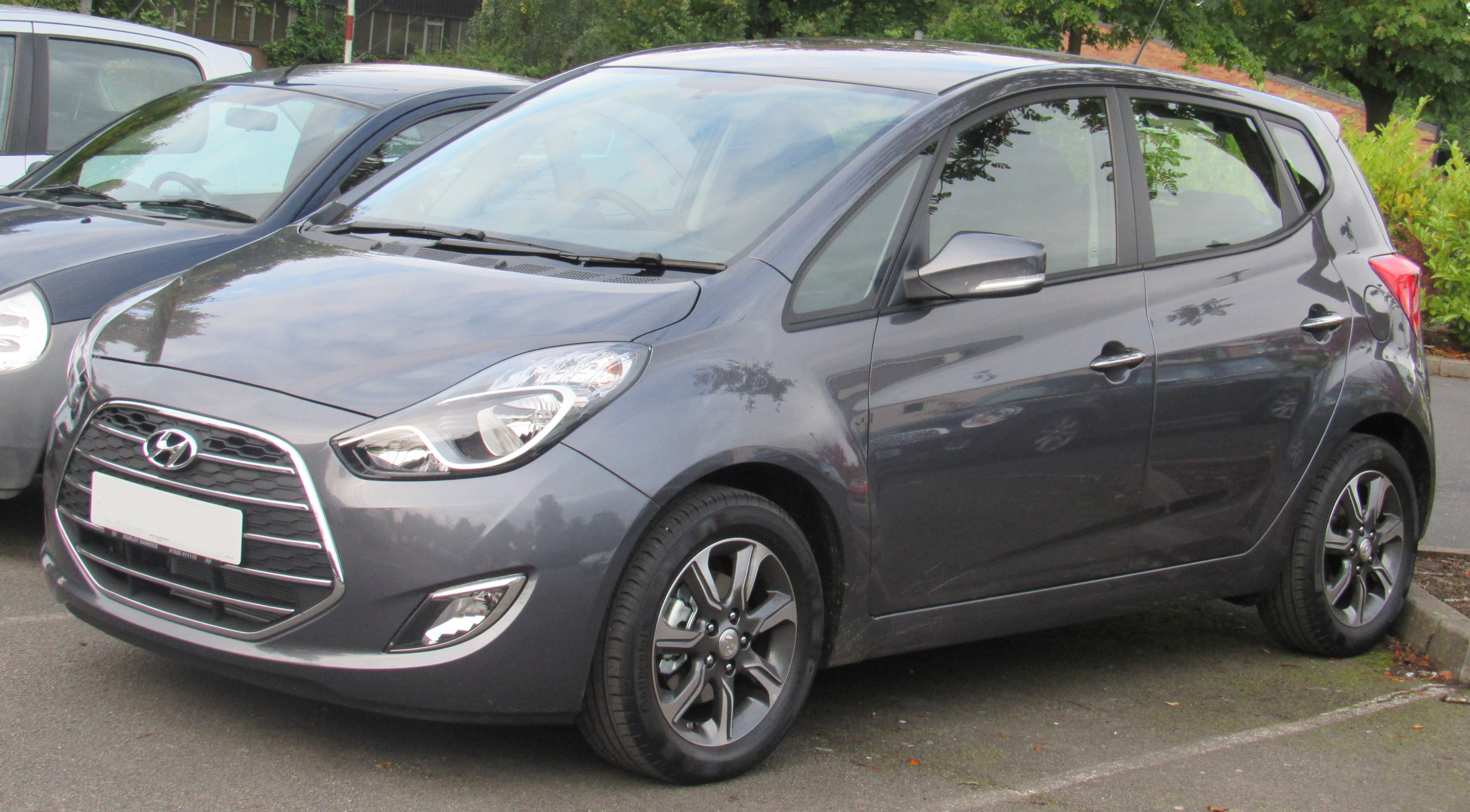
Hyundai ix20 (JC)

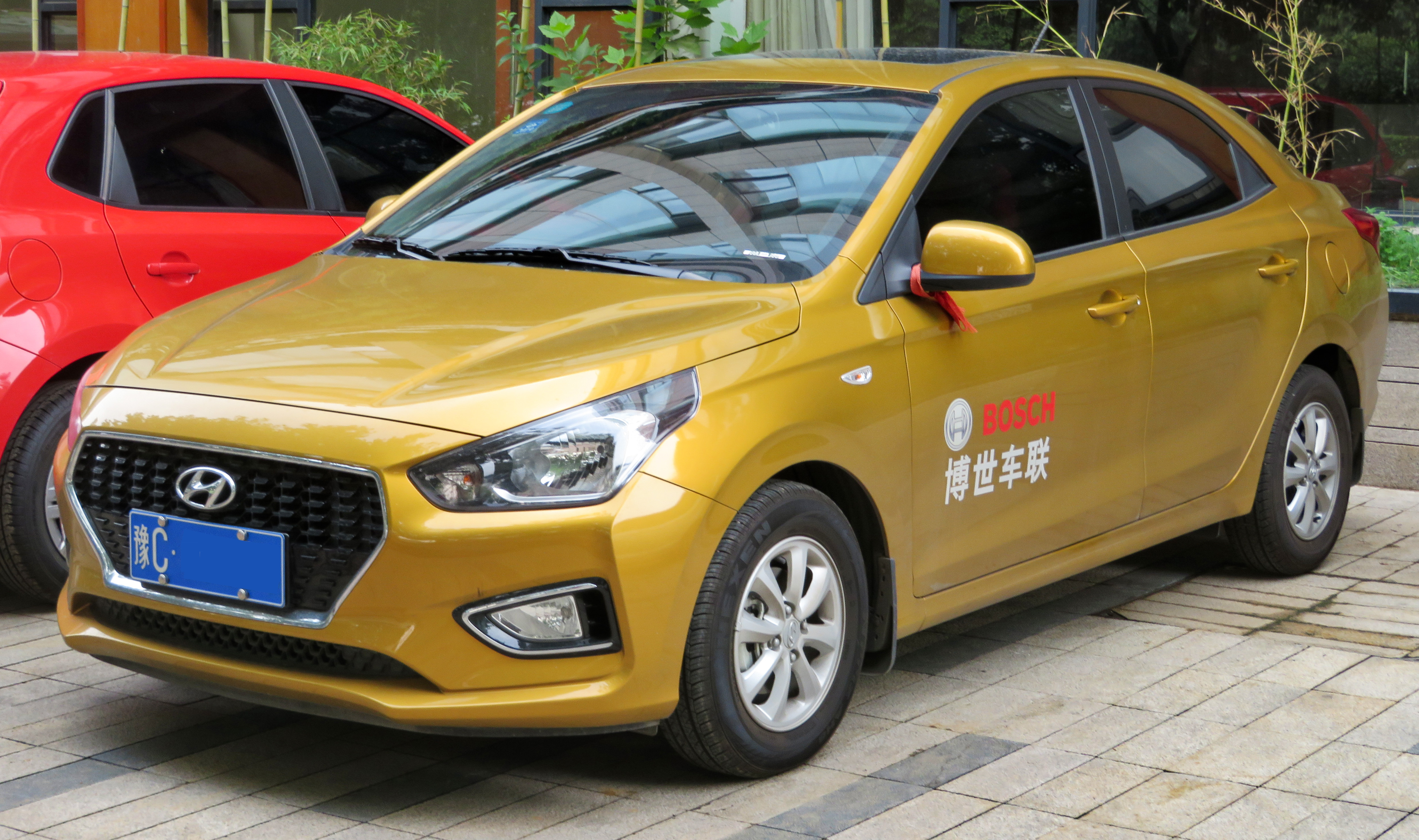
Hyundai Reina (CB)

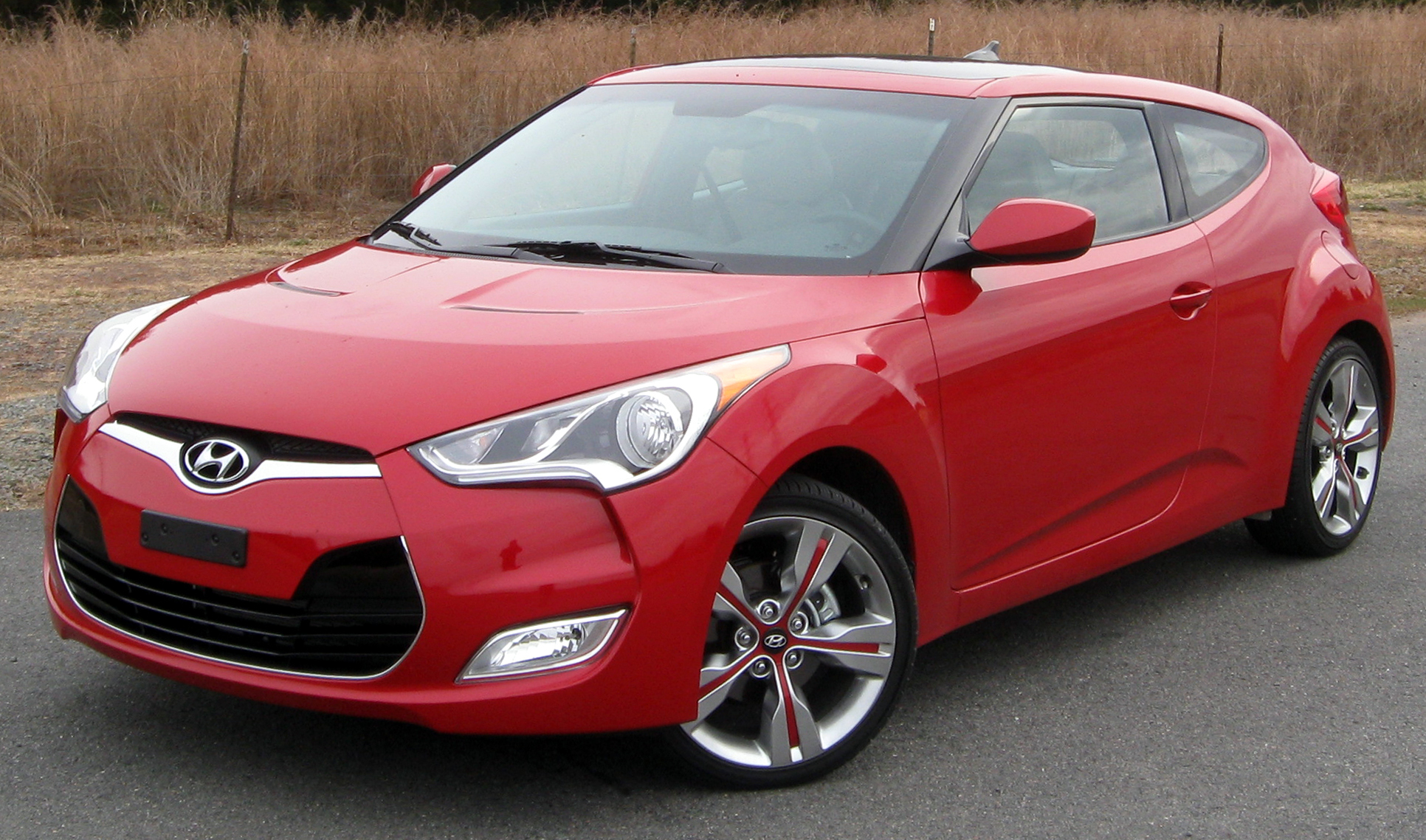
Hyundai Veloster (FS)

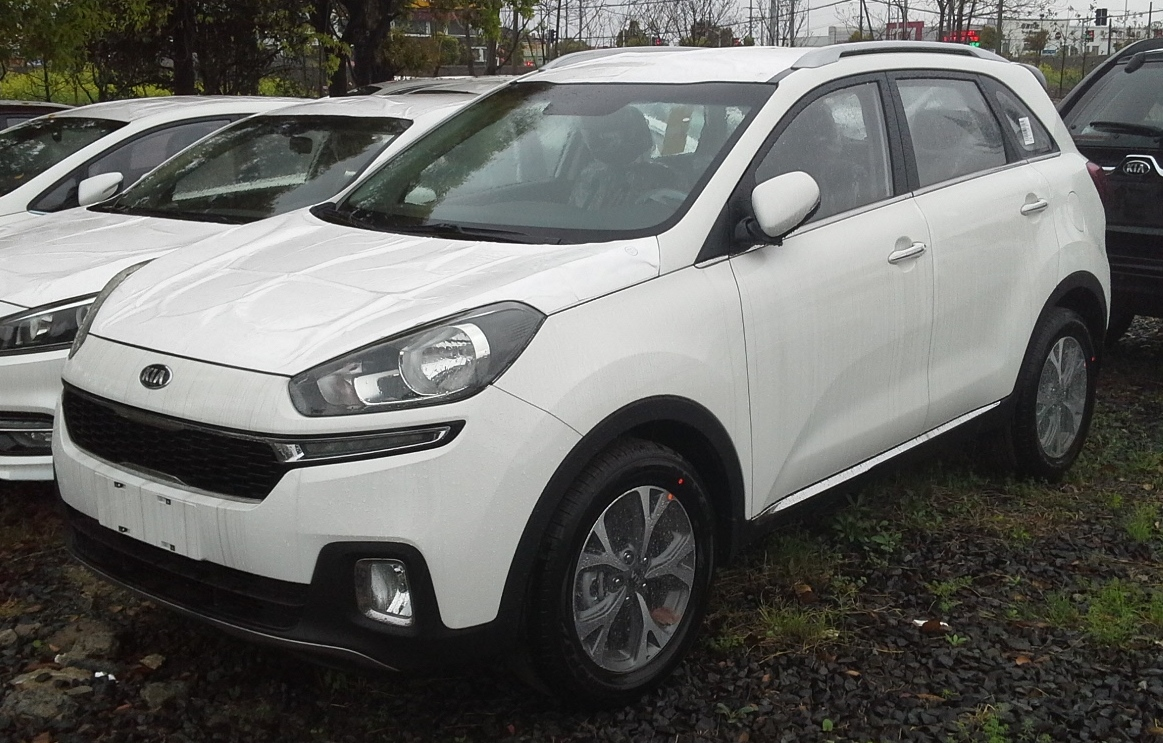
Kia KX3 (KC)

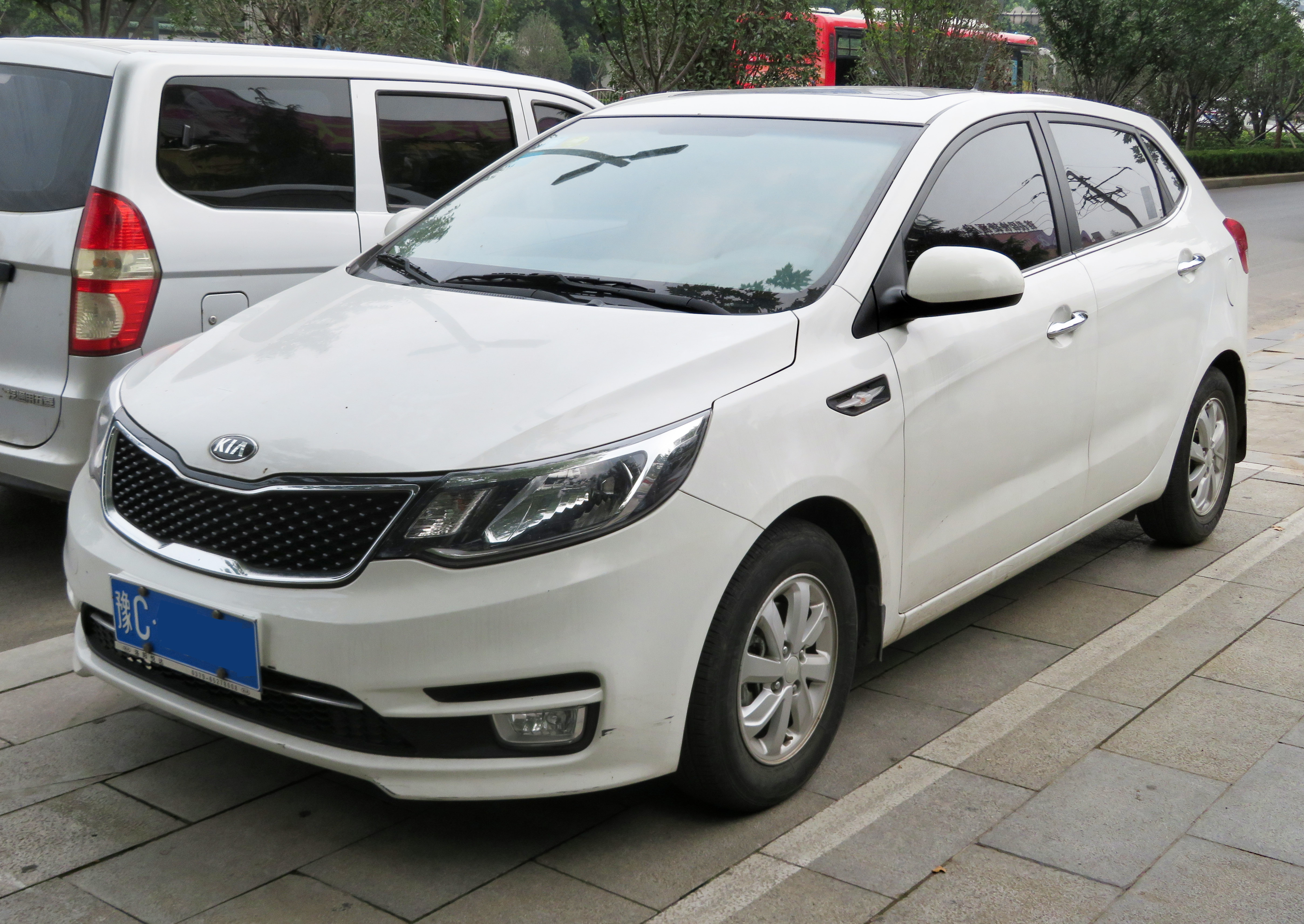
Kia K2 (QB)

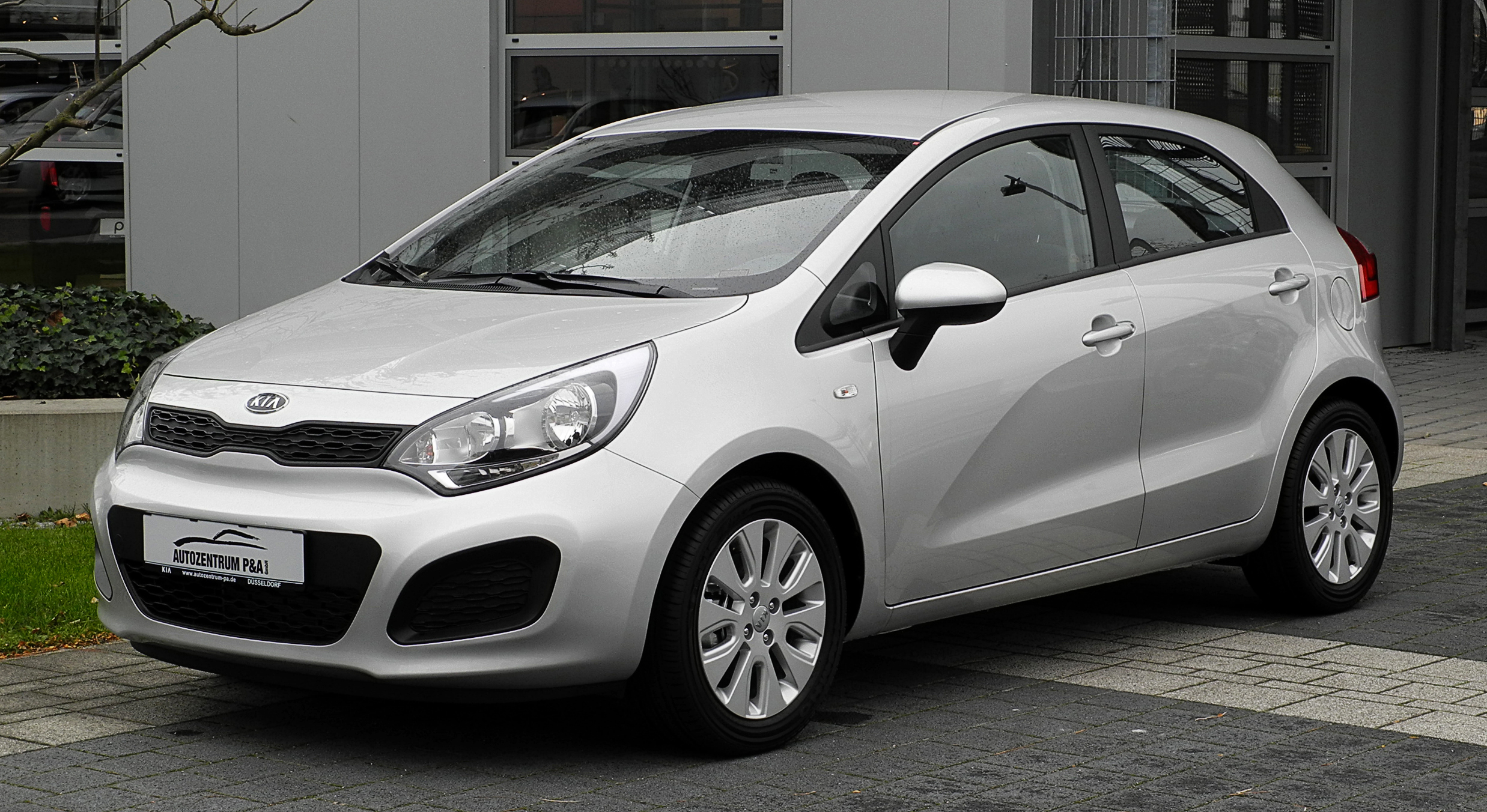
Kia Rio (UB)

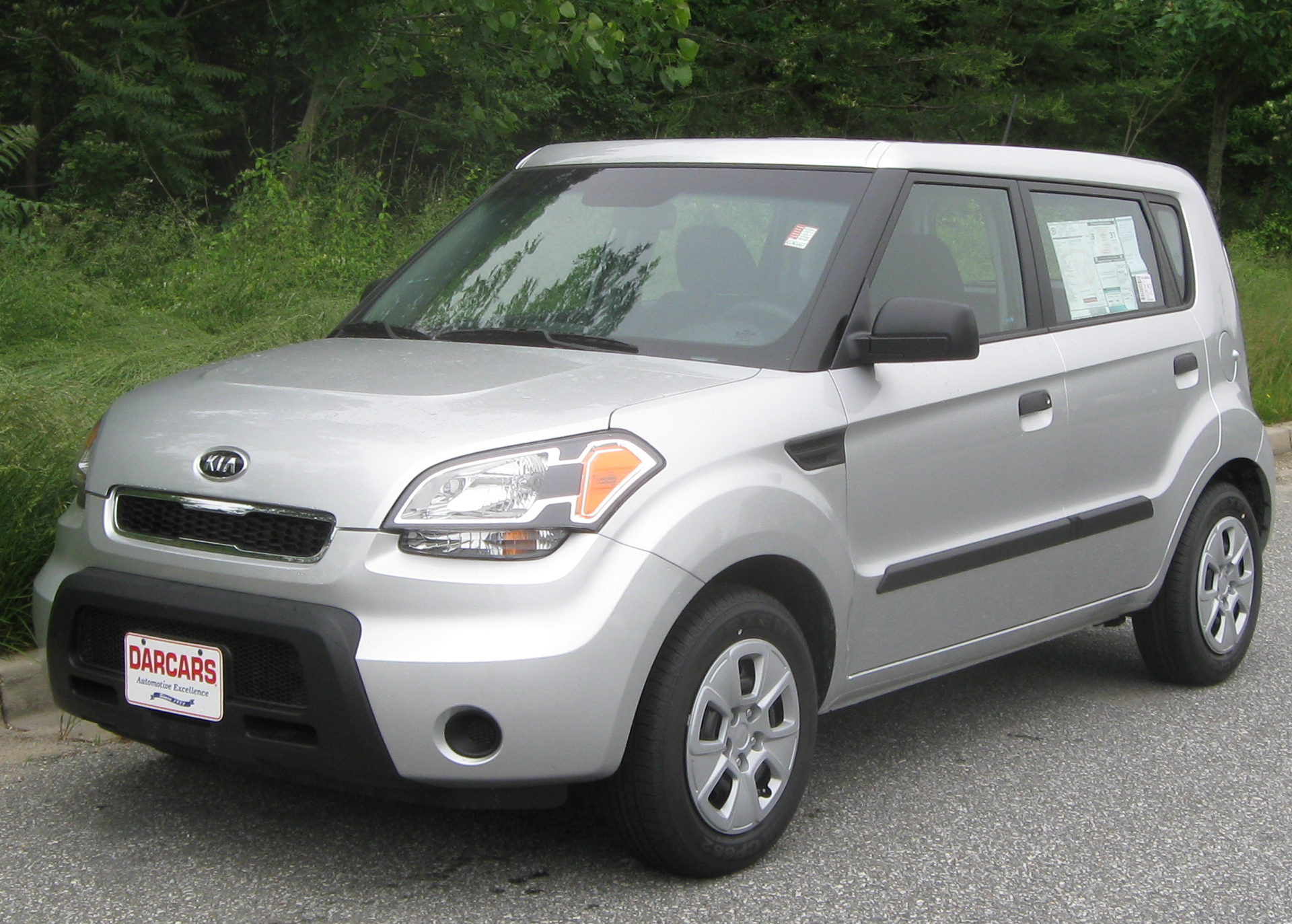
Kia Soul (AM)

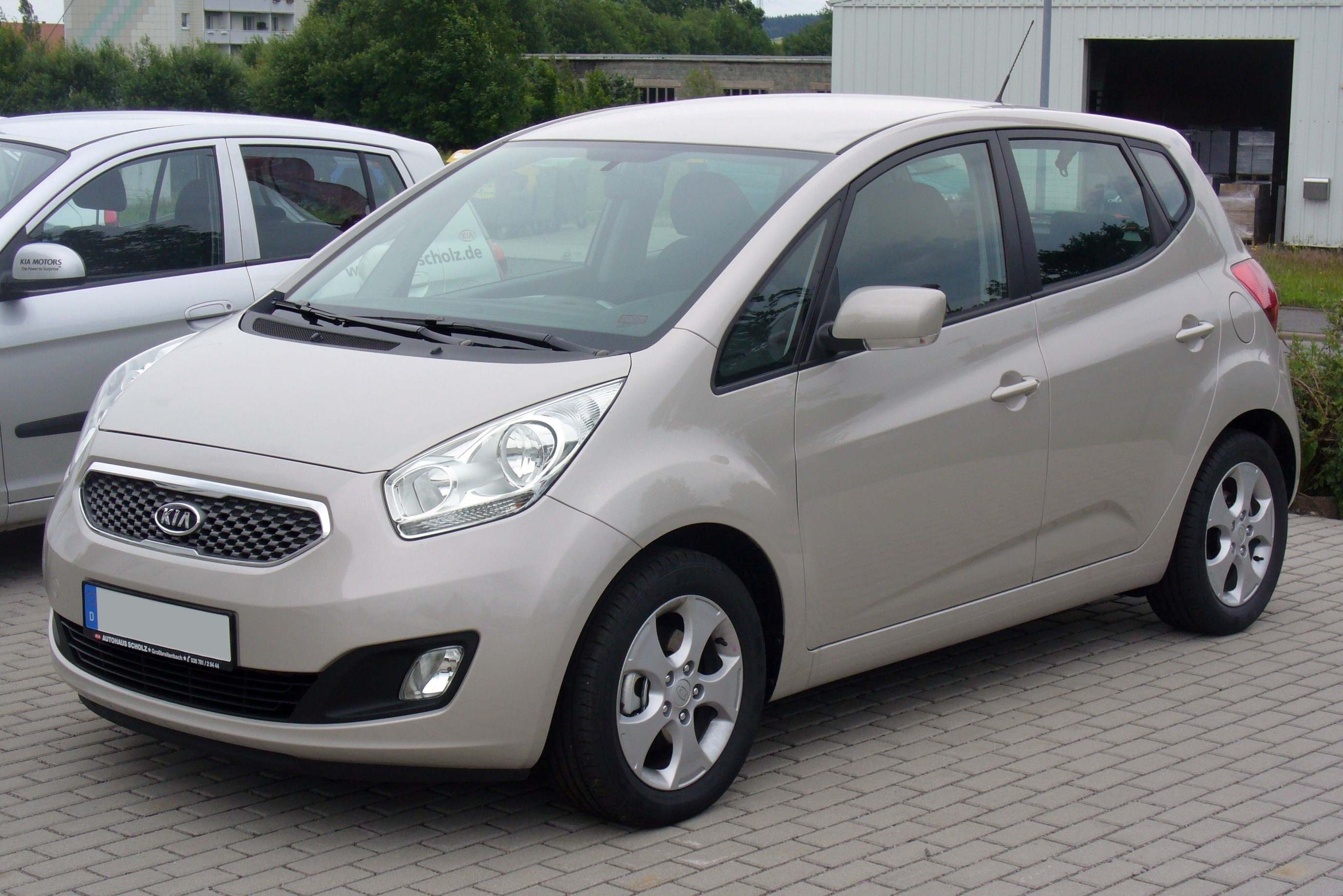
Kia Venga (YN)

== GB platform ==
The GB platform is a successor to the PB platform, mainly utilized for B-segment vehicles. Wheelbase variations range from 2,520 mm (99.2 in) to 2,630 mm (103.5 in). It is succeeded by the K2 platform.

- Hyundai i20 (GB) (2014–2020)
- Kia Rio (YB) (2017–2023)
- Kia Soul (SK3) (2018–2025)
- Kia Stonic/KX1 (YB CUV) (2018–present)
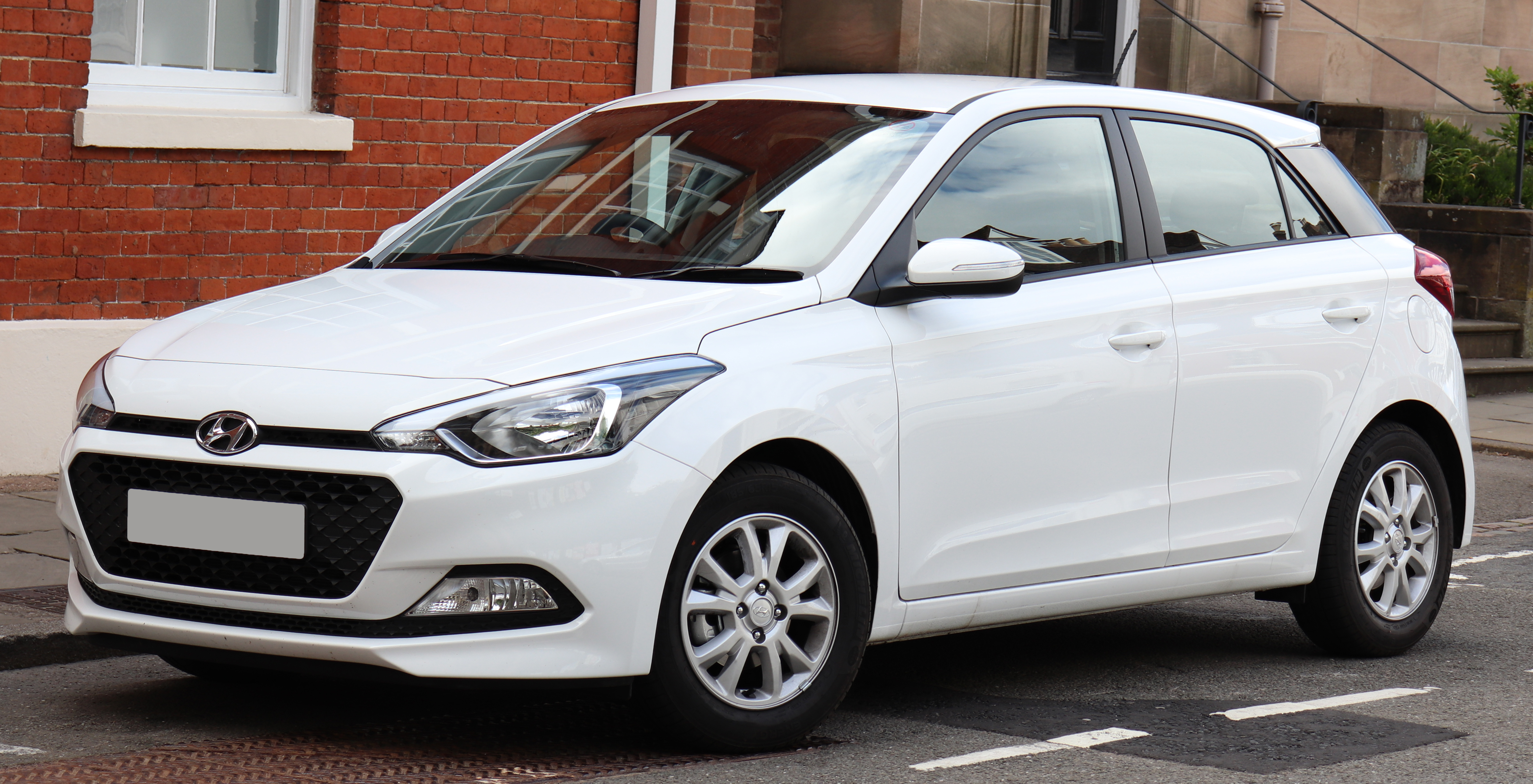
Hyundai i20 (GB)

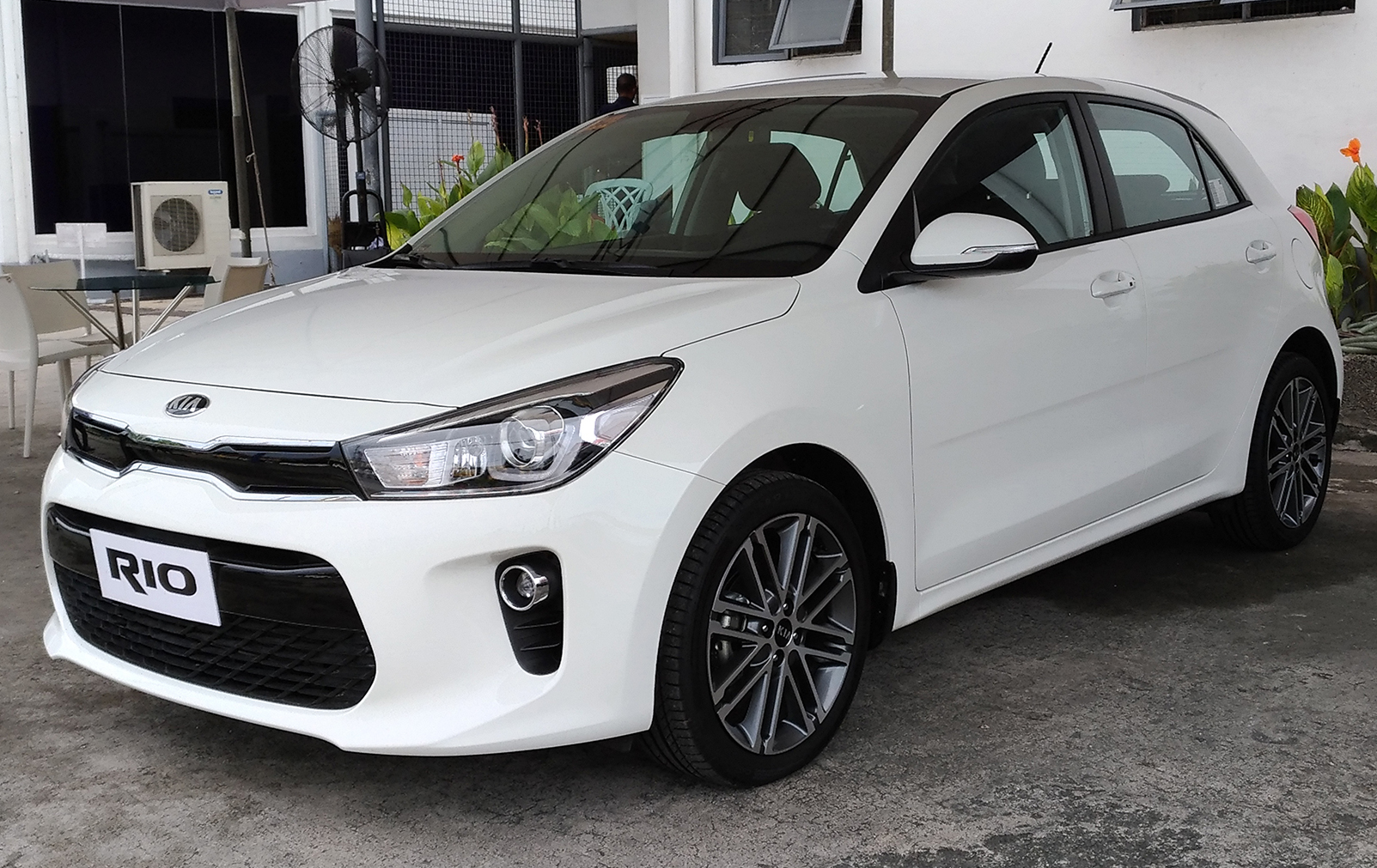
Kia Rio (YB)

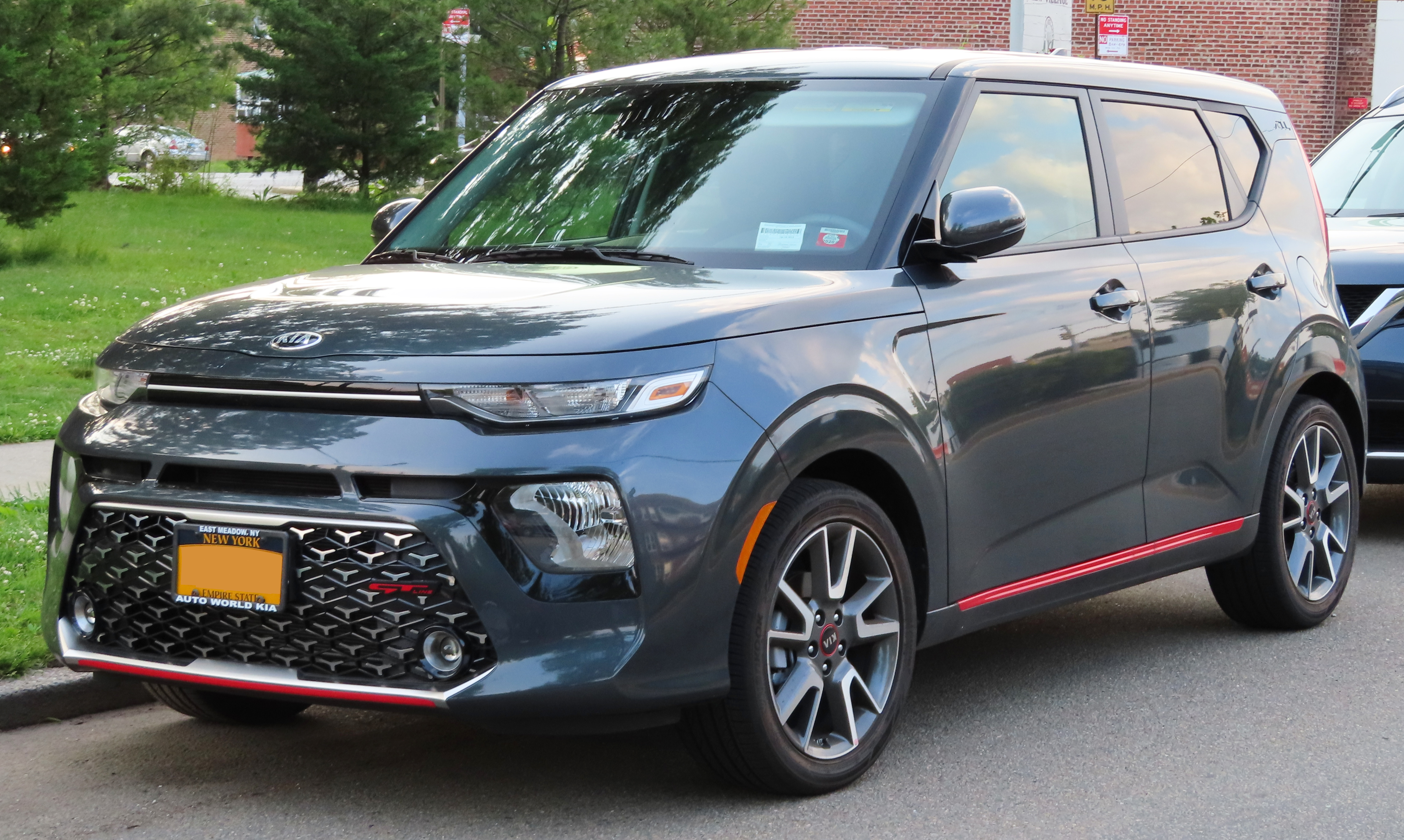
Kia Soul (SK3)

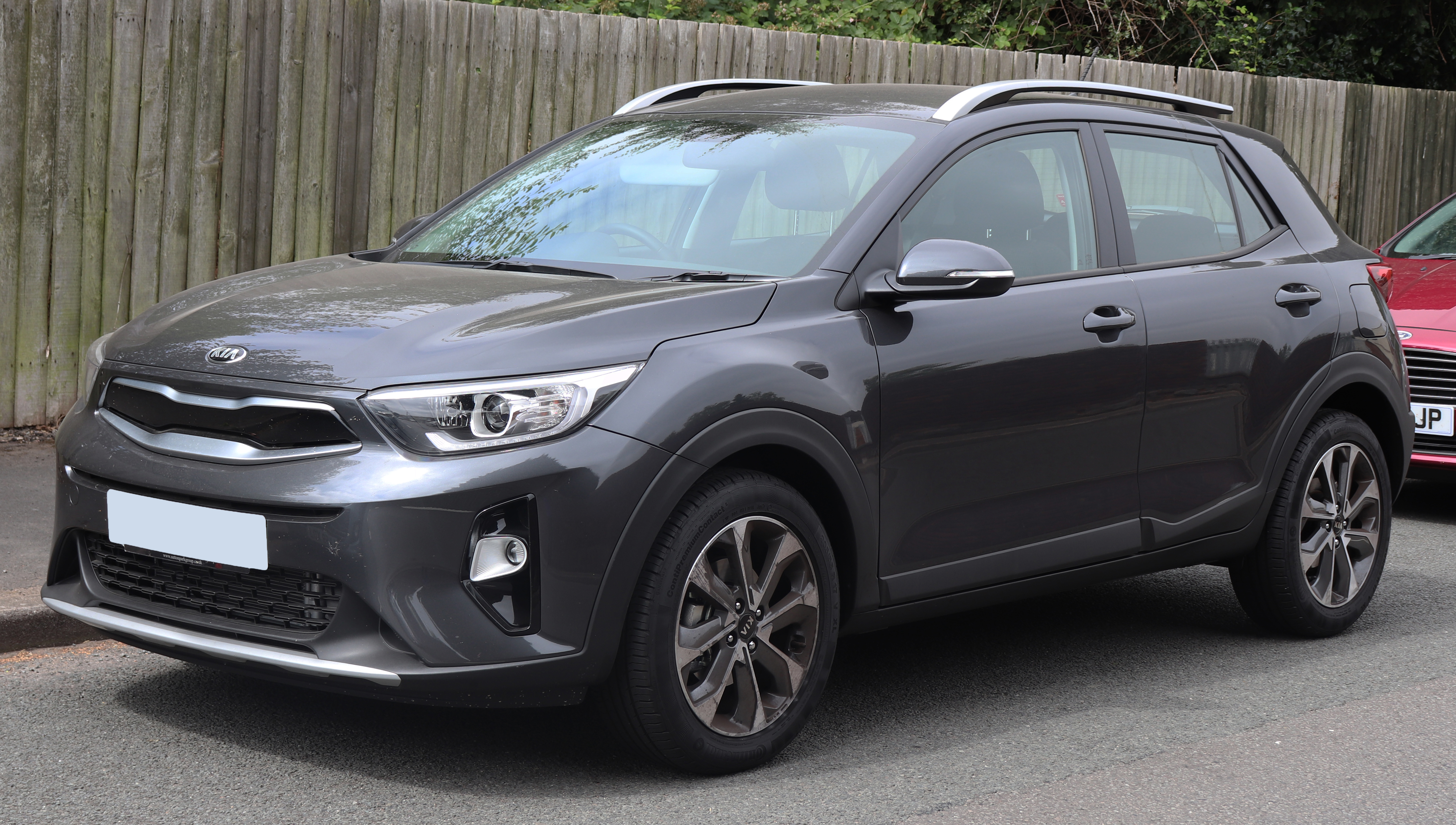
Kia Stonic (YB CUV)

== B-SUV platform (2017) ==
The all-new B-SUV platform debuted with the Hyundai Kona in 2017. The all-new platform is said to be based on the Hyundai i30 platform, and is claimed to extensively using advanced high-strength steel. The architecture supports electrified variants, and unlike the GB platform, the new platform supports an all-wheel-drive drivetrain with dual-arm multi-link independent rear suspension.

- Hyundai Kona (OS) (2017–2023)
- Kia Seltos (SP2) (2019–present)
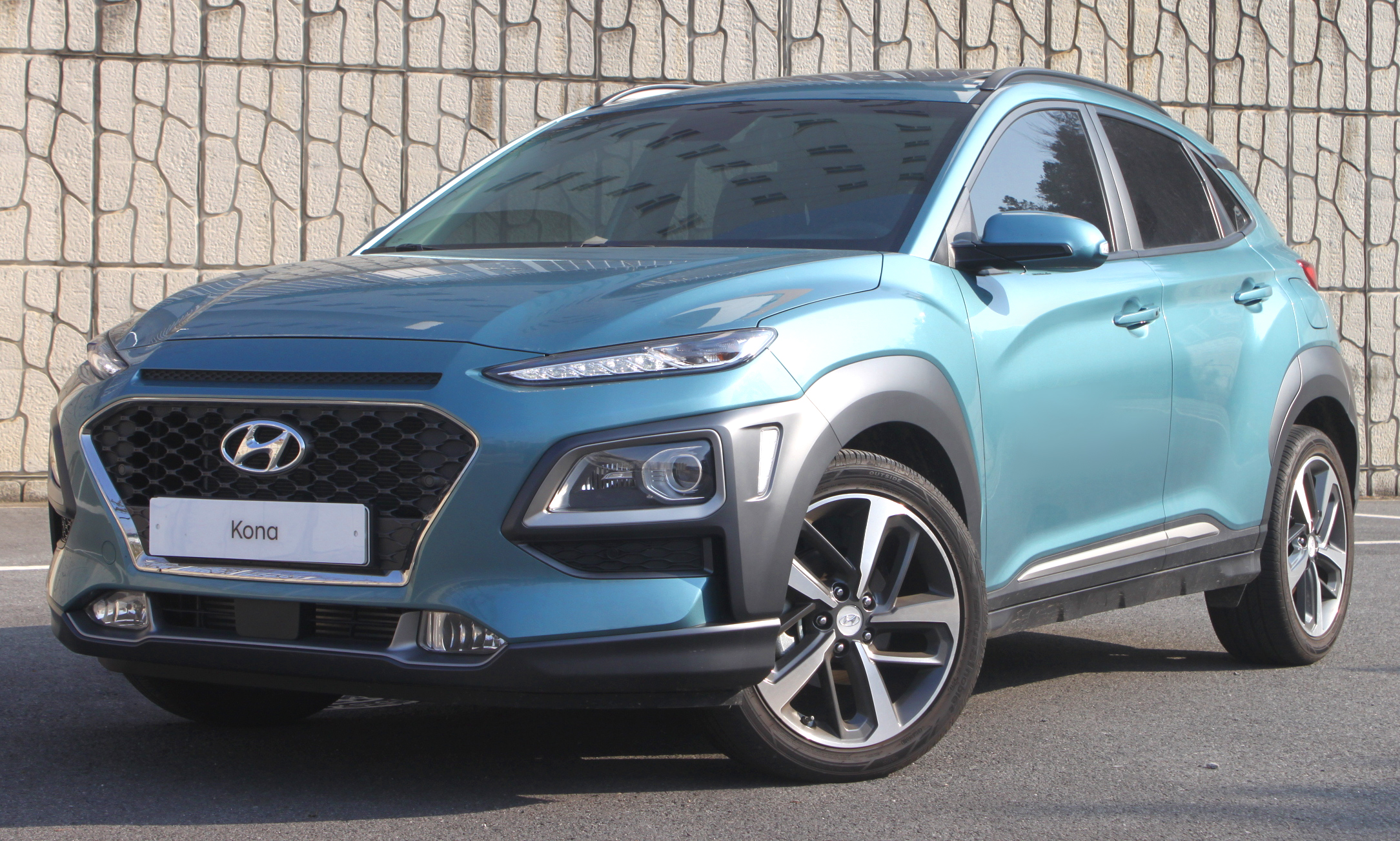
Hyundai Kona (OS)

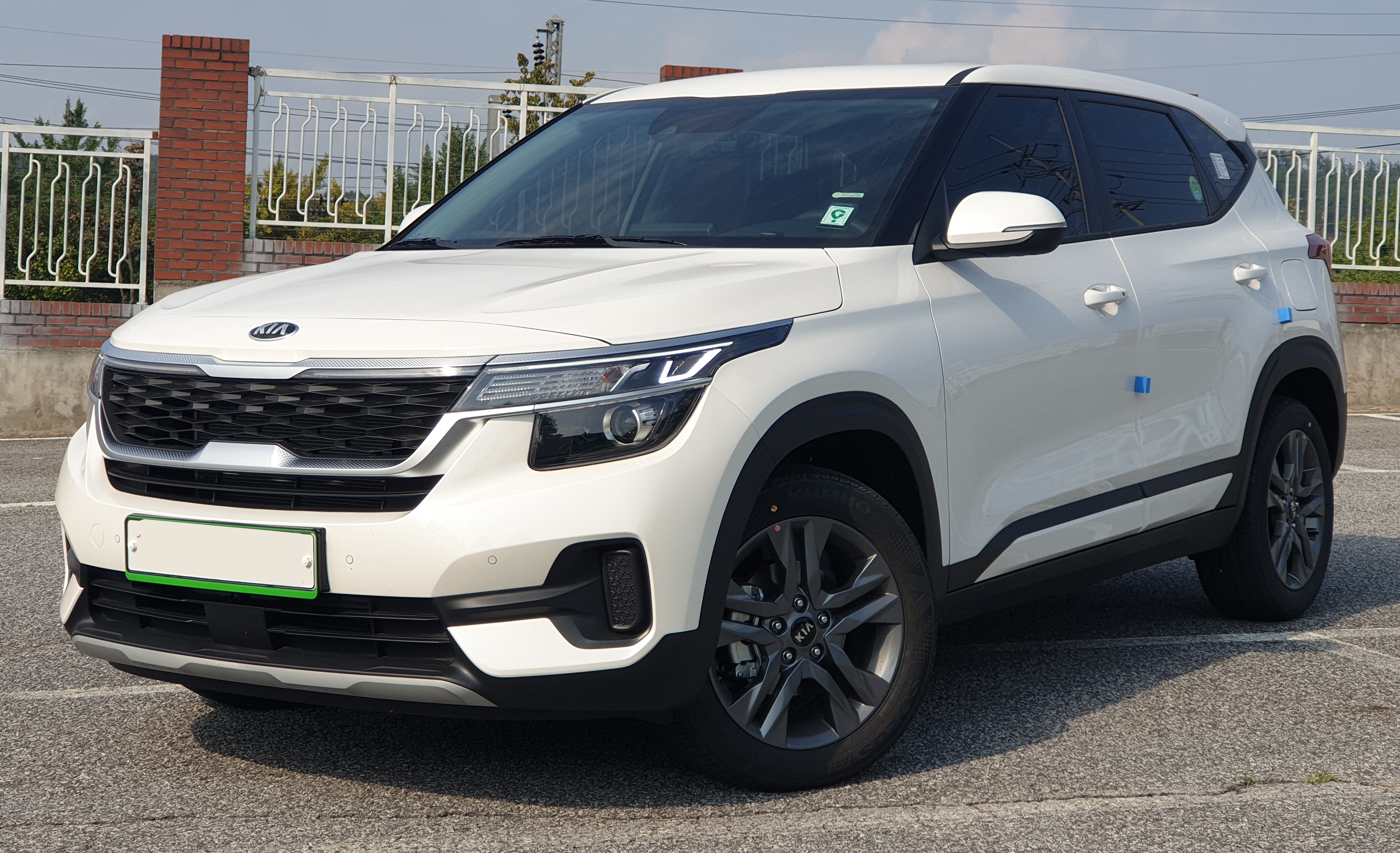
Kia Seltos (SP2)
