= List of Kia design and manufacturing facilities =

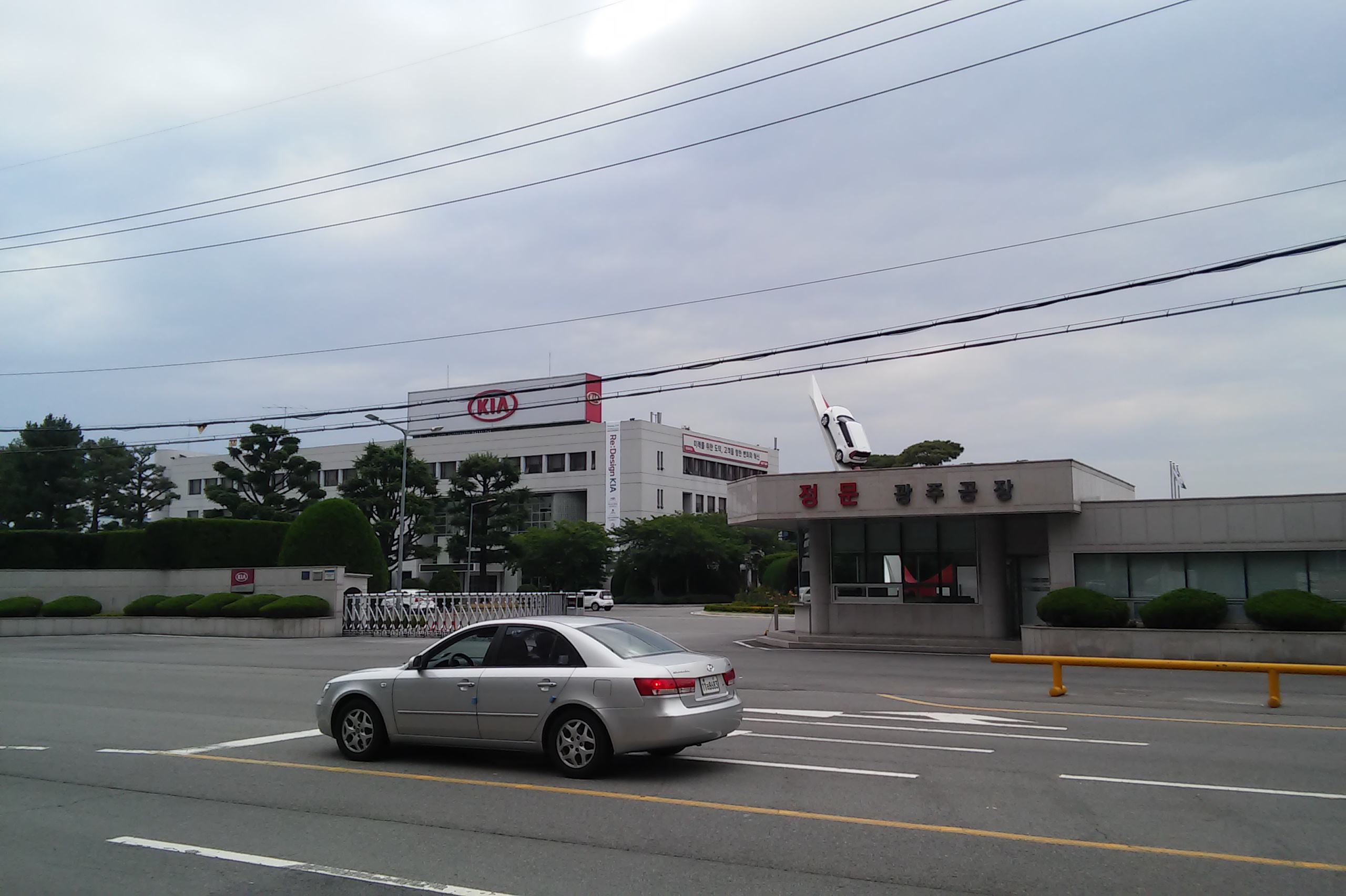
Kia Motors is a South Korean automobile manufacturer, with a production output of 2 million vehicles per year. Pictured is the Gwangju Plant.

South Korean automobile manufacturer Kia maintains 14 manufacturing facilities in eight countries along with research centres in South Korea, the United States, Japan, and Germany. Kia has four manufacturing plants in South Korea and additional plants in China, India, Japan, Mexico, Slovakia, the United States and Vietnam.

== Design centers ==
=== Namyang Design Center ===
The Namyang Design Center, located in Hwaseong, South Korea, serves as Kia's primary design facility. The facility, which is shared with parent company Hyundai, is located on over 3.3 million square meters of land and serves as the central hub for engineering work encompassing the entire design process, from pre-design studies, prototyping and extensive track testing, and full-scale wind tunnel aerodynamic testing. to crash testing. Kia and Hyundai employees from around the world receive training at the Namyang Center.

- 37°9′30.16″N 126°49′7.44″E

=== Kia Design Center America ===
The Kia Design Center America in Irvine, California, is located on a 22 acres (8.9 ha) corporate campus with a $130 million initial investment, the Irvine, California Kia Design Center was designed by Skidmore, Owings & Merrill and was completed in 2008, featuring 45 workstations and nine offices. The studio can model up to eight vehicles at once and includes a computerized milling machine that can quickly create full-size models. Work and presentation areas include a 2-D presentation room, "a kind of darkroom in virtual reality where up to three full-size digital images can be projected for evaluation and comparison."

The 239,000-square-foot (22,200 m^{2}) building features a hallmark 6,000-square-foot (560 m^{2}) entry canopy and sits aside a 36,000-square-foot (3,300 m^{2}) reflecting pool. The parking lot includes an environmentally efficient bioswale system to filter water runoff.

- Kia Design Center, Irvine, CA
- 33°42′56.93″N 117°47′36.82″W

=== Kia Design Center Europe ===
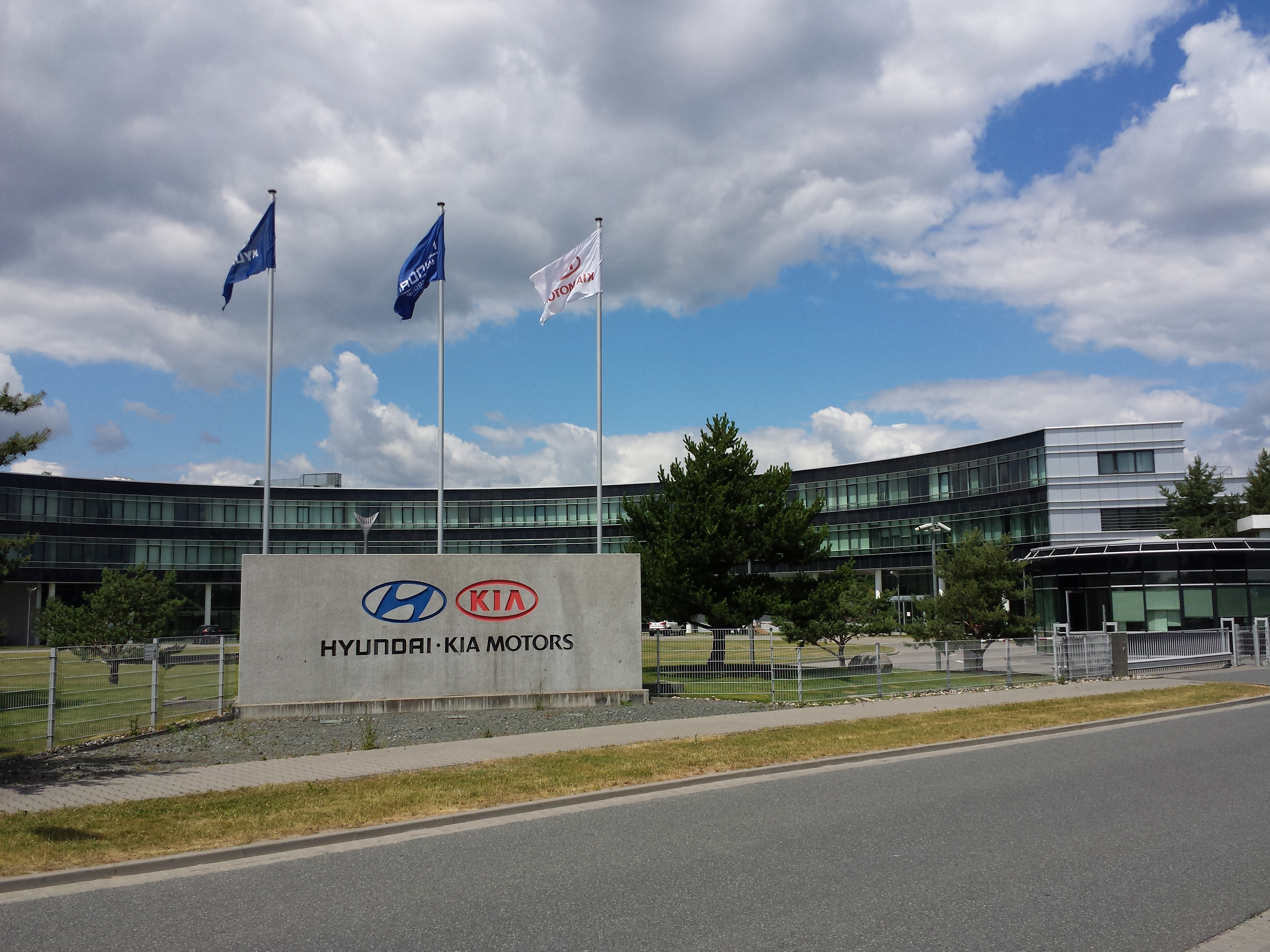
Hyundai-Kia European Technical Center

The Kia Design Center Europe was opened in 2007 in Frankfurt, Germany. Kia had previously shared a facility with Hyundai in Rüsselsheim, Germany. The new headquarters building is located adjacent to Frankfurt's main showground where the city hosts its biennial auto show.

- 50°6′52.01″N 8°38′42.76″E

=== Kia Design Center China ===
The Hyundai-Kia R&D center in China is located in both Shanghai and Yantai.

== Manufacturing facilities ==
=== South Korea ===
==== Autoland Gwangmyeong ====
The Autoland Gwangmyeong (formerly known as Sohari Plant) in Soha-dong, Gwangmyeong is Kia's first integrated automobile manufacturing plant, established in 1973 on 498,908 square metres (5,370,200 sq ft) of land. The plant is near the country's capital of Seoul in Gyeonggi province, with ready access to labor, other resources and transportation facilities, as well as the Seoul metropolitan area.

The factory currently manufactures the Kia Carnival, Kia K9/Quoris/K900, Kia EV3, Kia EV9 and will produce Kia EV4, with an annual output of 340,000 vehicles.

The Sohari Plant manufactured Kia's first internal combustion engine, followed by the manufacture of its first automobile, the Kia Brisa (1974–1982). In 1975, Kia exported its first vehicle, the Brisa pickup, to the Middle Eastern nation of Qatar.

The South Korean government forced Kia to halt car production in 1981, assessing the Korean auto market as too competitive. In 1986, the government allowed the company to resume manufacturing with its agreement to build the Ford Festiva for export.

The Sohari Plant manufactured the Kia Pride and its rebadged variants the Ford Festiva and Mazda 121, as well as the subsequent Kia Avella and its variant, the Ford Aspire.

- Kia Sohari Plant
- Kia Brisa (1974–1982)
- 37°26′20.94″N 126°53′23.15″E

==== Autoland Hwasung ====
Located in Woojeong-myeon, Gyeonggi Province and established in 1991, the plant covers 3,199,636 square metres (34,440,600 sq ft) of land and manufactures the Kia K5, Kia K8, Kia Tasman, Kia Sorento, Kia EV6, and Kia Niro. By July 2001, cumulative production passed 3 million. The facility maintains a proving ground with a high-speed oval, 12 different test tracks extending to a total length of 14 kilometres (8.7 mi) and 32 different road surfaces.

- Kia Hwasung Plant
- 37°1′54.78″N 126°46′41.72″E

==== Autoland Gwangju to Hanam factory ====
Located in Gwangju on approximately 1,022,244 square metres (11,003,340 sq ft) of land, the facility produces the Kia Soul, Kia Seltos, Kia Sportage, and Kia Bongo/K-Series.

Formerly Asia Motors used this plant until 1999.

For reference, in addition to the Autoland Gwangju, there is a Hanam factory to manufacture military cars and Kia Granbird.

- 35°9′45.49″N 126°52′15.57″E

==== Seosan Plant ====
Located in Seosan, the facility opened in 2004 as a joint venture with Donghee. It manufactures 230,000 units a year and is the producer of the Kia Picanto/Morning and Kia Ray.

- 36°51′13″N 126°26′38″E

=== China ===
==== Yancheng Plant ====
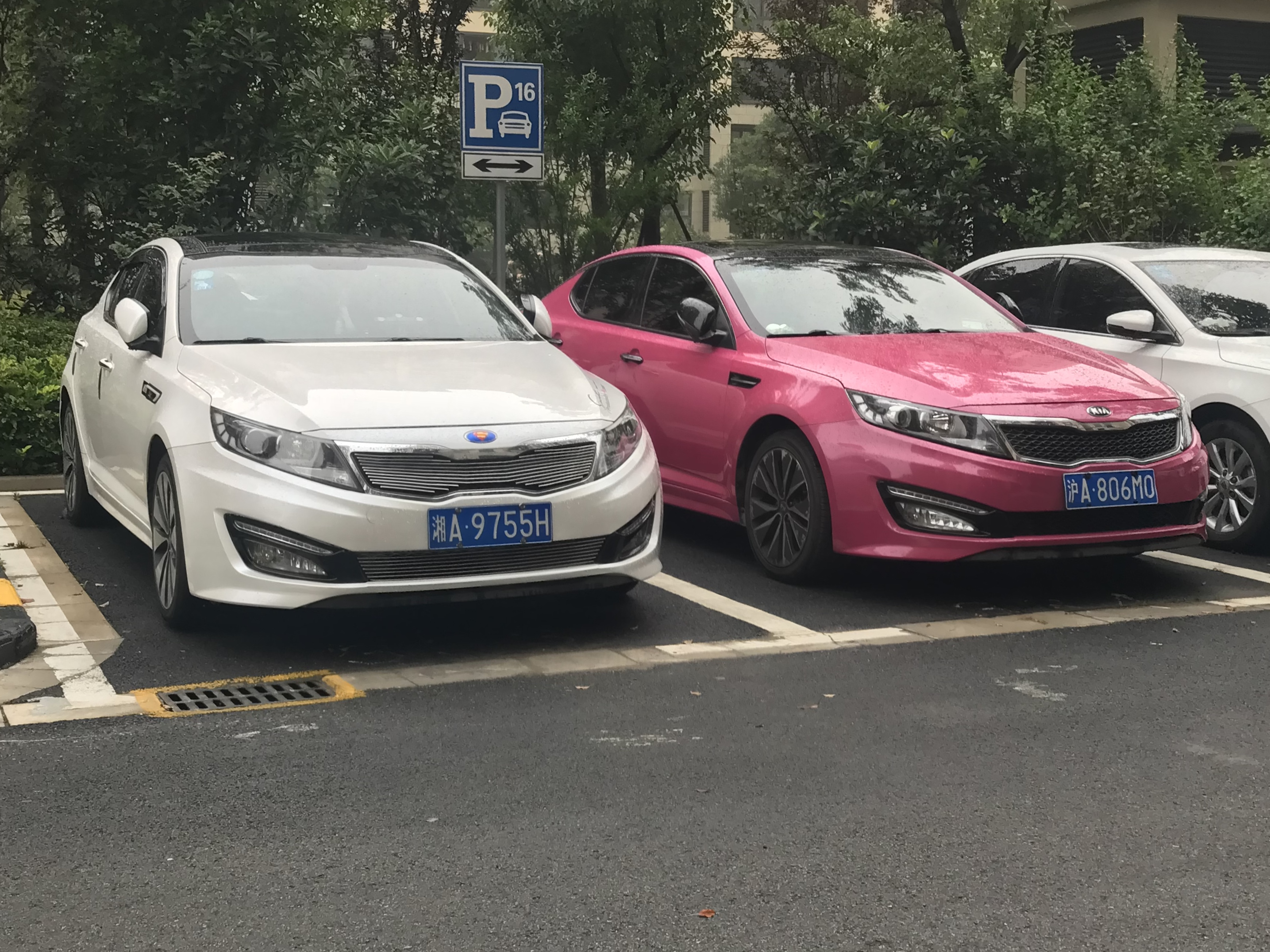
Kia K5s produced at the Yancheng Plant in China

In December 2007, Kia Motors Corporation opened its manufacturing facility in Yancheng, Jiangsu Province, its second plant in China and its second plant in conjunction as a joint venture. Yueda Kia is a joint venture of Kia and China's Jiangsu Yueda. It was originally established as Dongfeng Yueda Kia in 2002, but Dongfeng Automotive Group sold its 25% stake to Jiangsu Yueda in 2021. The facility is 3.9 million sq.-ft. (367,794 sq.-m) and is located just 2.2 miles (3.5 km) from the joint venture's existing facility. At an initial cost of US$800 million, the fully integrated passenger car production facility will have an annual capacity of 300,000 units, boosting DYK's total annual capacity to 430,000 vehicles.

=== India ===
==== Anantapur Plant (KIN) ====
Kia created a greenfield facility in the Anantapur district of Andhra Pradesh, opened in 2018. The site occupies 536 acres (2.17 km^{2}) and has facilities for stamping, welding, painting and assembly with annual production capacity of 300,000 vehicles. Its head office is currently in Amaravathi which is the new capital of Andhra Pradesh. It will also be home to supplier companies’ facilities. The plant currently manufactures the Kia Seltos from mid-2019, Kia Sonet from September 2020 and Kia Carens for domestic market and exports to emerging markets. The plant also manufactures the Kia Carnival exclusively for domestic market.

- Plant location: 14°09′40″N 77°37′20″E
- Address: Ammavaripalli Village, Ananthapur, Andhra Pradesh-515164

=== Mexico ===
==== Monterrey Plant (KMMX) ====
Located in Pesquería, near Monterrey, Nuevo León, and opened in September 2016, this US$1 billion plant is capable of producing 300,000 cars annually. The facility currently manufactures the third generation Forte and the fourth generation Rio. In 2024, the Kia Motors Manufacturing Mexico began to assembly the facelifted 2025 NX4 Hyundai Tucson instead of Hyundai Motor Manufacturing Alabama. In 2017, Kia Motors Manufacturing Mexico began to assembly the fifth generation Hyundai Accent for the American continent, which was discontinued in 2022. The press factory developed and installed a uniform cushioning device with a high quality stabilization effect by ensuring uniform panel quality. The body shop has achieved 100% welding automation rate with more than 300 robots. In the event of a facility failure, a monitoring system has also been established that allows Korean experts to provide remote support. The paint shop applied an eco-friendly water-soluble method that can paint a total of 15 kinds of colors. The outfitting factory applied a one-kit system using a bridge direct supply method for module parts such as seats and bumpers, and a conveyor.

In 2022, Kia announced an additional $480 million to open at least five new production facilities while $67 million of the existing investment will be used to improve commuting conditions.

=== Pakistan ===
==== Lucky Motor Corporation ====
Lucky Motor is a Pakistani automobile assembler and distributor owned by the Yunus Brothers Group. It currently assembles the Kia Picanto, Kia Sportage, Kia Sorento, Kia Grand Carnival, Kia Stonic, and Kia Frontier.

=== Slovakia ===
==== Žilina Plant (KaSK) ====
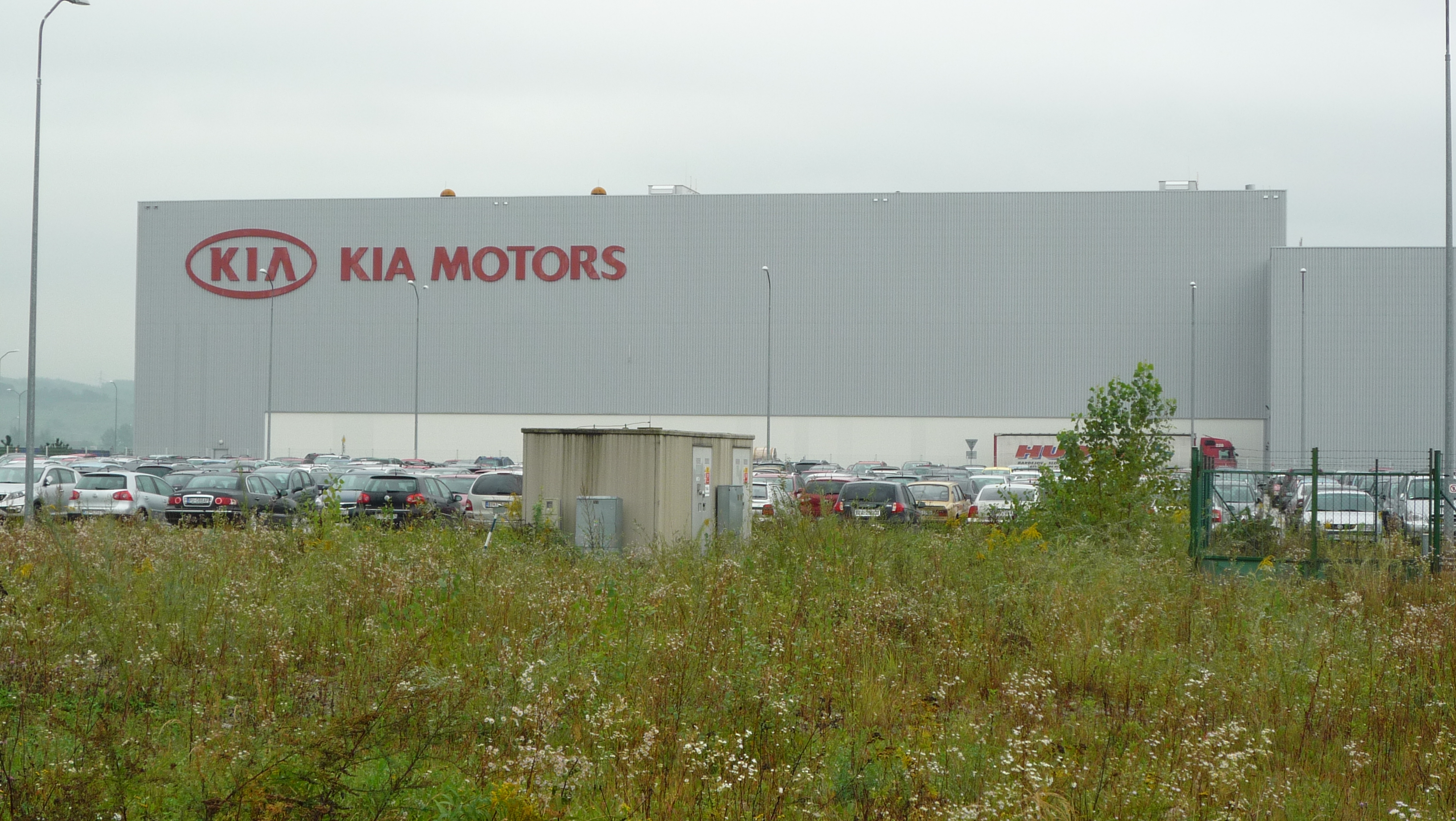
Kia Motors Slovakia

In April 2007, Kia opened its first plant in Europe, at the initial cost of €1b, in Žilina, Slovakia, about 200 kilometres north-east of Bratislava, with initial production concentrating around the Kia Cee'd model, designed exclusively for the European market, with production later expanding to the Kia Venga and Kia Sportage. The capacity of the plant is 300,000 units per year. It is one of the few auto factories in the world that is capable of building up to eight different models on the same line, and build ratios can be adjusted to demand. In 2019, Kia's Zilina plant built a system to replace all electricity with renewable energy. In 2020, Kia invested 70 million euros to expand the engine production line at Kia's Zilina plant and dispatched 184 technicians on chartered flights. After the expansion of the engine production line, the company will produce 1.6 GDI engines and 1.6 T-GDI engines. In August 2025, Kia started to produce battery electric vehicles in Europe, with the first model being the Kia EV4 Hatchback.

- Kia Žilina Plant Official Site
- Kia Slovakia Plant
- 49°12′51.16″N 18°49′24.31″E

=== United States ===
==== Georgia Plant (KMMG) ====
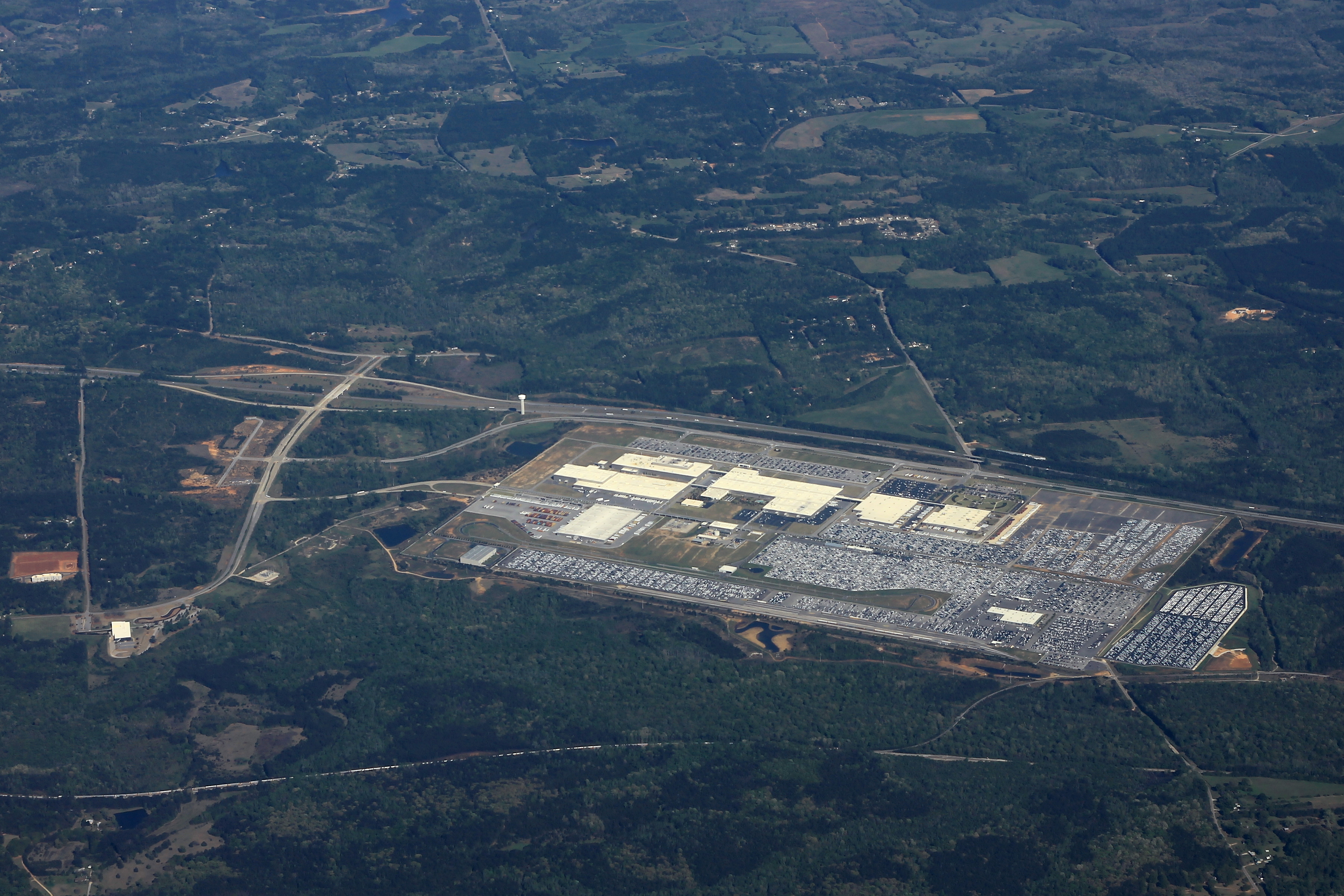
Aerial view of the factory

Kia Manufacturing Georgia (KMMG), Kia's plant in West Point, Georgia, is capable of producing 350,000 cars annually for the North American and global markets. It was announced in 2006 and went online in 2010, with the state of Georgia providing significant incentives. At an initial cost of $1 billion (US) the facility comprises 2.2 million-square-feet on more than 2,200 acres (8.9 km^{2}) of land near Interstate 85. In addition to four main areas (stamping, welding, paint, and assembly), the facility also includes a transmission shop, module shop, and a two-mile (3 km) test track. The assembly area features more than a half mile of height-adjustable conveyors and wood flooring.

Kia Georgia is home of the Telluride SUV, Sorento SUV, Sportage SUV, all-electric Kia EV6 SUV, and the all-electric EV9 SUV. This advanced manufacturing facility represents a $2.8 billion investment on a 2,200-acre site, operating 24 hours a day.

Kia's Georgia plant recorded cumulative production of 1 million units in 2013 and exceeded 3 million units in September 2019. On December 31, 2021, President Jangsu Shin retired and a new CEO, Stuart Countess, was appointed effective January 2022.

==== Savannah Plant ====
On May 20, 2022, Kia's parent company Hyundai announced plans to construct a new electric vehicle plant near Savannah, Georgia. Construction of the sprawling site took two years, with production starting in late 2024, and the site is now dubbed the Hyundai Metaplant.

=== Uzbekistan ===
==== ADM-Jizzakh ====
The ADM Jizzakh plant began its work at the end of 2020 with a yearly production capacity of 25,000, it currently produces Kia Seltos, Kia K5 and Kia K8.

=== Vietnam ===
==== Chu Lai Plant ====
Since 2001, Kia manufactured automobiles as part of a joint venture with Truong Hai Automobile Co. at a factory located in Chu Lai, Quảng Nam Province, Vietnam. The site covers 320 hectares (790 acres), and Truong Hai was the first private company in Vietnam to manufacture automobiles, and the first to achieve an annual output of 5,000 automobiles. The facility expanded in 2003 on 38 ha in Tam Hiep Industrial Park with an investment of VND1,900 billion. In 2007, Truong Hai Automobile Co. Ltd became Truong Hai Automobile Joint Stock Company (Thaco), with automobiles marketed as Thaco-Kia. The joint venture produces the Hyundai Solati and Hyundai County in Chu Lai.

- Kia Quang Nam Plant
- Kia Truong Hai Official Site
