= Kia Stonic =

Subcompact crossover hatchback

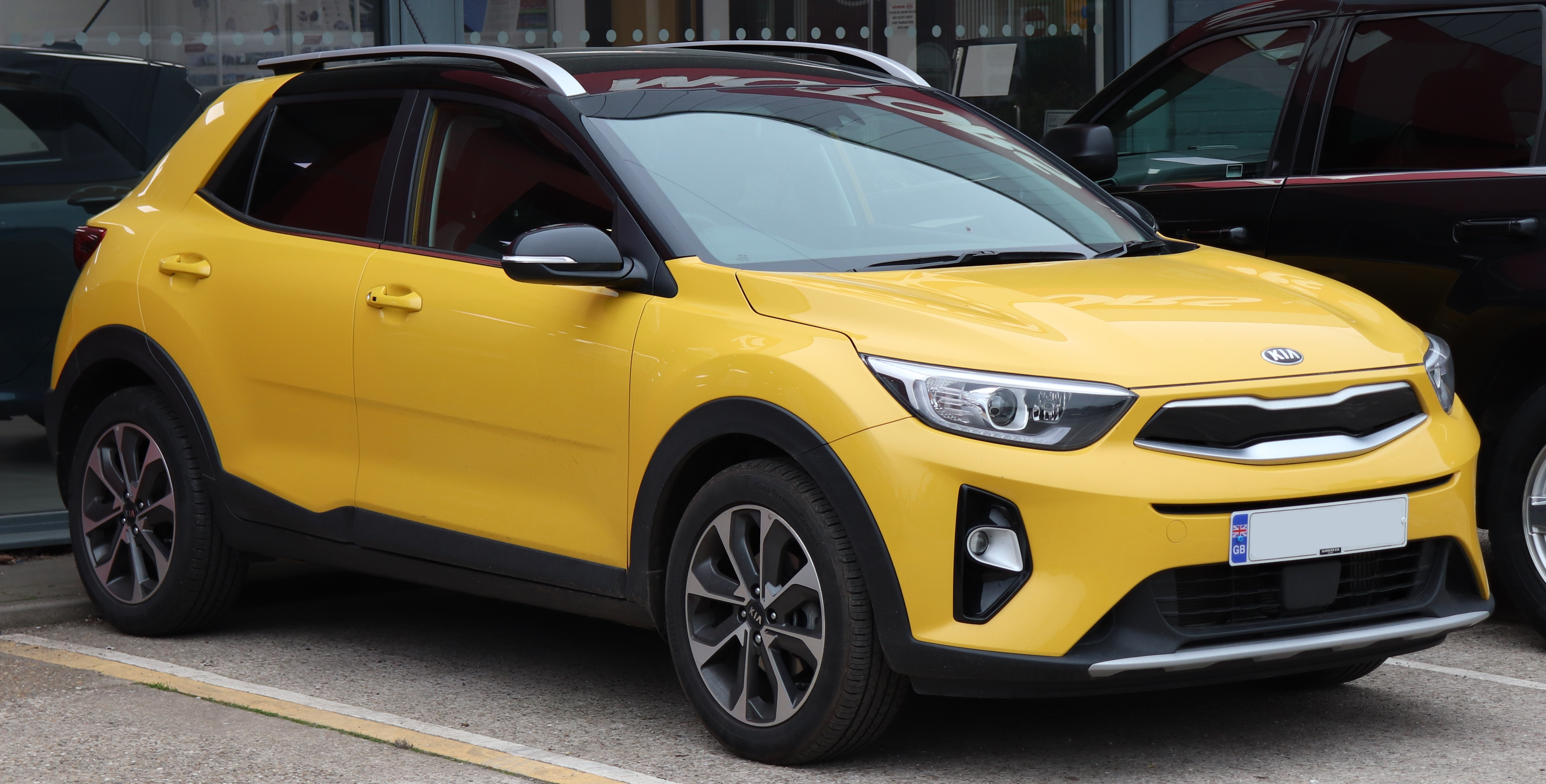

Overview
- Manufacturer: Kia Corporation
- Model code: YB CUV
- Also called: Kia KX1 (China)
- Production: 2017–present
- Assembly: South Korea: Gwangmyeong (Sohari Plant, 2017–2023); Seosan (Donghee, 2023–present); China: Yancheng (Yueda Kia); Pakistan: Karachi (Lucky Motor Corporation)
- Designer: Peter Schreyer

Body and chassis
- Class: Subcompact crossover SUV (B)
- Body style: 5-door hatchback
- Layout: Front-engine, front-wheel-drive
- Platform: Hyundai-Kia GB
- Related: Kia Rio (YB) (formerly)

Powertrain
- Engine: Petrol: 1.0 L Kappa II T-GDI I3; 1.0 L Smartstream G1.0 T-GDI I3; 1.2 L Kappa II MPI I4; 1.2 L Smartstream G1.2 MPI I4; 1.4 L Kappa II MPI I4; Diesel: 1.6 L U II CRDi I4; 1.6 L Smartstream D1.6 CRDi I4; Diesel mild hybrid: 1.6 L Smartstream D1.6 CRDi I4 EcoDynamics+
- Transmission: 5-speed manual; 6-speed manual; 6-speed automatic; 7-speed DCT; CVT
- Hybrid drivetrain: Mild Hybrid (EcoDynamics+)

Dimensions
- Wheelbase: 2,580 mm (101.6 in); 2,570 mm (101.2 in) (China)
- Length: 4,100–4,140 mm (161.4–163.0 in)
- Width: 1,760 mm (69.3 in); 1,735 mm (68.3 in) (China)
- Height: 1,520 mm (59.8 in); 1,533 mm (60.4 in) (China)
- Curb weight: 1,060–1,104 kg (2,337–2,434 lb) (China)

Chronology
- Successor: Kia Sonet (China/Philippines)

The Kia Stonic (Korean: 기아 스토닉, romanized: Gia Seutonik) is a (B-segment) subcompact crossover hatchback manufactured by Kia Motors since 2017. Its name is derived from the words "speedy" and "tonic".

== Overview ==
The Kia Stonic made its debut at the 2017 International Motor Show Germany. It is the smallest in Kia's SUV lineup, below the Niro, Sportage, and Sorento. The Stonic shares its platform and interior with the fourth generation Kia Rio.

Later, it debuted in Frankfurt on 20 June 2017 and in South Korea on 13 July 2017, and was released in the fourth quarter of 2017. It is marketed as the Kia KX1 in China.

The Stonic is offered with a choice of four engines: a turbocharged 1.0-litre three-cylinder engine, a 1.2-litre four-cylinder engine, a 1.4-litre four-cylinder engine, and a 1.6-litre CRDi four-cylinder diesel engine. In 2020, the 1.6 diesel got a 48 volt mild hybrid addition, called the 'EcoDynamics+'. The Stonic was discontinued in South Korea in September 2020 due to sluggish sales.

The facelifted model of the Stonic has been assembled and sold in Pakistan since November 2021. It is offered it two variants: EX and EX+. Both variants come with the 1.4-litre Kappa II MPI I4 engine and 6-speed automatic transmission.

In 2023, Kia moved production of the Stonic from Gwangmyeong to the Seosan plant operated by Donghee, as the Gwangmyeong plant was being retooled for EV production.

The second facelift was unveiled on 1 September 2025. The exterior features a redesigned front and rear fascia, updated headlights and taillights and new alloys, following the Opposites United design language. The interior features a 12.3 inch touchscreen a new steering wheel. The non-hybrid 74 kW (99 hp) and 172 N⋅m (127 lb⋅ft) of torque, the mild-hybrid produces 85 kW (114 hp). The 2026 Stonic is to increase the mild-hybrid's power to 88 kW (118 hp) and 172 N⋅m (127 lb⋅ft).

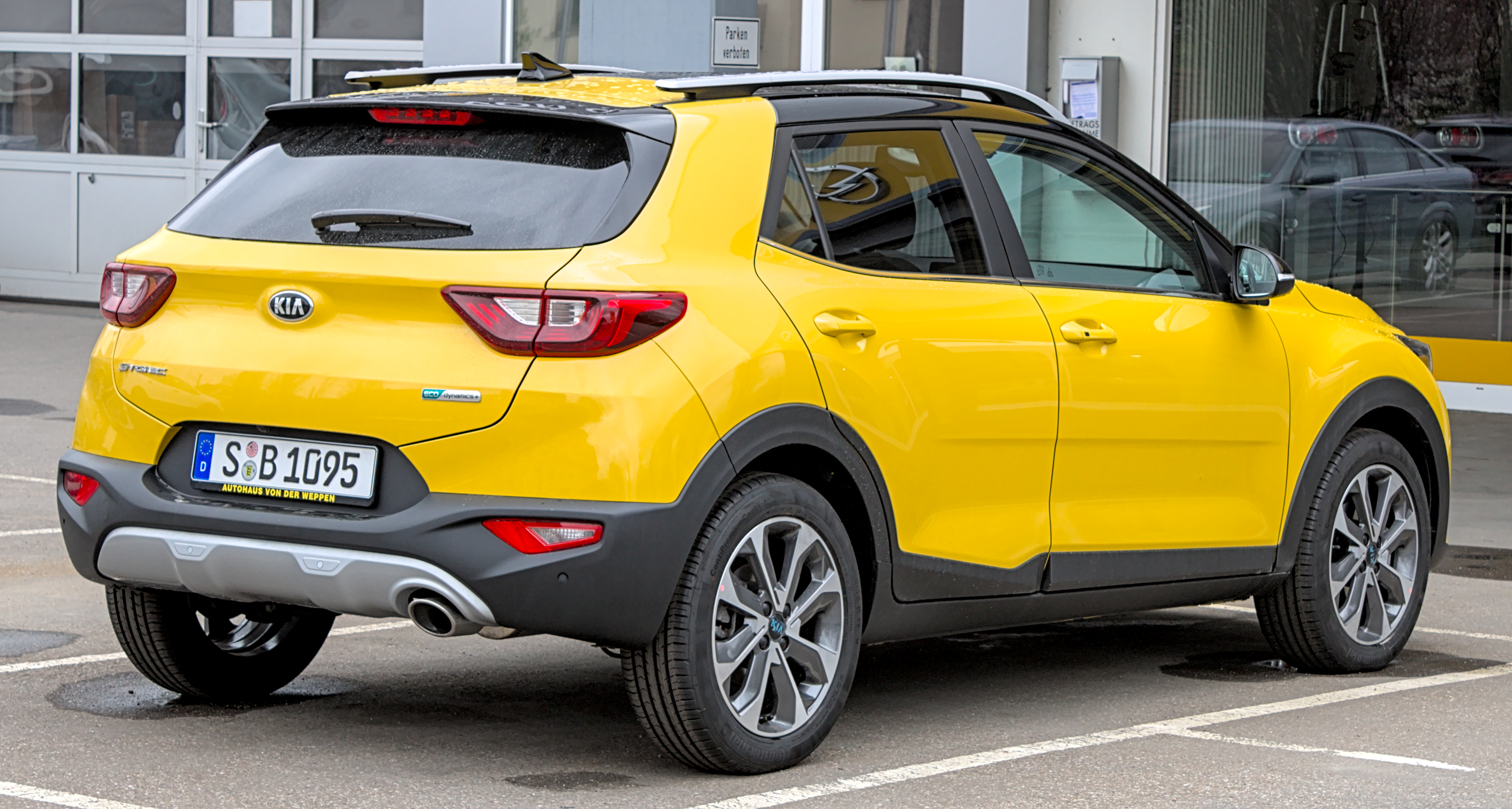
2017 Kia Stonic (pre-facelift)

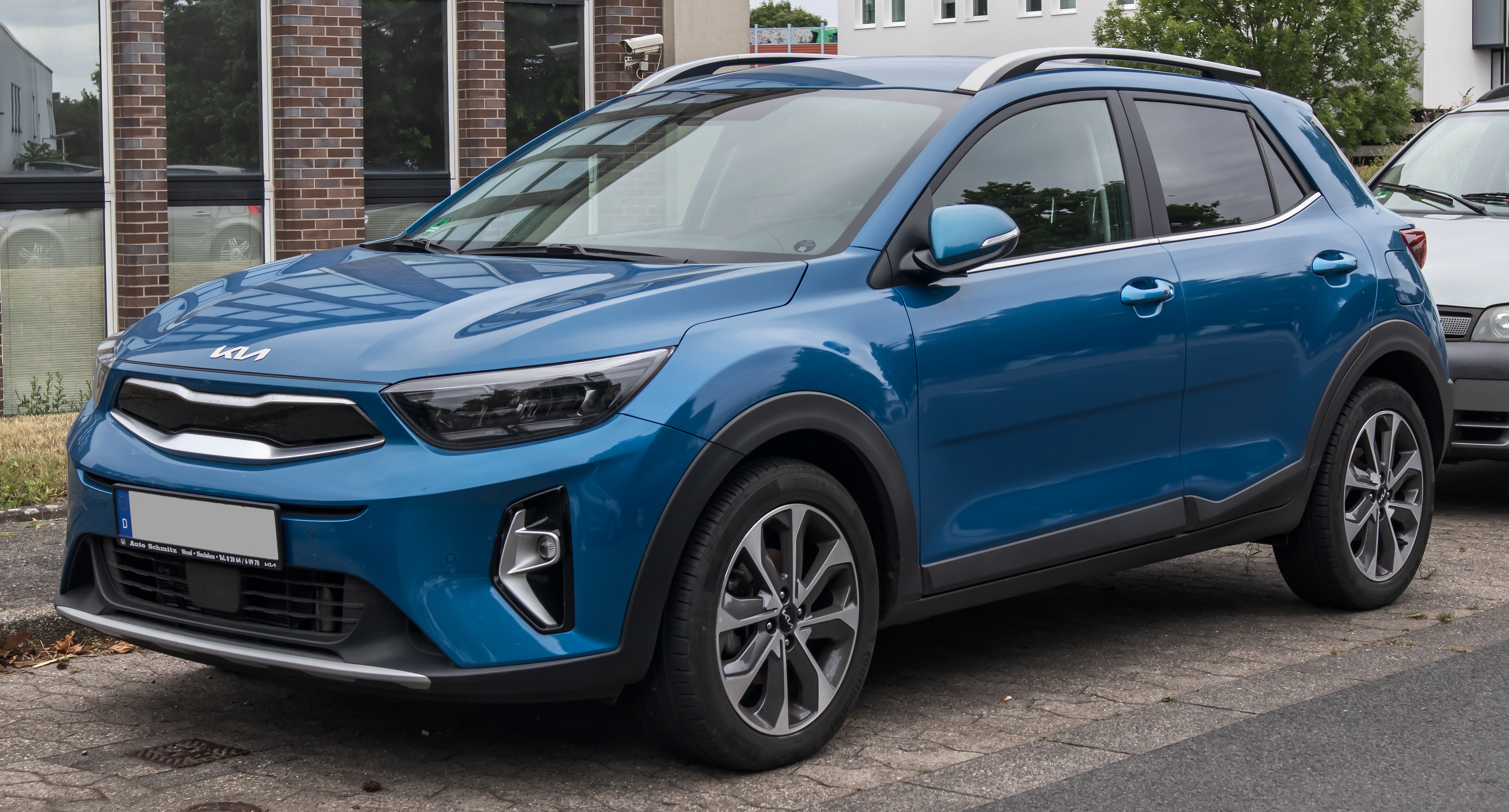
First facelift Stonic (front)

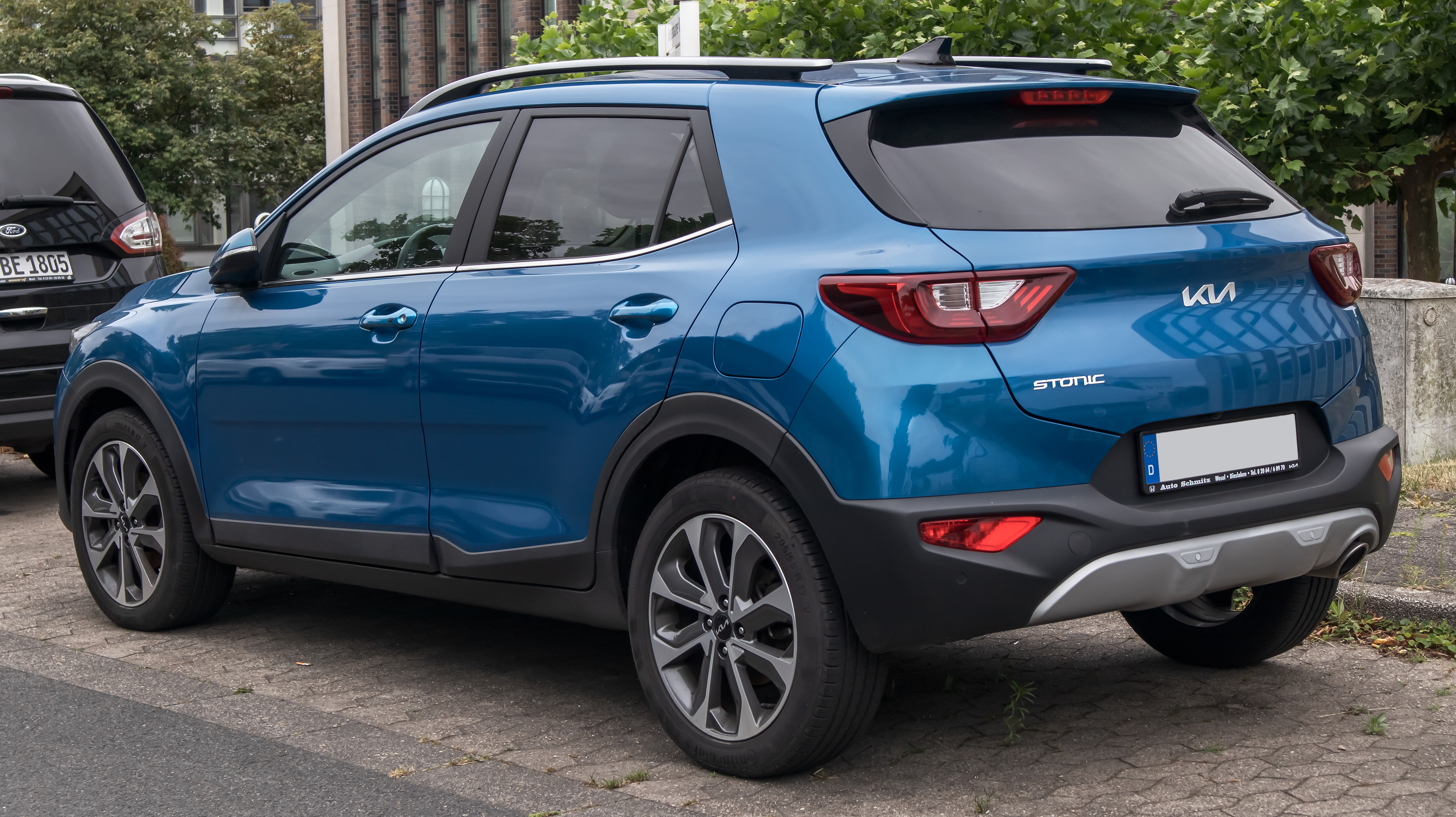
First facelift Stonic (rear)

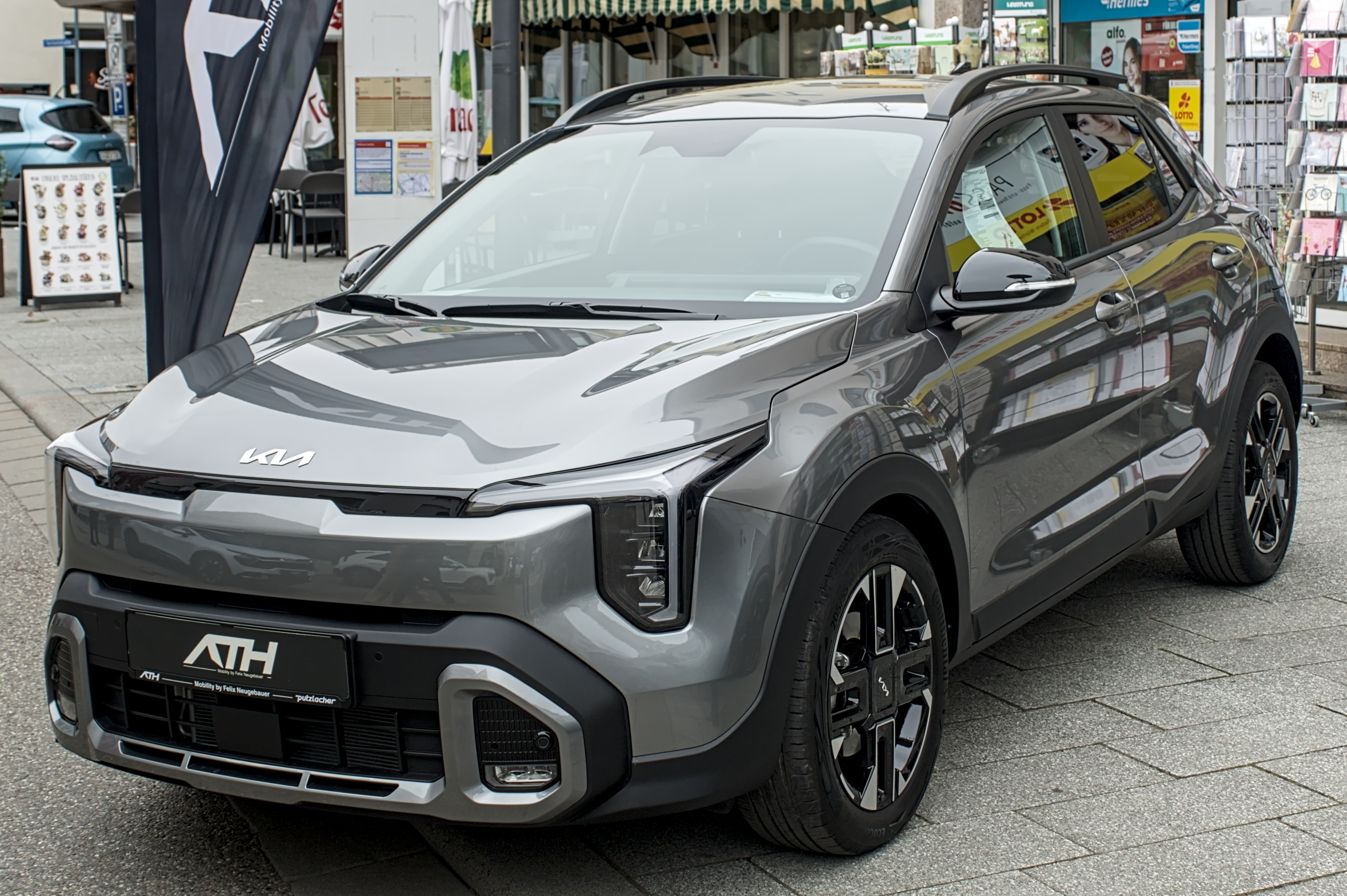
Second facelift Stonic

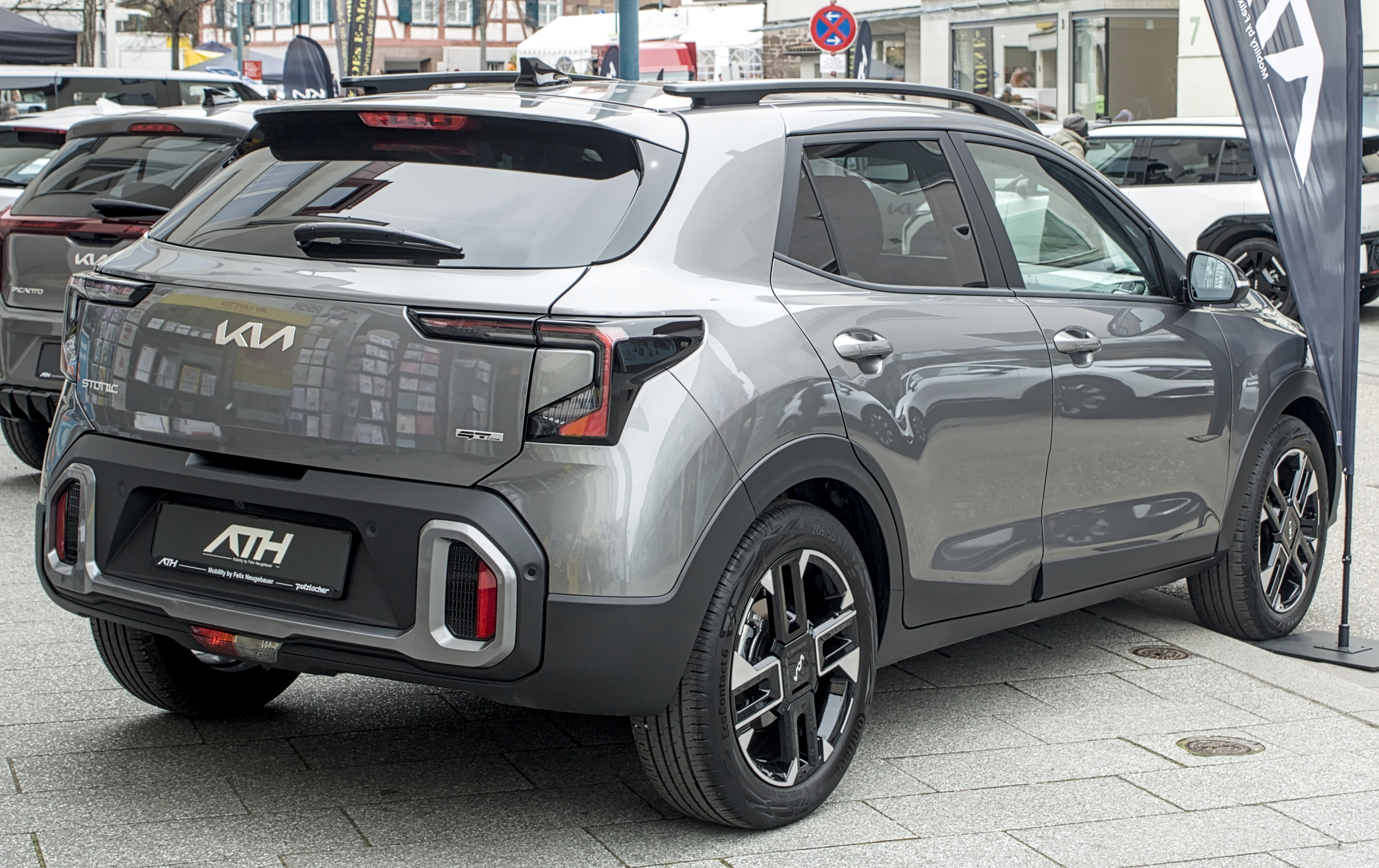
Second facelift Stonic

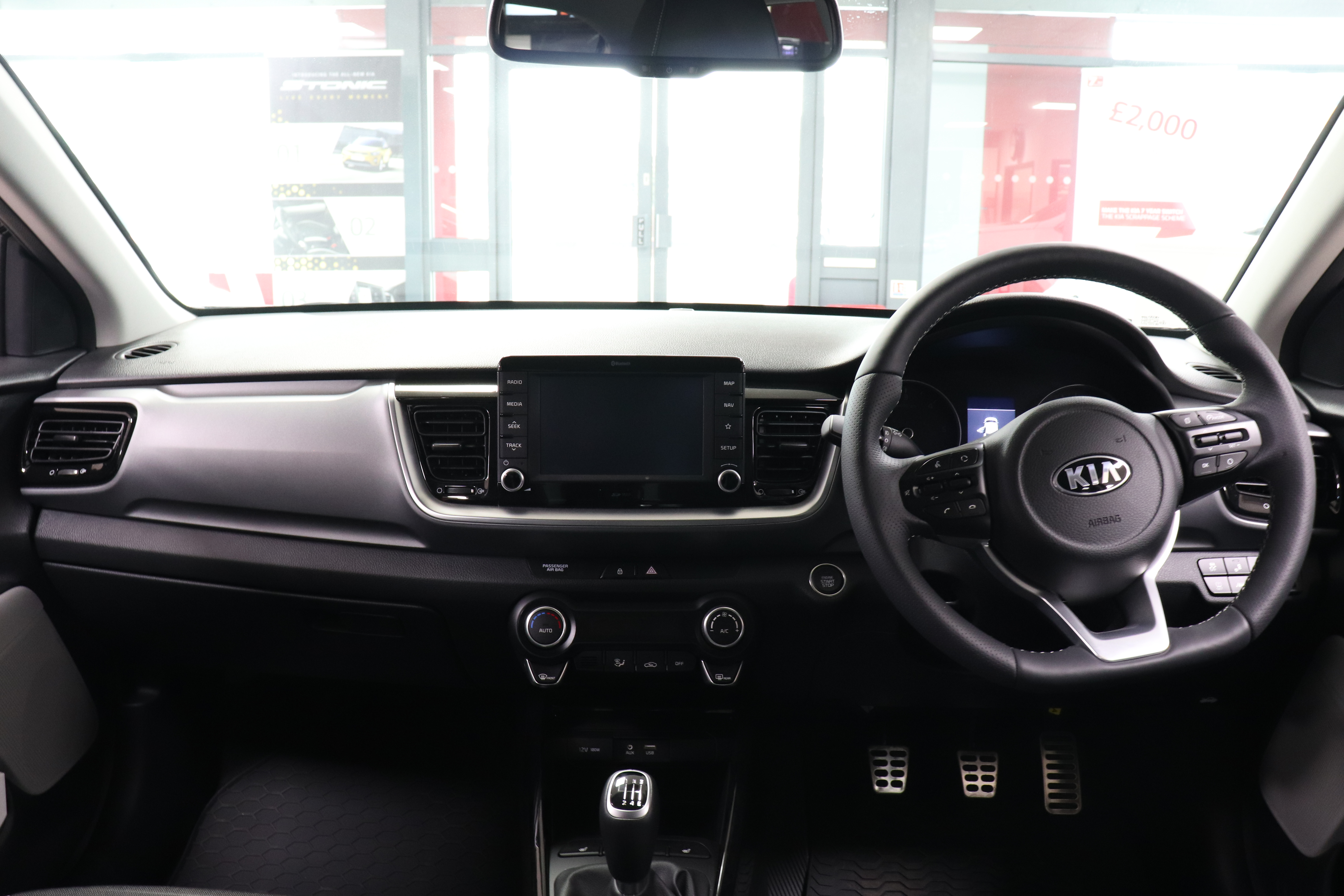
Interior

=== Kia KX1 ===
The Kia KX1 is the variant built by the Yueda Kia joint venture for the Chinese market. Despite the high resemblance between the KX1 and the Stonic, the KX1 was slightly restyled for the Chinese market, featuring a modified hood, redesigned bumpers, improved DRL, and a circular fuel tank cap. In addition, the KX1 uses a completely different dashboard design. Compared to the international model, the Chinese-made version is marginally shorter, with a full body length of 4,100 mm instead of 4,140 mm, and round fog lamps instead of boomerang-shaped LED lights. It lacks AEB, blind zone monitoring and cruise control compared to the Korean-made version.

The KX1 is powered by a single 1.4-litre petrol engine producing 100 hp (75 kW). The transmission is either 6-speed manual transmission, or a six-speed automatic transmission. Additionally, the top of the trim KX1 receives advanced multimedia, climate control, video surveillance cameras and a sports aerodynamic body kit.

The Chinese-made KX1 has been exported to the Philippines under the Stonic nameplate in October 2020. The Stonic was replaced by the Kia Sonet in June 2024.

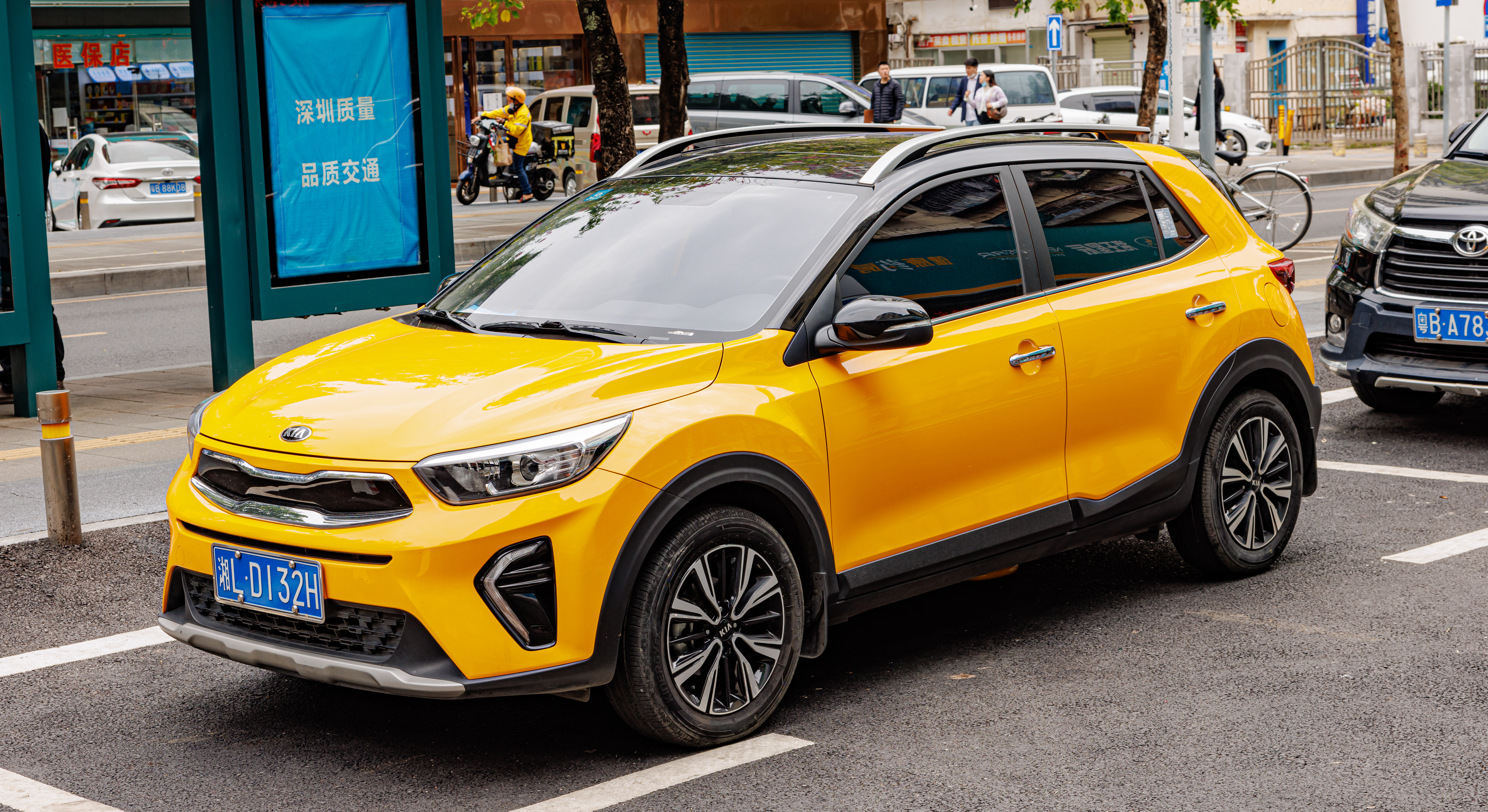
Kia KX1 (China)

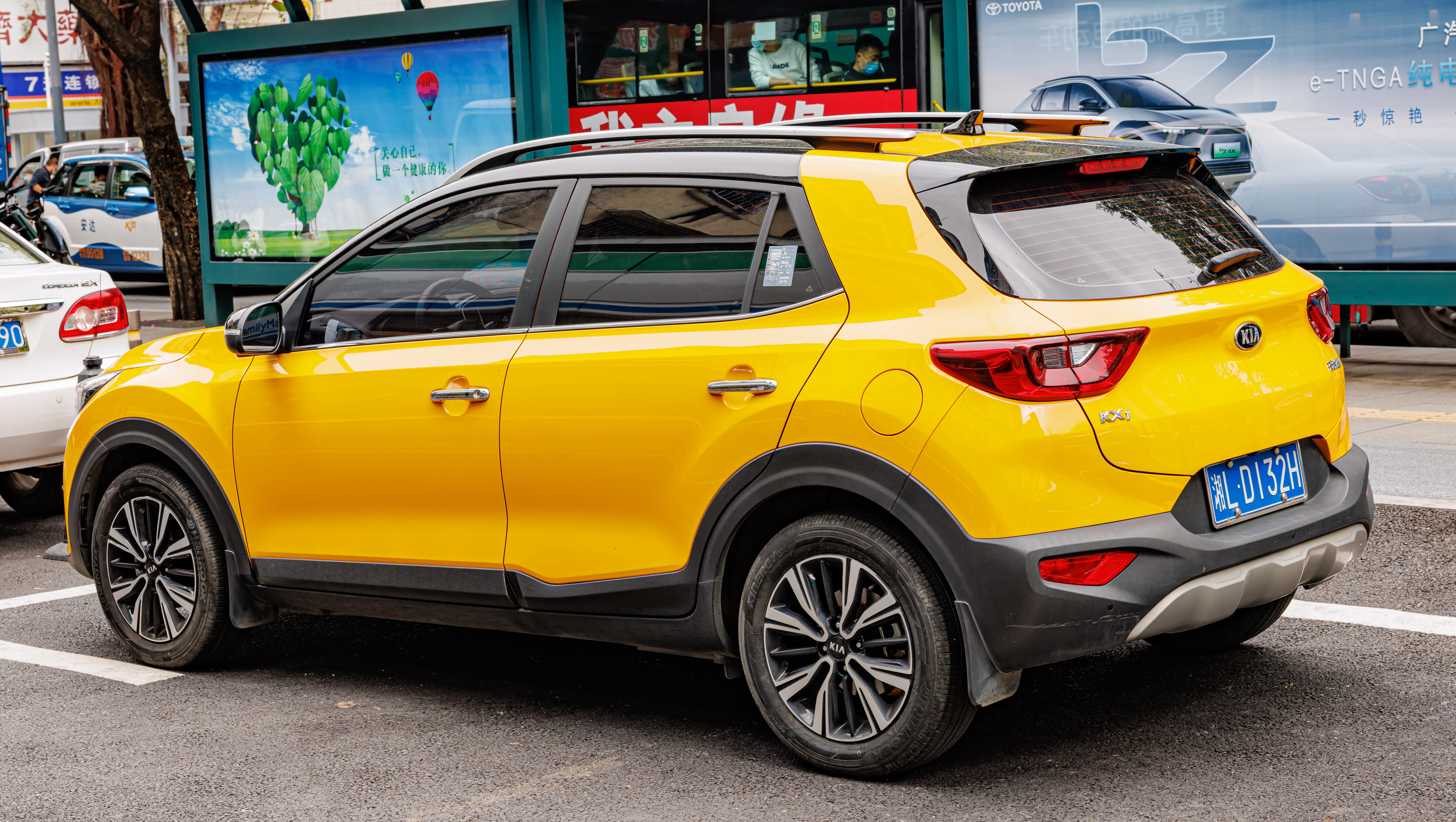
Kia KX1 (China)

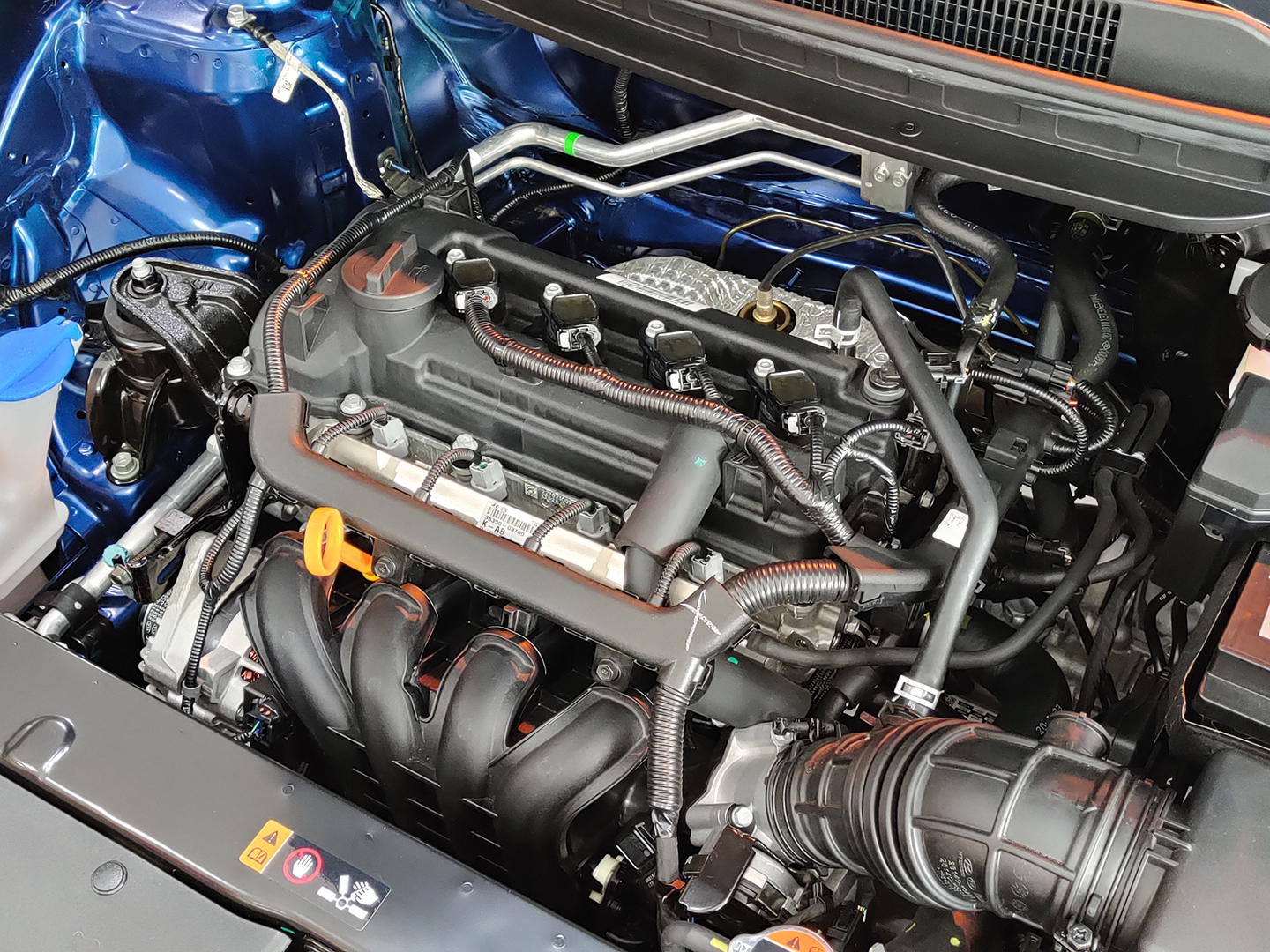
Kia KX1 1.4 litre petrol engine

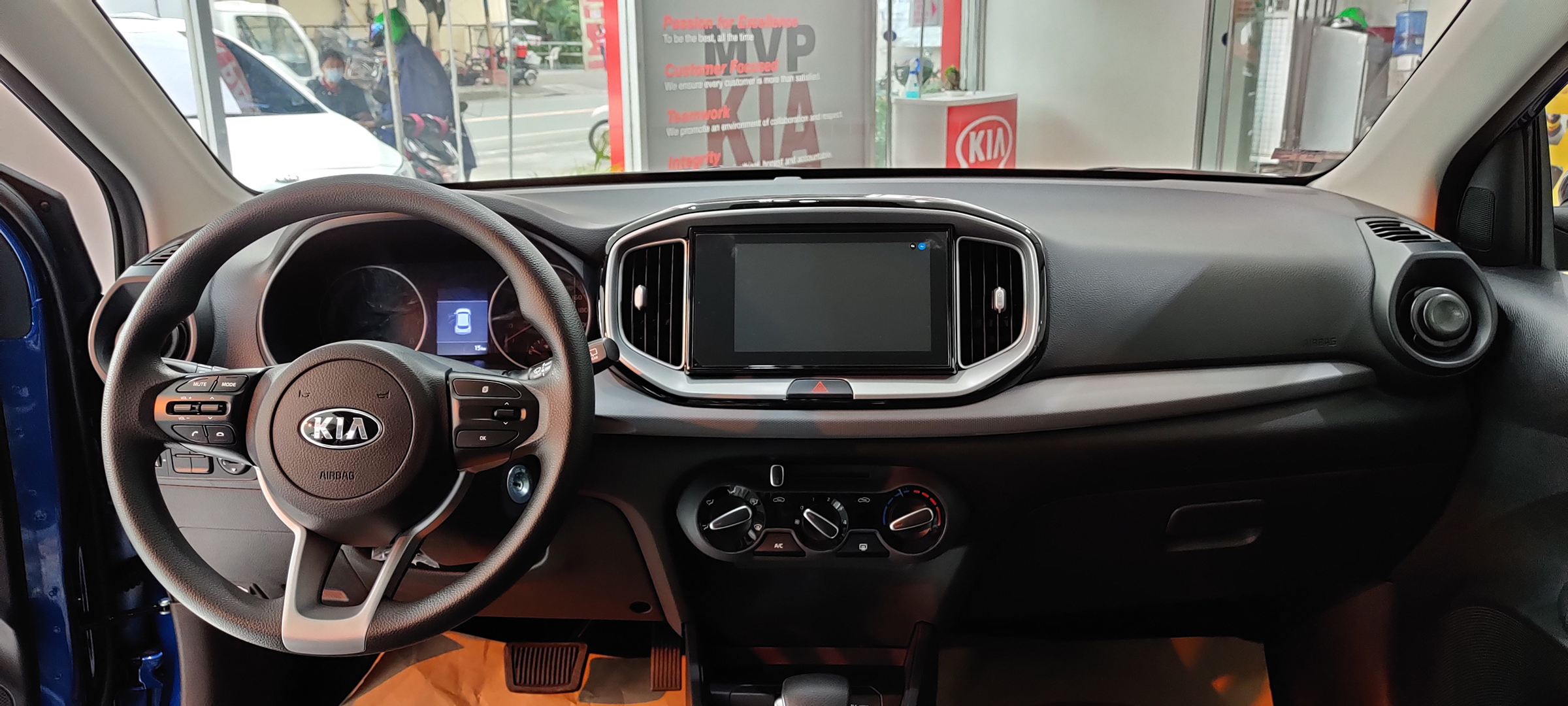
Kia KX1 interior

== Safety ==
Euro NCAP

Euro NCAP test results for a LHD, 5-door hatchback variant with standard equipment on a 2017 registration:

Euro NCAP test results Kia Stonic w/ standard equipment (2017)
Test	Points	%
Overall:	3 /5 stars	
Adult occupant:	32.5	85%
Child occupant:	41.2	84%
Pedestrian:	26	62%
Safety assist:	3	25%

Euro NCAP test results for a LHD, 5-door hatchback variant with optional safety pack on a 2017 registration:

Euro NCAP test results Kia Stonic w/ optional safety pack (2017)
Test	Points	%
Overall:	5 /5 stars	
Adult occupant:	35.5	93%
Child occupant:	41.2	84%
Pedestrian:	29.8	71%
Safety assist:	7.1	59%

== Awards ==
The Stonic won the iF product design award in the "Transportation Design" category and the Red Dot award in the "Car Design" category in 2018.

== Sales ==
Year	Europe (Note: Includes EU countries, Iceland, Liechtenstein, Norway and Switzerland.)	China	South Korea
2017	11,747		9,133
2018	55,742	20,626	16,305
2019	66,749	35,618	8,276
2020	51,322	20,145	4,171
2021	58,425	18,332	348
2022	55,161	13,150	
2023	58,116	9,380	
2024	57,867	7,729	
2025		9.765	
