= Kia Sonet =

Subcompact crossover SUV

- 2021 Kia Sonet 1.5 Premiere (Indonesia, pre-facelift)

Overview
- Manufacturer: Kia
- Model code: QY
- Production: 2020–present
- Assembly: India: Anantapur, Andhra Pradesh (Kia India); Ecuador: Quito (Aymesa); Vietnam: Chu Lai, Quảng Nam (THACO); Uzbekistan: Jizzakh (ADM-Jizzakh); China: Yancheng (Yueda Kia)

Body and chassis
- Class: Subcompact crossover SUV
- Body style: 5-door SUV
- Layout: Front-engine, front-wheel-drive
- Platform: Hyundai-Kia K2
- Related: Hyundai Venue (QXi)

Powertrain
- Engine: Petrol: 1.0 L Kappa II T‑GDi I3; 1.2 L Smartstream G1.2 MPi I4; 1.5 L Smartstream G1.5 MPi I4; Diesel: 1.5 L Smartstream D1.5 CRDi I4
- Transmission: 5-speed manual; 6-speed manual; 6-speed semi-automatic; 6-speed automatic; 7-speed DCT; CVT

Dimensions
- Wheelbase: 2,500 mm (98.4 in)
- Length: 3,995–4,120 mm (157.3–162.2 in)
- Width: 1,790 mm (70.5 in)
- Height: 1,610–1,647 mm (63.4–64.8 in)

Chronology
- Predecessor: Kia Stonic/KX1 (China/Philippines)

The Kia Sonet is a subcompact crossover SUV manufactured by Kia since 2020. Positioned below the Seltos and closely related to the similarly sized sibling Hyundai Venue, it is sold in emerging markets, including Asia, Africa, the Middle East, and Latin America.

== Overview ==
The Sonet was previewed as the Sonet Concept in February 2020. The production version made its global debut on 7 August 2020 and was sold starting from 18 September 2020 in India. It is the third model from Kia in India after the Seltos and the Carnival.

In the Indian market, the Sonet occupies the sub-four-metre SUV category with its 3,995 mm (157.3 in) length dimension, benefitting from the Indian tax benefits for cars shorter than four meters. For export markets, the Sonet is equipped with longer front and rear bumpers, increasing its length to 4,120 mm (162.2 in).

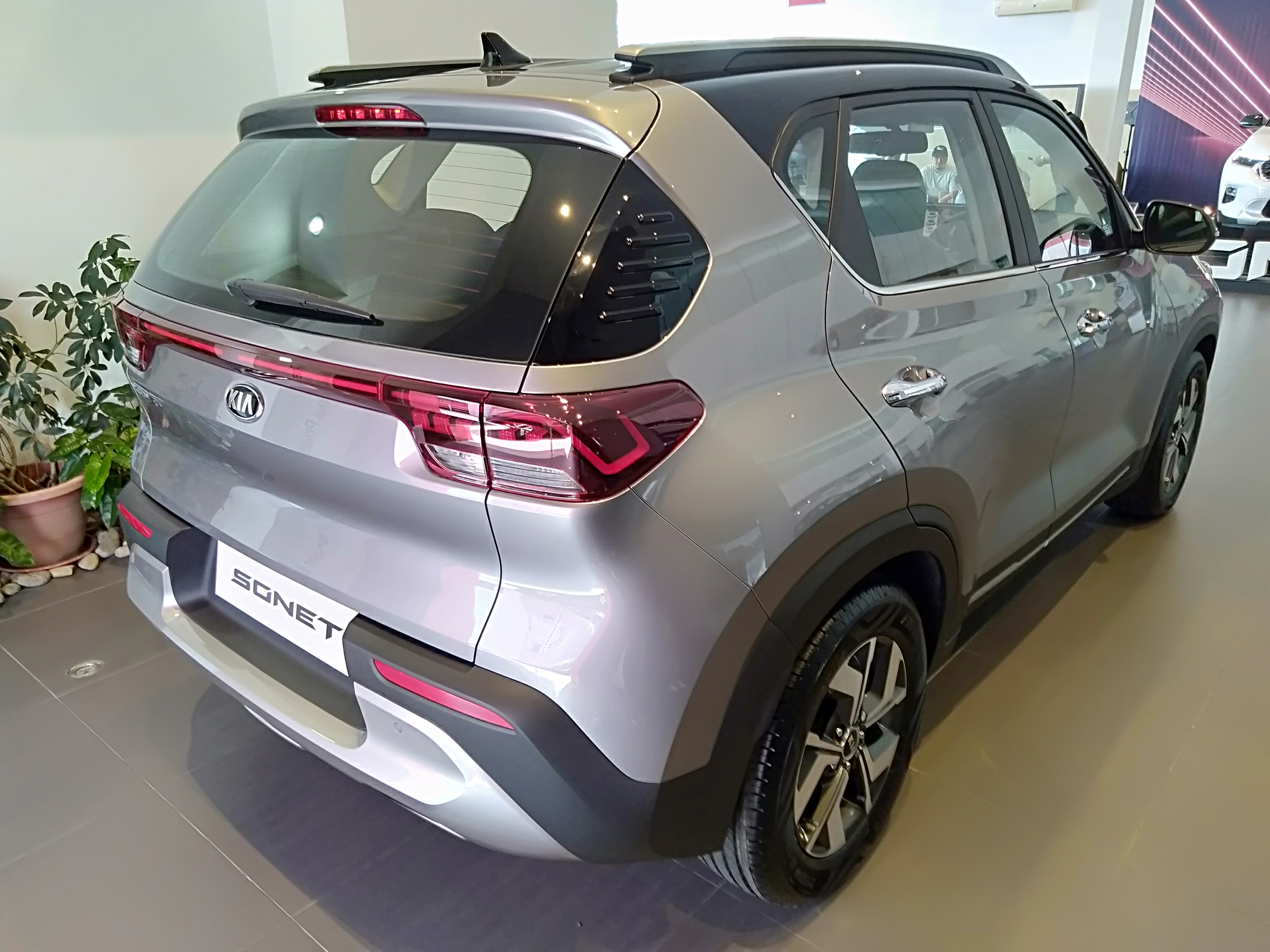
2022 Sonet GLS (Brunei, pre-facelift)

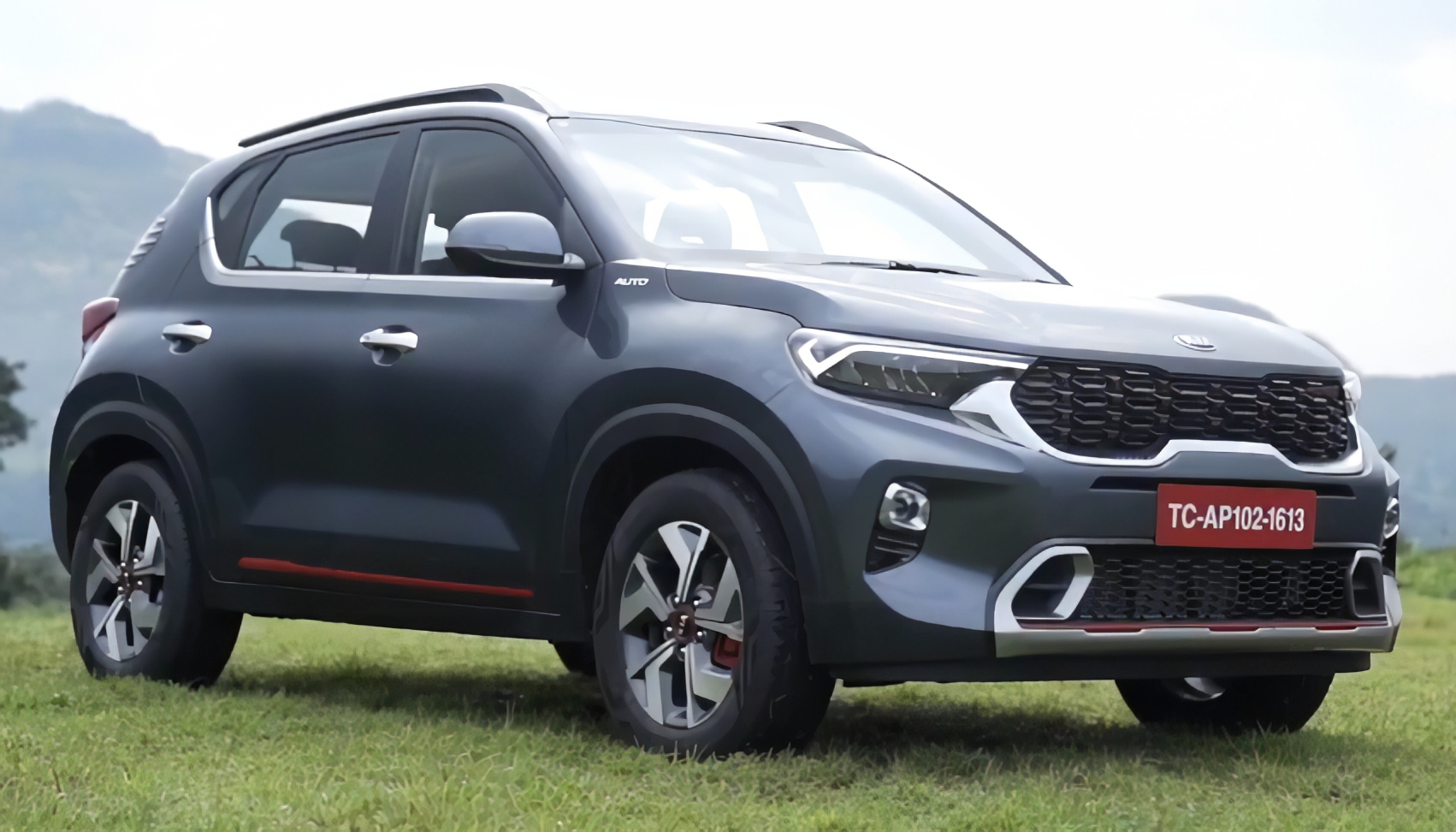
2021 Sonet GTX+ CRDi (India, pre-facelift)

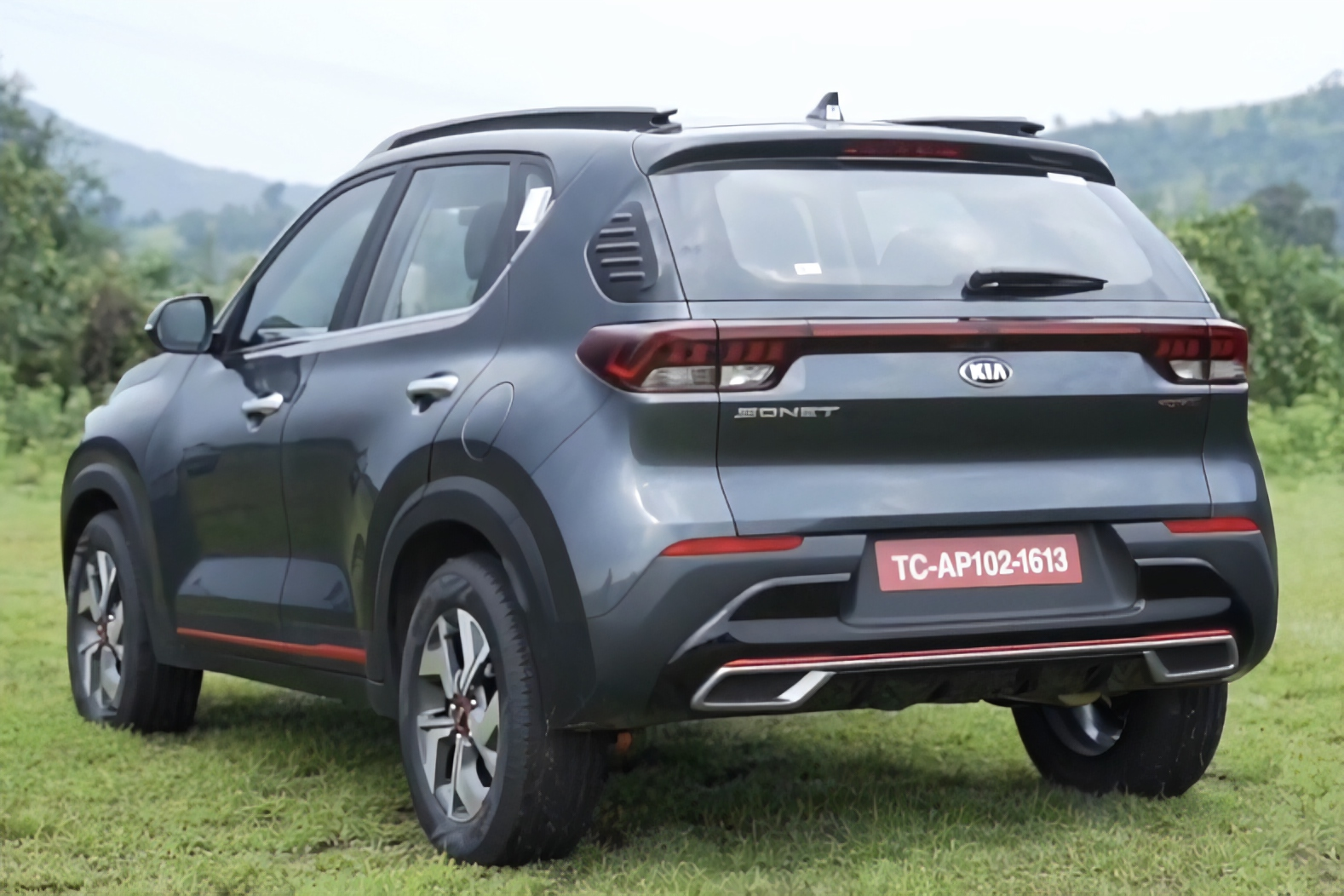
2021 Sonet GTX+ CRDi (India, pre-facelift)

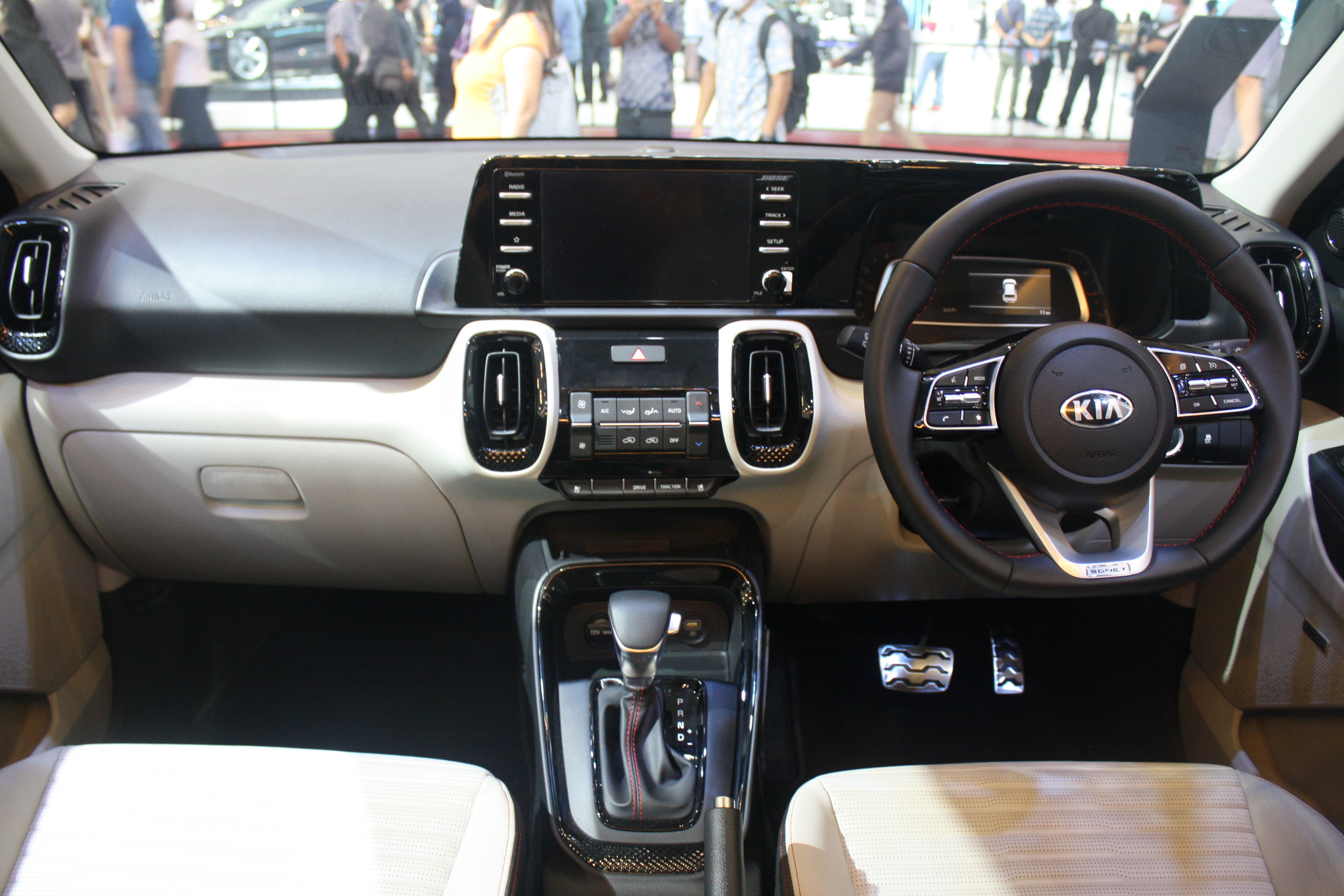
Interior (pre-facelift)

=== Facelift ===
The facelifted Sonet was unveiled on 14 December 2023. It features redesigned front and rear fascia with redesigned headlights and taillights. The interior gets a 10.25-inch touchscreen.

In January 2024, Yueda Kia joint venture in China started producing the facelifted Sonet. The first production batch was exported to Mexico, the Dominican Republic, and Colombia. In April 2024, the facelifted Sonet went on sale in China.

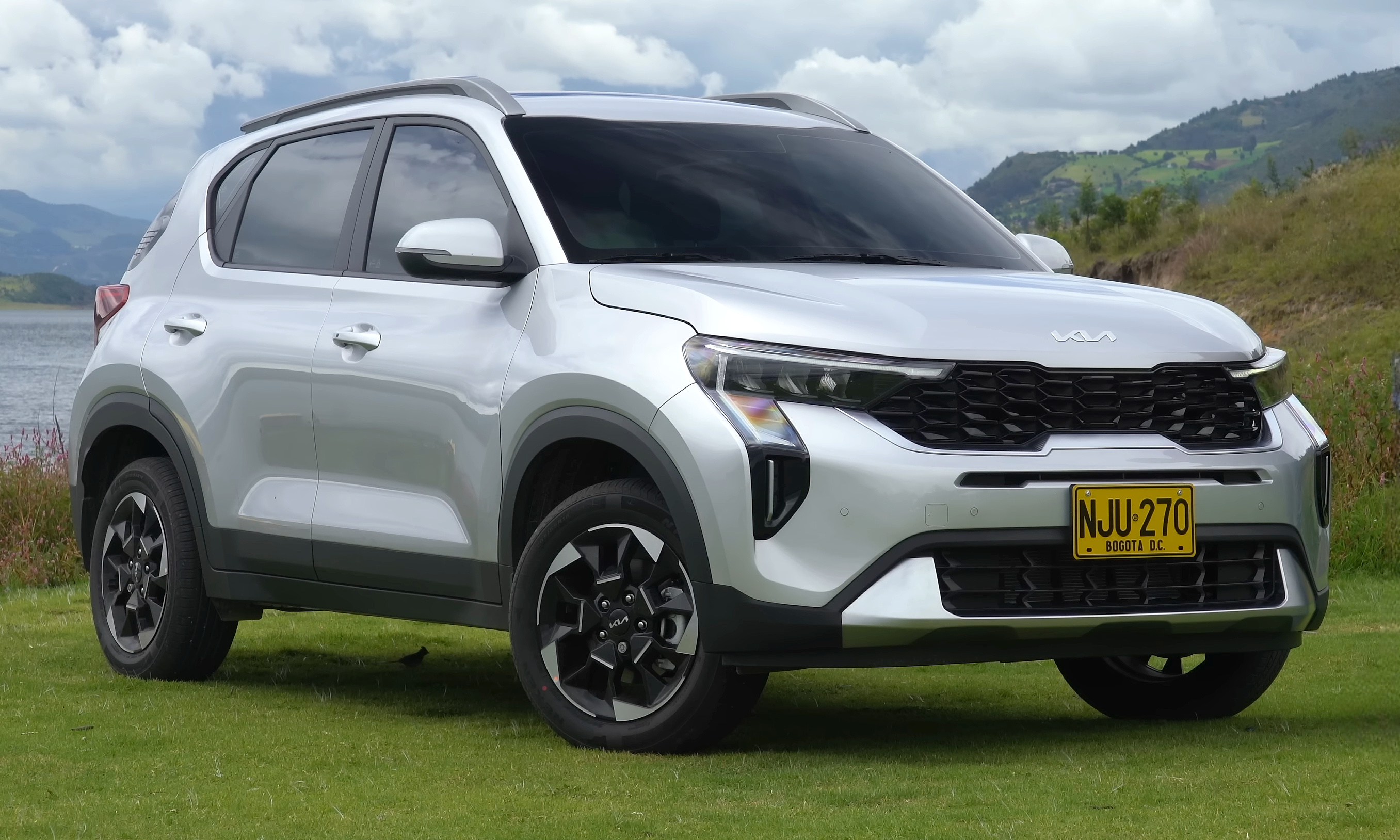
2024 Sonet (facelift)

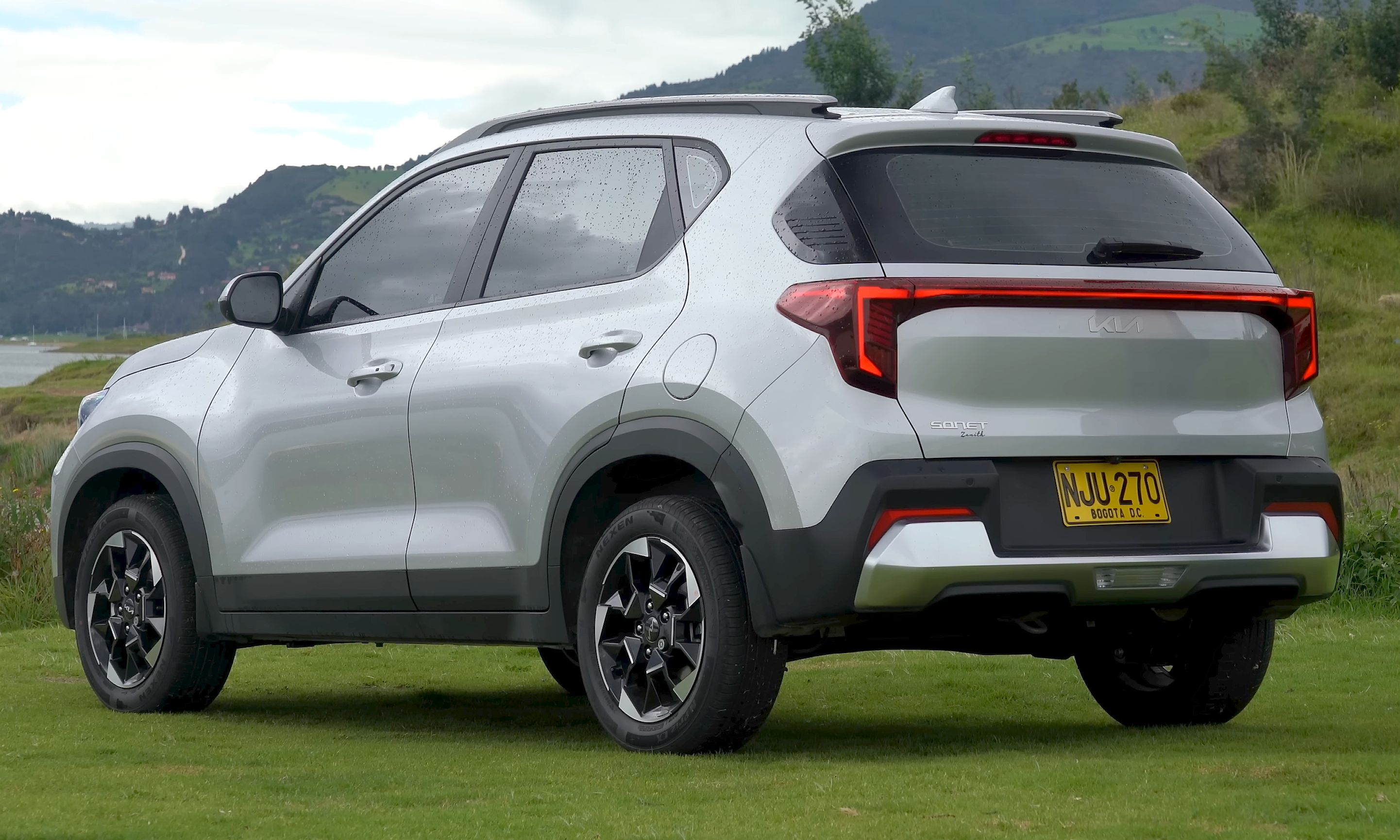
Rear view (facelift)

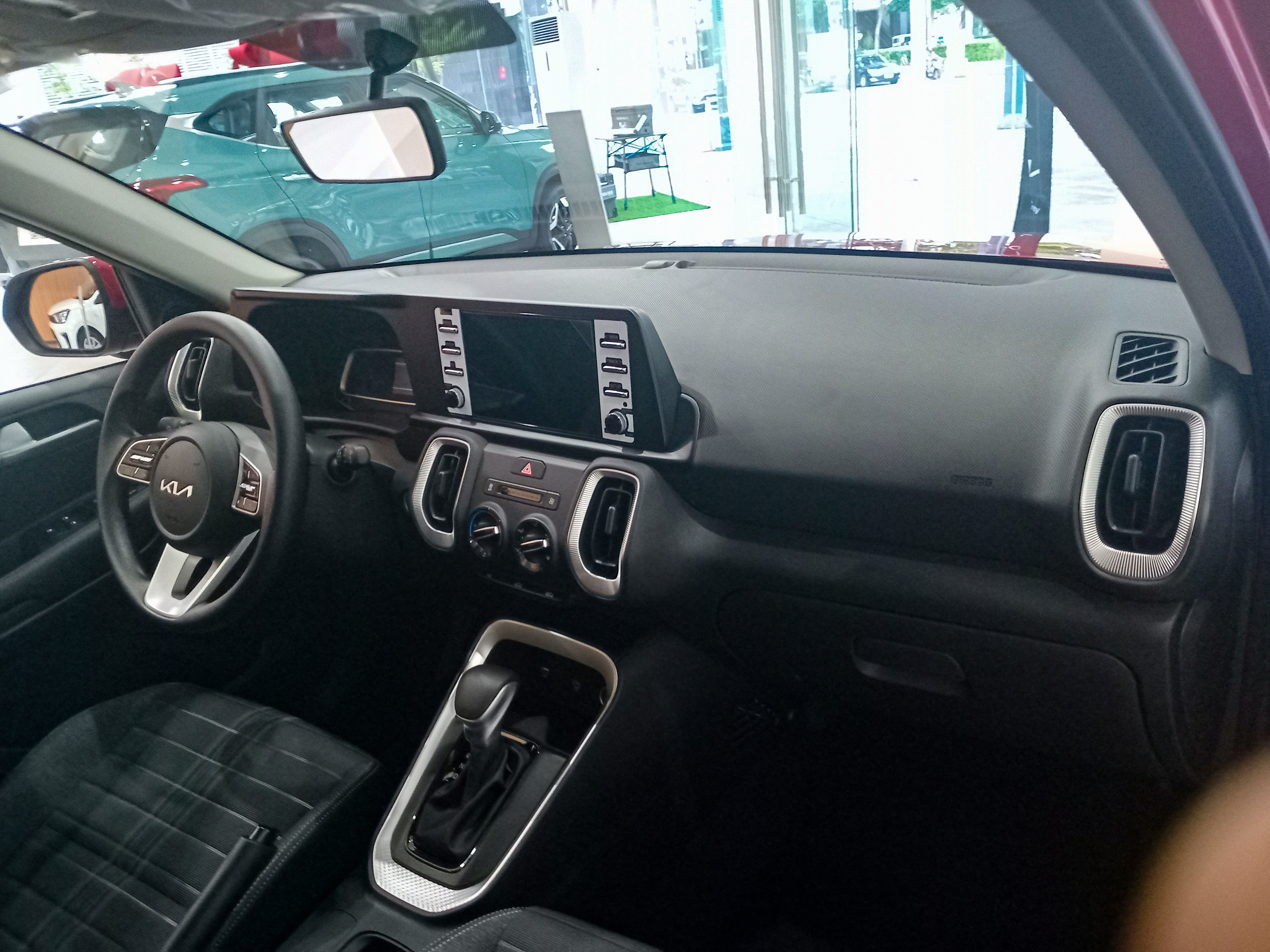
Interior (facelift)

== Markets ==
=== India ===
For the Indian market, the Sonet is available in nine trim levels: HTE, HTE(O), HTK, HTK(O), HTK+, HTK+(O) HTX, GTX+ and X Line. Three engine options are available: a 1.0-litre T-GDi turbocharged petrol, a 1.2-litre MPi petrol and a 1.5-litre CRDi turbocharged diesel. At launch, the GTX+ trim was the variant high in customer demand.

In September 2022, the flagship X-Line trim was introduced which consists of cosmetic changes instead of mechanical changes. It was available with either 1.0 T-GDi petrol or 1.5 CRDi diesel engines.

The facelifted Sonet went on sale in India on 12 January 2024, with the addition of new variants and engine options remain unchanged from the pre-facelift model. By September 2024, the car sold more than 450,000 units in India and export markets.

=== Indonesia ===
The Sonet was launched in Indonesia on 11 November 2020, in five trim levels: Standard, Active, Smart, Dynamic and Premiere; it is powered by a 1.5-litre MPi petrol engine paired to either a manual or an IVT.

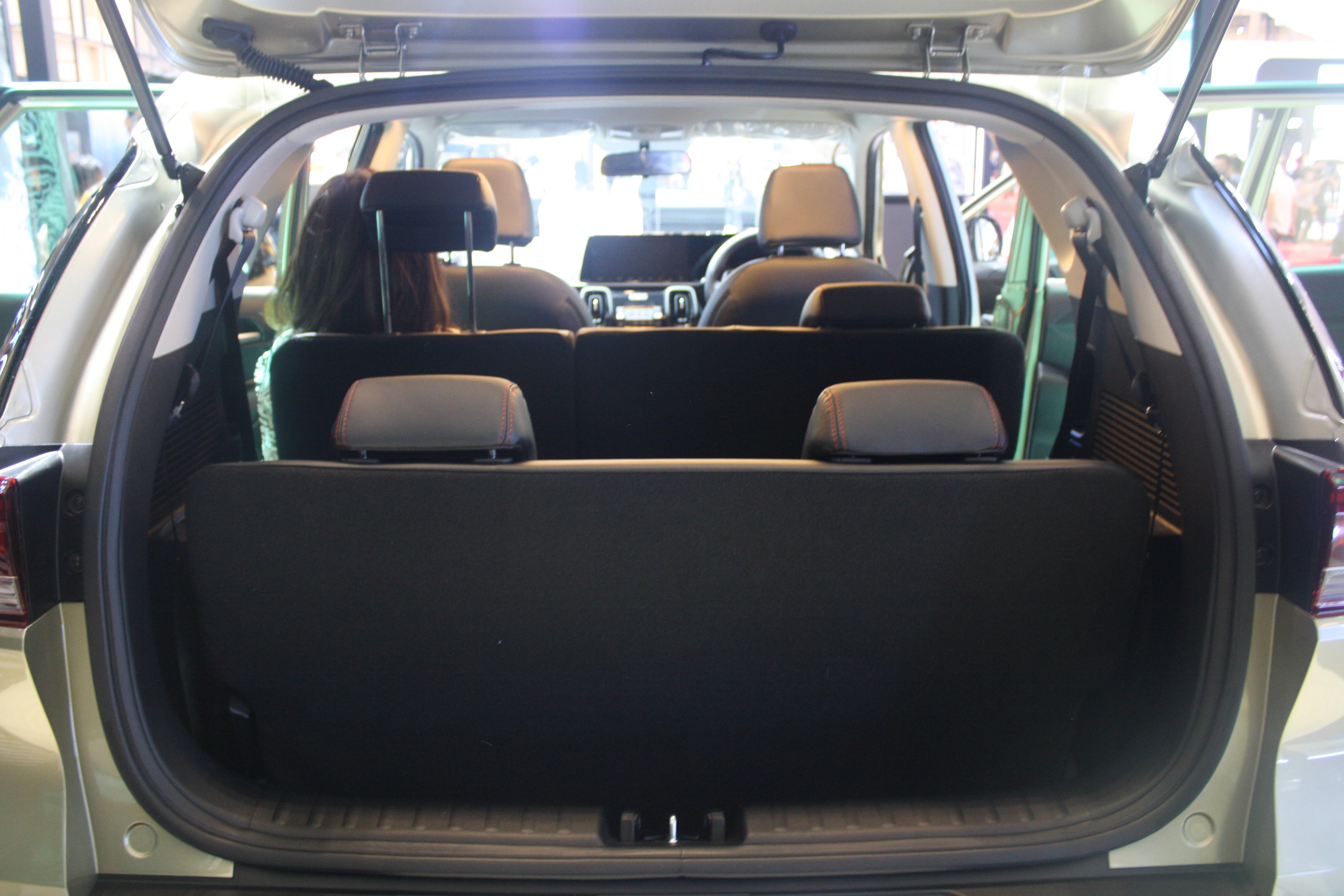
Kia Sonet 7 with third row seats

A version of the Sonet with three-row seating was introduced in Indonesia in April 2021. Marketed as the Sonet 7, the third row bench seat is installed without any exterior bodywork changes, meaning with the third row seat up, the boot space is effectively eliminated. The Sonet 7 is also equipped with a roof-mounted air circulator system, and a revised second row bench seat with split folding and a one-touch folding mechanism which allows access to the third row. The Sonet 7 was discontinued in 2022.

The facelifted Sonet was launched in Indonesia on 25 September 2024 with two trim levels: Premiere and Ultimate; it is powered by a 1.5-litre MPi petrol engine.

=== Mexico ===
The Sonet was launched in Mexico on 16 March 2024, with three trim levels: LX, EX and SX. Imported from China (Yueda Kia), it is powered by a Smartstream G1.5 MPi that produces 113 hp and 144 Nm of torque, paired with either a 6-speed manual transmission (LX) or an IVT (EX and SX).

=== Philippines ===
Three months after its release in Mexico, the Sonet was launched in the Philippines on 6 June 2024, with three trim levels: LX, EX, and SX. Unlike in Mexico, the Philippine-spec Sonet offers both manual and automatic transmissions for the LX variant. It replaced the Stonic. The Sonet is powered by a Smartstream G1.5 MPi, paired with either a 6-speed manual transmission or an IVT. In November 2025, the K-Style Edition variant was made available limited to 150 units.

=== South Africa ===
The Sonet was launched in South Africa on 11 May 2021, with two trim levels: LX and EX; it is powered by a 1.5-litre MPi petrol engine paired to either a manual or an IVT.

In July 2022, the 1.0 T-GDi turbocharged petrol engine was introduced in South Africa and was available in the new EX+ trim.

The facelifted Sonet was launched in South Africa on 14 June 2024, with a new SX trim and the 1.0 T-GDi engine option was only made available for the EX trim. The entry-level LS trim was added to sit below the LX in October 2024. In September 2026, a new LS+ trim (positioned above the LS trim) was introduced and the 1.0 T-GDi turbocharged petrol engine was discontinued, leaving the 1.5-litre MPi petrol engine as the sole engine option.

=== Vietnam ===
The Sonet was launched in Vietnam on 9 October 2021, alongside the fourth-generation Carnival. At launch, three trim levels were available: Deluxe, Luxury and Premium; it is powered by a 1.5-litre MPi petrol engine paired to either a manual (for the Deluxe trim) or an IVT.

The facelifted Sonet was launched in Vietnam on 8 June 2024, with the same trim levels from the pre-facelift model. The entry-level Standard variant using the same 1.5-litre MPi petrol engine from upper trim levels was added in September 2025.

== Engines ==
Petrol engines
Model	Engine	Power	Torque	Transmissions
1.0 L Kappa II T-GDi	998 cc (60.9 cu in) turbocharged I3	120 PS (88 kW; 118 hp) @ 6,000 rpm	172 N⋅m (17.5 kg⋅m; 127 lb⋅ft) @ 1,500–4,000 rpm	6-speed clutchless manual (iMT); 7-speed DCT
Smartstream G1.2 MPi	1,197 cc (73.0 cu in) I4	83 PS (61 kW; 82 hp) @ 6,300 rpm	115 N⋅m (11.7 kg⋅m; 84.8 lb⋅ft) @ 4,200 rpm	5-speed manual
Smartstream G1.5 MPi	1,497 cc (91.4 cu in) I4	115 PS (85 kW; 113 hp) @ 6,300 rpm	144 N⋅m (14.7 kg⋅m; 106 lb⋅ft) @ 4,500 rpm	6-speed manual CVT
Diesel engines
Model	Engine	Power	Torque	Transmissions
1.5 L Smartstream D1.5 CRDi WGT	1,493 cc (91.1 cu in) turbocharged I4	100 PS (74 kW; 99 hp) @ 4,000 rpm	240 N⋅m (24.5 kg⋅m; 177 lb⋅ft) @ 1,500–2,750 rpm	6-speed manual
1.5 L Smartstream D1.5 CRDi VGT	1,493 cc (91.1 cu in) turbocharged I4	115 PS (85 kW; 113 hp) @ 4,000 rpm	250 N⋅m (25.5 kg⋅m; 184 lb⋅ft) @ 1,500–2,750 rpm	6-speed automatic

== Safety ==
The Kia Sonet has not yet undergone official crash testing by Global NCAP or Bharat NCAP, so its safety rating remains unknown. However, considering that other Kia models like the Kia Carens and Kia Seltos have received 3-star ratings from Global NCAP, and given Kia's aim for a 5-star rating with the Sonet based on its safety features, it's expected that the Sonet could achieve a similar or better score.

Global NCAP 2.5 test results (Africa) Kia Sonet (2026, similar to Latin NCAP 2019)
Test	Score	Stars
Adult occupant protection	21.29/34.00	1 /5 stars
Child occupant protection	28.57/49.00	3 /5 stars

== Sales ==
Year	India	South Africa	Vietnam	Indonesia	Colombia	Saudi Arabia	UAE	Mexico	Philippines	China
2020	38,363									
2021	79,289	2,471	1,729	2,321	319	1,411				
2022	86,251	3,319	9,446	1,388	1,502	2,695	307			
2023	79,776	6,511	11,366	661	1,633	1,158	398			
2024	102,337	7,425	7,313	457				9,996	3,823	640
