= Donghee =

Automotive parts manufacturer

Donghee Holdings Co. Ltd.
- Native name: 동희홀딩스
- Industry: Automotive parts manufacturer
- Founded: February 1972
- Founder: Lee Dong-Ho
- Headquarters: Suwon, South Korea; Ulsan, South Korea
- Key people: President: Lee Dong-Ho; Vice-president: Shin Seon-shik
- Products: Auto parts and consigned manufacture
- Website: en.donghee.co.kr

Donghee Holdings Co. Ltd. is a South Korean group of companies producing various automotive parts such as chassis, fuel tanks, pedal parts, sunroofs, axle housings and body panels. Donghee Auto Co. Ltd., one of its subsidiaries, co-manufactures the Kia Picanto in a joint venture plant with Kia.

== History ==
Donghee was established in 1972 as Dongseung Co. Ltd. to produce automotive bumper and pedal parts. In 1986, Donghee Industrial Co. Ltd. was established in Ulsan with the assistance of Hyundai Motor Company. A year later, Donghee formed a joint venture with German firm Webasto to locally manufacture sunroof parts as Webasto Donghee (formerly Korea Sunroof Co. Ltd.). Donghee Auto Co. Ltd. was established in 2002 as a joint venture with Kia to manufacture the Kia Picanto in Seosan. In 2023, Kia moved production of the Kia Stonic from Gwangmyeong to Seosan, as the Gwangmyeong plant was being retooled for EV production.

Outside Korea, Donghee has manufacturing plants in China, Czech Republic, Slovakia, Turkey, Russia, and The United States.

== Vehicles ==
=== Current models ===
- Kia Morning (2004–present)
- Kia Ray (crossover) (2011–present)
- Kia Stonic (2023–present)

=== Discontinued models ===
- Kia Niro Plus (2022–2024)
