= Hyundai Elantra =

Compact car

Hyundai Elantra/Avante
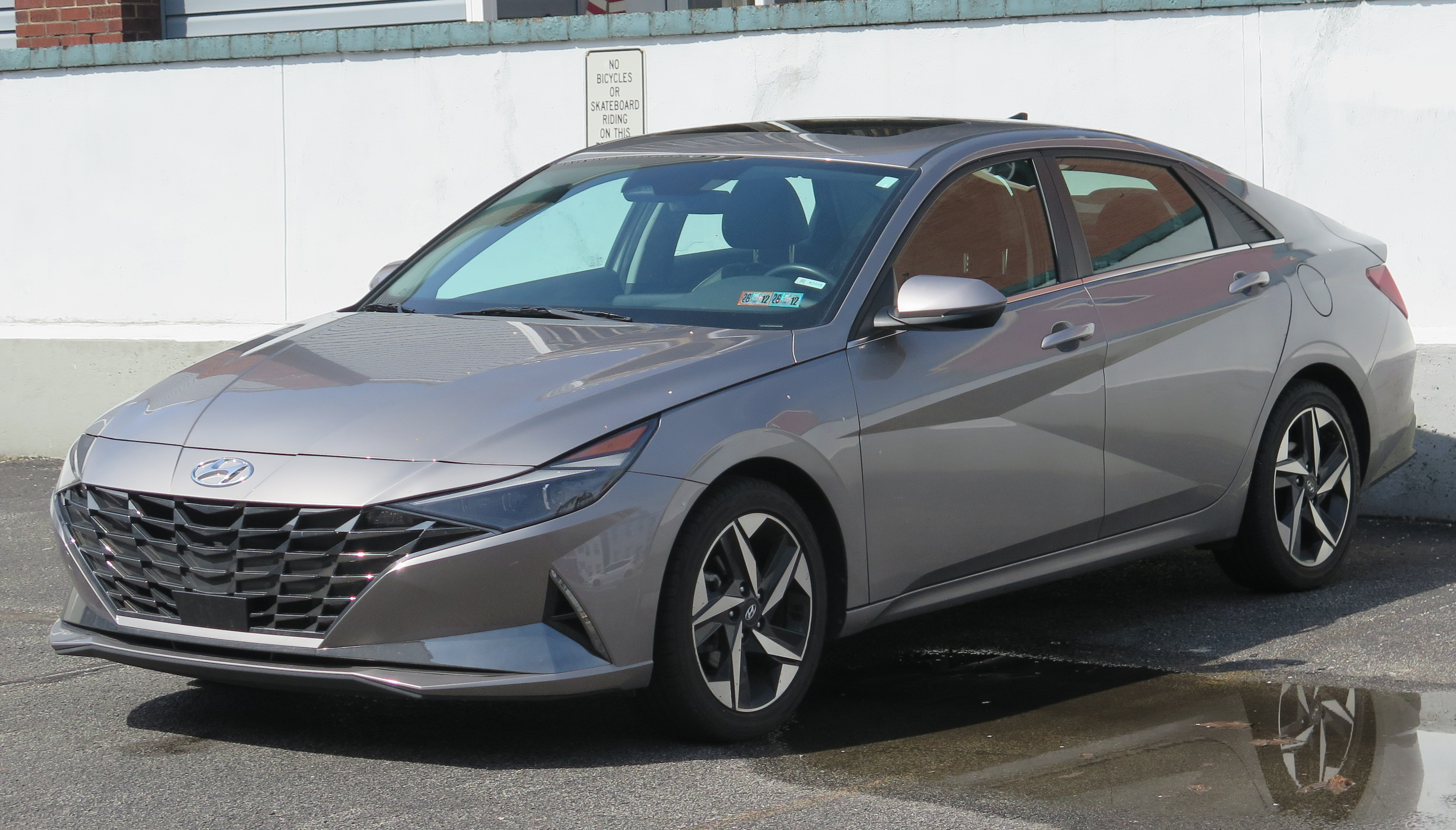
- Seventh generation Elantra (CN7)

Overview
- Manufacturer: Hyundai
- Also called: Hyundai Avante; Hyundai Lantra (1990–2000, Australia and Europe); Hyundai i30 Sedan (2020–present, Australia)
- Production: 1990–present

Body and chassis
- Class: Compact car (C)
- Layout: Front-engine, front-wheel-drive

Chronology
- Predecessor: Hyundai Stellar (South Korea)

The Hyundai Elantra (Korean: 현대 엘란트라), also known as the Hyundai Avante (Korean: 현대 아반떼), is a series of compact cars produced by the South Korean manufacturer Hyundai since 1990.

In South Korea, the first-generation model was initially sold under the "Elantra" nameplate, but starting from the second-generation, Korean models were sold under the "Avante" nameplate, with the "Elantra" name continue to be used on export models. The "Avante" name is not used in most export markets due to its similarity with Audi's "Avant" designation, used for their station wagon models. As of 2018, Singapore is the only export market outside South Korea to utilize the "Avante" name.

In Australia and some European markets, the Elantra was initially marketed as the Lantra during its first two generations, due to the similarly named "Elante" trim for the Mitsubishi Magna in the former market, and the Lotus Elan in the latter. After Mitsubishi Motors Australia Limited (MMAL) dropped the "Elante" trim from the Magna range, and Lotus ceased production of the Elan in 1995, Hyundai standardized the "Elantra" name for both Australian and European markets in 2001, following the introduction of the third-generation model.

The first-generation model was also sold as the Bimantara Nenggala in Indonesia between 1995 and 1998. Since the seventh-generation, the "Elantra" name was retired in Australia, when Hyundai integrated it into the i30 range, badging it as the i30 Sedan.

== First generation (J1; 1990) ==
First generation
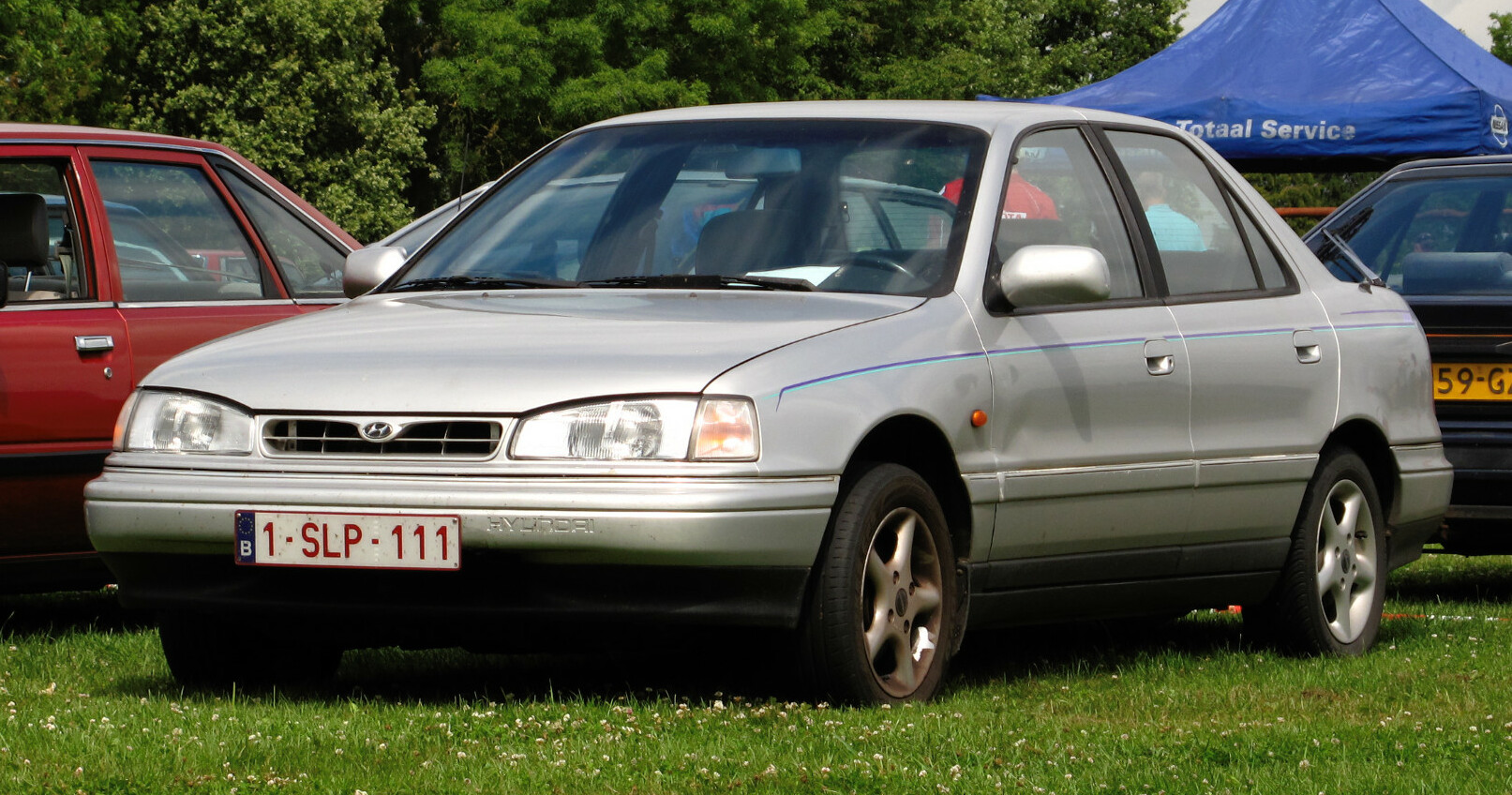

Overview
- Model code: J1
- Also called: Hyundai Lantra (Australia, Europe); Bimantara Nenggala (Indonesia)
- Production: 1990–1995; 1996–1998 (Indonesia)
- Assembly: South Korea: Ulsan; Indonesia: Bekasi

Body and chassis
- Body style: 4-door sedan
- Related: Mitsubishi Mirage

Powertrain
- Engine: Gasoline: 1468 cc G4DJ I4; 1497 cc G4CL DOHC I4; 1595 cc G4CR DOHC I4; 1796 cc G4CM I4; 1836 cc G4CN DOHC I4
- Transmission: 5-speed manual 4-speed automatic

Dimensions
- Wheelbase: 2,500 mm (98.4 in)
- Length: 4,375 mm (172.2 in) (1990–1993); 4,405 mm (173.4 in) (1993–1995)
- Width: 1,675 mm (65.9 in) (1990–1993); 1,680 mm (66.1 in) (1993–1995)
- Height: 1,395 mm (54.9 in) (1990–1993); 1,390 mm (54.7 in) (1993–1995)
- Curb weight: 1,064–1,187 kg (2,346–2,617 lb)

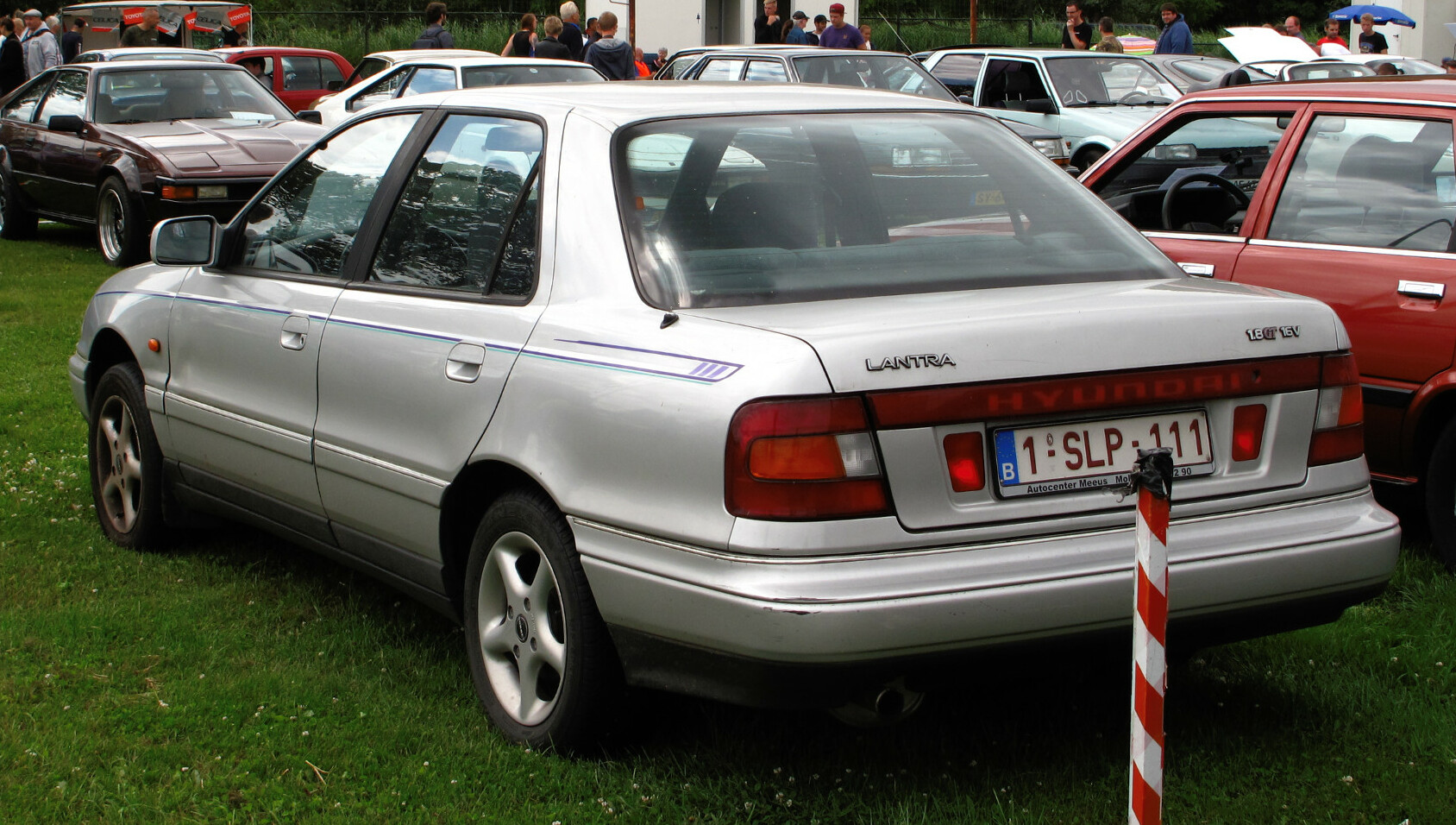
Rear (pre-facelift)

The Elantra (codename J1) was launched in October 1990, and received a mid-term facelift in 1993.

It was sold in Europe from the spring of 1991. It replaced the somewhat larger on the outside Stellar, although that model had not been offered in many markets. The Elantra competed with the likes of the Ford Sierra and Vauxhall Cavalier/Opel Vectra, but at a considerably lower price.

The Elantra was powered by a Mitsubishi-designed 1.6 L (1595 cc) straight-four. This DOHC 16-valve 1.6 L unit produced 113 PS (83 kW) at 6000 rpm and could push the Elantra to 60 mph (97 km/h) in 9.5 seconds. The quarter-mile (0.4 km) run took 17.1 seconds and produced 129 km/h (80 mph). Top speed was 187 km/h (116 mph). The Elantra got 22 mpg_{‑US} (11 L/100 km) in the city cycle. Starting with the 1993 facelift a Mitsubishi-designed 1.8 L (1836 cc) inline-four option was available; this unit produces 135 PS (99 kW) at 6000 rpm and replaced the twin-cam 1.6 in many markets. A twin-cam, 1.5-litre engine was introduced at the same time, mainly for the domestic market where 1.5 litres marked a major tax threshold.

=== Facelifts ===
The vehicle was refreshed in 1992 for the European market, swapping for Hyundai's updated logo to the grille - although North American models retained the previous year's look. In April 1993, the vehicle received a facelift, including revised front and rear fascias including new, more organically shaped head- and taillights. The vehicle now also featured ABS brakes, front airbags, fog lamps, power-operated side mirrors, and optional alloy seven-spoke wheels.

Between 1996 and 1998, the facelifted version of the first-generation Elantra was also produced and sold for the Indonesian market as the Bimantara Nenggala. It was unveiled in July 1996 along with the Bimantara Cakra. It is only available in there with 1.6 L engine and paired in manual and automatic transmission options.

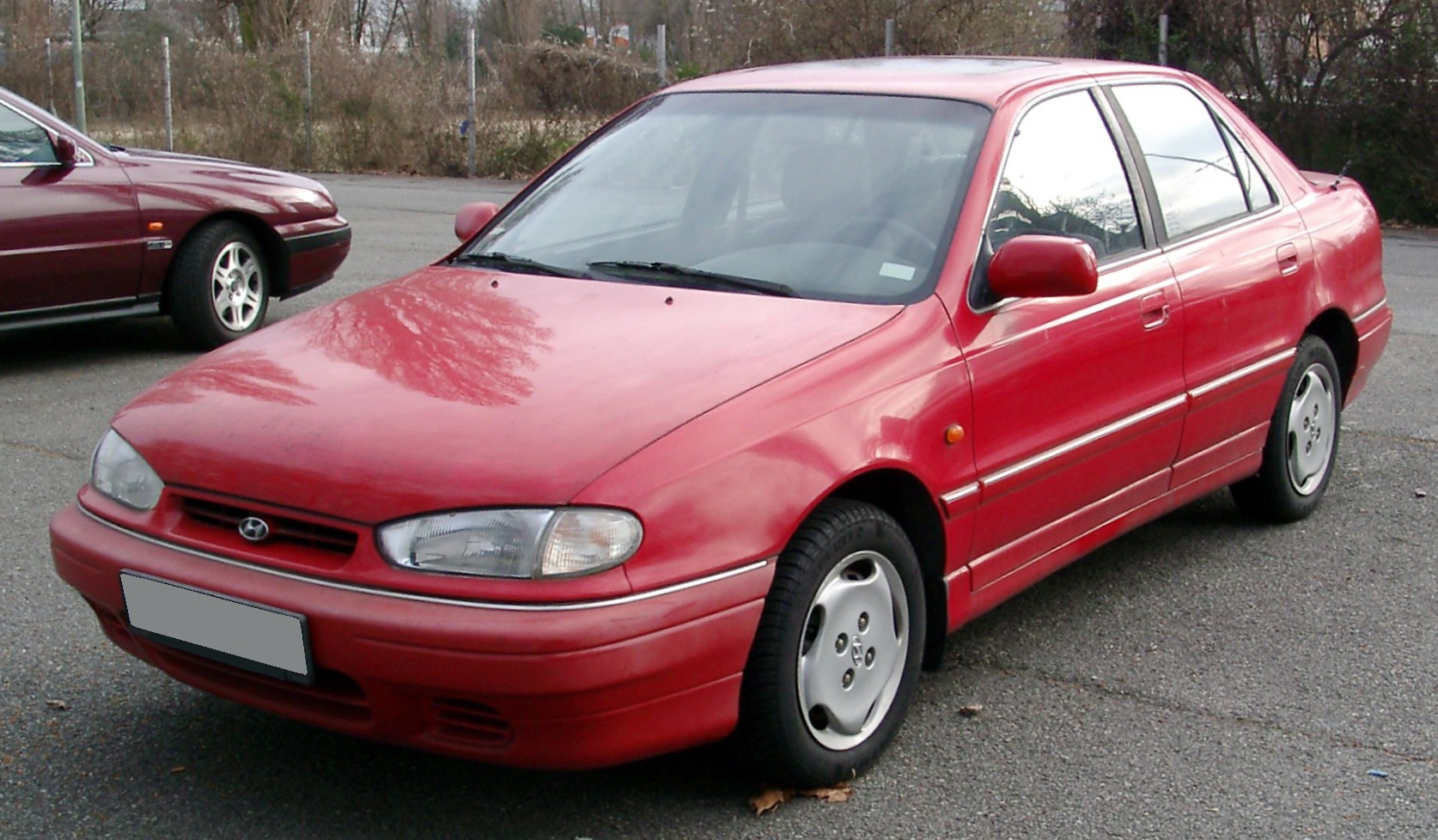
Facelift (front view)

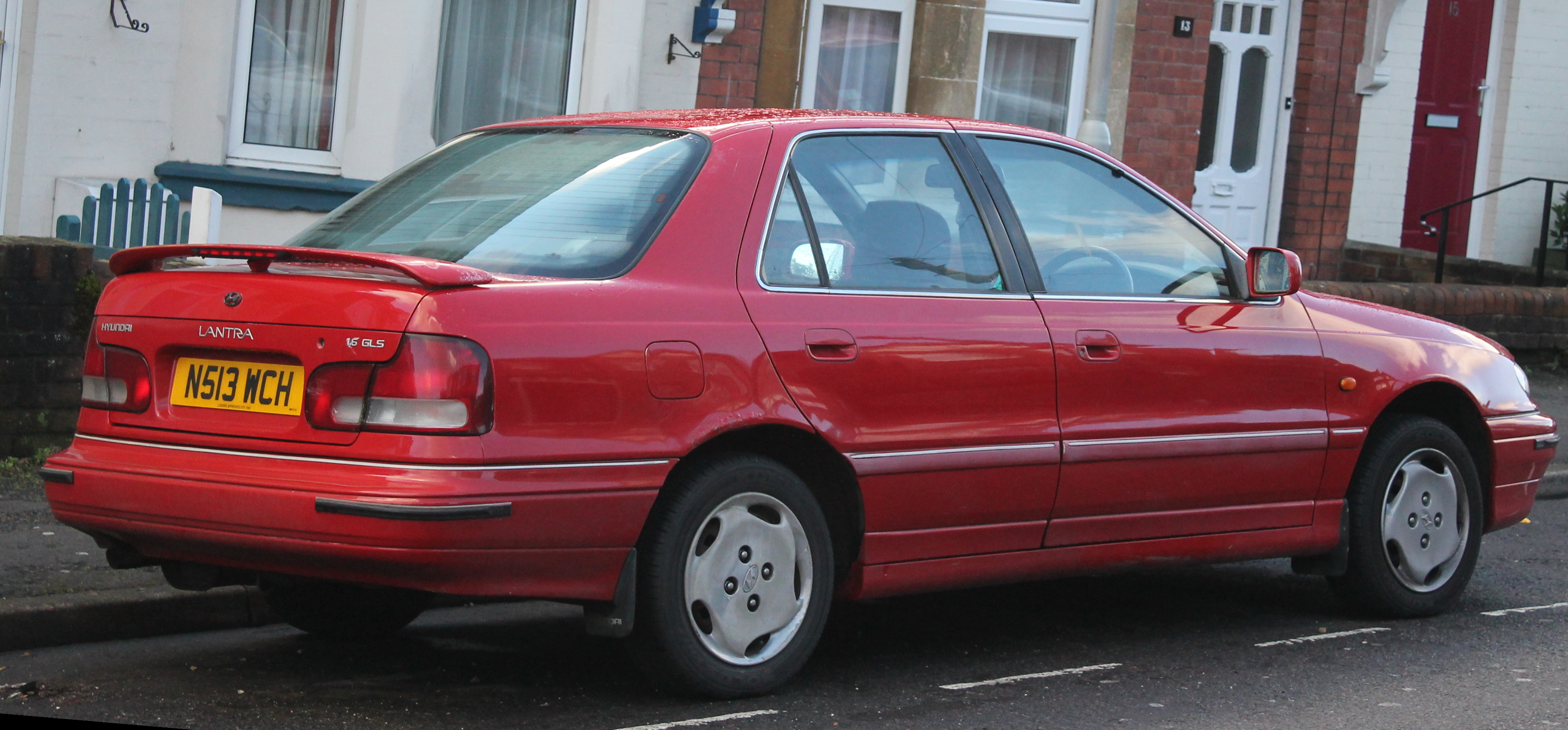
Facelift (rear view)

== Second generation (J2/J3/RD; 1995) ==
Second generation
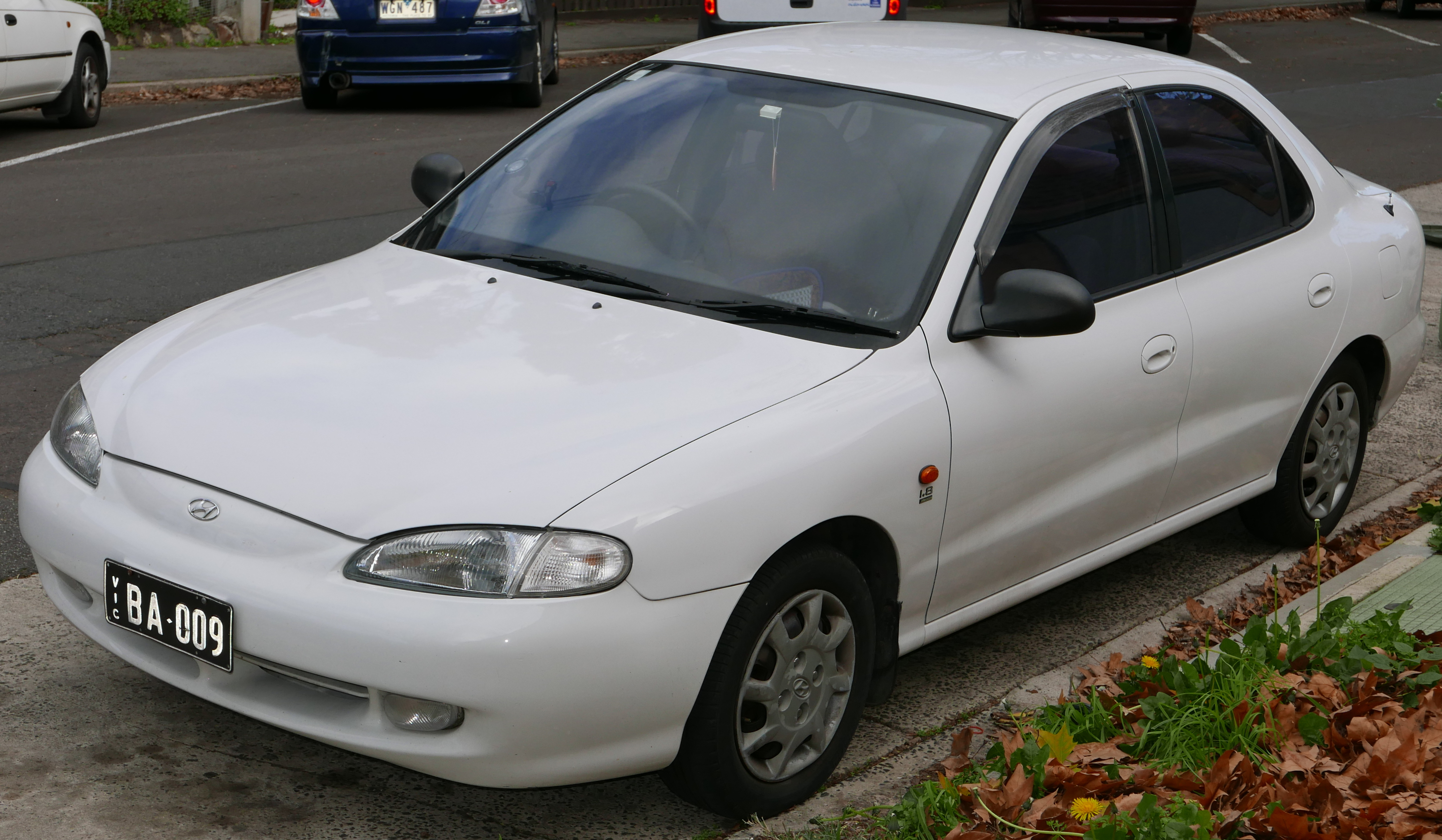

Overview
- Model code: J2; RD
- Also called: Hyundai Avante (South Korea); Hyundai Lantra (Australia, Europe)
- Production: 1995–2000
- Model years: 1996–2000
- Assembly: South Korea: Ulsan; Botswana: Gaborone (TMBC)
- Designer: Choi Jong-Min

Body and chassis
- Body style: 4-door sedan 5-door station wagon
- Related: Hyundai Tiburon

Powertrain
- Engine: Petrol: 1.5 L G4EK/G4FK I4; 1.6 L G4GR I4; 1.8 L G4GM I4; 2.0 L G4GF I4; Diesel: 1.9 L PSA XUD9 I4
- Transmission: 5-speed manual 4-speed automatic

Dimensions
- Wheelbase: 2,550 mm (100.4 in)
- Length: 4,420 mm (174.0 in) (1995–1998 sedan); 4,450 mm (175.2 in) (1995–1998 wagon); 4,450 mm (175.2 in) (1998–2000 sedan); 4,515 mm (177.8 in) (1998–2000 wagon)
- Width: 1,700 mm (66.9 in) (1995–1998); 1,735 mm (68.3 in) (1998–2000)
- Height: 1,395 mm (54.9 in); 1,460 mm (57.5 in) (1998–2000 wagon)

The second generation (codename RD or J2) was launched in March 1995, initially offered as a sedan and six months later also as a station wagon. It was sold in the South Korean market as the "Hyundai Avante" in sedan form and "Avante Touring" in the wagon body style. Some export markets such as Australia and a number of European countries received the series as the "Hyundai Lantra" as per the first generation. The Lantra went on sale in Europe in September 1995, typically fitted with the 1.6-litre Beta DOHC engine, which was not offered in South Korea. Australian-market wagons were given the "Lantra Sportswagon" name.

As per Chief Designer Choi Jong-min, the new, grilleless organic design was inspired by Korean blue and white pottery. The suspension was developed with the aid of a recently acquired Cray super computer and used MacPherson struts up front and a multi-link, coil sprung rear axle. European testers complained that the steering was imprecise and the seat squabs and backs were insufficient for taller drivers; ample equipment, a powerful engine, and a low price made up for this.

In the domestic South Korean market, the new Avante was initially sold alongside the previous Elantra (J1). Aimed at a more affluent buyer, the Avante was only available with the more powerful, twin-cam 1.5-litre Alpha II or 1.8-litre Beta engines. Power outputs were 107 and 138 PS (79 and 101 kW; 106 and 136 hp) respectively, both at 6,000 rpm. In October 1996, power outputs increased marginally, to 110 and 140 PS (81 and 103 kW; 108 and 138 hp).

The 1.6-litre engine initially used in Europe came in two different power outputs; German buyers had the option of a lower-powered variant to suit that country's insurance and taxation system. Power outputs are either 90 or 114 PS (66 or 84 kW; 89 or 112 hp). The 1.6-liter engine also met Germany's D3 emissions requirements (a voluntary standard situated between Euro 3 and Euro 4), which gave it a temporary tax exemption in that market. Some export markets also received the 1.8-litre DOHC engine; its DIN-rated output was 128 PS (94 kW; 126 hp) at 6,100 rpm. A lower-cost, single-cam version of the 1.5 Alpha engine entered production for some export markets in July 1996; this version produces 88 PS (65 kW; 87 hp) at 5,500 rpm.

In the North American market, the J2 Elantra was initially equipped with the 1.8-litre Beta engine with 130 hp (97 kW; 132 PS) at 6,000 rpm and 122 lb⋅ft (165 N⋅m) at 5,000 rpm.

Some importers also offered a faux, chrome grille with vertical bars in 1997 and 1998. In Australia, this grille was only installed on the Lantra Classique special edition.

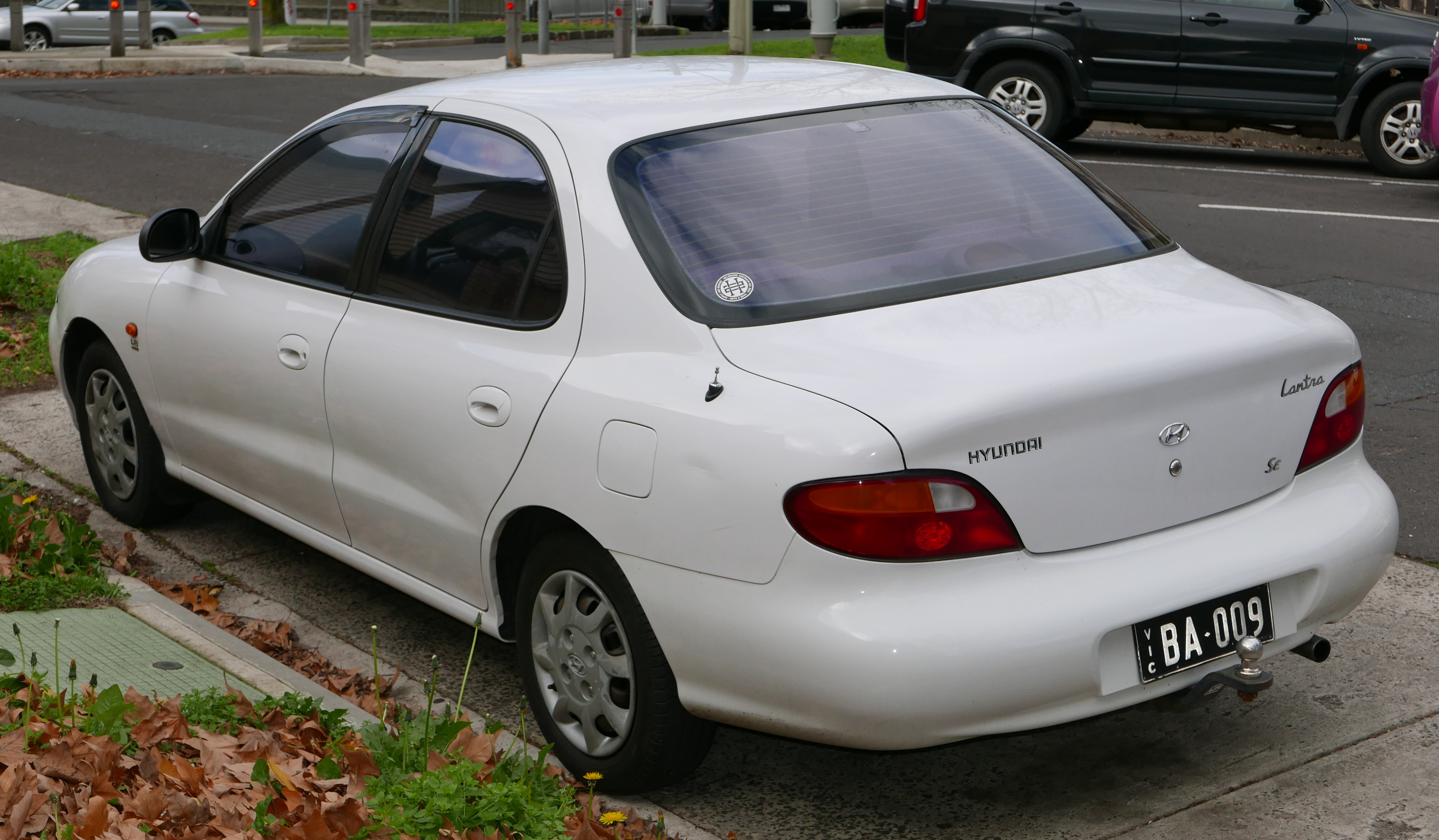
Sedan (pre-facelift)

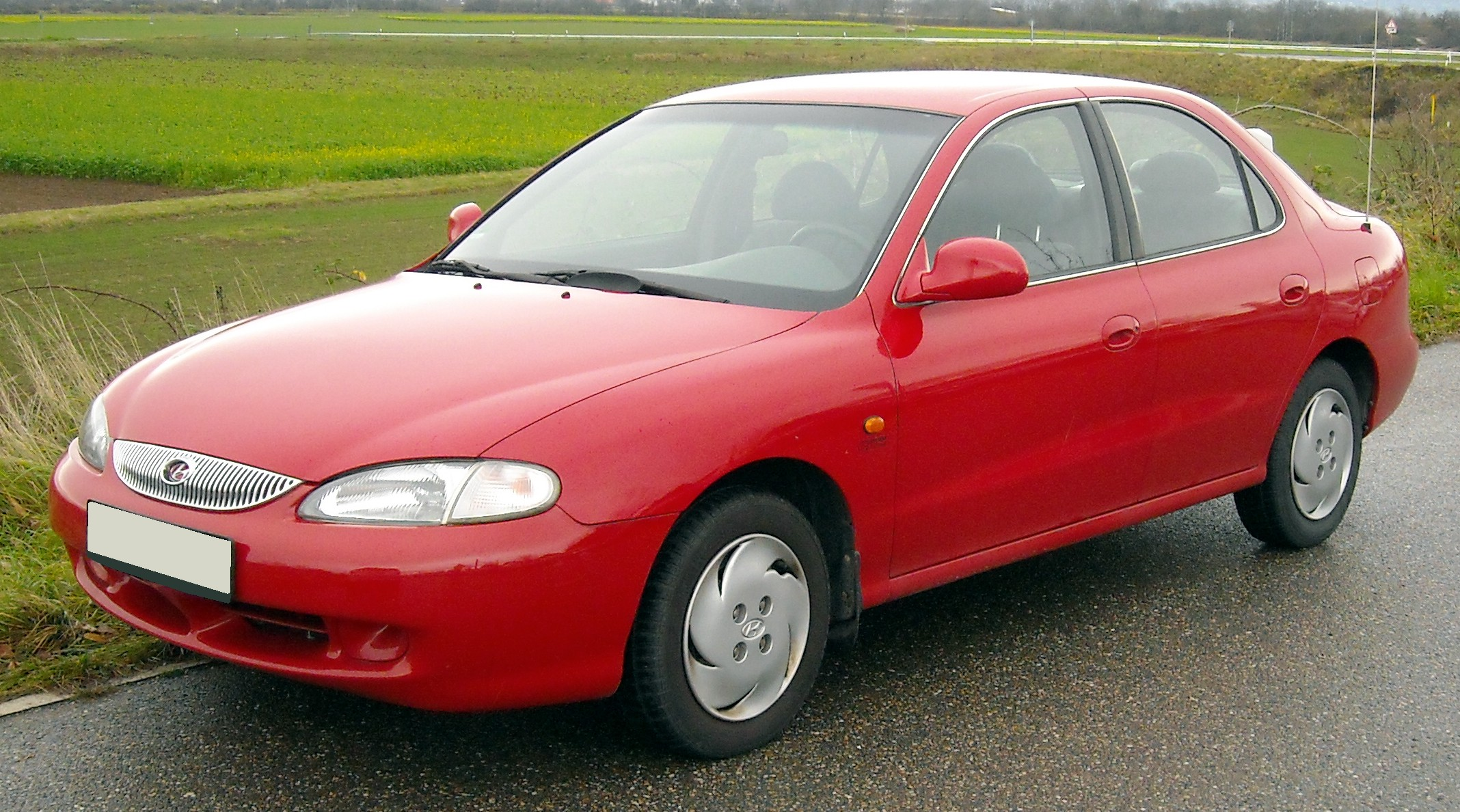
Some models in some years received a faux, chrome grille

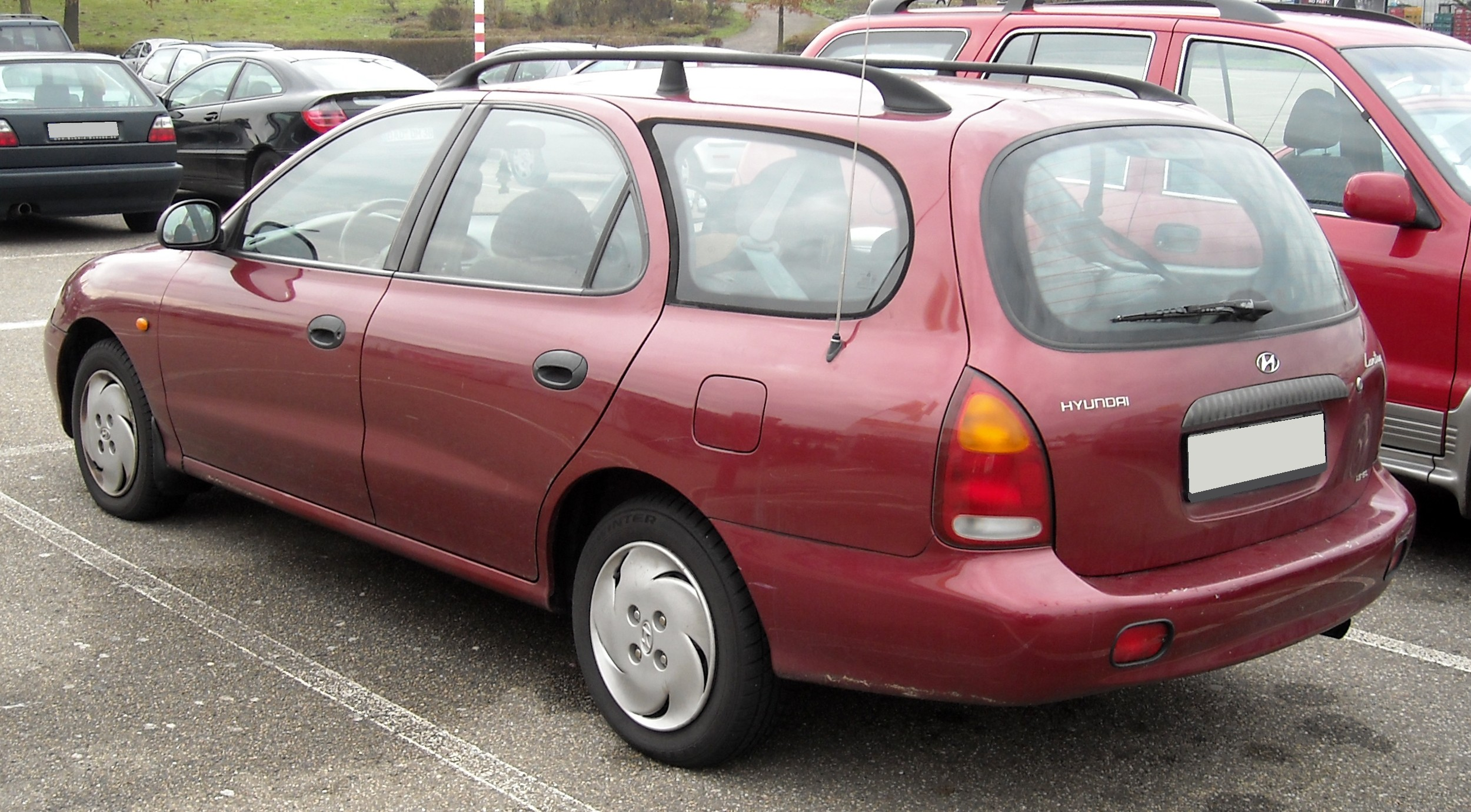
Wagon (pre-facelift)

=== Facelift ===
A new grille arrived in February 1998, along with revised bumpers and redesigned head- and taillights. The facelift variant arrived in Europe in September 1998. The new model, sold as the "New Avante" in South Korea, received the "RD2" or "J3" model codes. Power outputs were adjusted downwards, to 104 and 133 PS (76 and 98 kW; 103 and 131 hp) for the 1.5 and 1.8 DOHC engines used in South Korea. The PSA-built 1.9 L XUD9 naturally aspirated diesel option was also added for some European markets at this time, producing 68 PS (50 kW). South Korean customers gained the option of a fuel efficient, lean-burn version of the 1.5 DOHC engine with 95 PS (70 kW; 94 hp) - this was only available on the Avante sedan.

A new 2.0 L engine option also became available, replacing the earlier 1.8 in most export markets. Power for the 2.0 is 139 PS DIN (102 kW; 137 hp) at 6,000 rpm. In Australia, the GLS model was an upgrade on the GL model and offered the 2.0 L engine, velour trim, softer cloth seats, and alloy wheels. The GLS had body-coloured rear license plate light holder and exterior side-view mirrors.

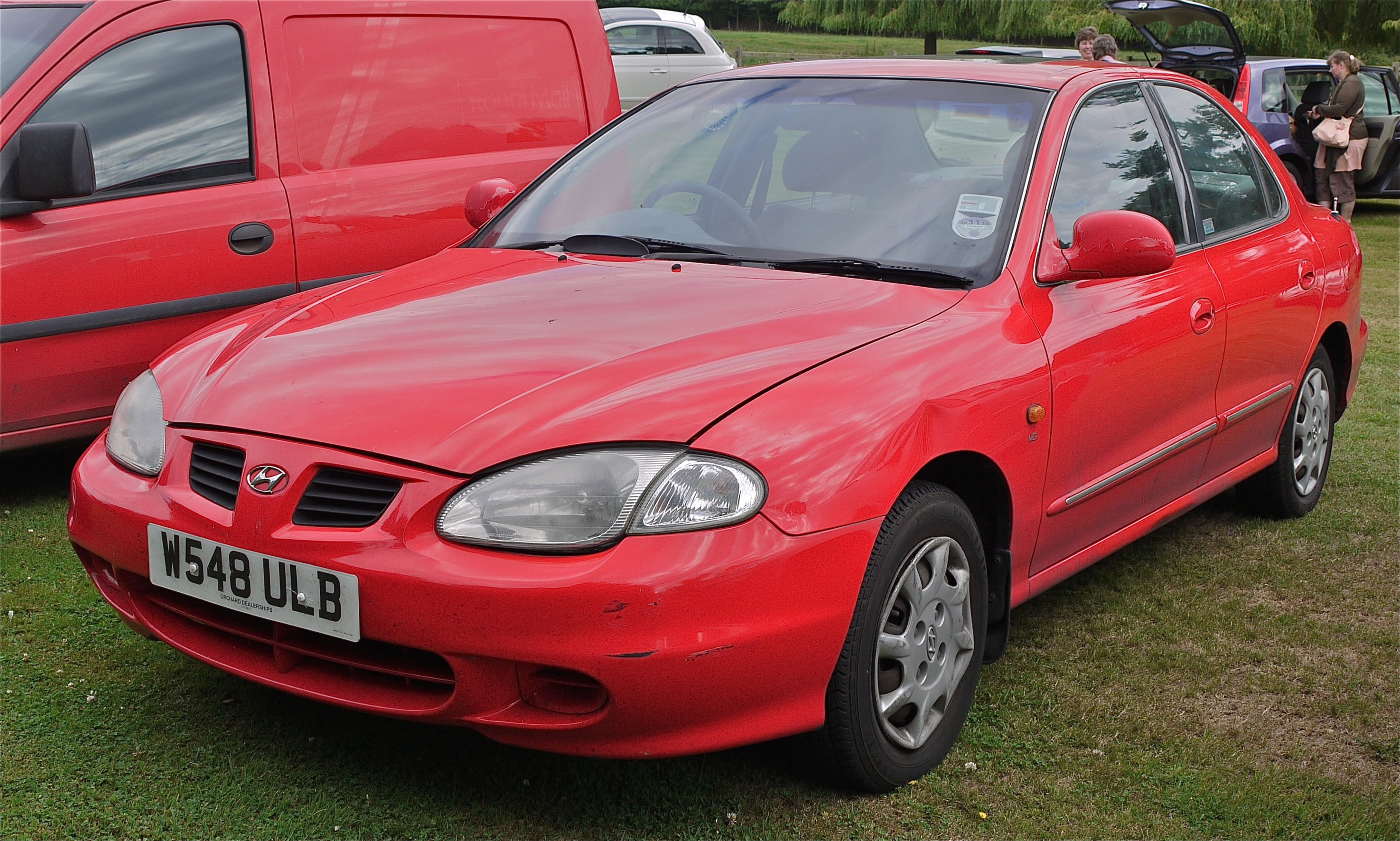
Sedan (facelift)

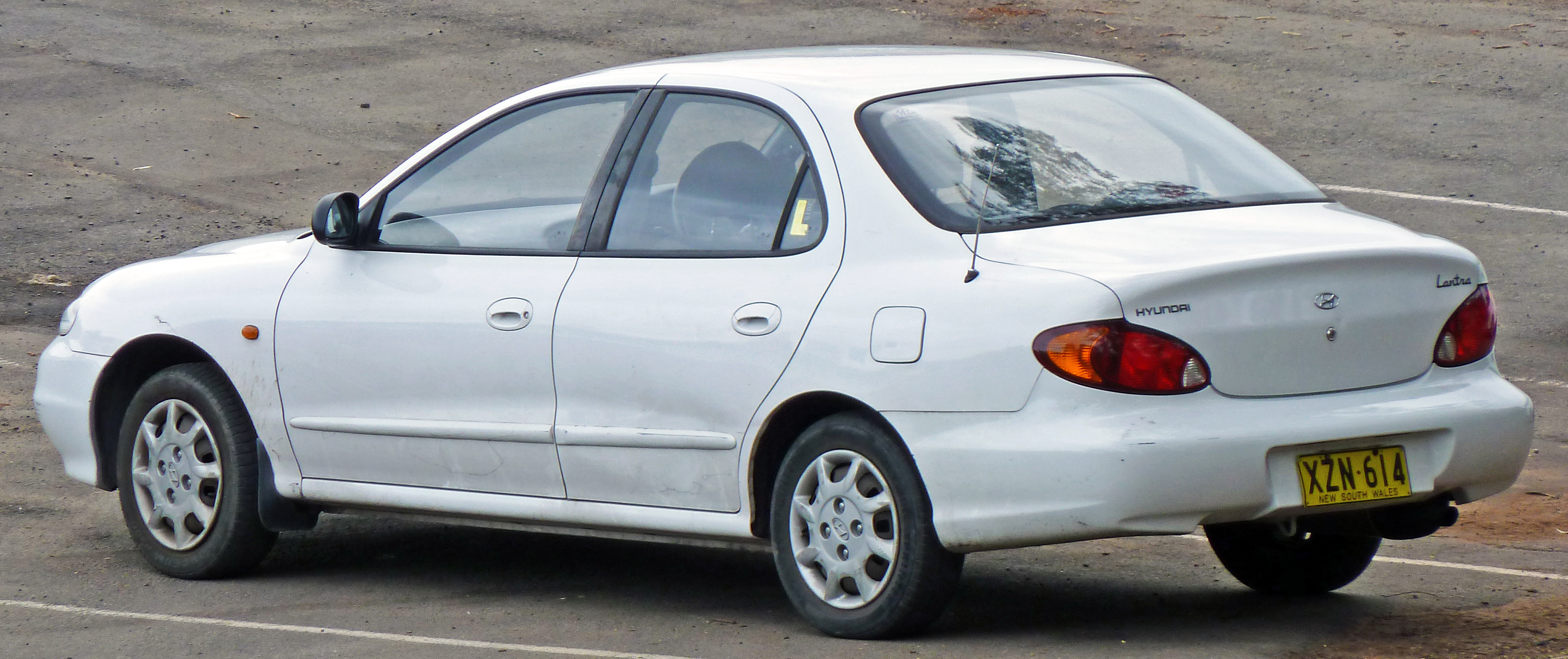
Sedan (facelift)

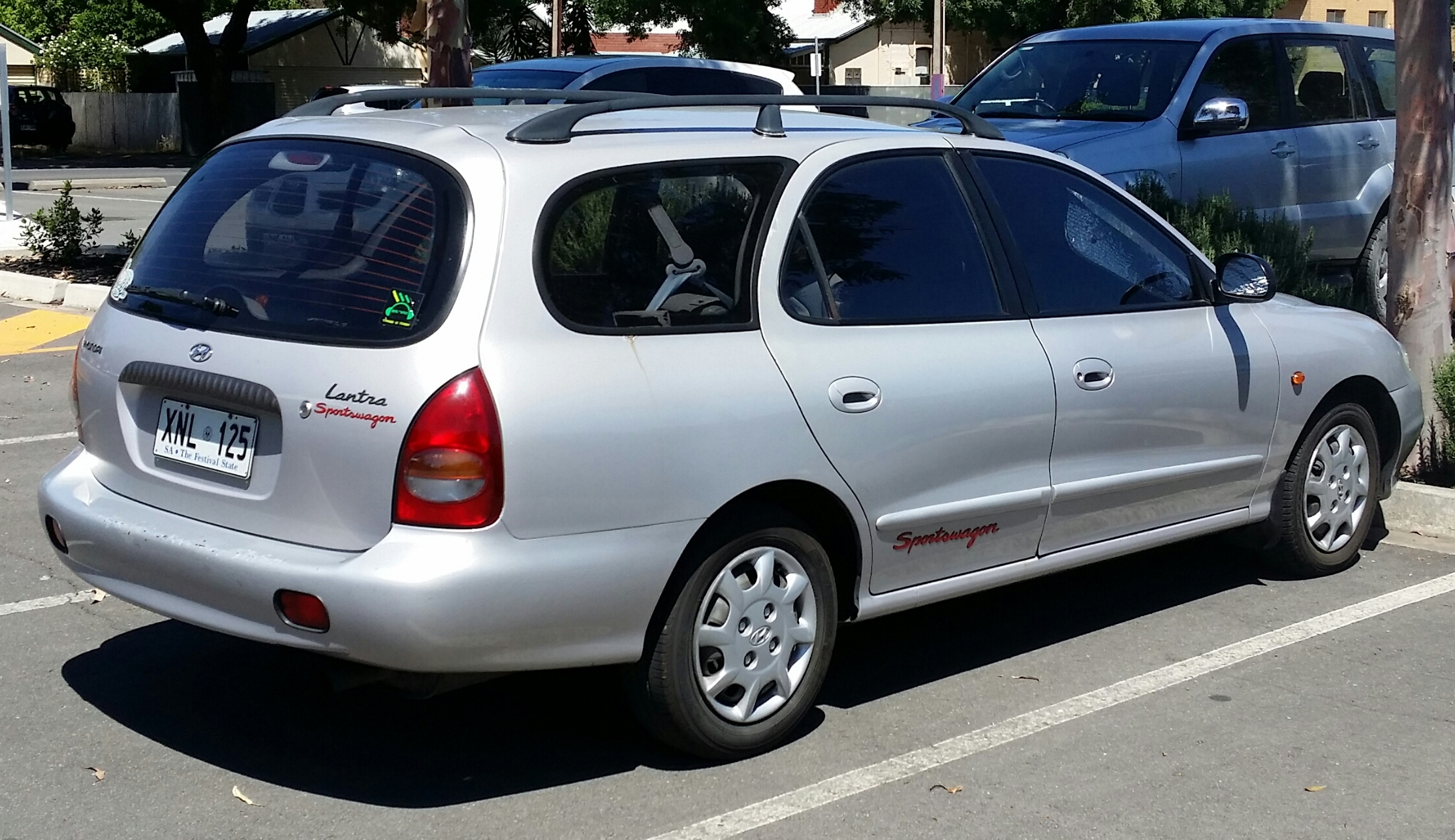
Wagon (facelift)

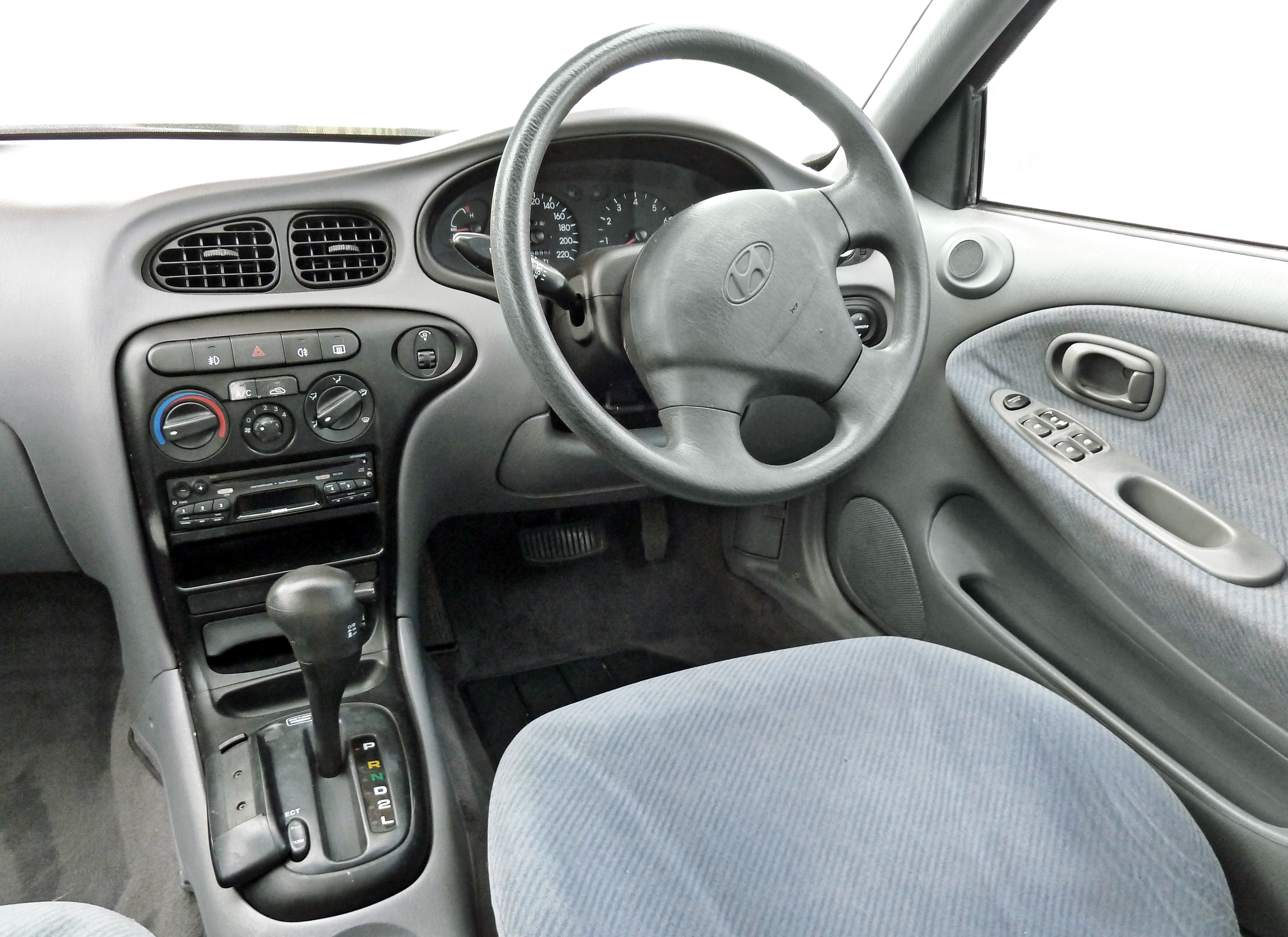
Interior (facelift)

== Third generation (XD; 2000) ==
Third generation
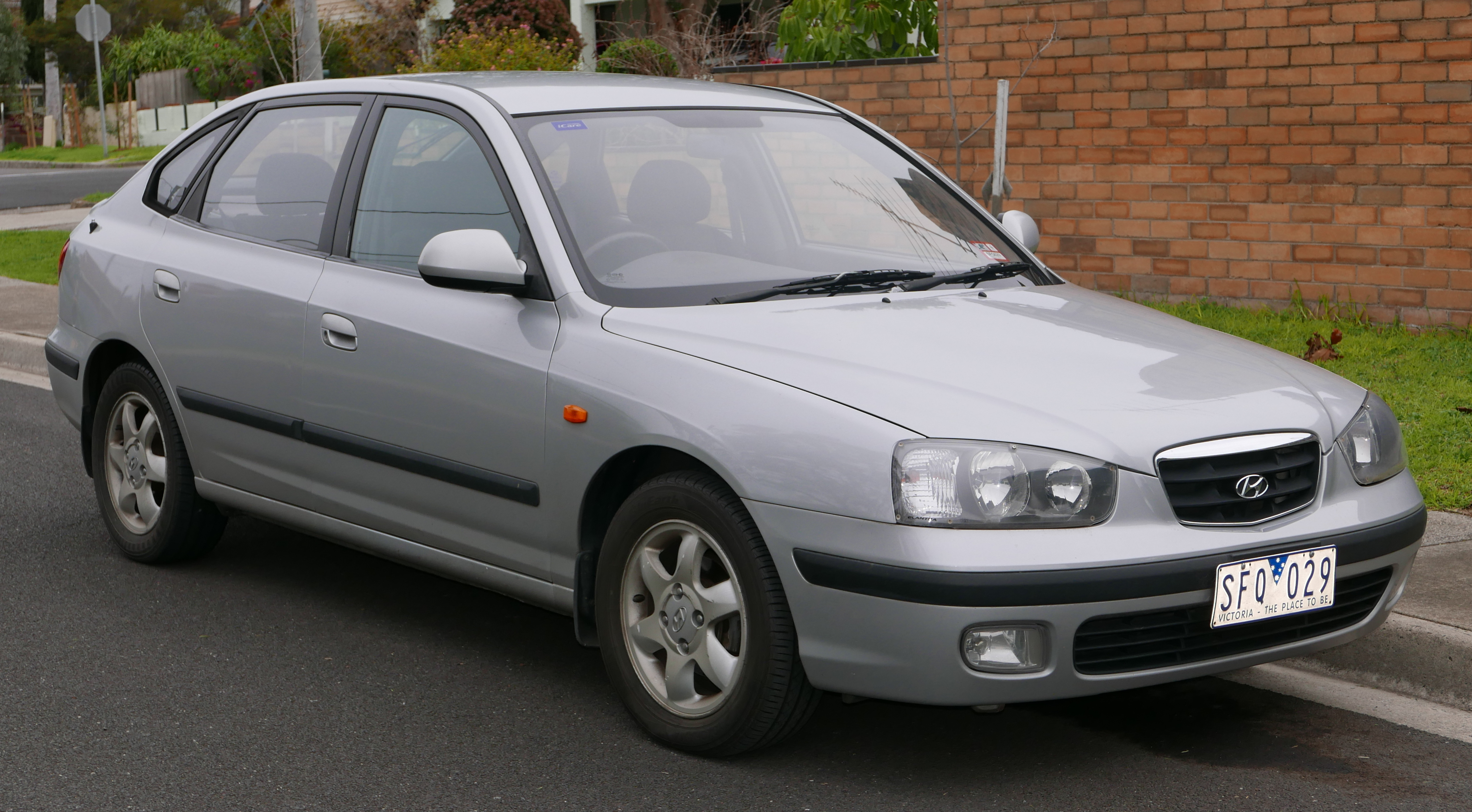

Overview
- Model code: XD
- Also called: Hyundai Avante XD (South Korea)
- Production: 2000–2006 (South Korea); 2001–2012 (Venezuela); 2003–2014 (China); 2004–2010 (India); 2005–2012 (Iran); 2008–2009 (Russia)
- Model years: 2001–2006
- Assembly: South Korea: Ulsan; China: Beijing (Beijing Hyundai); Iran: Kerman (RVMCO); Malaysia: Johor Bahru (OASB); Russia: Taganrog (TagAZ); Taiwan: Hukou, Hsinchu (SYM Motors); Ukraine: Cherkasy (Bogdan); Venezuela: Barcelona (MMC Automotriz)

Body and chassis
- Body style: 4-door sedan 5-door Liftback
- Related: Kia Spectra

Powertrain
- Engine: Petrol: 1.5 L Alpha II I4; 1.6 L Alpha II I4; 1.6 L Beta I4; 1.8 L Beta II I4; 2.0 L Beta II I4; Diesel: 1.5 L U CRDi turbo I4; 2.0 L D CRDi turbo I4
- Transmission: 5-speed manual 4-speed automatic

Dimensions
- Wheelbase: 2,610 mm (102.8 in)
- Length: 4,510 mm (177.6 in) (2000–2003 Sedan); 4,495 mm (177.0 in) (2000–2003 Liftback); 4,525 mm (178.1 in) (2004–2006 Sedan); 4,520 mm (178.0 in) (2004–2006 Liftback)
- Width: 1,720 mm (67.7 in) (2000–2003 Sedan); 1,725 mm (67.9 in) (2004–2006 Sedan); 1,720 mm (67.7 in) (Liftback)
- Height: 1,425 mm (56.1 in)
- Curb weight: 1,195 kg (2,635 lb)

Chronology
- Successor: Hyundai i30/Elantra Touring (station wagon/Estate)

An all-new model (codename XD) was launched in 2000. The station wagon version was dropped in favor of a five-door Liftback. In the European and Australian markets, the "Lantra" name was retired and replaced by "Elantra" for this generation. Starting in model year 2001, all American market models came with standard front and front-side airbags, air conditioning, power locks, power windows, and power steering. This simplified dealer inventories and repairs and also sought to supplant Hyundai's image of "value" cars.

=== Pre-facelift ===
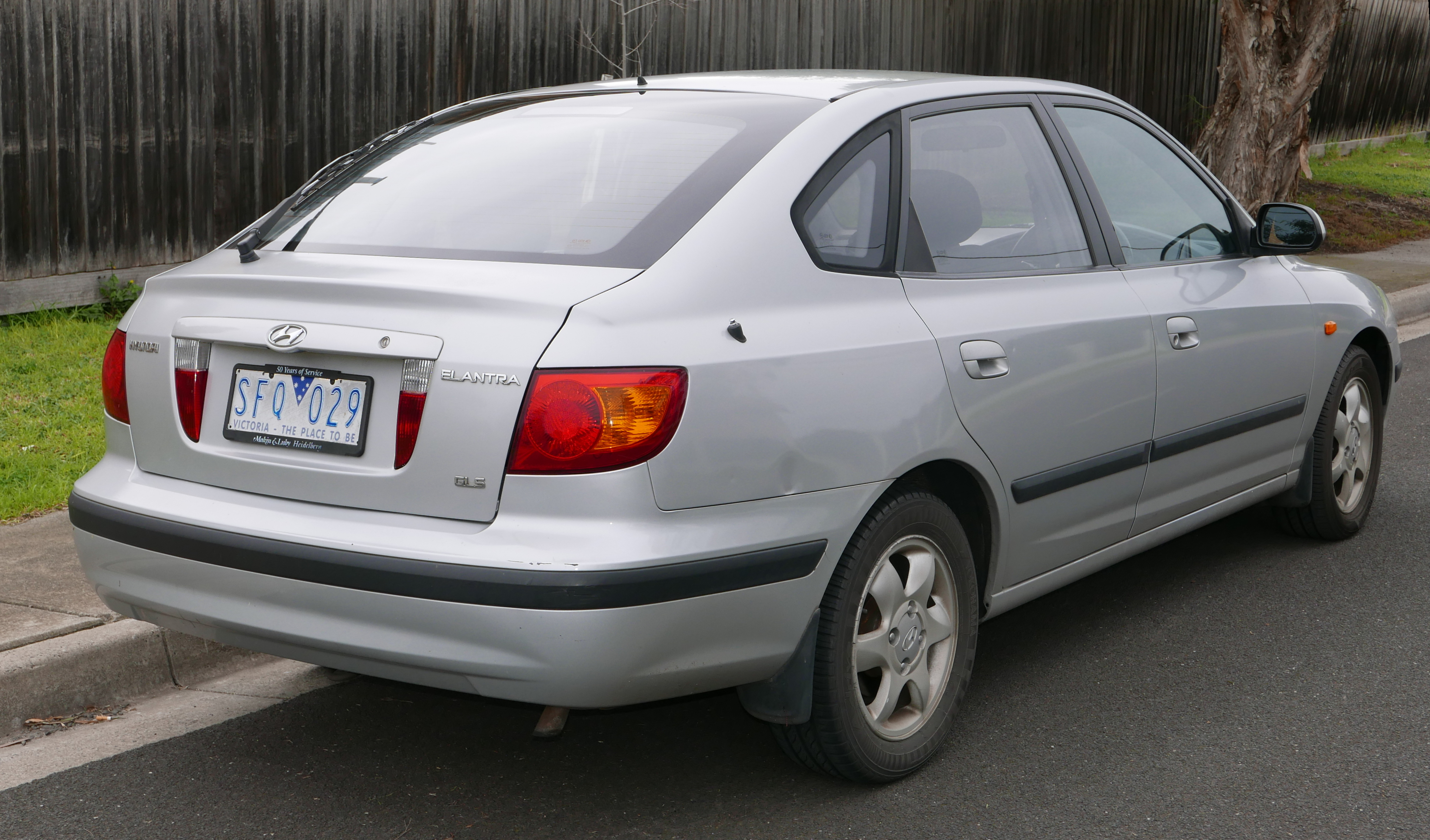
Hatchback (pre-facelift)

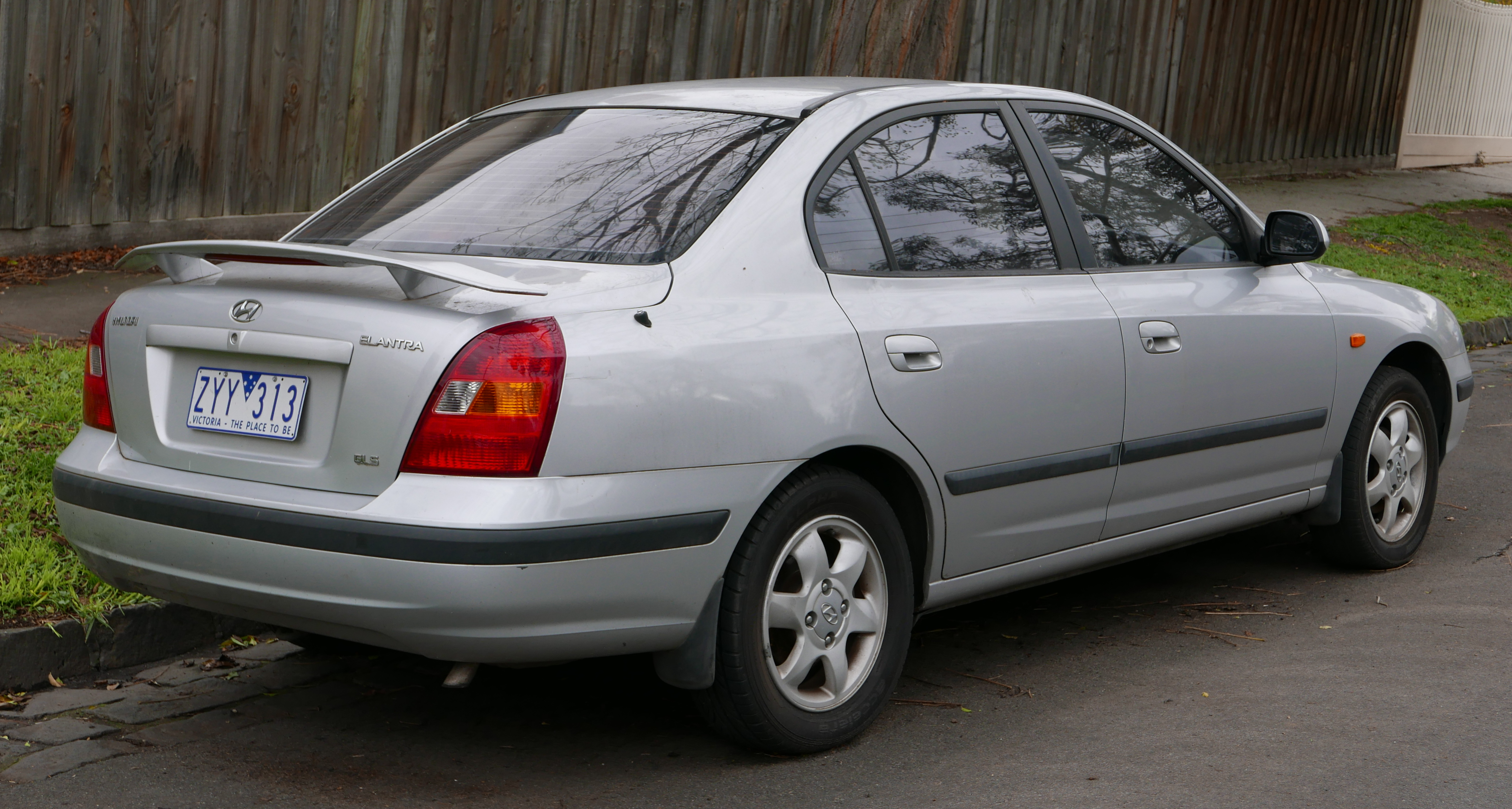
Sedan (pre-facelift)

=== Facelift ===
In 2004, all models were refreshed (codename XD2); this introduced new headlights and tail lights, a new grille, updated front and rear bumpers with a split lower grille, a redesigned hood and trunk lid, and a redesigned dashboard that added more functionality.

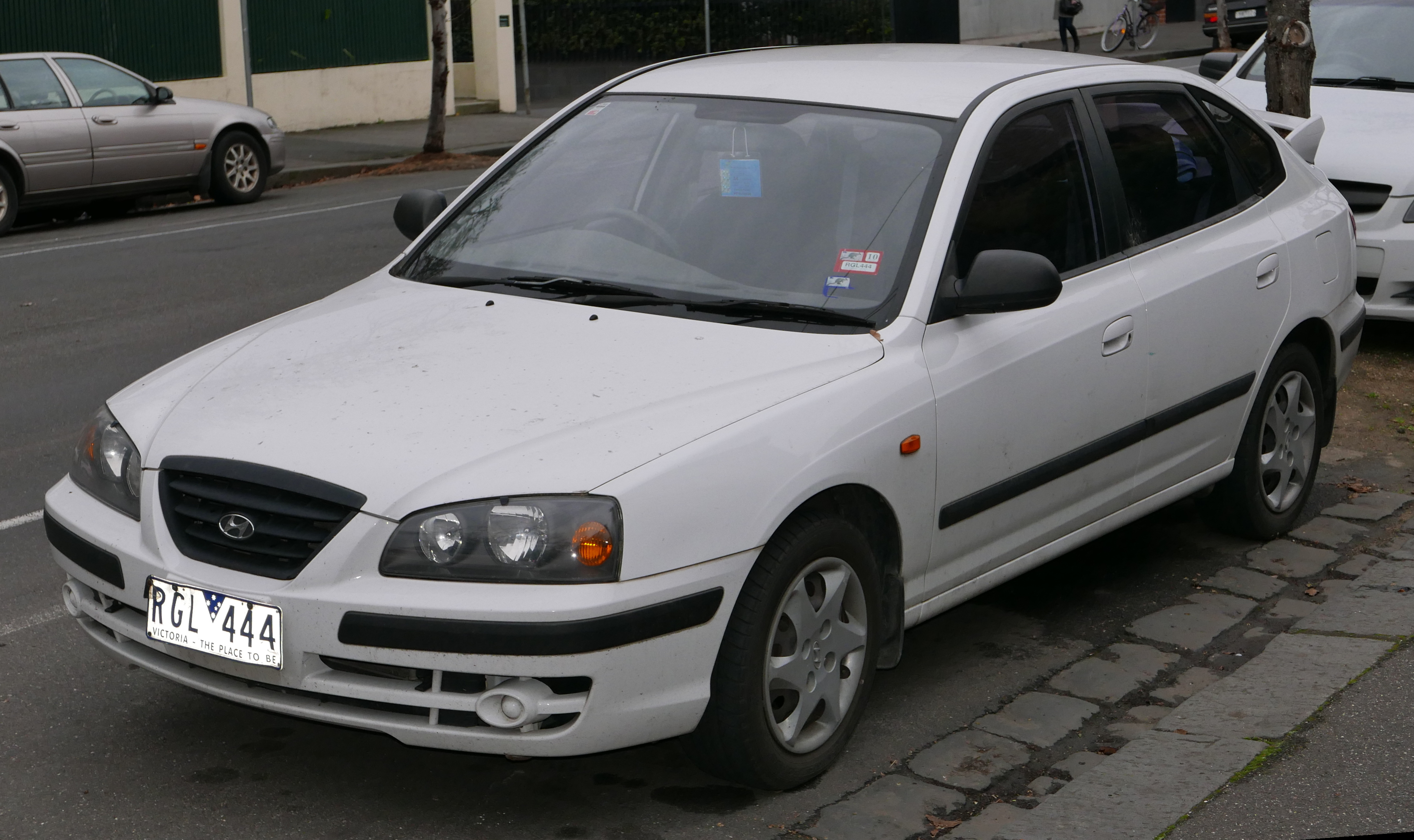
Hatchback (facelift)

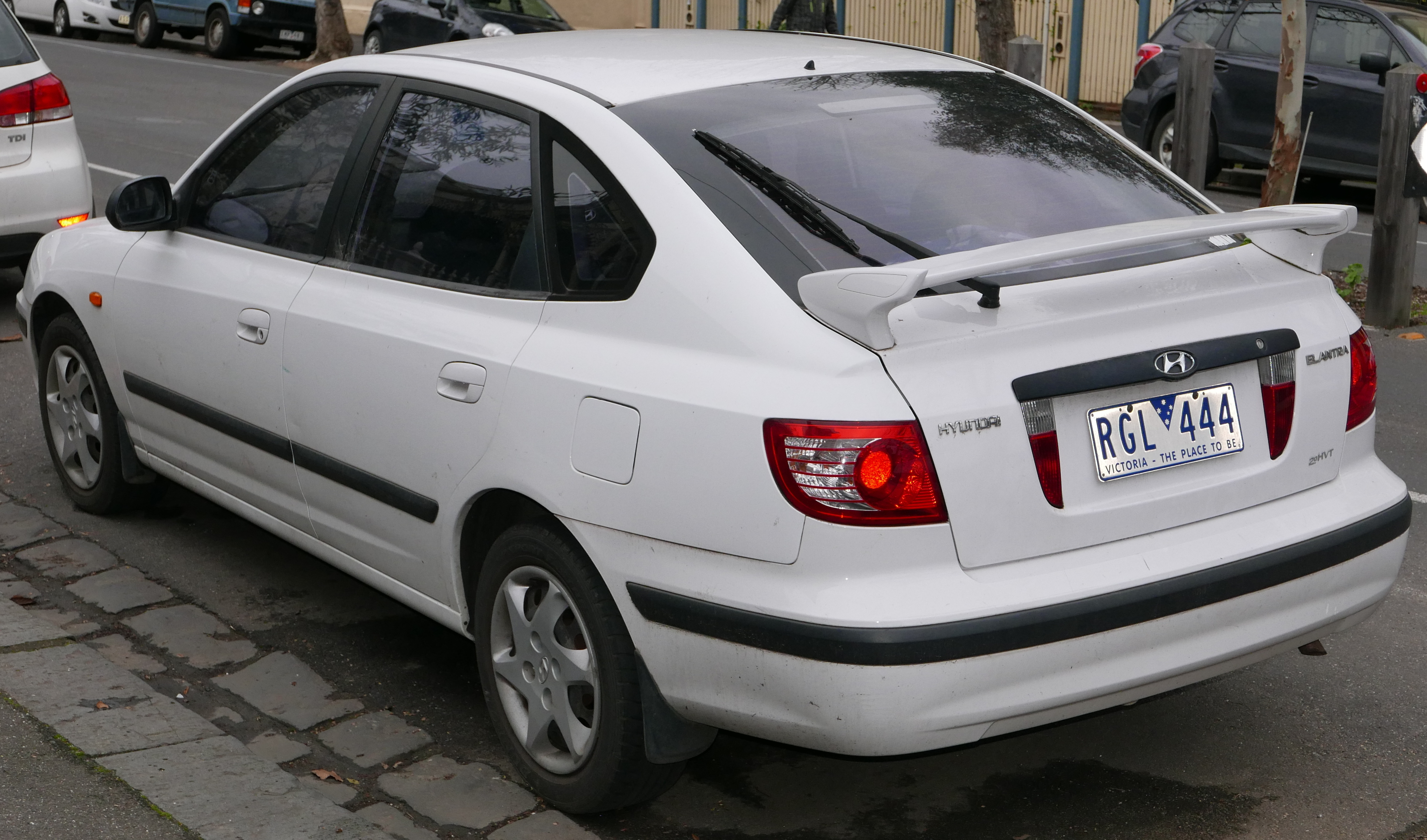
Hatchback (facelift)

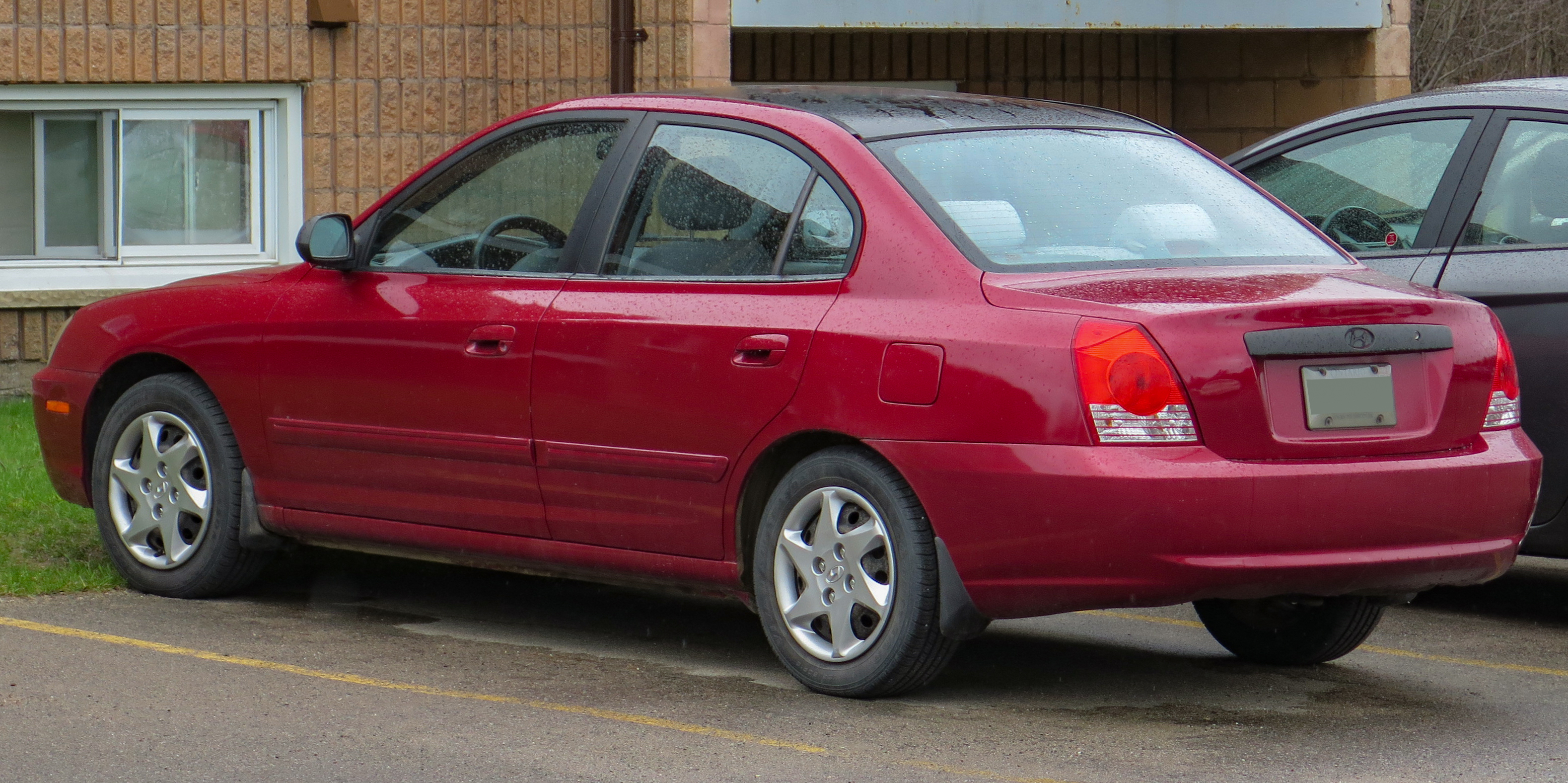
Sedan (facelift)

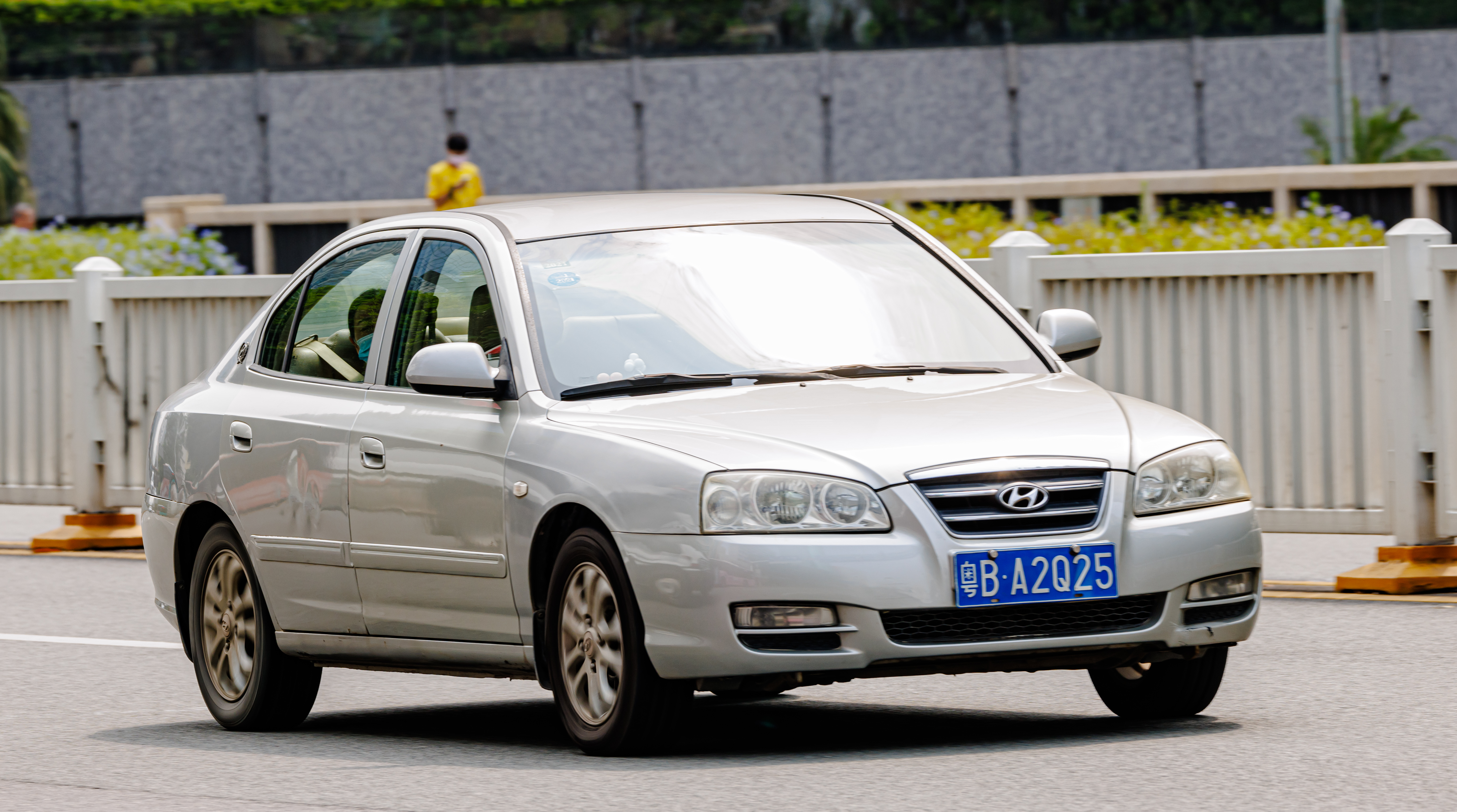
Sedan (China; 2007 facelift)

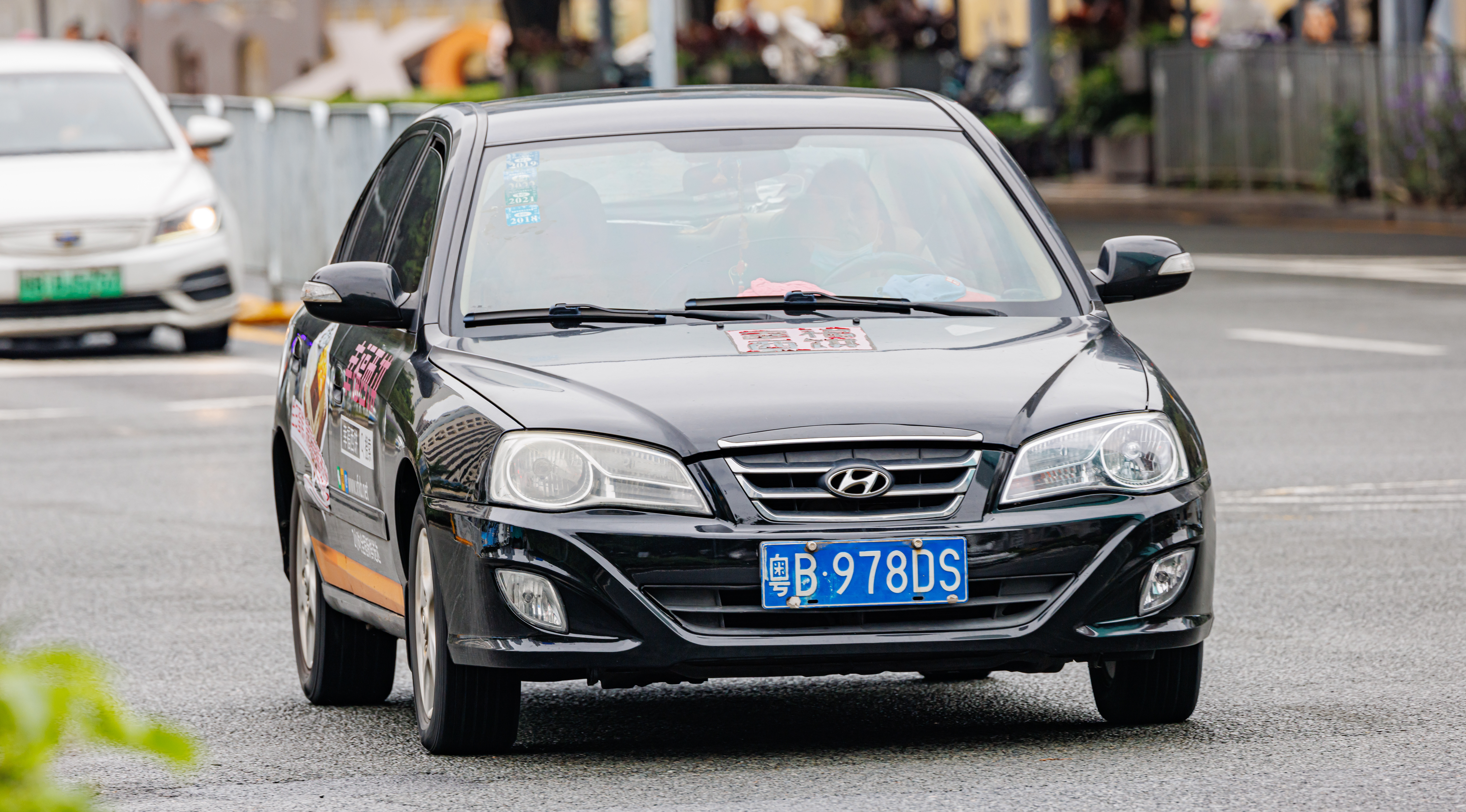
Sedan (China; 2011 facelift)

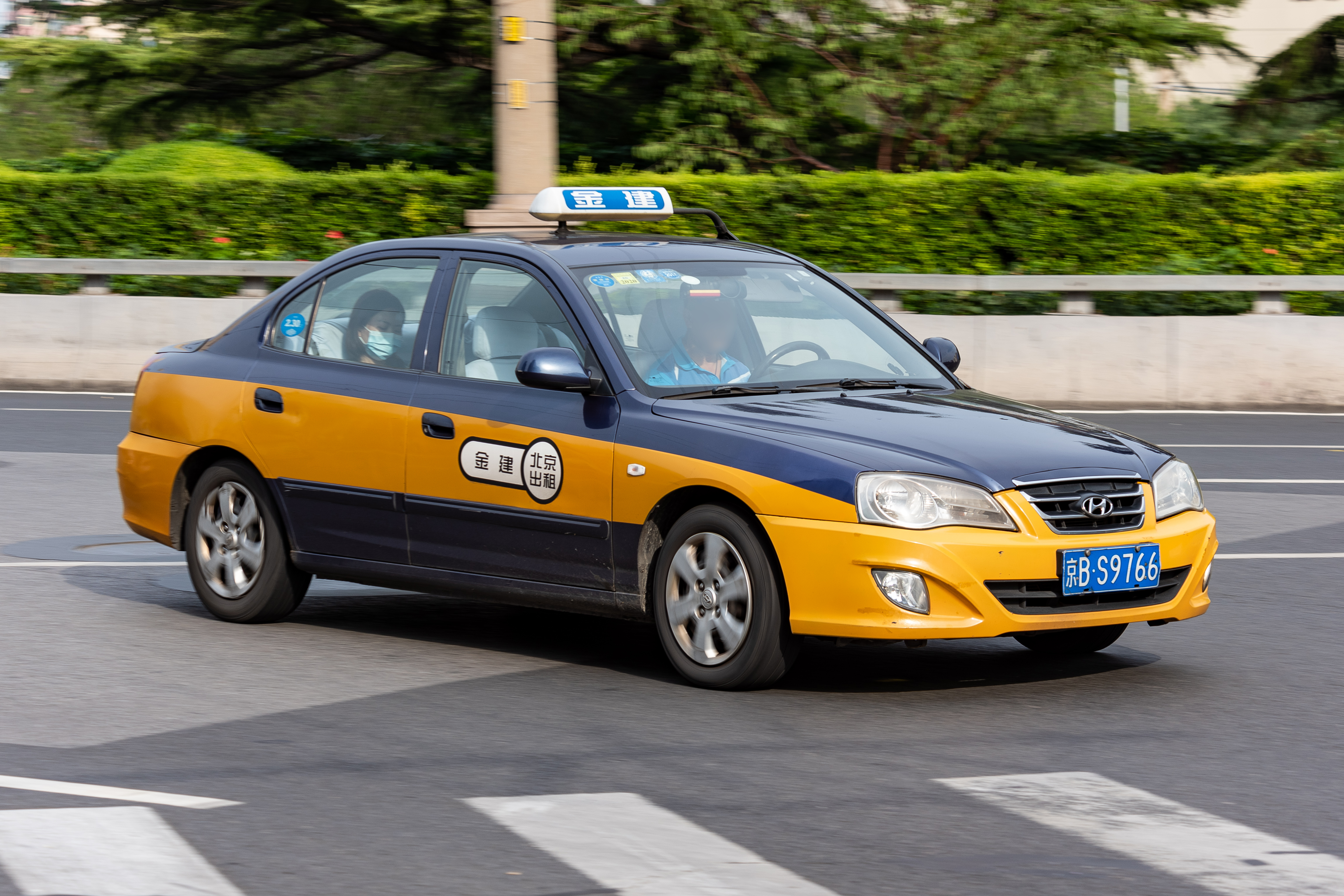
As a taxicab in Beijing

The GLS trim was the base model standard for the Elantra. The top-of-the-line model, the GT trim, came with a stiffer suspension, leather seats, fog lights, alloy wheels, lip spoiler, and blue-lit instrument cluster. Offered as a Liftback since 2001 as a 2002 model year vehicle, the only options for the GT were a power moonroof and anti-lock brakes with traction control. The only major option was a Kenwood MP3/CD deck. The GT trim sedan was introduced in 2003 and discontinued in 2005. The GT trim was replaced for the 2006 model year with the Limited trim, which featured new paint colours, a chrome vertical grille, leather interior with leather steering wheel and leather shifter and wood trim. The Limited trim featured steel rims with a 6-spoke cover featured in the GLS model. The GT trim for the five-door was produced for the remainder of the 2006 model year.

Canadian trim levels differed from that in the US: "GT" models came standard with alloy wheels, four-wheel disc brakes and ABS. Leather upholstery and TCS were only available on the "premium" GT edition.

The XD was available with 1.6-, 1.8- and 2.0-litre petrol engines and a 2.0-litre turbo-diesel. North American models are available only with the 2.0-litre petrol engine. The 1.8-litre engine is a 1.6-litre engine modified for the New Zealand market.

While compact on the outside, it was listed by the United States Environmental Protection Agency as a mid-size car because of a spacious interior. Although the basic powertrain design had changed little since the second generation, fuel economy improved for Elantras with manual transmissions from an EPA city rating of 24 to 25 mpg_{‑US} (9.8 to 9.4 L/100 km; 29 to 30 mpg_{‑imp}), and further to 27 mpg_{‑US} (8.7 L/100 km; 32 mpg_{‑imp}) in 2006. Cars with automatic transmissions returned 23 mpg_{‑US} (10 L/100 km; 28 mpg_{‑imp}), a reduction of 3 mpg_{‑US} (3.6 mpg_{‑imp}).Horsepower improved from 135 to 138 hp (101 to 103 kW), and torque from 132 to 136, mainly due to the addition of continuously variable valve timing (CVVT) in 2004. Originally, the horsepower rating was misrepresented as 140 hp (100 kW). In 2006, the Elantra was offered with a SULEV emission rated engine in some US states.

In China, the Elantra XD was produced by Beijing Hyundai from 23 December 2003 to 2011. It is available in 5 door Liftback for 2007 and sedan form from 2003 to 2010. Pre-facelifted models of the Elantra XD were produced for the 2004 model year with the front end in the same style as the 2004 facelifted model sold in Australia and the U.S but with the same rear end and taillights as the prefacelifted model.

It was then followed with a minor facelift in 2007 consisting of new headlights, radiator, rear foglights on the rear bumper, and new wheels. Production ran up to 2010. It was facelifted again for the 2011 model year featuring new headlights and the rear lights integrated from the 2004 facelift sold in international markets, along with new bumpers, a single rear bumper fog light, radiator and power-folding mirrors with integrated turn signals.

The 1.6-litre Alpha II engine is available on taxi and passenger cars paired with a 5-speed manual gearbox. The 1.8-litre Beta II engine was available until 2007.

This car was used as a taxicab in Beijing, where it replaced the popular red Tianjin Xiali taxi in 2006 in an effort to cut down pollution, in turn based on the Daihatsu Charade G100 and G102 series. The Elantra taxi was used from 2005 until 2020, after which it was replaced by the Beijing EU300 and its succeeding model, the EU5, from 2021 onwards in Beijing's taxi fleet.

=== Engines ===
2000–2003
Model	Engine	Displ.	Power	Torque	0–100 km/h (0–62 mph)	Top speed
1.6L DOHC	I4 16V	1599 cc	79 kW (107 PS; 106 hp) @ 5,800 rpm	143 N⋅m (105 lb⋅ft) @ 3,000 rpm	11.0 sec.	182 km/h (113 mph)
1.8L DOHC	I4 16V	1795 cc	94 kW (128 PS; 126 hp) @ 6,000 rpm	166 N⋅m (122 lb⋅ft) @ 5,000 rpm	9.7 sec.	199 km/h (124 mph)
2.0L DOHC	I4 16V	1975 cc	100 kW (136 PS; 134 hp) @ 6,000 rpm	181 N⋅m (133 lb⋅ft) @ 4,500 rpm	9.1 sec.	206 km/h (128 mph)
2.0L CRDi	I4 16V	1991 cc	83 kW (113 PS; 111 hp) @ 4,000 rpm	235 N⋅m (173 lb⋅ft) @ 2,000 rpm	11.7 sec.	190 km/h (118 mph)
2004–2006
Model	Engine	Displ.	Power	Torque	0–100 km/h (0–62 mph)	Top speed
1.6L DOHC	I4 16V	1599 cc	77 kW (105 PS; 103 hp) @ 6,000 rpm	143 N⋅m (105 lb⋅ft) @ 4,500 rpm	11.0 sec.	182 km/h (113 mph)
1.8L DOHC	I4 16V	1795 cc	97 kW (132 PS; 130 hp) @ 6,000 rpm	162 N⋅m (119 lb⋅ft) @ 4,500 rpm	10.2 sec.	195 km/h (121 mph)
2.0L DOHC	I4 16V	1975 cc	103 kW (140 PS; 138 hp) @ 6,000 rpm	185 N⋅m (136 lb⋅ft) @ 4,500 rpm	10.4 sec. (9.1 sec. manual)	208 km/h (129 mph)
2.0L CRDi	I4 16V	1991 cc	83 kW (113 PS; 111 hp) @ 4,000 rpm	235 N⋅m (173 lb⋅ft) @ 2,000 rpm	11.6 sec.	190 km/h (118 mph)

=== Safety ===
ANCAP test results* Hyundai Elantra 4 door sedan (2001)
Test	Score
Overall	3 /5 stars
Frontal offset	6.09/16
Side impact	13.96/16
Pole	Not Assessed
Seat belt reminders	0/3
Whiplash protection	Not Assessed
Pedestrian protection	Marginal
Electronic stability control	Not Assessed

== Fourth generation (HD; 2006) ==
Fourth generation
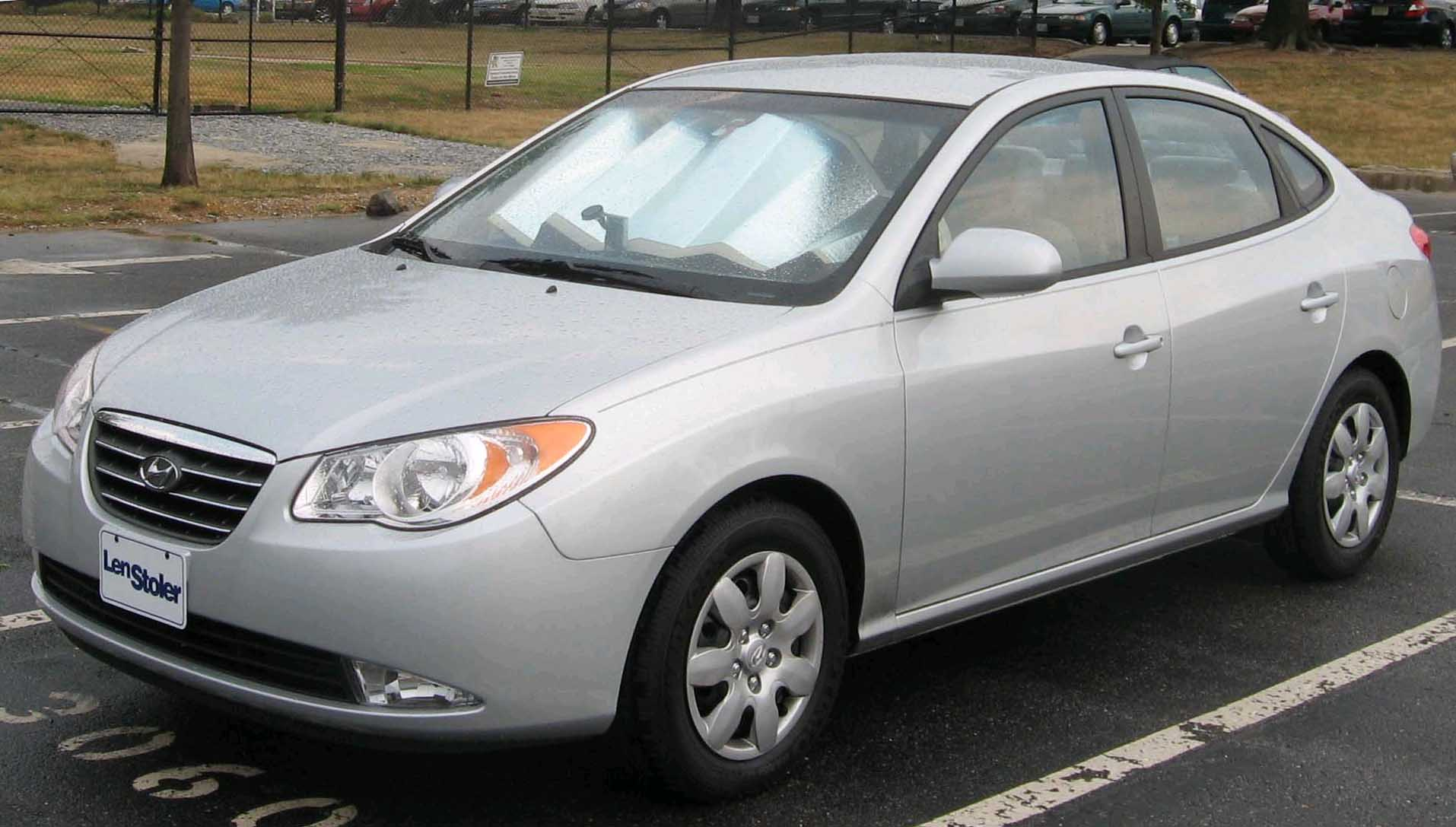

Overview
- Model code: HD
- Also called: Hyundai Avante (South Korea, Singapore)
- Production: 2006–2010 (South Korea); 2008–2020 (China); 2016–2023 (Egypt)
- Model years: 2007–2010
- Assembly: South Korea: Ulsan; China: Beijing (Beijing Hyundai); Malaysia: Kulim, Kedah (Inokom); Algeria: Tiaret; Egypt: Cairo; Taiwan: Hukou, Hsinchu (SYM)
- Designer: Eric Stoddard

Body and chassis
- Body style: 4-door sedan
- Platform: Hyundai-Kia J5 platform
- Related: Hyundai Celesta; Hyundai i30 (FD); Kia Cee'd (ED)

Powertrain
- Engine: Petrol: 1.6 L Alpha II I4 (China); 1.6 L Gamma MPi I4; 1.8 L Beta II I4 (China); 2.0 L Beta II I4; Petrol hybrid LPG: 1.6 L Gamma LPi I4; Diesel: 1.6 L U CRDi-VGT I4
- Transmission: 5-speed manual 4-speed automatic CVT

Dimensions
- Wheelbase: 2,650 mm (104.3 in)
- Length: 4,505 mm (177.4 in); 4,542 mm (178.8 in) (Elantra Yuedong)
- Width: 1,775 mm (69.9 in)
- Height: 1,480 mm (58.3 in); 1,490 mm (58.7 in) (Elantra Yuedong)

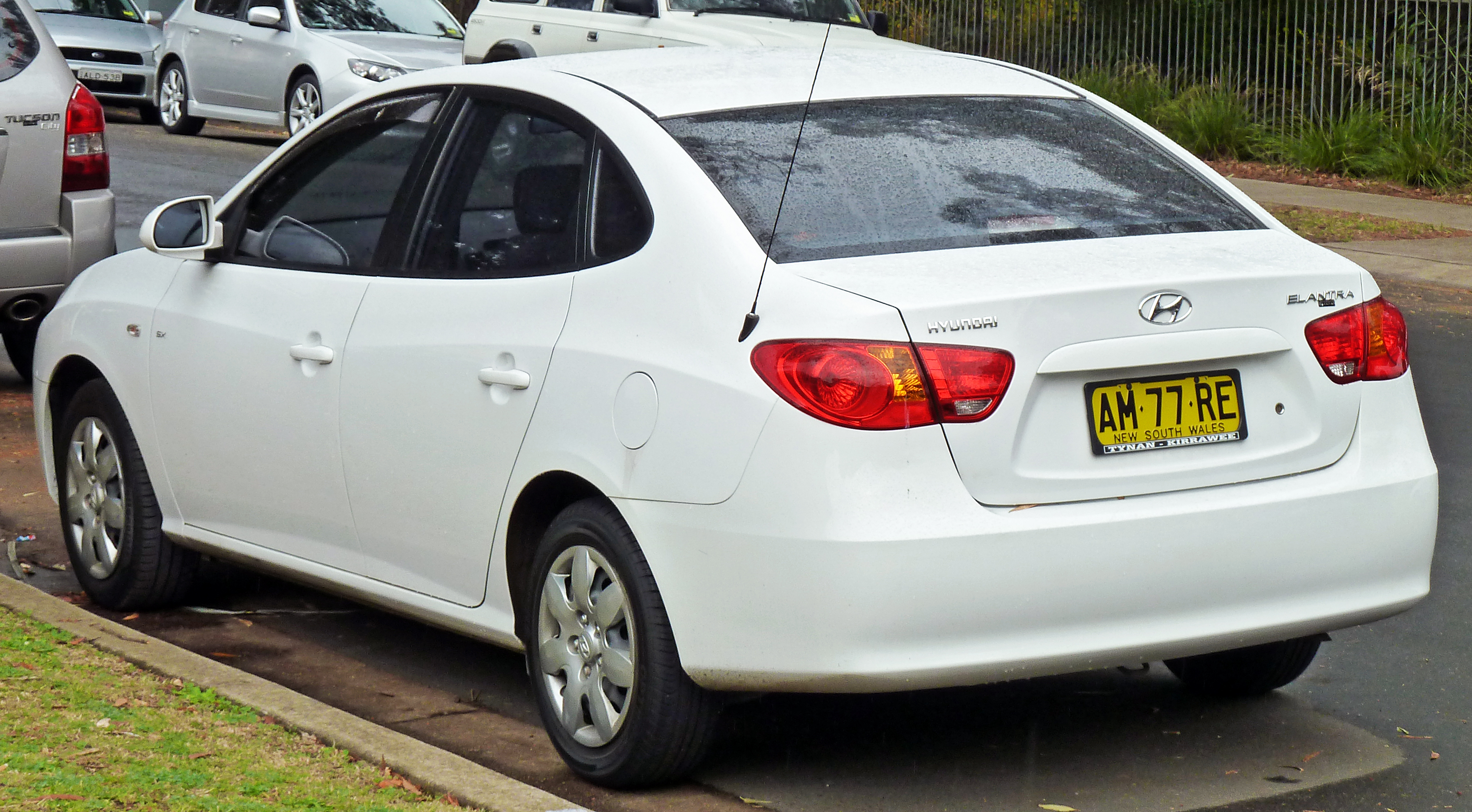
Hyundai Elantra SX sedan (Australia)

A redesigned sedan (designated HD) debuted at the 2006 New York International Auto Show for the 2007 model year. As before, the HD was sold under the Hyundai Avante name in its South Korean home market. It had a more rounded, jelly bean-like design used in the US in the 1990s.

The engine lineup included 1.6- Gamma and 2.0 L Beta II petrol inline-four engines, and a 1.6 L turbodiesel inline-four. All engines featured improved fuel economy. A five-speed manual transmission was standard with an optional four-speed automatic.

According to the Insurance Institute for Highway Safety (IIHS) the Elantra received a Good overall score in the frontal crash test and a Marginal overall score in the side impact test, but all Hyundai Elantras manufactured after November 2009 earned a Good overall score in the side impact test. Standard side airbags included front and rear head curtain airbags and front seat-mounted torso airbags.

=== China ===
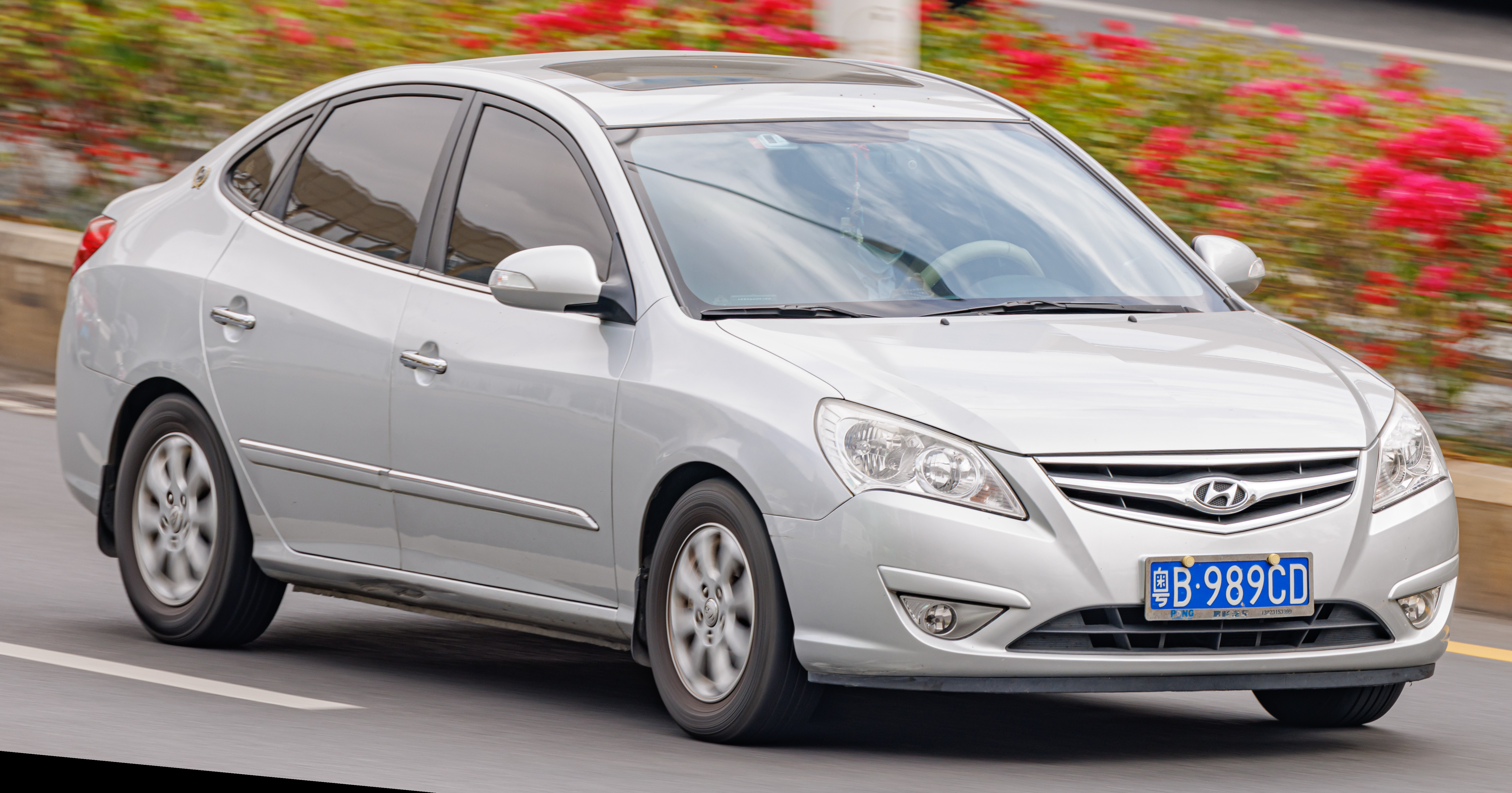
Hyundai Elantra Yuedong (China; pre-facelift)

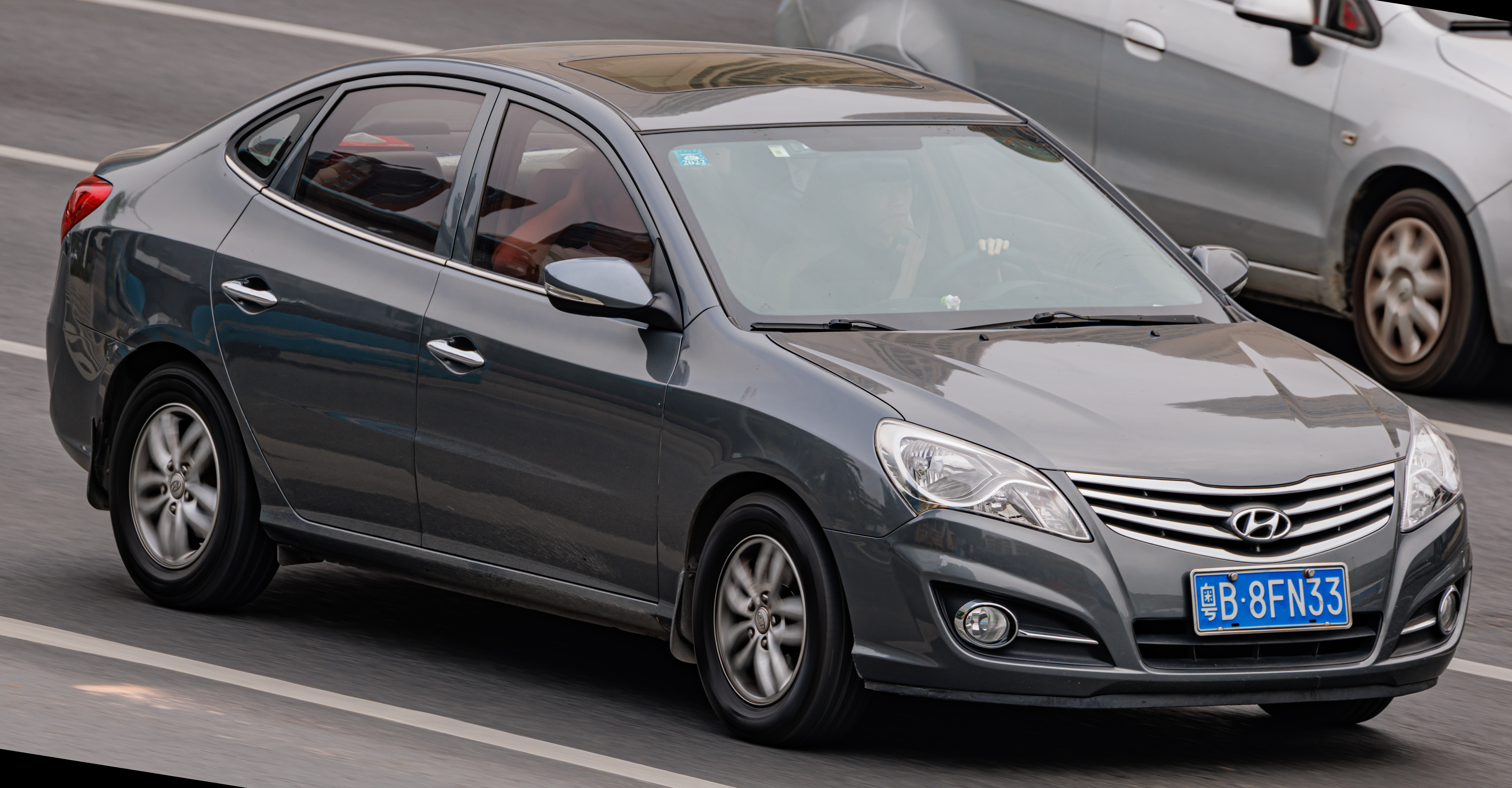
Hyundai Elantra Yuedong (China; facelift)

Beijing Hyundai launched a redesigned Elantra called the "Elantra Yue Dong" for the Chinese market with an updated exterior and a separate facelifted 2011 Elantra model. The model was later updated in 2017 and is currently known as the Hyundai Celesta.

=== North America ===
Only the 2.0 L engine was offered in North America. Unlike the 2006 model year XD series, the 2007 model year base Hyundai Elantra GLS trim did not include air conditioning as standard equipment, but added side curtain airbags (previously front and side only), active head restraints and all-round disc brakes with four-channel ABS. The Elantra offered the most interior room in its class, leading the United States Environmental Protection Agency (EPA) to classify it as a mid-size car.

Hyundai offered the Hyundai i30 wagon in the U.S. and Canada marketed as the "Elantra Touring". Elsewhere, the same vehicle was marketed as the Hyundai i30cw.

- 2008 model year: the "Limited" trim level was dropped, leaving "GLS" and "SE" trim choices. The SE trim included features not available on the "GLS" such as a telescopic steering wheel and electronic stability control (ESC), with sunroof and leather upholstery as options. According to Consumer Reports testing, the "SE" trim has significantly better handling and braking than the base "GLS" trim.
- 2009 model year: iPod and USB interfaces became standard on the "SE" models. On the instrument panel, the gear shift indicator moved to the trip computer display, and the coolant temperature gauge was removed. "GLS" models received new wheel cover designs, and "SE" models had a rear garnish on the rear registration plate border. Exterior colour choices now included Natural Khaki. The 2009 model year was J.D. Power's highest quality compact car. The study measured 228 attributes, including overall driving experience, engine and transmission, and a broad range of defect and design problems reported by vehicle owners. The 2008, 2009 and 2010 Elantra SE was consistently chosen as a Top Pick for compact sedans by Consumer Reports magazine.
- 2010 model year: a new "Blue" trim was added, a basic model modified for increased fuel economy. The grille design was slightly modified and "Blue" and "GLS" models received chrome rear garnish. The interior received chrome door handles, new metallic interior finish, cup holders, and a chrome-trimmed gear selector for "SE" models. On "GLS" and "SE" models automatic transmission became standard, while the lesser "Blue" models only offered manual. The "GLS" offered sunroof or an LG navigation system; "SE" included a choice of two packages: a sunroof with heated seats or a sunroof with heated seats, LG navigation and Bluetooth. iPod and USB connectivity became standard on the "GLS" and available on the "Blue". Exterior colour choices were slightly changed, with Nordic White and Black Noir Pearl replacing the Captiva White and Black Pearl, respectively; Purple Rain was deleted.

Canadian trim levels were different from the US models. The base model "L" offered a base package with a four-speaker CD/MP3/Auxiliary stereo and front airbags. This trim included power windows in the front with manual windows in the rear. The "GL" added heated mirrors, air conditioning, power windows, heated seats, a six-speaker stereo, wheel-mounted cruise control, and keyless entry with alarm. The "GLS" trim added wheel-mounted audio controls, ABS, all-round disc brakes, and front seat-mounted side-impact and roof-mounted side curtain airbags. The "GLS" with the Sport Package included a rear spoiler, power sunroof, 16-inch alloy wheels, fog lamps, trip computer and a leather-wrapped steering wheel and leather shifter. The final trim level, the "Limited", added leather seats, a telescopic steering wheel, and automatic climate control air conditioning.

=== LPI Hybrid ===
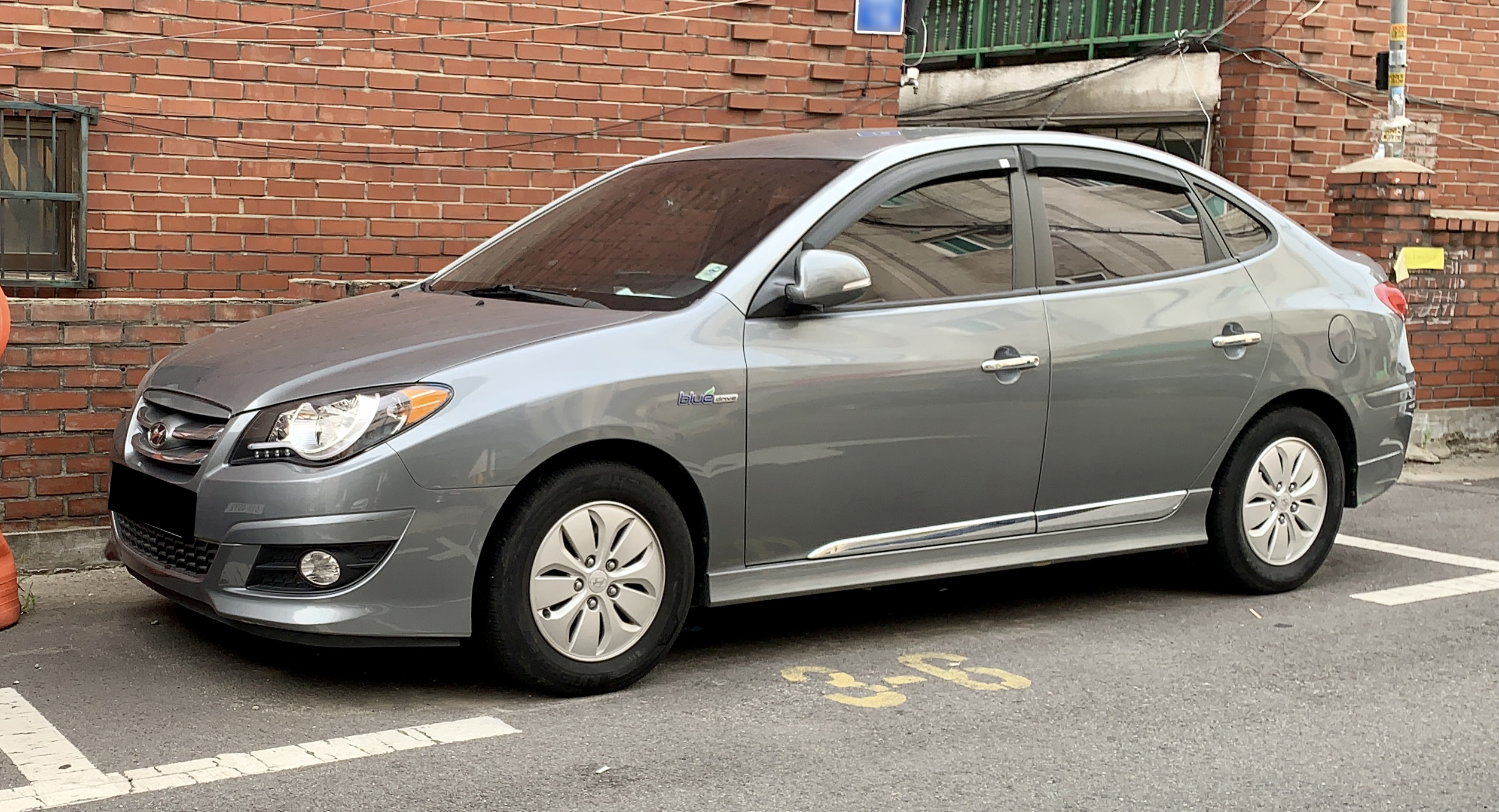

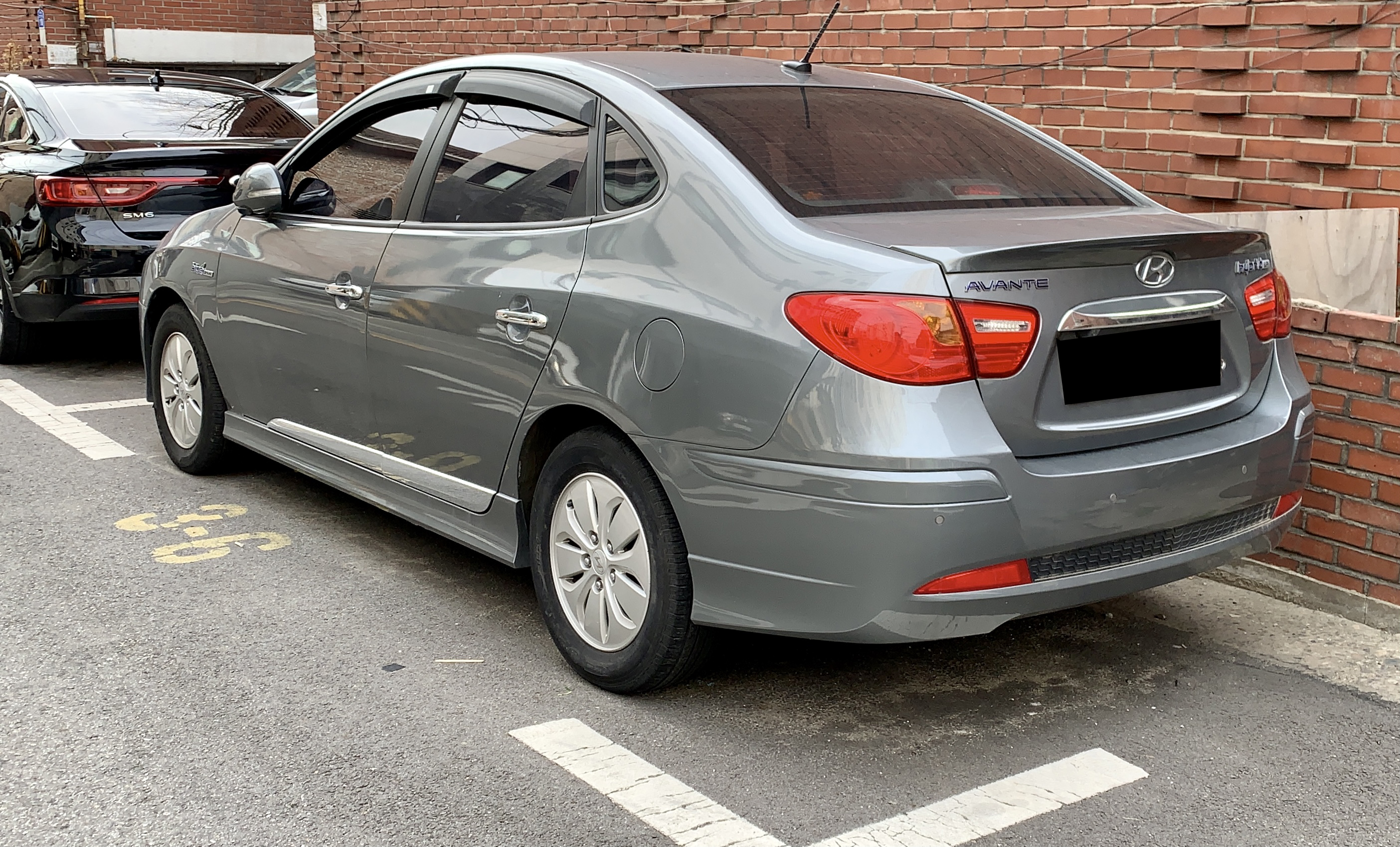
Hyundai Avante LPI Hybrid (South Korea)

Hyundai presented the LPI Hybrid at the 2009 Seoul Motor Show, and sales began as the Avante "LPI Hybrid" in the South Korean market in July 2009. The LPI Hybrid (liquefied petroleum injected) is a mild hybrid and is the world's first hybrid electric vehicle to be powered by an internal combustion engine built to run on liquefied petroleum gas (LPG) as a fuel. Hyundai developed the technology and all key components in the LPI Hybrid, together with its local partners including the electric motor, battery and low DC/DC converter. The lithium-ion polymer batteries, which the LPI Hybrid was the first hybrid to adopt, differed from lithium-ion batteries, using a claimedly more stable and fire-resistant dry polymer electrolyte from Korean company LG Chem instead of a liquid or gel.

The LPI Hybrid came equipped with the 1.6 L Gamma engine, a 15 kilowatts (20 hp) electric motor, and a continuously variable transmission (CVT). The LPI Hybrid delivered 41.9 miles per US gallon (5.61 L/100 km; 50.3 mpg_{‑imp}). Compared to the conventional 1.6 L model, and considering South Korean petrol prices, the LPI Hybrid can travel 39 kilometres (24 mi) for the price of one litre of petrol, while the conventional model would be able to travel only 15 kilometres (9.3 mi). The engine emitted 99 g/km of CO_{2}, which allows the car to qualify as a Super Ultra Low Emission Vehicle (SULEV). The LPI Hybrid produced 90 percent fewer emissions than an equivalent standard petrol powered model, and LPG is a low carbon emitting hydrocarbon fuel that burns more cleanly than either petrol or diesel, and also is free of the particulates associated with diesel. The LPI Hybrid shares its powertrain with the Kia Forte LPI Hybrid.

The Elantra hybrid comes with an "Eco Guide" tree icon meant to coach the driver into developing more eco driving habits. The CVT has an optional "E (Eco-Drive)" gear to maximize fuel efficiency. The LPG Hybrid was dropped in Australia due to lack of demand, increase in emphasis on brand image and change in focus to cleaner diesel engines.

=== Safety ===
ANCAP test results* Hyundai Elantra variants with dual frontal airbags (2006)
Test	Score
Overall	3 /5 stars
Frontal offset	7.81/16
Side impact	10.99/16
Pole	0/2
Seat belt reminders	0/3
Whiplash protection	Not Assessed
Pedestrian protection	Poor
Electronic stability control	Optional

ANCAP test results* Hyundai Elantra variants with side curtain airbags (2007)
Test	Score
Overall	3 /5 stars
Frontal offset	7.81/16
Side impact	12.95/16
Pole	Not Assessed
Seat belt reminders	0/3
Whiplash protection	Not Assessed
Pedestrian protection	Poor
Electronic stability control	Optional

ANCAP test results* Hyundai Elantra variants with dual frontal airbags (2007)
Test	Score
Overall	3 /5 stars
Frontal offset	7.81/16
Side impact	11.99/16
Pole	Not Assessed
Seat belt reminders	0/3
Whiplash protection	Not Assessed
Pedestrian protection	Poor
Electronic stability control	Optional

== Fifth generation (MD/UD/JK; 2010) ==
Fifth generation
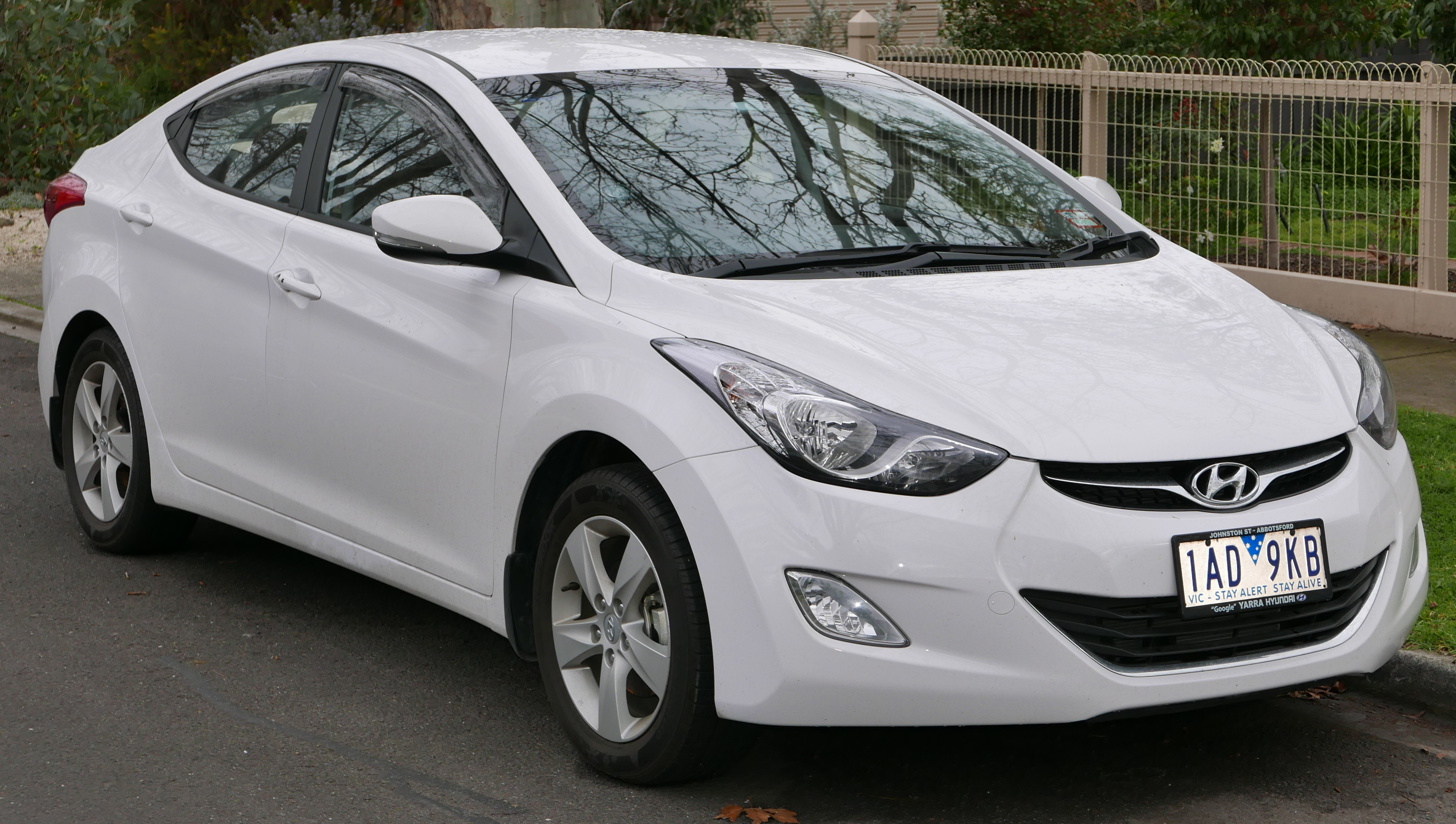

Overview
- Model code: MD/UD; JK (coupe)
- Also called: Hyundai Avante (South Korea); Hyundai i35 Elantra (Israel and Colombia)
- Production: 2010–2015; 2012–2018 (China); 2011–2016 (Malaysia)
- Model years: 2011–2016
- Assembly: South Korea: Ulsan; United States: Montgomery, Alabama (HMMA); Malaysia: Kulim, Kedah (Inokom); India: Chennai (HMIL); Taiwan: Hukou, Hsinchu (SYM); China: Beijing (Beijing Hyundai); Russia: Kaliningrad (Avtotor); Algeria: Tiaret (TMC)
- Designer: Kim In-Seop (2008)

Body and chassis
- Body style: 4-door sedan 2-door coupé (2012–2014)
- Platform: Hyundai-Kia J5 platform
- Related: Hyundai i30 (GD); Kia Cee'd (CD); Kia Forte (YD)

Powertrain
- Engine: Petrol: 1.6 L Gamma MPi CVVT I4; 1.6 L Gamma GDi I4; 1.8 L Nu MPi CVVT I4; 2.0 L Nu MPi CVVT I4; 2.0 L Nu GDi I4; Diesel: 1.6 L U II CRDi-VGT I4
- Transmission: 6-speed manual 6-speed automatic

Dimensions
- Wheelbase: 2,700 mm (106.3 in)
- Length: 4,530–4,540 mm (178.3–178.7 in)
- Width: 1,775 mm (69.9 in)
- Height: 1,435–1,445 mm (56.5–56.9 in)
- Curb weight: 1,160–1,335 kg (2,557–2,943 lb)

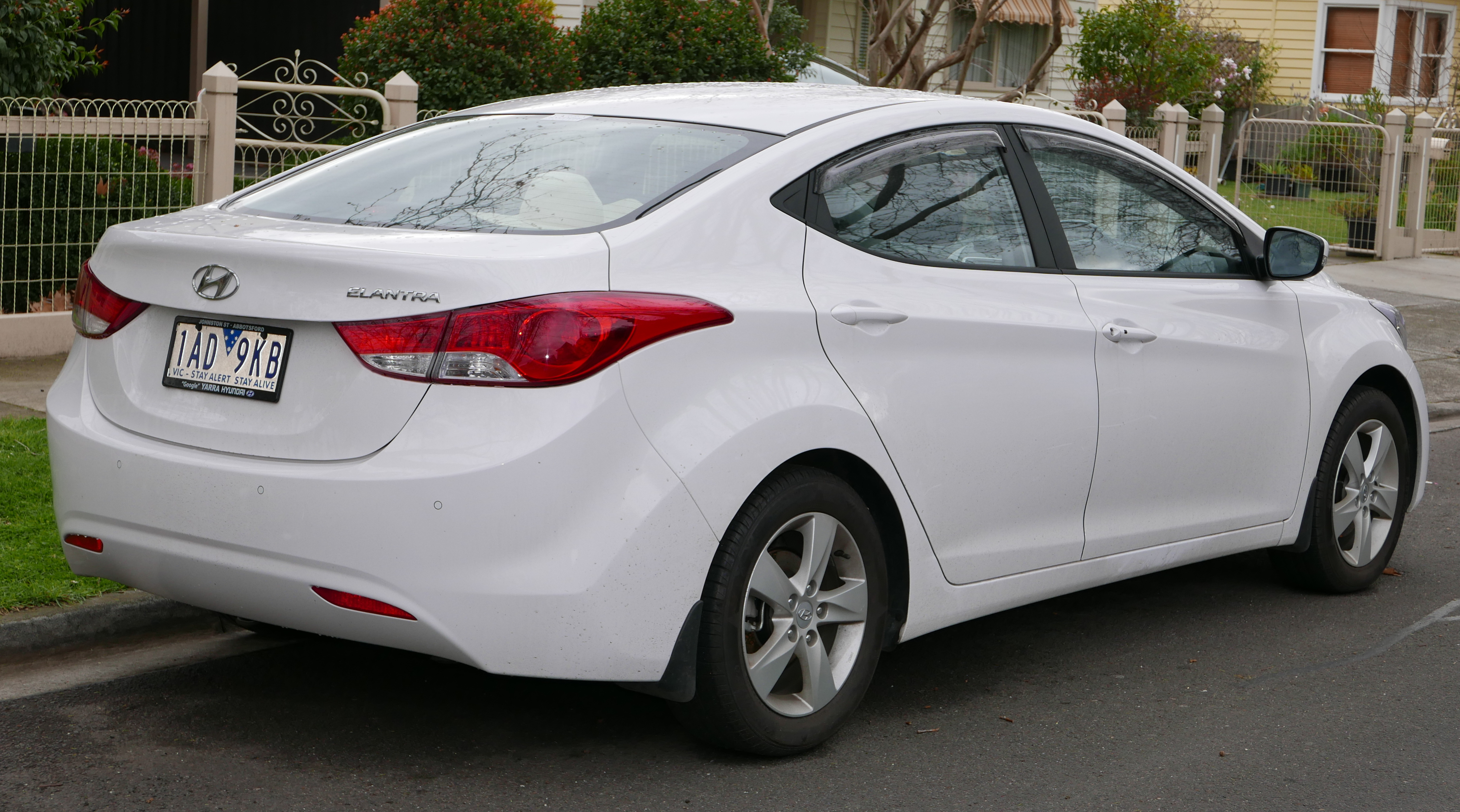
Hyundai Elantra Elite (Australia; pre-facelift)

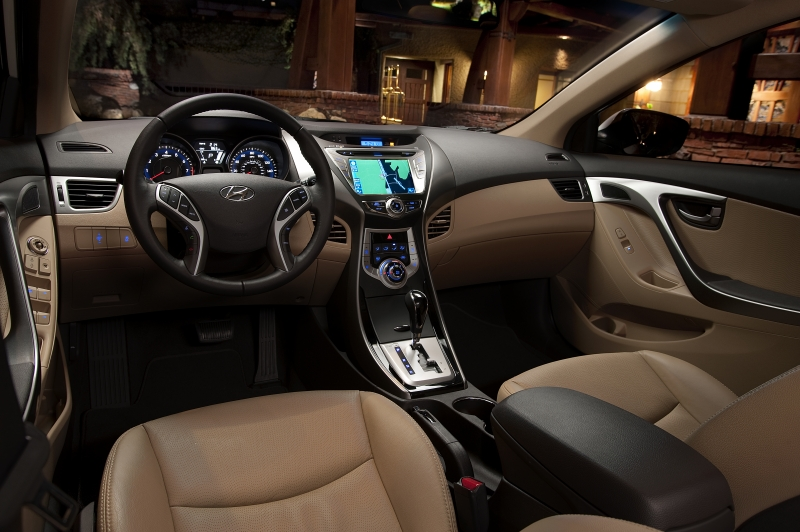
Interior

The fifth-generation Avante debuted at the 2010 Busan International Motor Show in April 2010. It was codenamed "MD" for the sedan, "UD" for sedans manufactured in the US, and "JK" for the coupe. For the U.S. and Canadian market, it featured a new 1.8-L petrol engine. In other markets, it featured a 1.6-L petrol direct-injection engine, producing 103 kW (138 hp) and 167 Nm (123 lb-ft) torque, mated to a new 6-speed automatic or manual transmission. For markets such as the Middle East, the 1.6-L engine was a MPI version that delivers 128 hp. The Israeli market received the Elantra, with a 1.6 GDI 132 hp coupled to a 6-speed automatic transmission only. The design continued Hyundai's "fluidic sculpture" styling theme first seen in the 2011 Sonata. The new model went on sale in August 2010 in South Korea, and began selling between end of 2010 and early 2011 as a 2011 model. The US version of the fifth-generation Elantra debuted at the 2010 Los Angeles Auto Show. It is powered by a new 1.8-L Nu engine producing 148 hp (145 hp-PZEV) and 131 lb-ft (130 lb-ft-PZEV). The fuel economy was aided by a low drag coefficient of just 0.28. The Nu engine block is made of aluminum instead of the previous cast iron.

EPA's estimated gas mileage 40/29 was questioned by Consumer Watchdog, a Santa Monica CA consumer group. USA Today writer Jefferson Graham claimed to get combined city/highway mpg of 22 mpg. However, a real-world test by Popular Mechanics showed significantly better fuel economy than EPA estimated MPG. Also, The Truth About Cars editor tested real-world MPG, leading them to give Consumer Watchdog a thumbs down. EPA mileage estimates were originally 29 mpg_{‑US} (8.1 L/100 km; 35 mpg_{‑imp}) in the city and 40 mpg_{‑US} (5.9 L/100 km; 48 mpg_{‑imp}) on the highway but were revised to 28 mpg_{‑US} (8.4 L/100 km; 34 mpg_{‑imp}) in the city and 38 mpg_{‑US} (6.2 L/100 km; 46 mpg_{‑imp}) on the highway due to a series of testing procedural errors in November 2012. The underpinnings of the second-generation i30 and Elantra were similar in their configuration and makeup. The similarities between the second-generation i30 and Elantra continued in front end and suspension characteristics.

It was available in two trim levels, GLS and Limited. Premium features included heated front and rear seats, proximity key entry with electronic push-button start with immobilizer, and touch screen navigation. US 2011 sales reached 186,361 units, up 41 percent from 2010. The Elantra was crowned North American Car of the Year at the 2012 Detroit Auto Show, over the Ford Focus and Volkswagen Passat. The Elantra was crowned South African Car of the Year for 2012. At the 8th Manila International Auto Show, the Elantra was crowned as the Philippine Car of the Year, the first Korean car maker to win the award. Hyundai Elantra 1.8 GLS won the WesBank's Car of the Year in South Africa and North American Car of the Year at the 2012 Detroit Auto Show.

- 2012 model year: An ActiveECO system was now included with automatic transmission models, a dual-shell horn was added, steering calibration was adjusted, fog lights and passenger side sun visor extension were added to the GLS Preferred Package, and some exterior colour adjustments were made.
- 2013 model year: Manual transmission models received an increase in standard equipment, and heated front seats were added to the GLS Preferred Package. On Limited trims, a power driver seat with lumbar support was now standard and dual-zone automatic climate control was available on the Limited Technology Package. Atlantic Blue was a new exterior colour option. Halfway through the model year, audio head units were revised to include separate knobs for volume control and tuning options.

=== Facelift ===
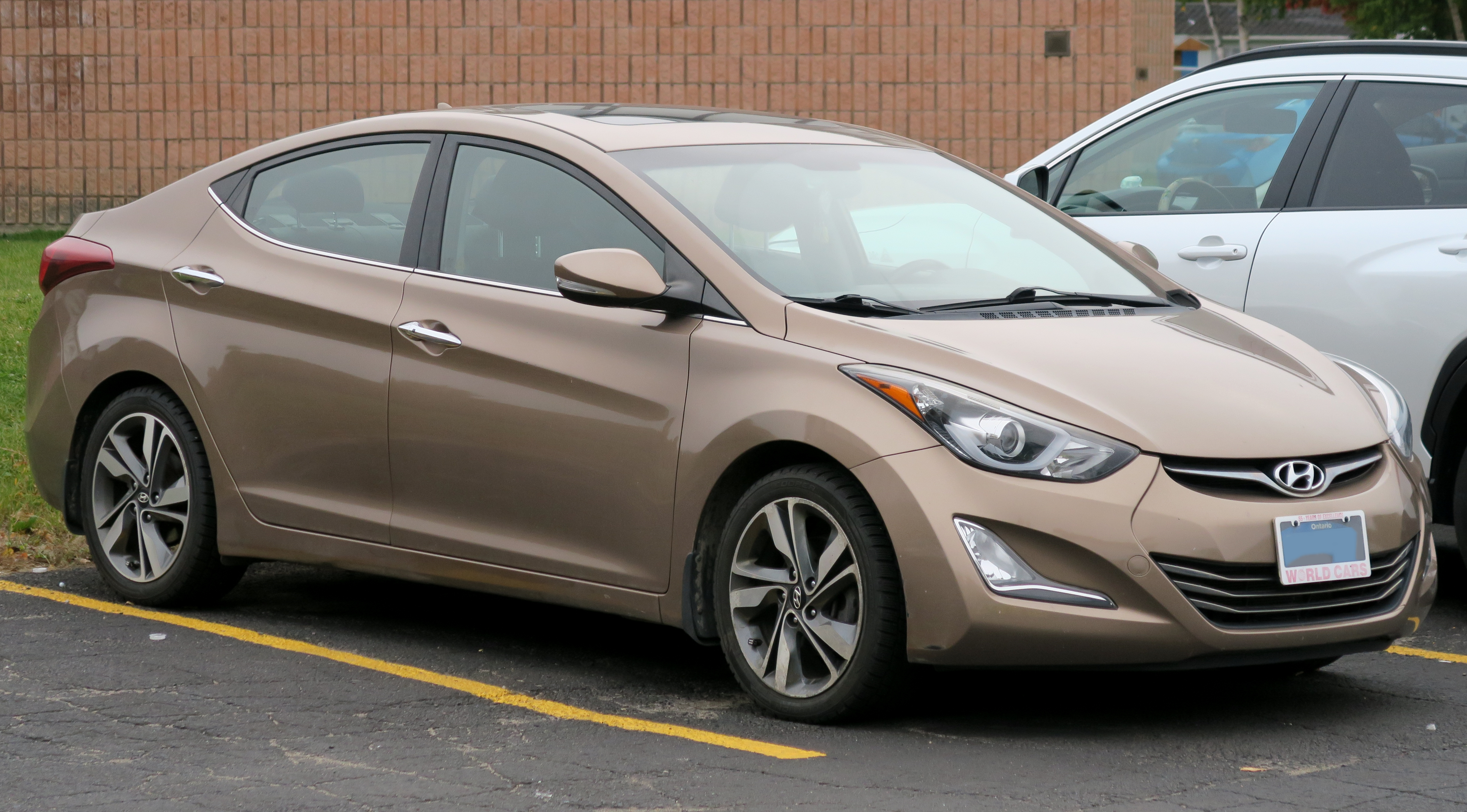

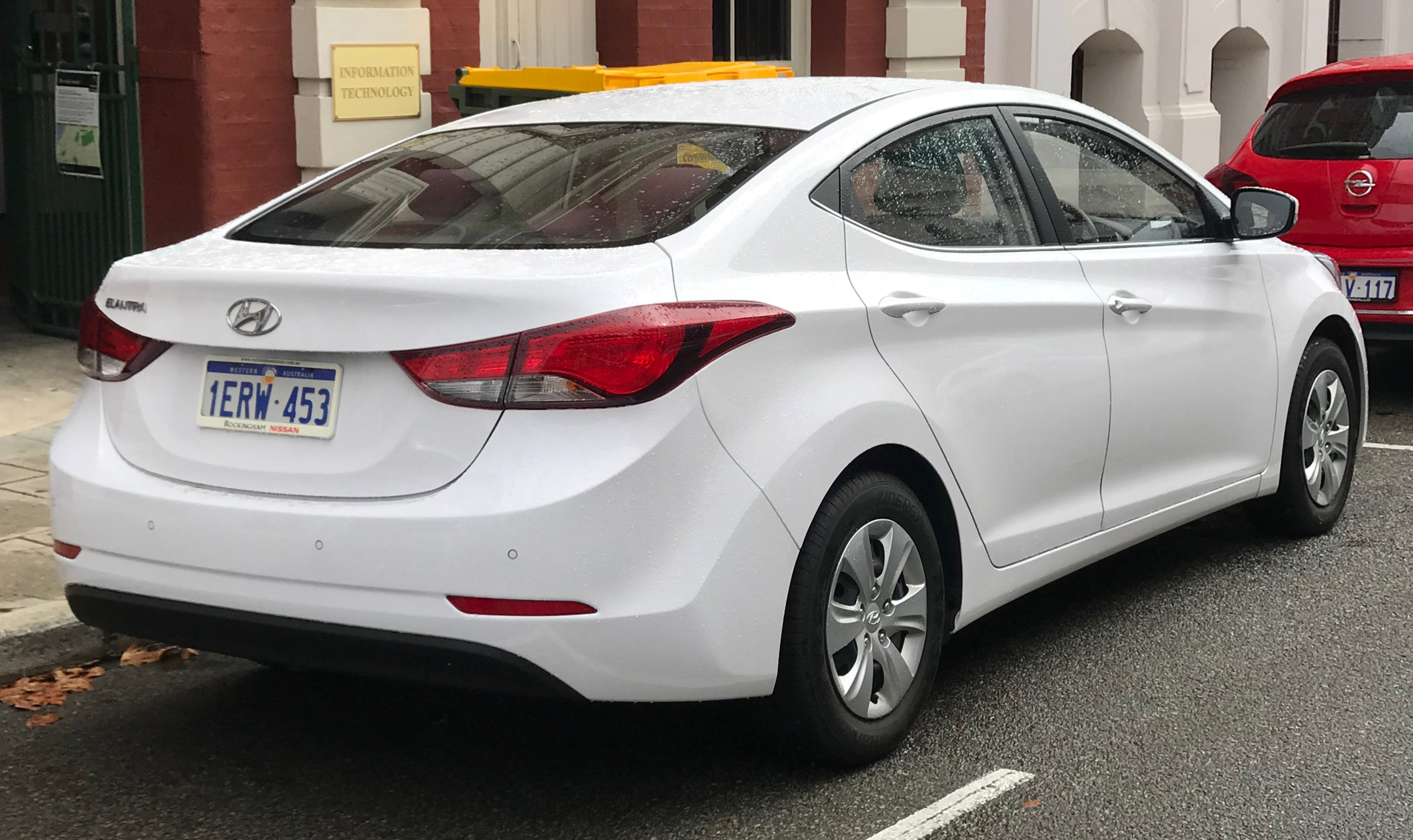
Facelift

In 2013 for the 2014 model year, the Elantra sedan received significant updates. The GLS trim was changed to SE and an all-new Elantra Sport was now available with a more powerful 2.0 L GDI engine.

Exterior enhancements include new front and rear styling with tinted tail lights and L-shaped fog light housings. Limited and Sport models included projector headlights with LED accents and LED tail lights. New wheel designs were available for all trims, including the base SE, SE with SE Preferred Package, Limited, and Sport models. A driver's blind spot mirror was added and a new Driver Selectable Steering Mode is standard on the Limited and Sport models.

Interior enhancements include raised HVAC vent locations and new HVAC control design; 4.3-inch LCD touchscreen radio with a backup camera on the SE Preferred Package, Limited and Sport models; updated navigation system; increased center armrest location; and straight pull gear selector with leather boot.

- 2015 model year: A new SE Style Package is available for SE trims and included a sunroof, leather steering wheel and shifter, projector headlights with LED accents, chrome belt molding, and aluminum door sills. A Sport Tech Package added navigation and premium audio.
- 2016 model year: A new Value Edition for the SE package replaced the SE Style Package, and included wheels from the Elantra Coupe SE, sunroof, leather steering wheel and shifter, smart key and push-button start, heated front seats, and side-mirror turn signals. Limited models now included a standard smart key with push-button start and dual-zone climate control. Sport models had reduced pricing, but no longer included leather seats or a sunroof.

=== Elantra Langdong ===
Elantra Langdong (Chinese: 朗動) is a longer version of Elantra for the Chinese market. Released in August 2012, the Langdong sedan is 4 cm (1.6 in) longer and 1 cm (0.39 in) wider than the Elantra sold in other markets. Its hexagonal front grille was replaced with a chrome wing-shaped version. The design was based on the Wind Craft concept.

The vehicle was unveiled at the 2012 Beijing Motor Show. Production models included a choice of 1.6 L MPI engine rated 127.4 PS (94 kW; 126 hp) and 15.9 kg⋅m (156 N⋅m; 115 lbf⋅ft), 1.8 L MPI engines rated 146 PS (107 kW; 144 hp) and 17.8 kg⋅m (175 N⋅m; 129 lbf⋅ft); six-speed manual and automatic transmissions.

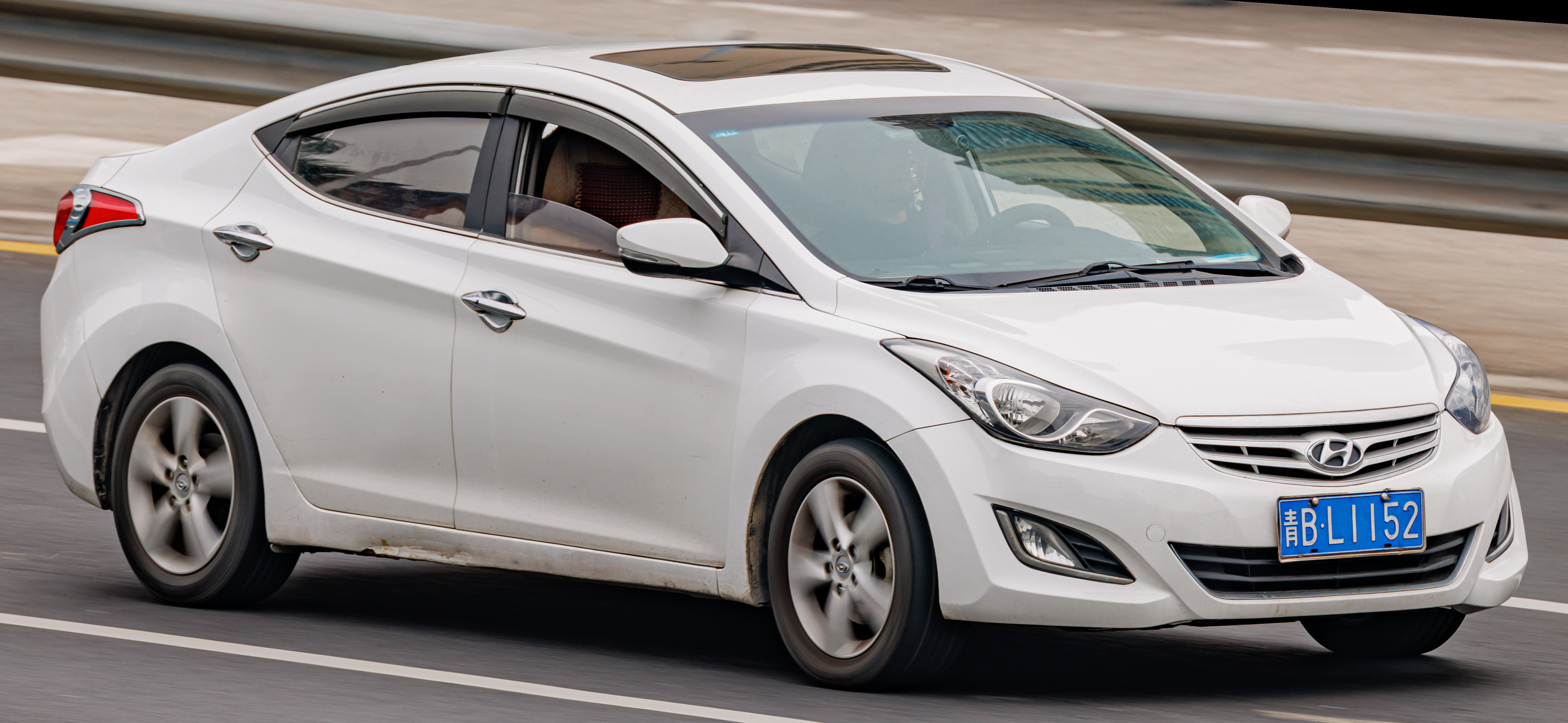
Hyundai Elantra Langdong (pre-facelift)

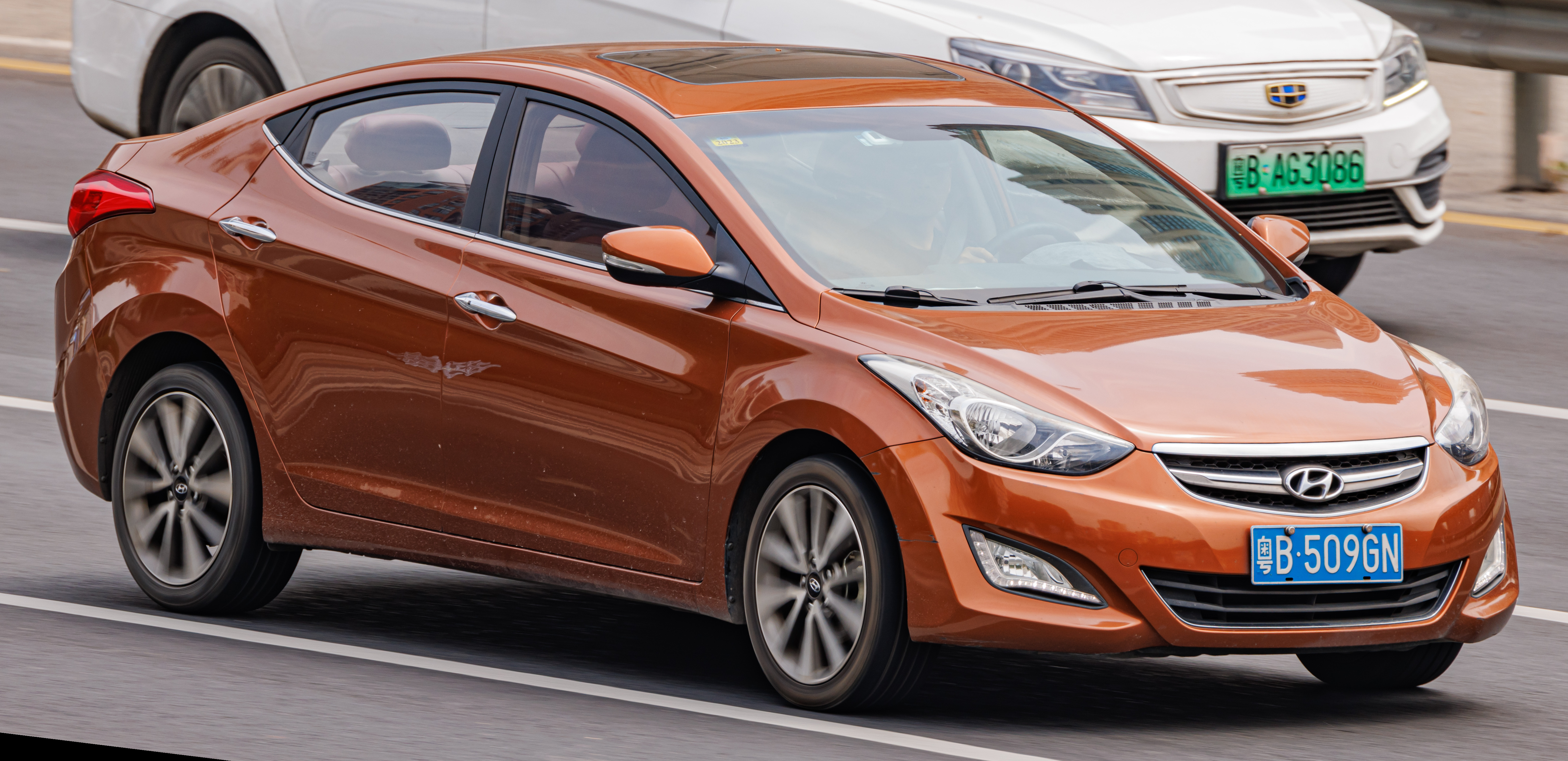
Hyundai Elantra Langdong (first facelift)

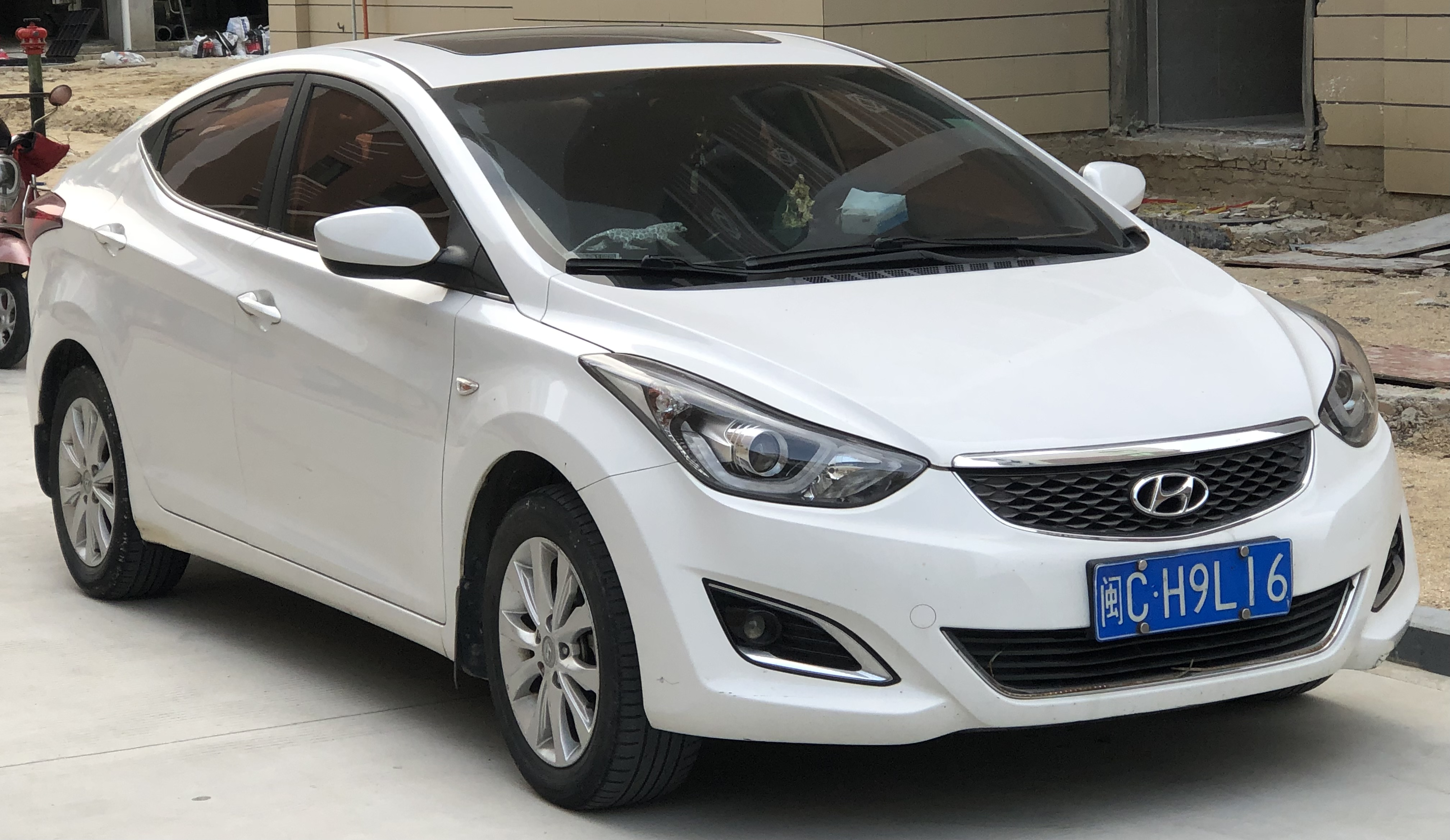
Hyundai Elantra Langdong (second facelift)

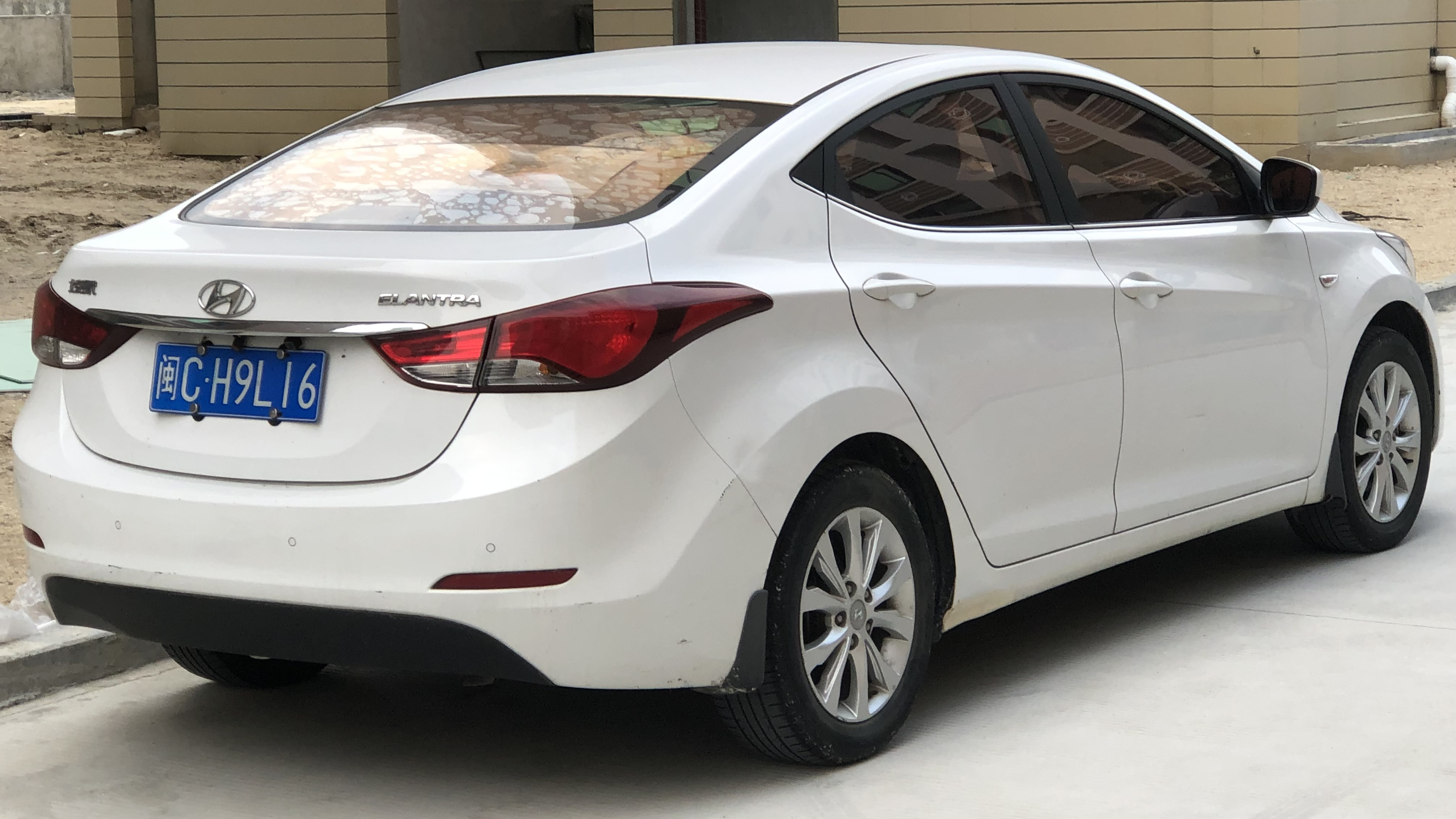
Hyundai Elantra Langdong (second facelift)

=== Coupe (JK; 2013–2014) ===
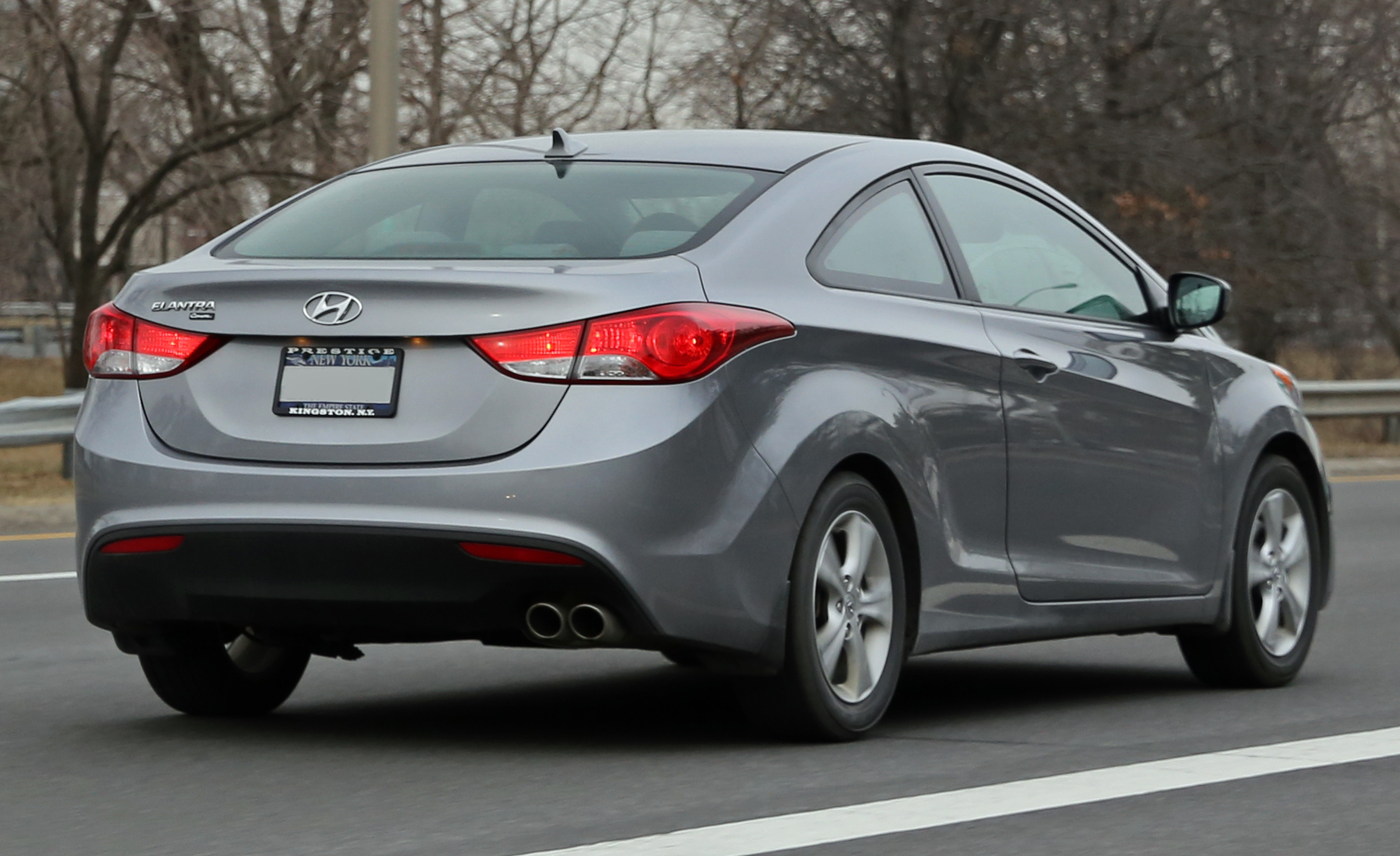
2014 Elantra Coupe (US)

For the 2013 model year, a coupe based on the sedan debuted. The coupe featured a continuation of Hyundai's Fluidic Sculpture body design language, with more aggressive styling than the sedan.

The vehicle was unveiled at the 2012 Busan International Motor Show. The production model included a 2.0 Nu GDi Engine with a 6-speed transmission.

The Elantra Coupe was discontinued after the 2014 model year in the US due to poor sales, allowing the brand to focus on the sedan and GT models.

=== Safety ===
Insurance Institute for Highway Safety (IIHS) was safety tested by IIHS in 2015

IIHS Hyundai Elantra scores:
Moderate overlap frontal offset	Acceptable
Small overlap frontal offset	Good
Side impact	Good
Roof strength	Good
Head restraints & seats	Good

ANCAP test results* Hyundai Elantra 1.8L GSL (2011)
Test	Score
Overall	5 /5 stars
Frontal offset	14.24/16
Side impact	13.97/16
Pole	2/2
Seat belt reminders	3/3
Whiplash protection	Not Assessed
Pedestrian protection	Adequate
Electronic stability control	Standard

== Sixth generation (AD; 2015) ==
Sixth generation
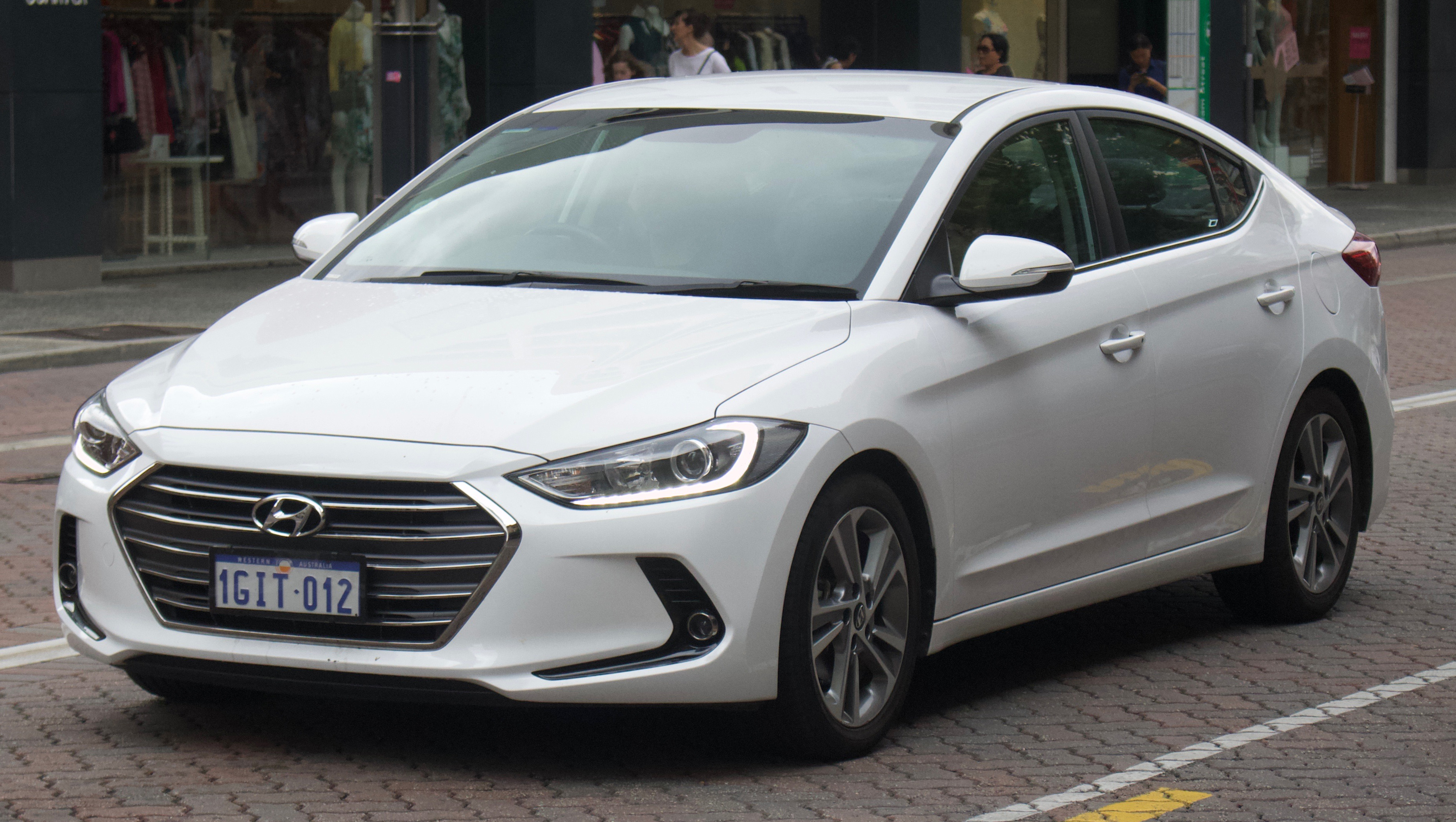

Overview
- Model code: AD
- Also called: Hyundai Avante (South Korea, Singapore - 2018 facelift only)
- Production: 2015–2020; 2016–2021 (China); 2021–2024, 2025-present (Pakistan); 2024-present (Egypt)
- Model years: 2017–2020
- Assembly: South Korea: Ulsan Plant 3 United States: Montgomery, Alabama (HMMA); China: Beijing (Beijing Hyundai); Taiwan: Hukou, Hsinchu (SYM); India: Chennai (HMIL); Russia: Kaliningrad (Avtotor); Malaysia: Kulim, Kedah (Inokom); Iran: Bam, Kerman (KMC); Algeria: Tiaret (TMC); Pakistan: Faisalabad (Hyundai Nishat); Vietnam: Ninh Bình (HTMV); Egypt: Cairo (GB Corp)
- Designer: Peter Schreyer

Body and chassis
- Body style: 4-door sedan

Powertrain
- Engine: Petrol: 1.4 L Kappa II T-GDi I4; 1.5 L Smartstream G1.5 MPi I4 (China); 1.6 L Gamma II MPi I4; 1.6 L Smartstream G1.6 MPi I4; 1.6 L Gamma II T-GDi I4; 2.0 L Nu MPi I4; LPG: 1.6 L Gamma LPi I4; Petrol hybrid: 1.6 L Smartstream G1.6 Hybrid I4 (China); Diesel: 1.6 L U II CRDi I4
- Transmission: 6-speed manual 6-speed automatic 7-speed DCT; CVT (Hyundai Intelligent Variable Transmission)

Dimensions
- Wheelbase: 2,700 mm (106.3 in)
- Length: 4,570–4,620 mm (179.9–181.9 in)
- Width: 1,800 mm (70.9 in)
- Height: 1,435 mm (56.5 in)
- Curb weight: 1,185–1,340 kg (2,612–2,954 lb) (1.6L); 1,215–1,350 kg (2,679–2,976 lb) (2.0L); 1,315–1,433 kg (2,899–3,159 lb) (1.6T Diesel); 1,296 kg (2,857 lb) (1.4T); 1,350–1,430 kg (2,976–3,153 lb) (1.6T)

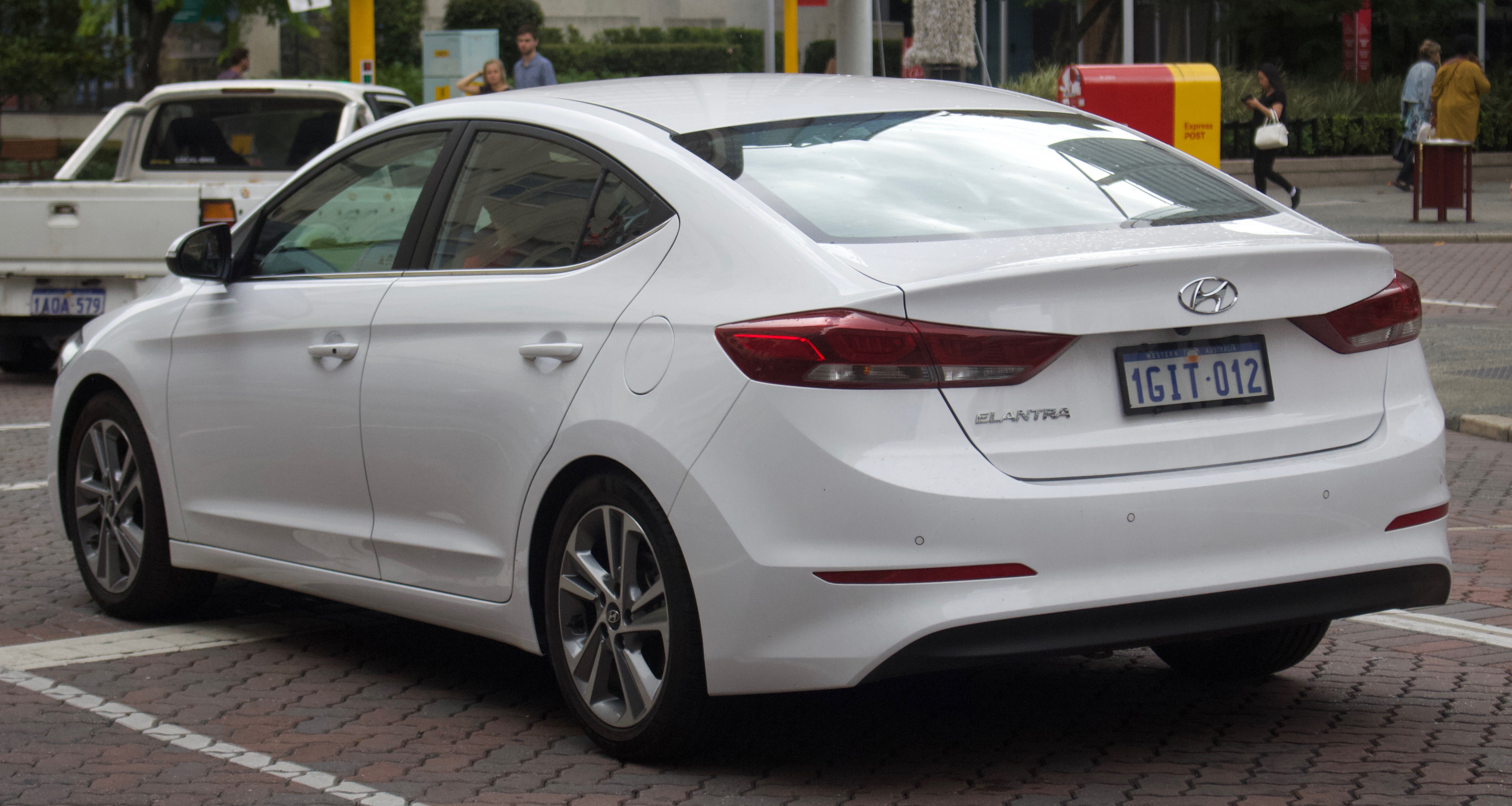
Hyundai Elantra Elite (Australia)

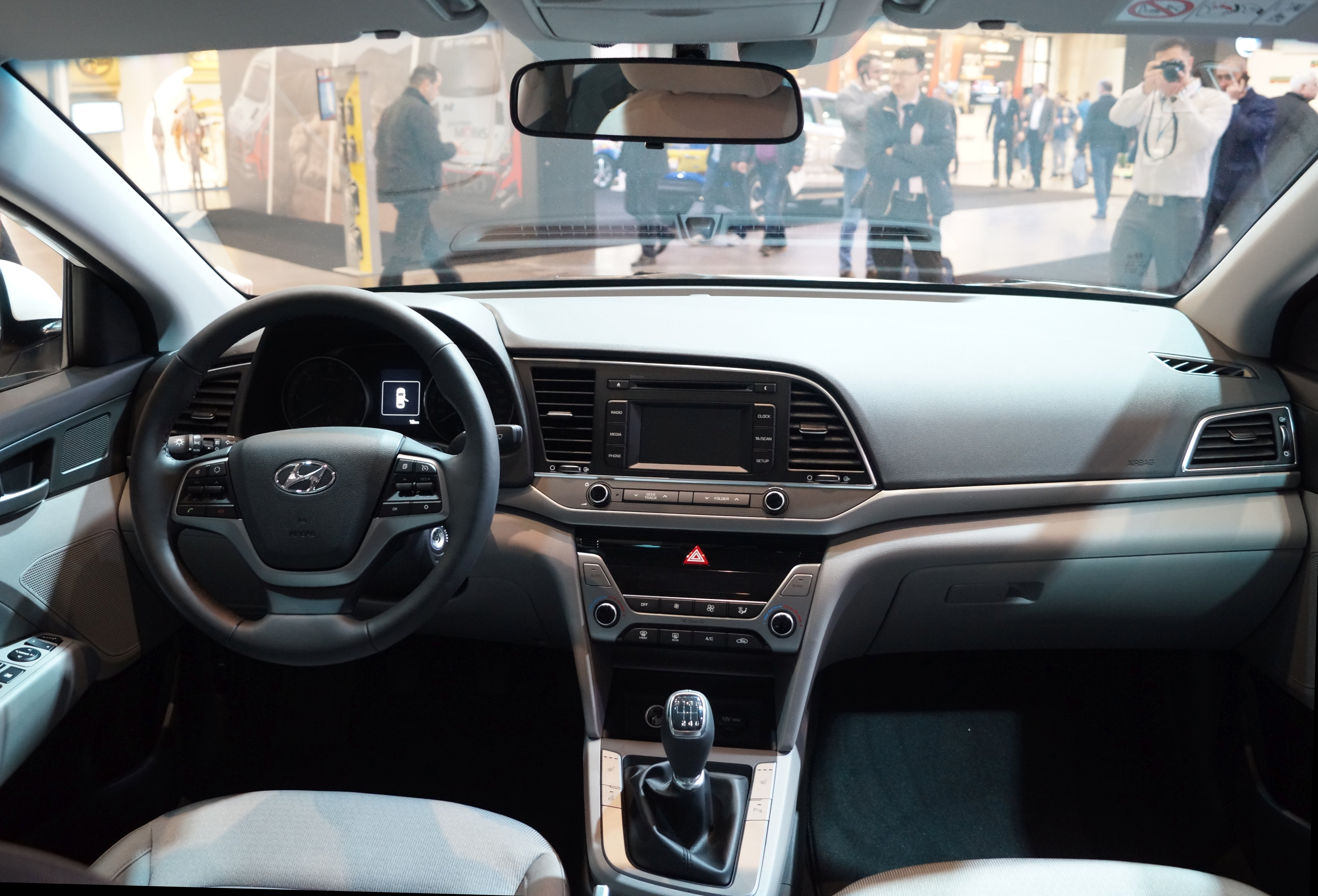
Interior (pre-facelift)

The sixth generation Elantra was launched in South Korea as the Avante in September 2015. The design of the car was resculpted to a more conservative appearance compared to the previous generation. The "fluidic sculpture" design that had persisted across the Hyundai portfolio since 2011 was reshaped with the sixth generation Elantra. The car is now more like a fastback with its roofline sloped from the windshield to the rear of the car and it has fewer curves overall with pentagonal head and taillights, a hexagonal grille, and redesigned body panels and bumper emphasizing straight lines along the body. The windshield is drawn back from the hood further than the prior generation, making for a more traditional sedan look. The interior is also less curved, with a cockpit, audio/temp controls, and glove compartment in a single bow line across the dash. This was done without reducing the interior cabin space of the prior generation.

In India, the AD series Hyundai Elantra launched on 23 August 2016 with petrol and diesel engine options. Its petrol variant displaces 2.0-litre, while the diesel engine is a 1.6-litre unit.

In the Philippines, the AD model Elantra was launched in 2016. It is available in GL (6-speed manual and 6-speed automatic options) and GLS (6-speed automatic) trims. It is powered by 1.6-litre engine for the former and 2.0-litre engine for the latter. The AD model Elantra was discontinued in late 2020.

For China, the Elantra AD model known as the Elantra Lingdong was introduced in March 2016. It is available with the 1.4 litre turbo, the 1.5 litre Smartstream engine specifically for its market, and the 1.6 litre Gamma II engine. A 7 speed dual clutch option is available as standard for the 1.4, a 6 speed manual option is available as standard for the 1.5 and 1.6 litre models alongside an optional CVT for the 1.5 and a 6 speed automatic for the 1.6.

=== North America ===
The sixth generation Elantra made its North American debut at the November 2015 Los Angeles Auto Show for the 2017 model year, and released for sale in the United States in January 2016, and in Canada in February 2016. Two trim levels are present in the 2017 model release: SE and Limited (Value Edition and Sport released later). While the Elantra is sold under the compact class, it classifies as a mid-size sedan according to the EPA.

Newly introduced for 2017 was the ECO Trim, a package which replaced the standard engine with a lower displacement turbocharged 1.4 L DOHC Inline-4, 128 hp (95 kW) Kappa engine along with a 7-speed dual clutch automatic transmission that improved MPG use for eco driving customers.

The new SE model came standard with fewer features compared to the prior generation trim level, and included a 147 hp (110 kW) 2.0 L Nu I4 engine and mated to either a 6-speed manual or 6-speed automatic transmission. The SE Popular Equipment package which included alloy wheels, cruise control, automatic headlights, and touchscreen stereo with Android Auto and Apple CarPlay support; and a Tech Package (required the Popular Equipment package) included LED daytime running lights, blind-spot and rear cross-traffic alert system, proximity key/push-button start, hands-free trunk access, and TFT monochromatic cluster display (in place of the standard LCD cluster). In North America, the SE Popular Equipment package was not available on SE models with the 6-speed manual transmission.

In the middle of the 2017 model year, steering wheel audio controls become standard equipment across all trims. A mid-level Value Edition trim was also added. On top of the Popular Equipment and Tech Package for the SE, it included a power-adjustable driver's seat, auto-dimming rearview mirror, a power sunroof, and an automatic up driver's power window.

Packages for the Limited Edition includes a Limited Tech Package with a power sunroof, touchscreen stereo with Android Auto and Apple CarPlay support, heated seats, and ClariFi module to enhance interior car audio; and the Ultimate Package (that requires the Limited Tech Package) which adds automatic emergency braking with pedestrian detection, smart cruise control, lane keep assist, and memory presets for mirrors/driver seat adjustments. For the 2018 model year, the SEL trim replaced the SE with Popular Equipment Package, and now includes blind-spot monitoring with rear-cross traffic alert and lane change assist, four-wheel disc brakes (instead of front disc brakes and rear drum brakes), and rear-seat cupholders instead of center console-mounted ones. Limited models receive glossy black interior accents and a standard auto-dimming rearview mirror. All models also receive a new machine grey exterior colour option and three years of complimentary Blue Link/Homelink services.

==== Elantra Sport ====
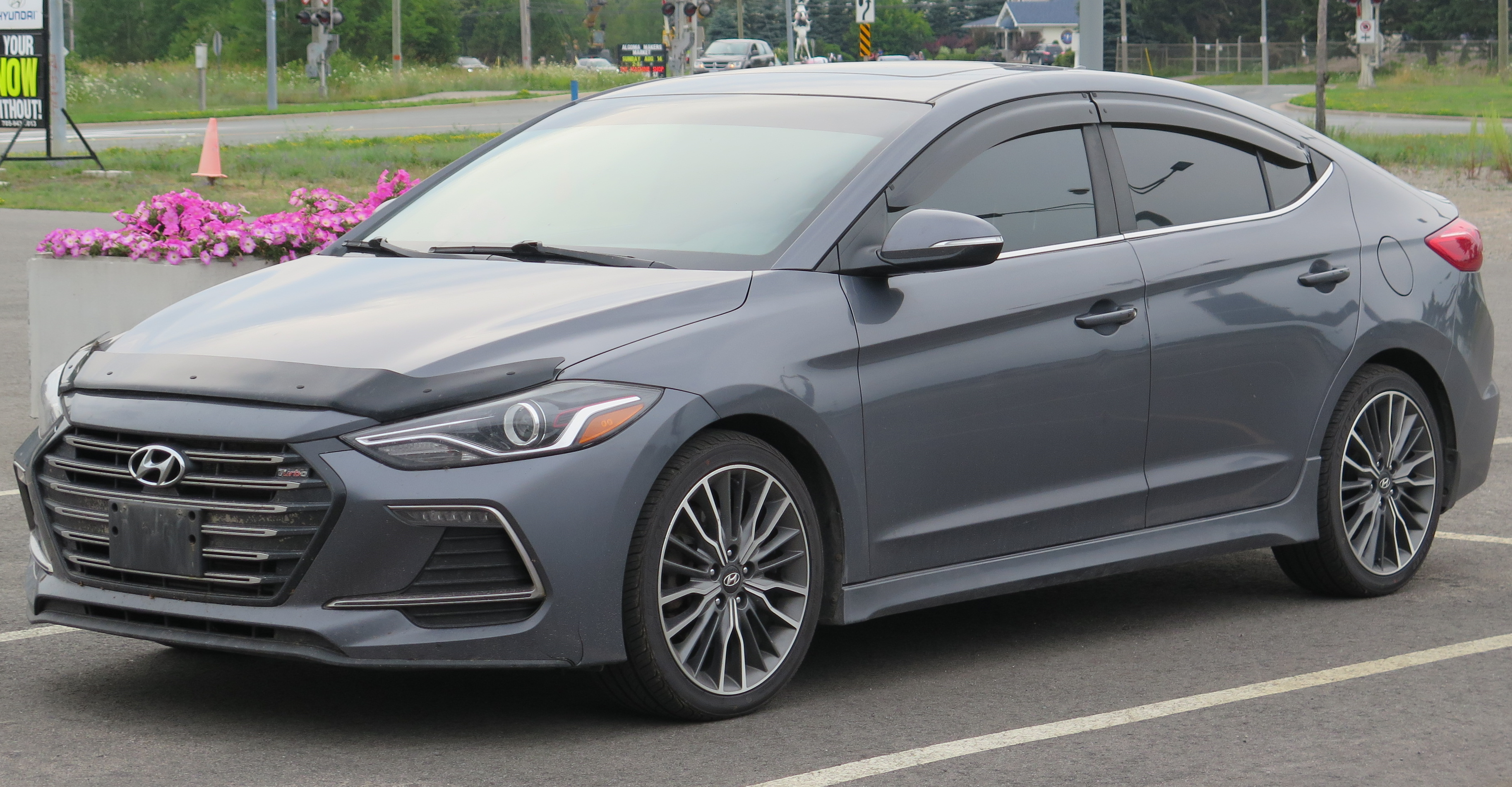

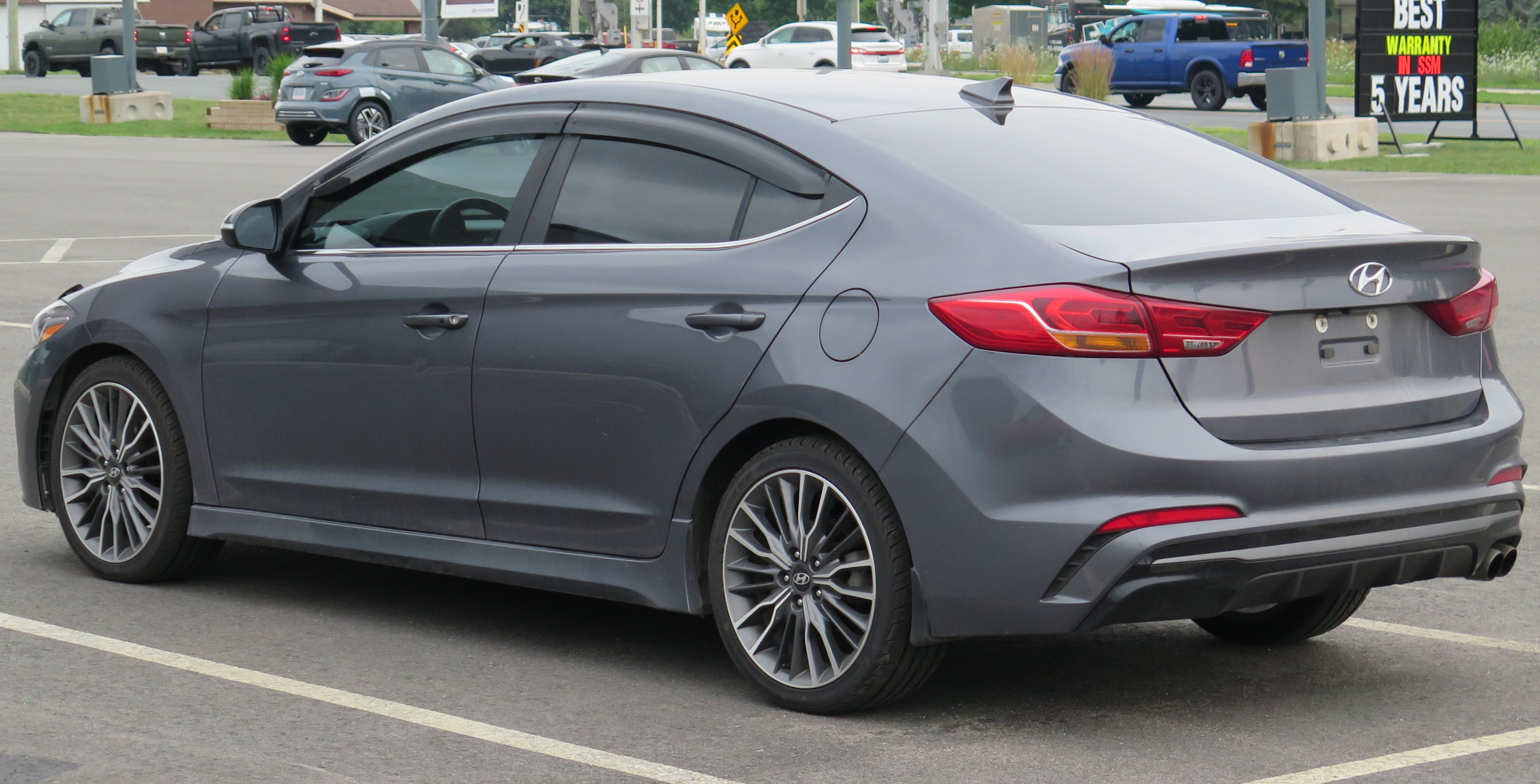
2017 Hyundai Elantra Sport (Canada)

Roughly halfway through the 2017 model year, Hyundai released a Sport model for the North American market. The Sport slots between the Eco and Limited models and was differentiated externally by different headlights and tail lights, ground effects, a more aggressive front and rear bumper as well as dual chrome-tipped exhaust outlets. Under the hood, the Sport featured a Turbocharged 1.6 L direct-injected I4 producing 201 hp (150 kW) and 195 lb⋅ft (264 N⋅m) of torque. Transmission options included a 7-speed dual-clutch automatic with manual shift mode or a traditional 6-speed manual. Additional modifications for the sport include a flat-bottomed steering wheel, red stitching on the seats, shift boot and steering wheel, larger front brakes, 18" alloy wheels, an independent multi-link rear suspension, a thicker front stabilizer bar, and a lower ratio steering ratio for a quicker feel.

The 2018 model year added an optional power sunroof and blind-spot monitoring, with rear cross-traffic alert and lane change assist standard. The Elantra Sport was discontinued in 2020 to make way for the Hyundai Elantra N-Line.

=== Engines ===
The 2019 Elantra 2.0 offered a six-speed automatic transmission. For the 2020 model year, the 2.0 engine was paired with the continuously variable automatic transmission (CVT) used in the 2019 Kia Forte, enabling the 2020 Elantra SE to match the Forte FE's 41 miles per U.S. gallon EPA fuel economy rating on the highway. Higher 2.0 trims, which have added weight and different tires, are rated at 40 mpg on the EPA highway test. The U.S. fueleconomy.gov website shows a city rating of 31 mpg for the 2020 Elantra SE and 30 mpg for higher trims.

The 1.4 Turbo and 1.6 Turbo engines were offered on the 2019 Elantra sedan in the United States, but not in Canada.

Model	Year	Transmission	Power	Torque	0–100 km/h (0–62 mph) (official)	Top speed
petrol
1.4 L Kappa II T-GDi	2015–2020	7-speed DCT	130 PS (96 kW; 128 hp) @ 5,500 rpm	21.5 kg⋅m (211 N⋅m; 156 lbf⋅ft) @ 1,400–3,700 rpm	8.1s	195 km/h (121 mph)
1.6 L Gamma II MPi	2015–2020	6-speed manual	127.5 PS (94 kW; 126 hp) @ 6,300 rpm	15.77 kg⋅m (155 N⋅m; 114 lbf⋅ft) @ 4,850 rpm	10.1s	200 km/h (124 mph)
1.6 L Gamma II MPi	2015–2020	6-speed automatic	127.5 PS (94 kW; 126 hp) @ 6,300 rpm	15.77 kg⋅m (155 N⋅m; 114 lbf⋅ft) @ 4,850 rpm	11.6s	195 km/h (121 mph)
1.6 L Smartstream G1.6 MPi	2018–2020	CVT	123 PS (90 kW; 121 hp) @ 6,300 rpm	15.7 kg⋅m (154 N⋅m; 114 lbf⋅ft) @ 4,500 rpm		
1.6 L Gamma II T-GDi	2016–2020	6-speed manual	203.6 PS (150 kW; 201 hp) @ 6,000 rpm	27.0 kg⋅m (265 N⋅m; 195 lbf⋅ft) @ 1,500–4,500 rpm	8.0s	210 km/h (130 mph)
1.6 L Gamma II T-GDi	2016–2020	7-speed DCT	203.6 PS (150 kW; 201 hp) @ 6,000 rpm	27.0 kg⋅m (265 N⋅m; 195 lbf⋅ft) @ 1,500–4,500 rpm	7.7s	210 km/h (130 mph)
2.0 L Nu MPi	2015–2020	6-speed manual	152–156 PS (112–115 kW; 150–154 hp) @ 6,200 rpm	19.6–19.9 kg⋅m (192–195 N⋅m; 142–144 lbf⋅ft) @ 4,500 rpm	8.6s-8.8s	205–207 km/h (127–129 mph)
2.0 L Nu MPi	2015–2020	6-speed automatic	152–156 PS (112–115 kW; 150–154 hp) @ 6,200 rpm	19.6–19.9 kg⋅m (192–195 N⋅m; 142–144 lbf⋅ft) @ 4,500 rpm	9.6s-9.9s	202–203 km/h (126–126 mph)
2.0 L Nu MPi	2015–2020	CVT	149 PS (110 kW; 147 hp) @ 6,200 rpm	18.3 kg⋅m (179 N⋅m; 132 lbf⋅ft) @ 4,500 rpm		
LPG
1.6 L Gamma LPi	2015–2020	6-speed automatic	120 PS (88 kW; 118 hp) @ 6,000 rpm	15.5 kg⋅m (152 N⋅m; 112 lbf⋅ft) @ 4,500 rpm		
Diesel
1.6 L U II CRDi	2015–2020	6-speed manual	136 PS (100 kW; 134 hp) @ 4,000 rpm	30.6 kg⋅m (300 N⋅m; 221 lbf⋅ft) @ 1,750–2,500 rpm	10.5s	190 km/h (118 mph)
1.6 L U II CRDi	2015–2020	7-speed DCT	136 PS (100 kW; 134 hp) @ 4,000 rpm	30.6 kg⋅m (300 N⋅m; 221 lbf⋅ft) @ 1,750–2,500 rpm	11.0s	190 km/h (118 mph)

=== Elantra Lingdong PHEV ===
The Hyundai Elantra Lingdong PHEV officially launched in China in August 2019 and is produced by Beijing Hyundai, a joint venture by BAIC and Hyundai. The Elantra Lingdong PHEV features a restyled front bumper, and is powered by a 1.6 litre engine producing 105 PS with an electric motor driving. The Elantra Lingdong PHEV is capable of an all-electric range up to 85 km, with the fuel consumption of only 1 litre per 100 km under comprehensive conditions.

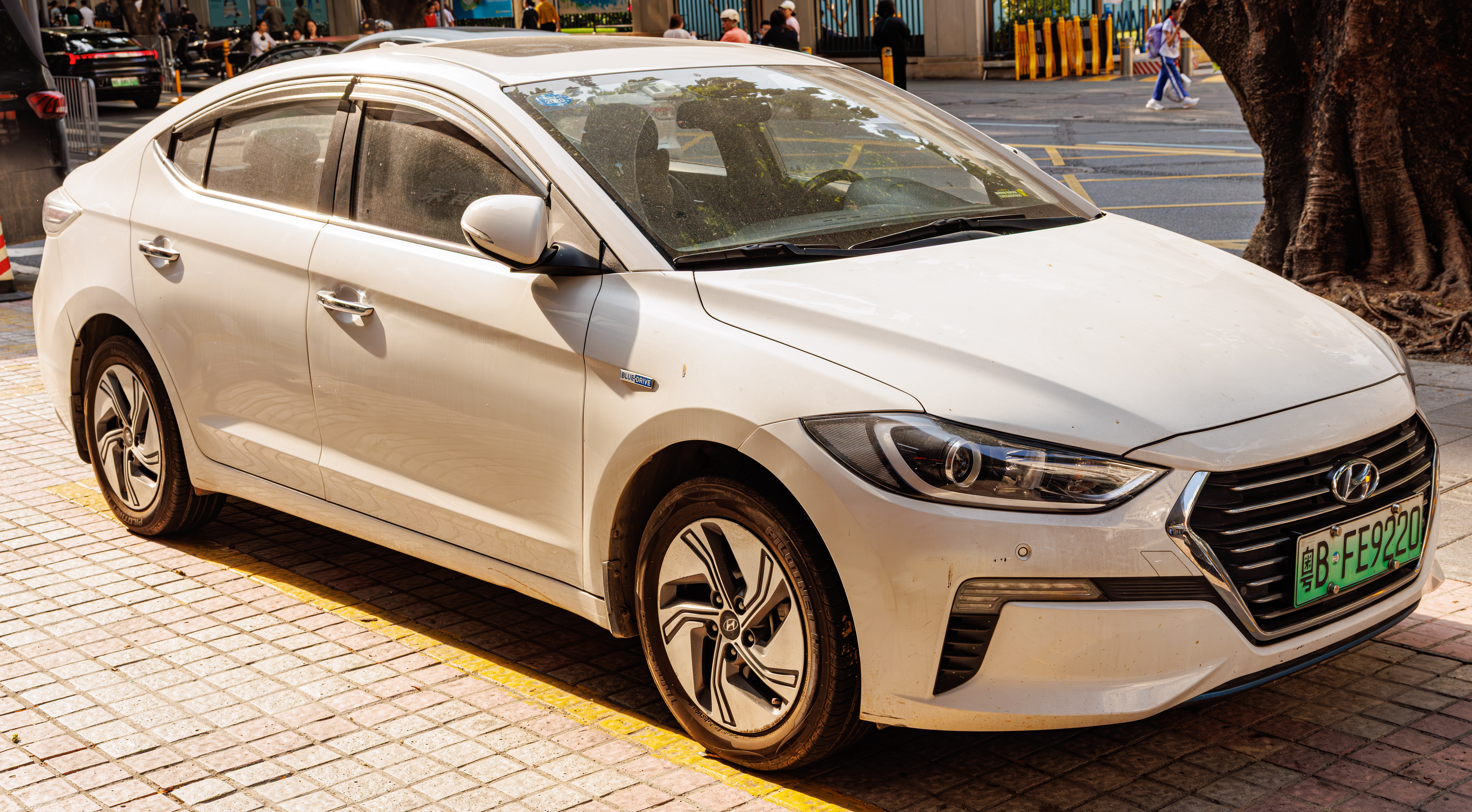
Hyundai Elantra Lingdong PHEV Front view

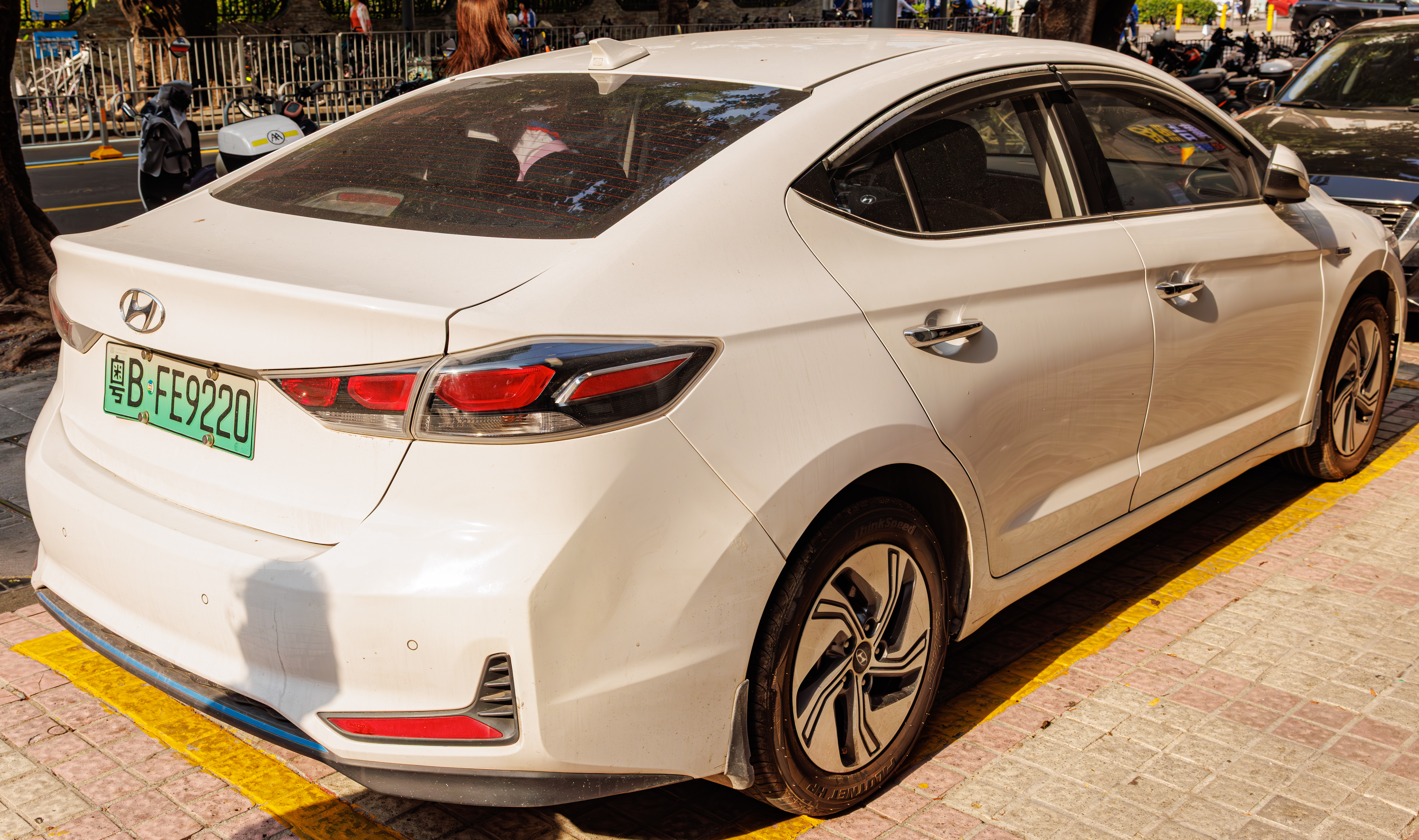
Hyundai Elantra Lingdong PHEV Rear view

=== 2018 facelift ===
On 6 September 2018, the facelifted Avante was launched in South Korea. Despite widespread initial criticism for its design in Korea, the Avante became the fifth best-selling car in the South Korean market. It received a new exterior look, new wheel designs, new safety features and an updated center stack. The new redesign's exterior changes include a new rear with redesigned tail lights, "ELANTRA" written across the back (on the USDM mode) and a hidden trunk release within the Hyundai emblem.

Interior design changes include revised HVAC controls for both manual and automatic systems and newly designed vents. The steering wheel has also been changed to the same design shared with the Kona, Veloster, and Elantra GT. The instrument cluster has an updated font, center display, and a checkerboard pattern. A new 5-inch touchscreen audio is now standard on the base SE trim and comes with a backup camera. The center storage in front of the shifter no longer has a door to conceal storage in order to accommodate the available Qi wireless charging dock for compatible smartphones. Rear heated seats are also no longer an option.

In the United States, the facelifted Elantra went on sale for the 2019 model year. New triangular headlights included LED headlights as an option, removing the previously available adaptive HID headlights. The SEL trim and above now includes previously optional advanced safety equipment, including Forward Collision Avoidance, Lane Keep Assist, and Drive Attention Alert.

Other than South Korea, the facelifted version of the car was also launched as the Avante in Singapore on 10 January 2019, at the 2019 Singapore Motorshow. The Avante was launched with 3 variants, the base model, S variant and Elite variant. As compared to the other 2 higher specification variants, the base model does not come with LED daytime running lights, LED tail lights, keyless engine start, electric folding side mirrors, cruise control and features 15" alloy wheels, as compared to 16" alloy wheels on the other 2 variants. The Elite variant has additional features such as LED headlights, an electric driver seat, multi-zone air conditioning and rain sensing wipers as compared to the S variant.

Hyundai Nishat started assembly of the facelifted model in Pakistan in the last quarter of 2020. Initially, it came in only one variant equipped with 2.0 L Nu MPi engine but later on, a second variant with 1.6 L Gamma II MPi engine was also introduced. Both variants come with 6-speed automatic transmission.

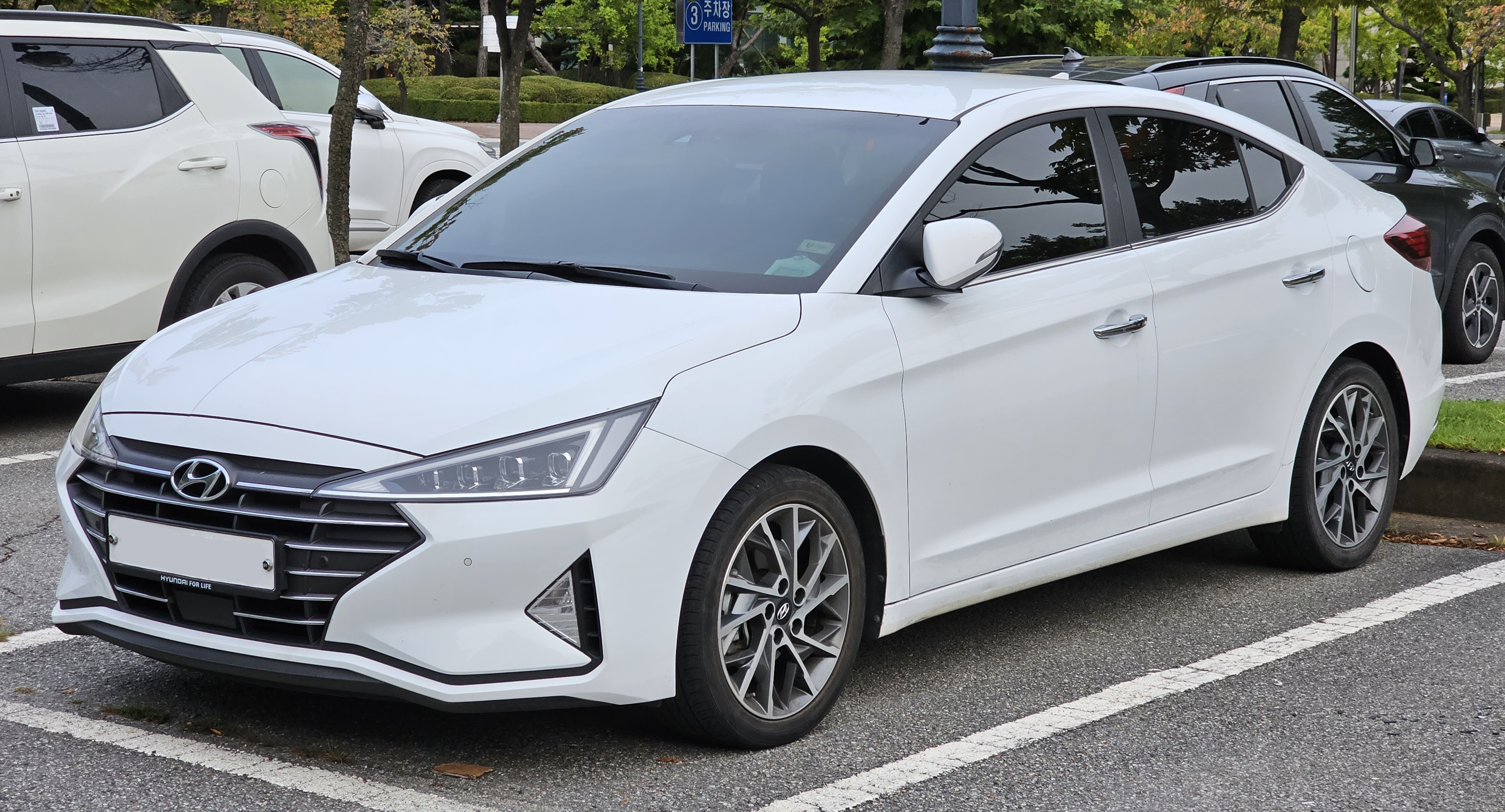
Hyundai Avante (facelift)

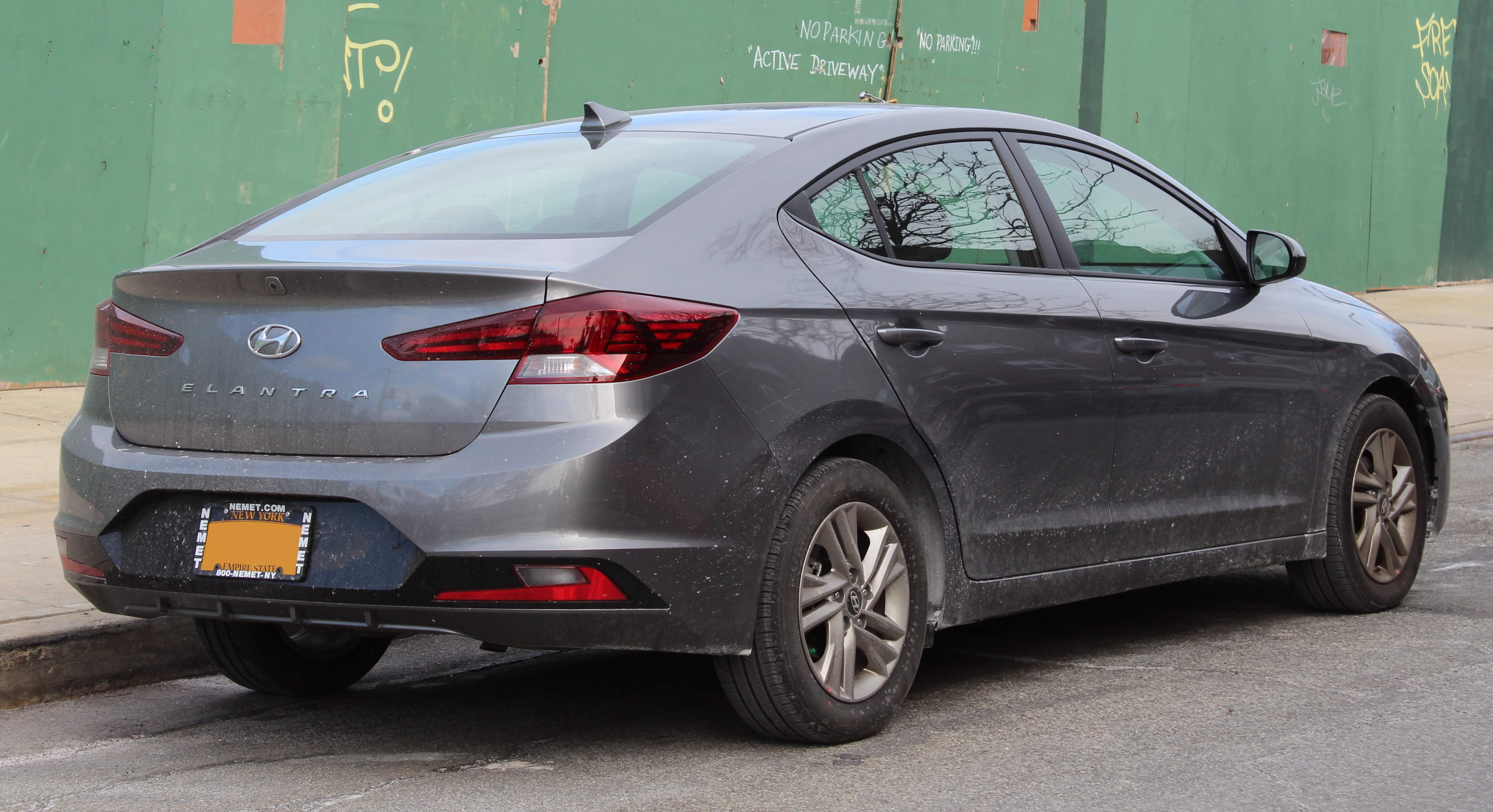
2019 Hyundai Elantra SEL (US)

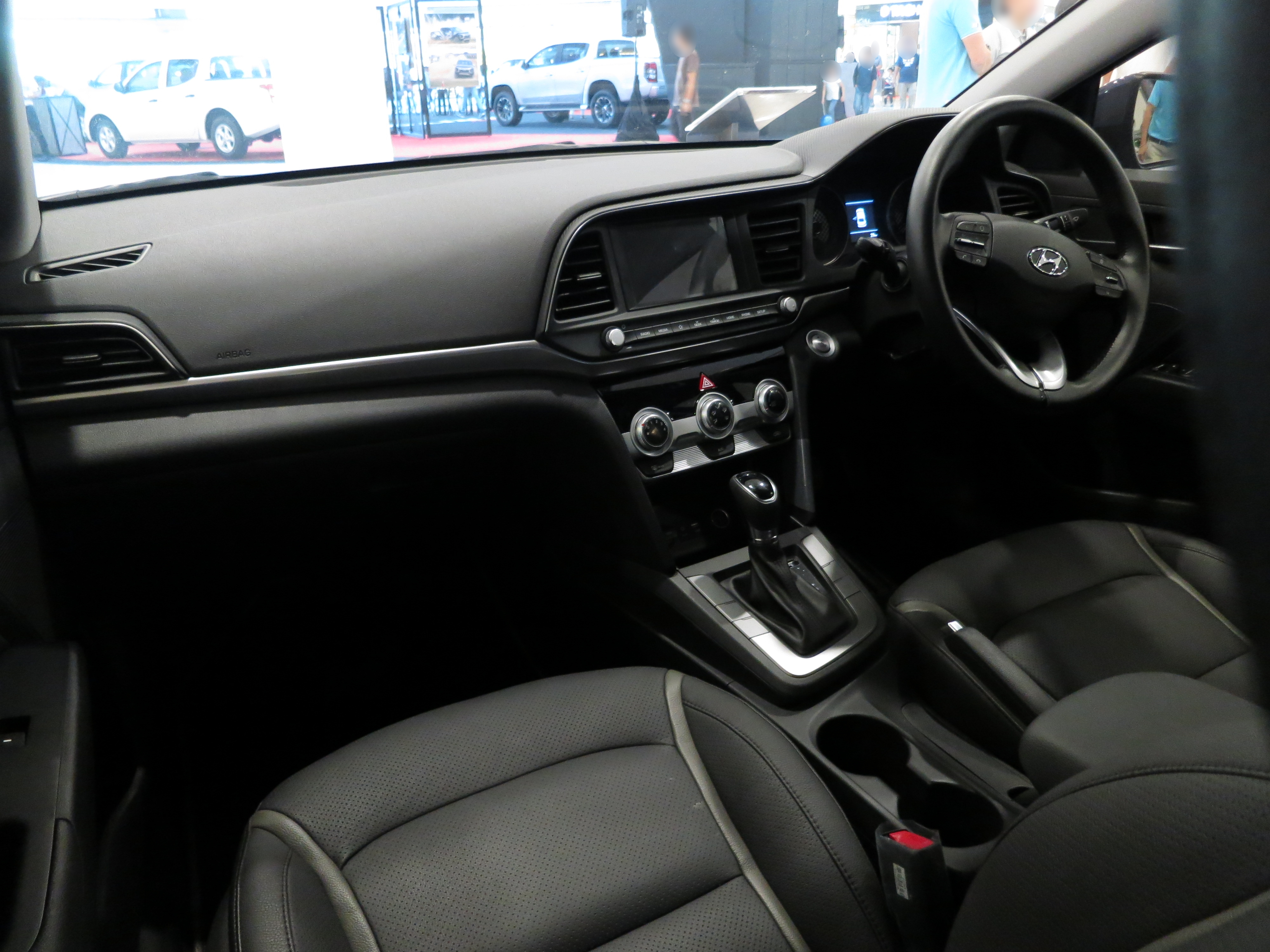
Interior

=== Safety ===
Insurance Institute for Highway Safety (IIHS) was safety tested by IIHS in 2017

IIHS Hyundai Elantra scores:
Moderate overlap frontal offset	Good
Small overlap frontal offset	Good
Side impact	Good
Roof strength	Good
Head restraints & seats	Good

Insurance Institute for Highway Safety (IIHS) was safety tested by IIHS in 2020

IIHS Hyundai Elantra scores:
Moderate overlap frontal offset	Good
Small overlap frontal offset	Good
Side impact	Good
Roof strength	Good
Head restraints & seats	Good

ANCAP test results* Hyundai Elantra all variants including turbo (2016)
Test	Score
Overall	5 /5 stars
Frontal offset	14.01/16
Side impact	16/16
Pole	2/2
Seat belt reminders	3/3
Whiplash protection	Good
Pedestrian protection	Adequate
Electronic stability control	Standard

ASEAN NCAP test results Hyundai Elantra (2016)
Test	Points	Stars
Adult occupant:	14.73	4 /5 stars
Child occupant:	77%	4 /5 stars
Safety assist:	NA	

ASEAN NCAP test results Hyundai Elantra (2016)
Test	Points	Stars
Adult occupant:	14.73	5 /5 stars
Child occupant:	77%	4 /5 stars
Safety assist:	NA	

== Seventh generation (CN7; 2020) ==
Seventh generation
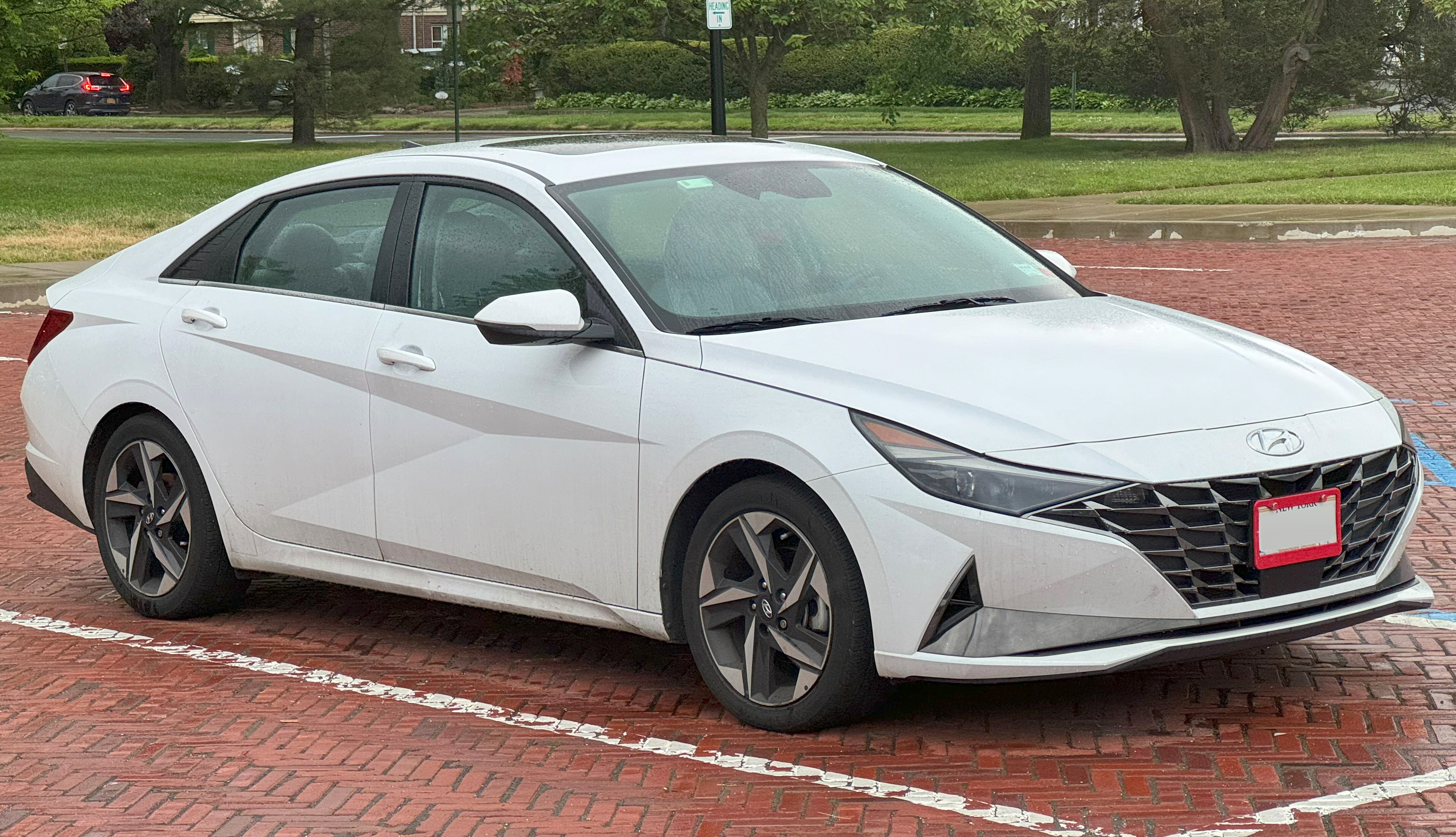
- 2021 Hyundai Elantra Limited (US)

Overview
- Model code: CN7
- Also called: Hyundai Avante (South Korea, Singapore); Hyundai i30 Sedan (Australia)
- Production: 2020–2026; 2021–present (China)
- Model years: 2021–2026
- Assembly: South Korea: Ulsan (Ulsan Plant 3); United States: Montgomery, Alabama (HMMA, 2020–2023); China: Beijing (Beijing Hyundai); Vietnam: Ninh Bình (HTMV); Pakistan: Faisalabad (Hyundai Nishat)
- Designer: Luc Donckerwolke; Kangmin Yeh (interior)

Body and chassis
- Body style: 4-door sedan
- Platform: Hyundai-Kia K3
- Related: Kia K4 (CL4)

Powertrain
- Engine: Petrol: 1.4 L Smartstream G1.4 T-GDi I4; 1.5 L Smartstream G1.5 MPi I4; 1.6 L Gamma MPi I4; 1.6 L Smartstream G1.6 MPi I4; 1.6 L Smartstream G1.6 T-GDi I4; 2.0 L Smartstream G2.0 MPi I4; 2.0 L Theta II T-GDi I4; Petrol LPG: 1.6 L Gamma LPi I4; Petrol hybrid: 1.6 L Smartstream G1.6 Hybrid I4
- Electric motor: 32 kW Interior-permanent magnet synchronous
- Transmission: 6-speed manual; 6-speed automatic; 6-speed D6KF1 DCT; 7-speed D7UF1 DCT; 8-speed D8LF1 DCT; CVT
- Hybrid drivetrain: Parallel hybrid (Elantra Hybrid)

Dimensions
- Wheelbase: 2,720 mm (107.1 in)
- Length: 4,650–4,710 mm (183.1–185.4 in)
- Width: 1,825 mm (71.9 in); 1,810 mm (71.3 in) (China)
- Height: 1,415–1,430 mm (55.7–56.3 in)
- Curb weight: 1,160–1,340 kg (2,557–2,954 lb); 1,445–1,495 kg (3,186–3,296 lb) (N)

Chronology
- Predecessor: Hyundai Ioniq Hybrid (For Elantra Hybrid)

The seventh generation Elantra, which was released for the 2021 model year, was unveiled on 17 March 2020 in West Hollywood virtualy due to the COVID-19 pandemic, with the model code name CN7. It introduced Hyundai's a new "Parametric Dynamics" design language, featuring longer and wider body proportions and a fastback-style rear design that emphasized a sportier sedan appearance. The interior features more rear legroom and a new instrument panel design with available twin digital display screens. The car went on sale in late 2020 in the U.S. and Canada.

The facelifted seventh-generation Elantra continues to be offered in several markets with gasoline, hybrid, N Line and high-performance Elantra N variants, depending on market.

This Elantra includes Hyundai’s Smart Sense safety technology which includes Forward Collision-Avoidance Assist (FCA), Blind-Spot Collision-Avoidance Assist (BCA), Rear Cross Traffic Collision-Avoidance Assist (RCCA), Lane Keeping Assist (LKA), Lane Following Assist (LFA), and Smart Cruise Control with Stop & Go (SCC).

It was selected as the 2021 North American Car of the Year.

In Australia, the seventh-generation Elantra is badged as the i30 Sedan, to allow Hyundai to integrate the Elantra with the popular i30 hatchback for much higher combined sales figures. It is available in the base level i30 sedan trim, i30 sedan hybrid, i30 N-Line sedan, and i30 N trims.

In China, the Elantra was introduced in October 2020 for the 2021 model year. The Elantra is available in two models known as 1.5 and N-Line. Standard engines consist of the 1.5 litre naturally aspirated unit paired to a CVT transmission for 1.5 models and the 1.4 litre turbo is paired to a 7-speed dual clutch automatic transmission for the N-Line. N-Line trims are known as Leading, Elite, Premium, and Flagship with actual trims known as GLS, GLX, LUX, and TOP.

This generation is also the first in China to not offer a manual transmission option since local assembling and production began in 2003, including the Hyundai Elantra N.

In Singapore, the car was launched on October 7, 2020, as the Avante (CN7), retaining the same model name as the Korean domestic market. It is offered in three variants; the Auto, S and Elite trims. All three models come with the same 1.6-litre 4-cylinder in-line 16-valve DOHC petrol engine and an IVT transmission. The Auto and S variants are equipped with standard halogen headlights, a distinction from the premium Elite variant, which features full LED illumination. Furthermore, the S and Elite variants include advanced driver-assistance systems (ADAS) not present on the Auto model. These systems comprise rain-sensing wipers and Hyundai's comprehensive safety suite, including Forward Collision-Avoidance Assist, Lane Keeping and Following Assist, Blind-Spot Collision Warning, and Rear Cross-Traffic Collision-Avoidance Assist. Regarding comfort features, the Elite variant provides power-adjustable seating for both the passenger and driver, with the driver's seat including two memory settings. The S variant offers a power-adjustable driver's seat only. The Elite is the exclusive variant to include a sunroof. All models are standard-equipped with alloy wheels.

In Vietnam, the seventh-generation Elantra was introduced on 14 October 2022 and is offered in three grade levels; Standard, Special and N-Line. Engine options include the 1.6-litre petrol engine paired with 6-speed automatic on Standard and Special grades, the 2.0-litre petrol engine paired with 6-speed automatic on Special grade, while the N-Line grade gets the Smartstream G 1.6-litre T-GDi engine paired with 7-speed DCT.

In the Philippines, the seventh-generation Elantra was introduced on 4 April 2024 as the high-performance N model. The regular Elantra range was introduced on 11 April 2025 with five variants: 1.6 STD, 1.6 GL, 1.6 HEV GLS, 1.6 HEV Premium and 1.6T N Line.

The seventh-generation Elantra was not widely sold in Europe. Contemporary automotive media described the CN7-generation Elantra/i30 Sedan as not sold in Europe, while official regional materials show that the model was offered through selected distributor markets, including Turkey and Ukraine.

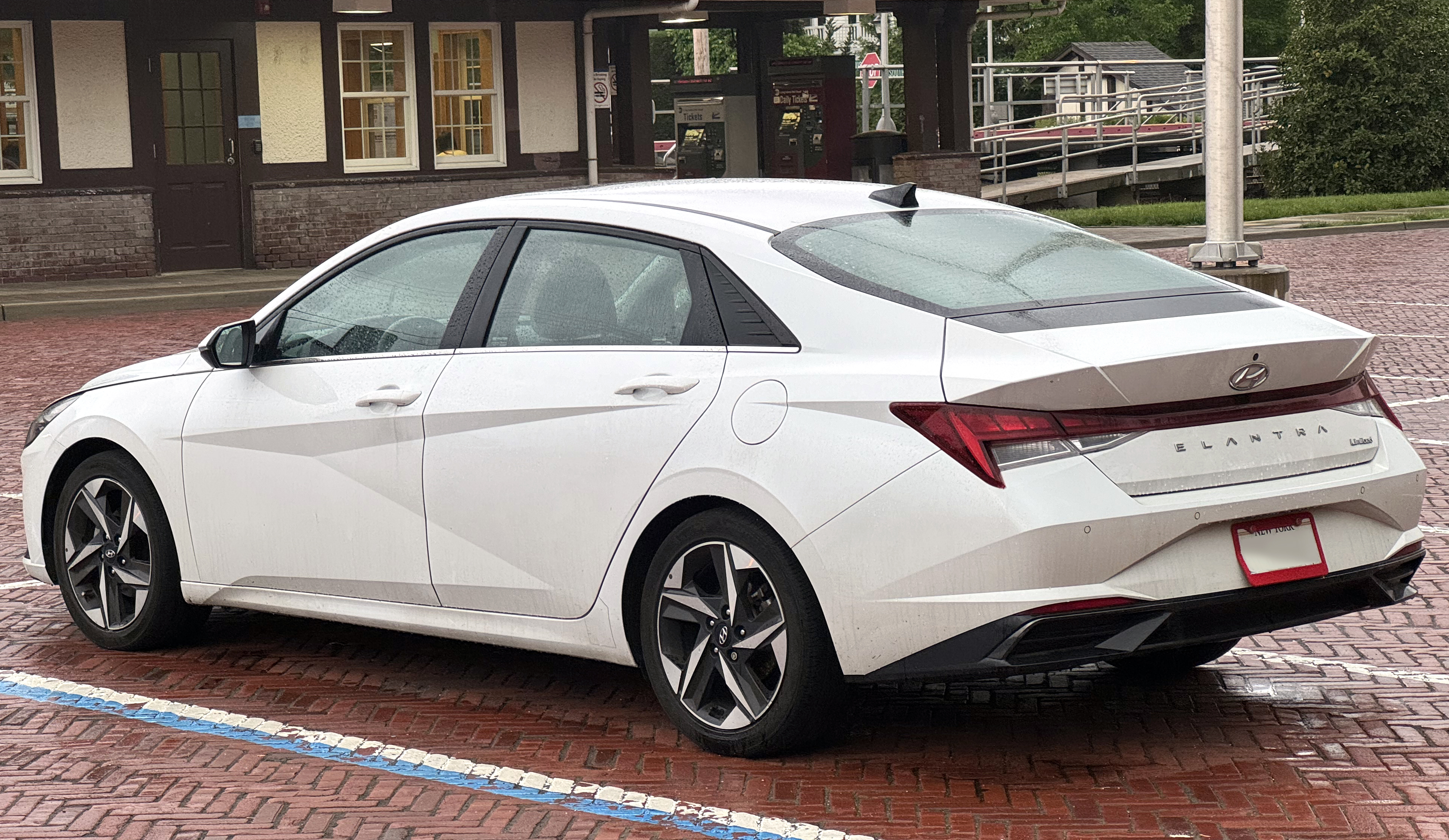
Rear view (pre-facelift)

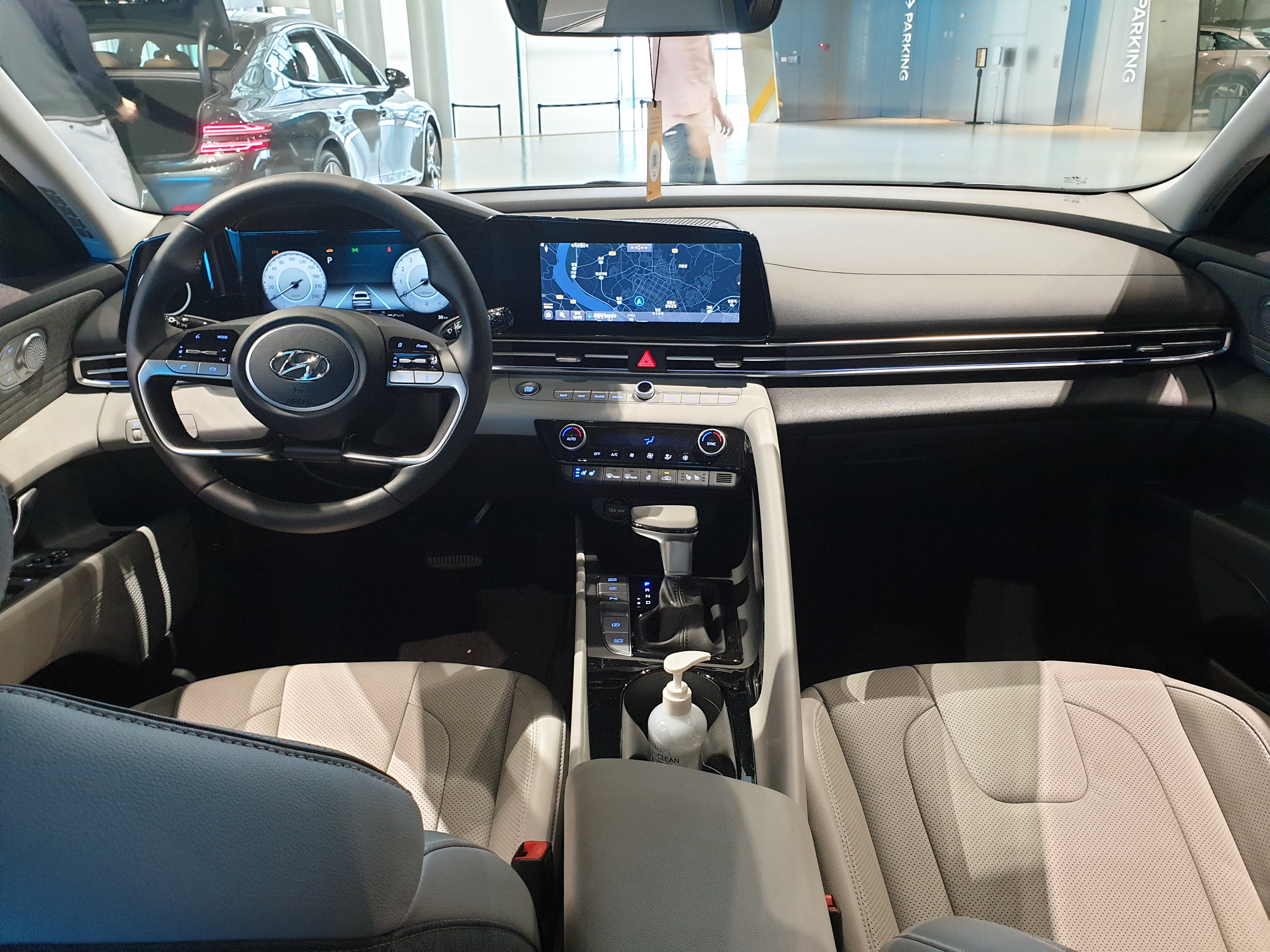
Interior

=== N-Line ===
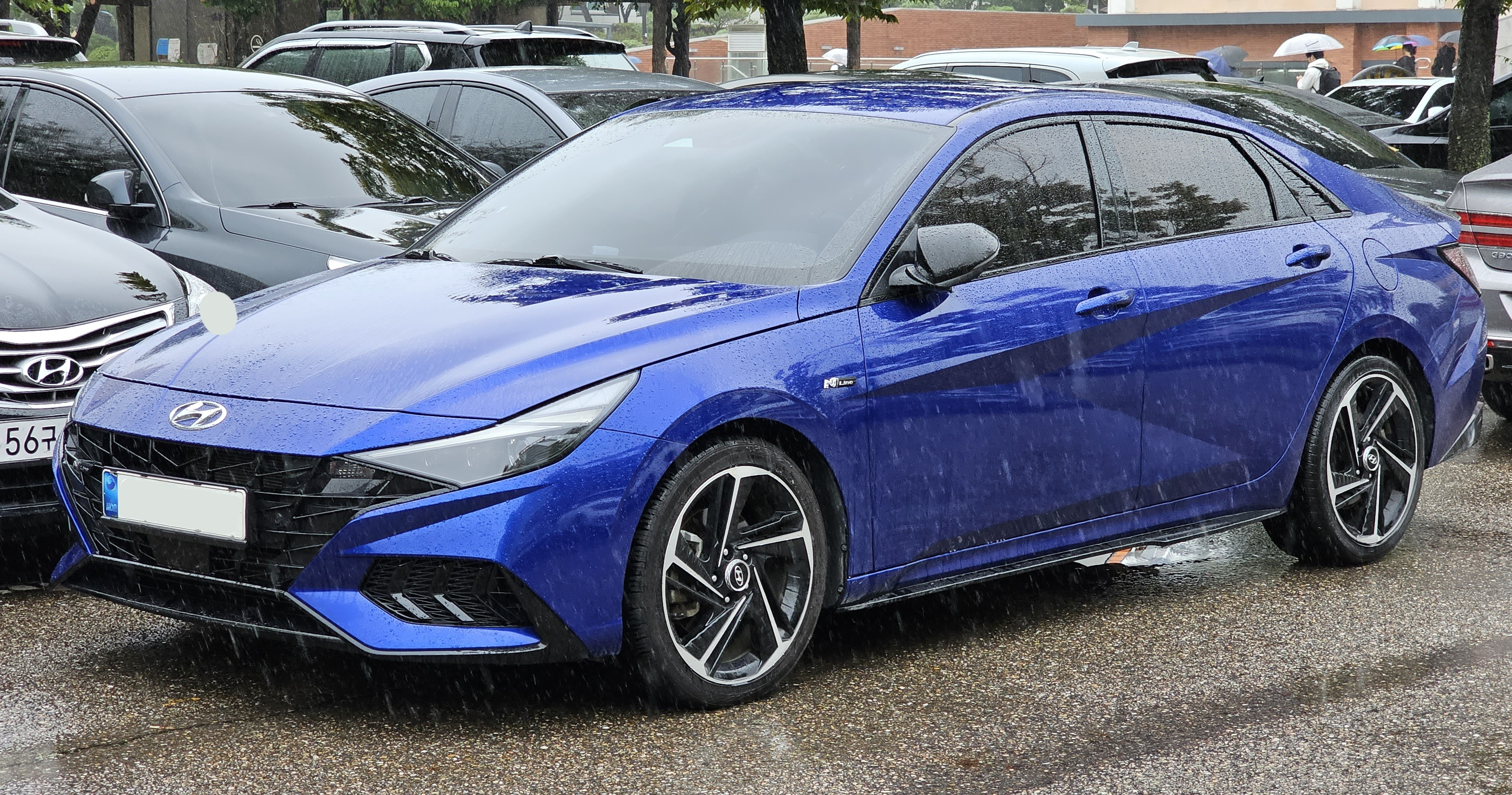
2022 Avante N-Line (pre-facelift)

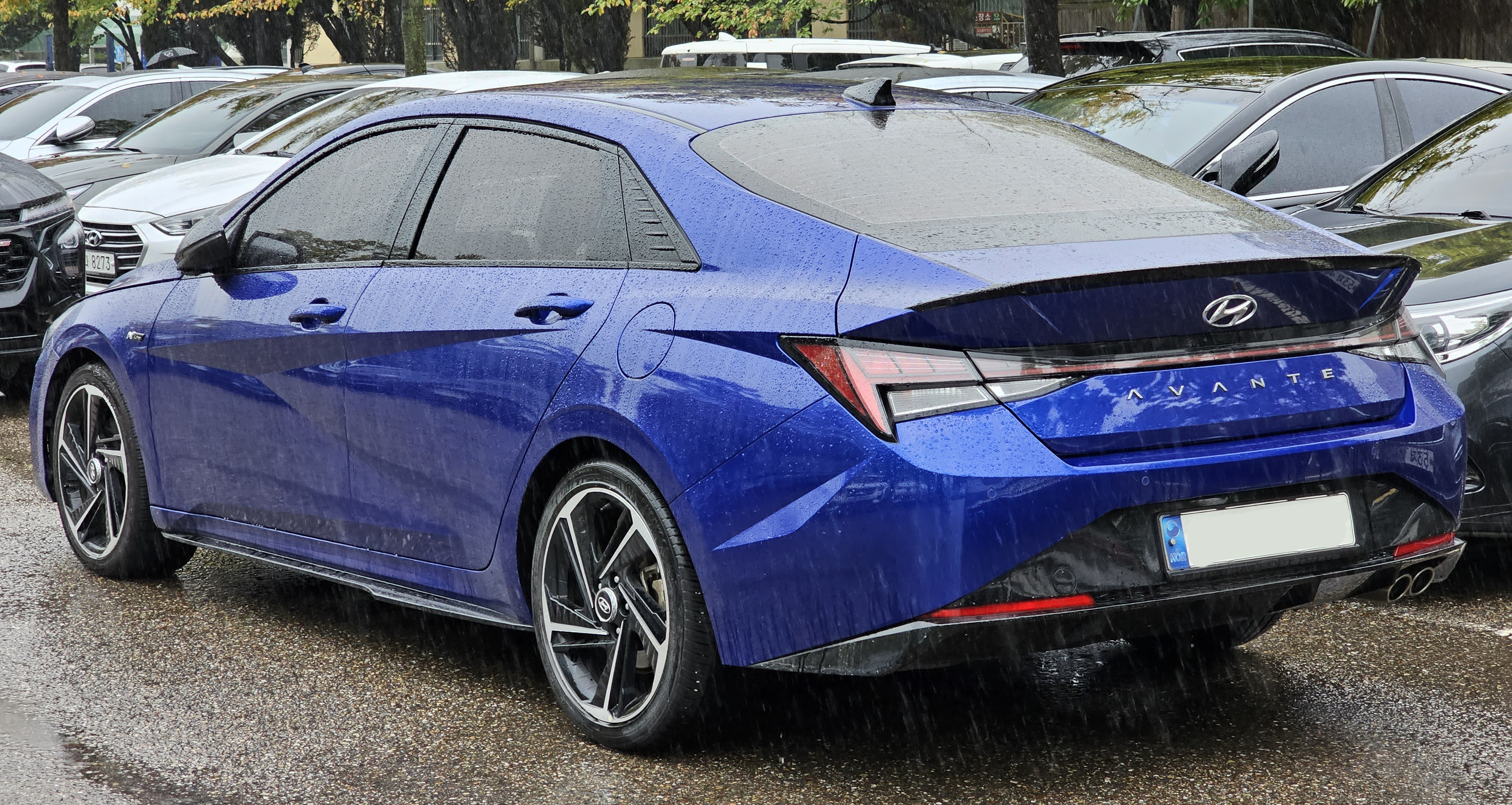
2022 Avante N-Line (pre-facelift)

The Elantra N Line was introduced as a sport-oriented variant of the seventh-generation Elantra and as an entry point to Hyundai’s N performance brand lineup. It is powered by a 1.6-litre turbocharged gasoline engine, paired with either a six-speed manual transmission or a seven-speed dual-clutch transmission depending on market, and features N Line-specific styling and chassis upgrades.

=== Hybrid ===
The Elantra Hybrid can travel 54 mpg_{‑US} (4.4 L/100 km; 65 mpg_{‑imp}) with 139 hp (141 PS; 104 kW) and a 195 lb⋅ft (27 kg⋅m; 264 N⋅m) sent to the front wheels through a six-speed dual-clutch transmission. This engine consists of 1.6-litre, 34-kilowatt (46 hp; 46 PS) electric motor, and a 1.3-kilowatt-hour lithium-ion battery. The battery can store enough energy for gas free operation at a parking lot speed, and shuts off during coasting. The battery is located underneath the rear seats and the car has a steering ratio of 12.2:1.

=== Elantra N/Avante N/i30 Sedan N ===
In July 2021, the Elantra N, also known in some markets as the Avante N and the i30 Sedan N, was announced as the performance model of the Elantra under the Hyundai N sub-brand. The vehicle is powered by a 2.0-litre turbocharged I4 Theta II engine with a larger 52 mm turbine wheel rated at a maximum of 276 hp (280 PS; 206 kW) and 289 lb⋅ft (392 N⋅m; 40.0 kg⋅m) of torque. However, the engine is reportedly significantly underrated. It has reinforced strut mounts, increased body rigidity, stiffer sway bars, and has independent multi-link rear suspension instead of the Elantra's standard torsion beam rear suspension. The rear suspension has adjustable toe and camber. Brakes are swapped to higher performance versions, and tires are upgraded to wider and stickier 245/35/19 Michelin Pilot Sport 4S to offer increased performance compared to lower trims. The Elantra N has an electronic torque-vectoring limited-slip differential and a louder exhaust. Upgrades extend to the interior, with N Performance bucket seats as standard. In the United States and most markets the Elantra N is only offered as a fully loaded model, e.g. with upgraded audio as standard. It is available with either a six-speed manual transmission or an 8-speed wet-type DCT. For DCT models, N Grin Shift (NGS), N Power Shift (NPS) and N Track Sense Shift (NTS) are provided as standard features along with a power moonroof and keyless remote start. N-grin shift, only available on the DCT, allows the engine to be overboosted to 286 hp (290 PS; 213 kW) for 20 seconds. The curb weight is 3,186 pounds (1,445 kg). In Car and Driver testing, the 8-speed Elantra N can do 0–60 mph (0–97 km/h) in 4.8 seconds and the quarter mile in 13.4 seconds at a 106 mph (171 km/h) trap speed.

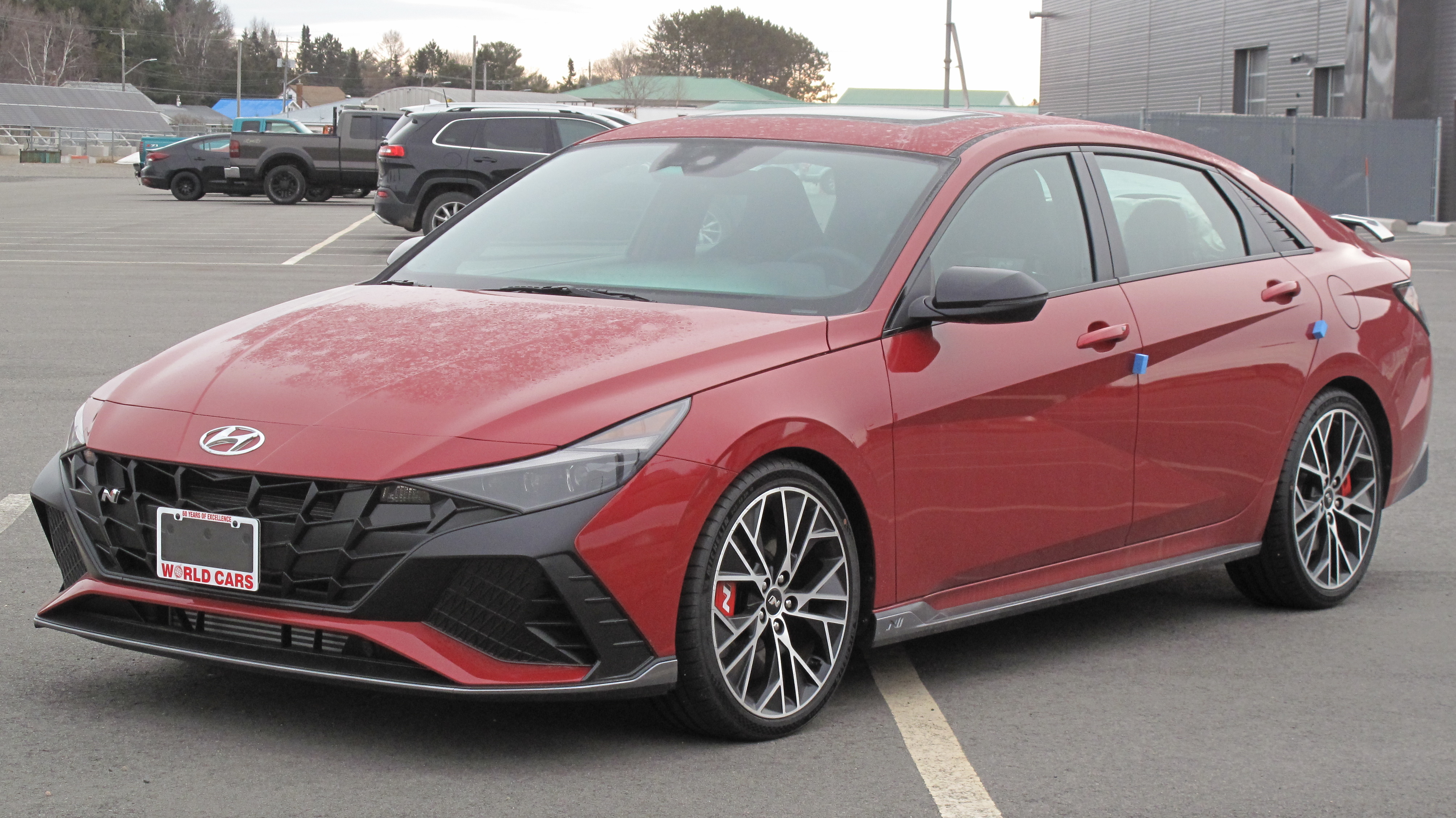
2022 Elantra N (pre-facelift)

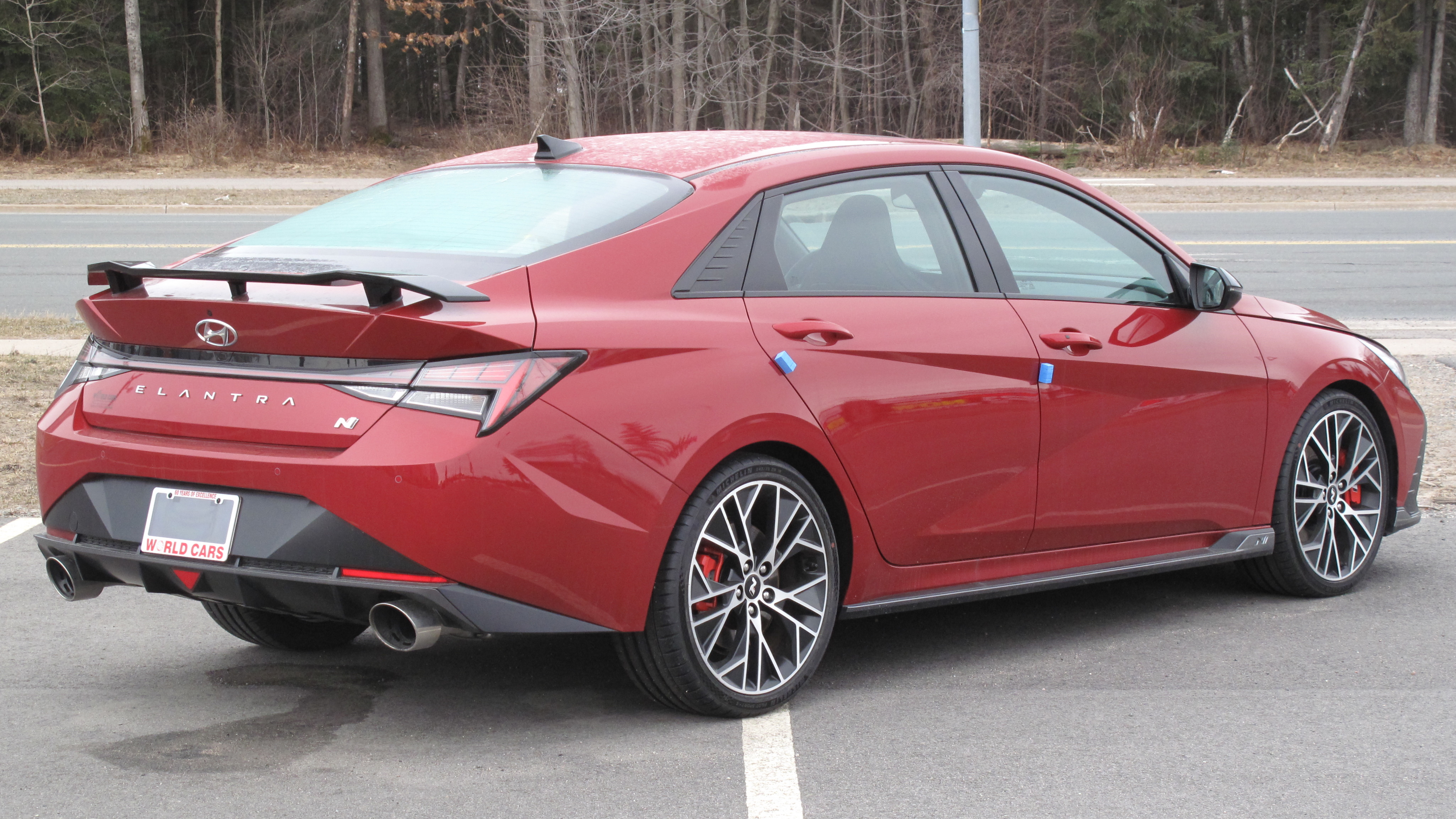
2022 Elantra N (pre-facelift)

=== Facelift ===
The facelifted Avante was revealed in South Korea on 27 February 2023. On April 18, 2023, Hyundai unveiled the facelifted Elantra N, which features a similar redesigned front and rear end to the standard Elantra.

The North American-market Elantra was introduced on August 30, 2023, along with the refreshed 2024 Hyundai Sonata. In North America, there will be three models available: petrol-only, petrol/electric hybrid, and performance-oriented N. The petrol lineup will feature a new SEL Convenience trim, while the petrol/electric hybrid model is now available in a single trim. Four new exterior paint colour options are available: Ecotronic Gray, Ultimate Red, Exotic Green (available on the N-line trim only), and Amazon Gray. Newly-standard safety features include rear side-impact airbags, a rear seatbelt reminder, and haptic feedback for the steering wheel that is integrated into the vehicle's safety systems. A new curved display screen, which consists of two separate screens under a single pane of glass, also becomes available.

In Singapore, the face-lifted model was launched in March 2024, in two models, the S and Elite models. Both models feature a 1.6-litre petrol-hybrid engine, with a 6-speed DCT transmission. The car also comes standard with a lithium-ion battery pack with 1.32 kilowatt-hours of capacity, with an electric motor. Both models are equipped with Hyundai's safety and technology features. These include a 10.25-inch digital cluster display and several Hyundai SmartSense driver-assistance systems such as Blind-spot Collision-Avoidance Assist, Forward Collision-Avoidance Assist, Lane Following Assist, Rear Cross-Traffic Collision Prevention Assist, and Safe Exit Warning. Furthermore, both models utilize a Regenerative Braking System to enhance efficiency. Additional features such as a sunroof and electric memory seat for the driver is sold only on the Elite model.

The Elantra N was also introduced to China at Auto Shanghai 2023 alongside the domestically produced Hyundai Mufasa as part of Hyundai's N performance brand in the Chinese market. The Elantra N was officially listed in November 2023 with trim levels: 2.0TN and 2.0T Sport Package Edition and are both equipped with the 8 speed dual clutch transmission. Available exterior colour choices are Performance Blue, Cyber Gray, Lightning White, and Phantom Black. While the Elantra has been assembled in the country traditionally since 2003, the Hyundai Elantra N is available instead as an imported model.

The facelifted Elantra N was launched in the Philippines on April 4, 2024, alongside the Ioniq 5 N, as part of Hyundai N's arrival in the country.

Hyundai Nishat commenced the production of the seventh-generation facelifted Elantra in Pakistan in October 2024. It comes in only one hybrid variant equipped with the 1.6 L Smartstream G1.6 Hybrid I4 hybrid powertrain paired with 6-speed DCT.

The Elantra N in facelift model has been launched in Brunei on 8 August 2025.

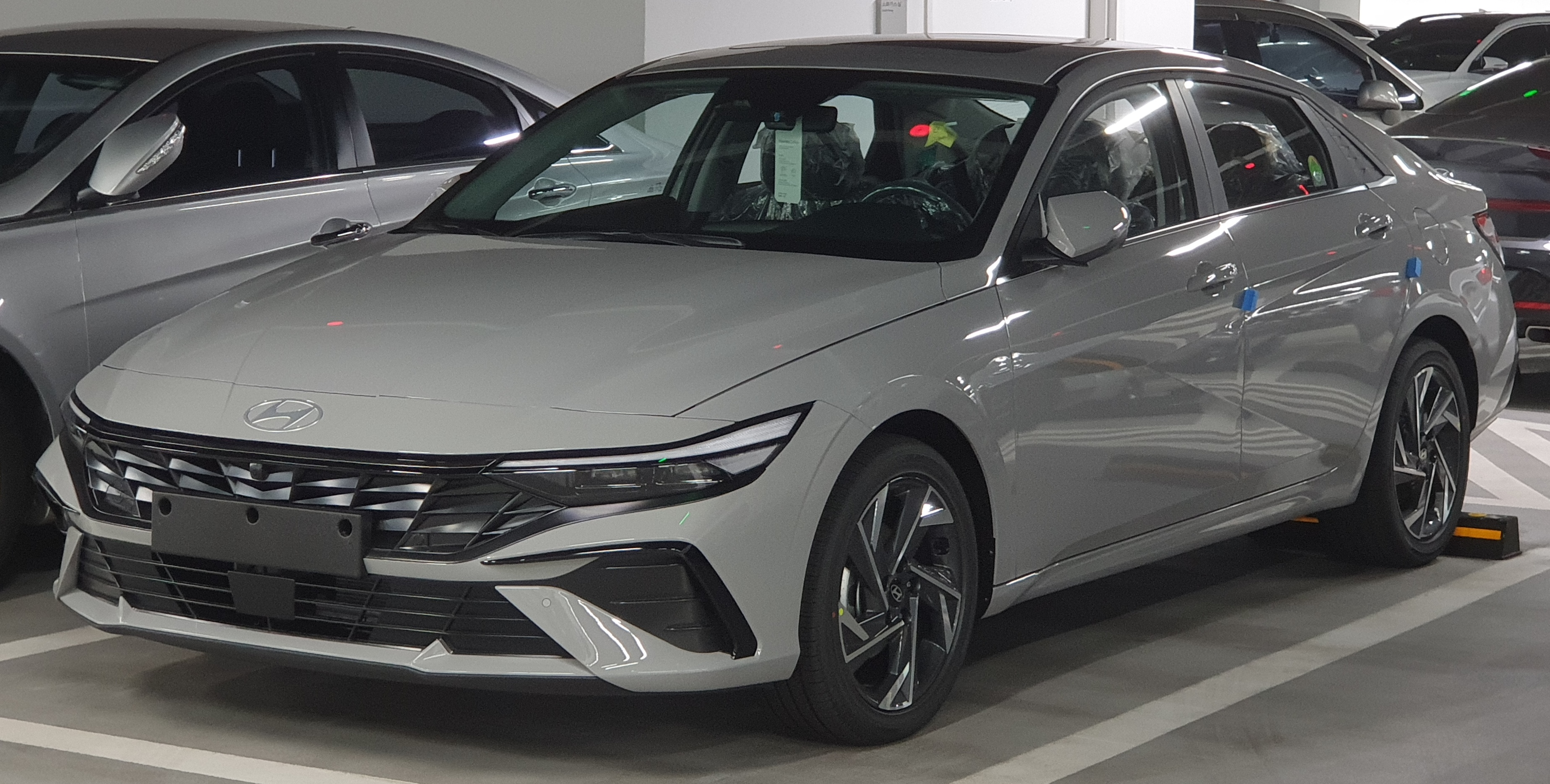
Facelift Avante (front)

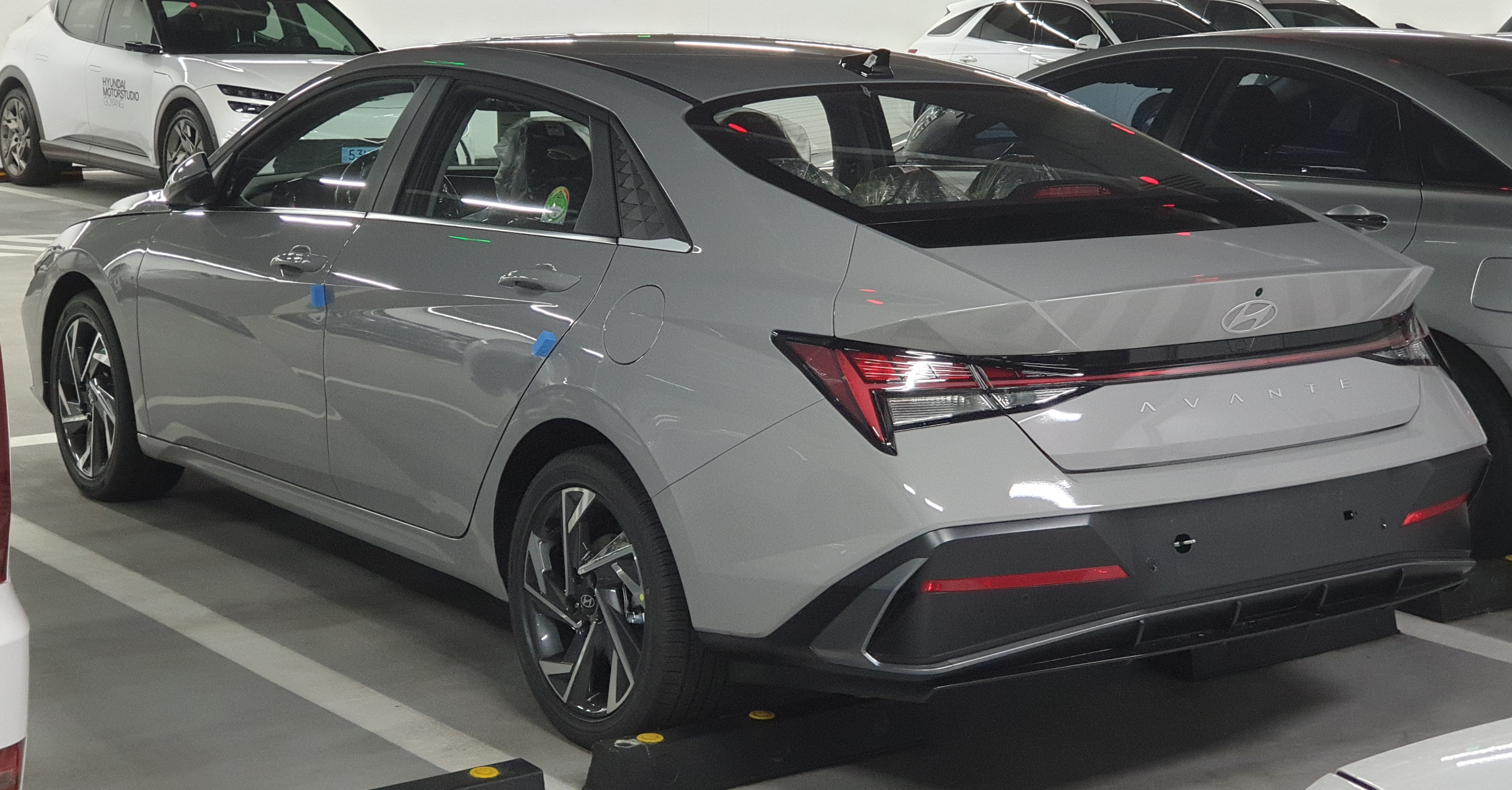
Facelift Avante (rear)

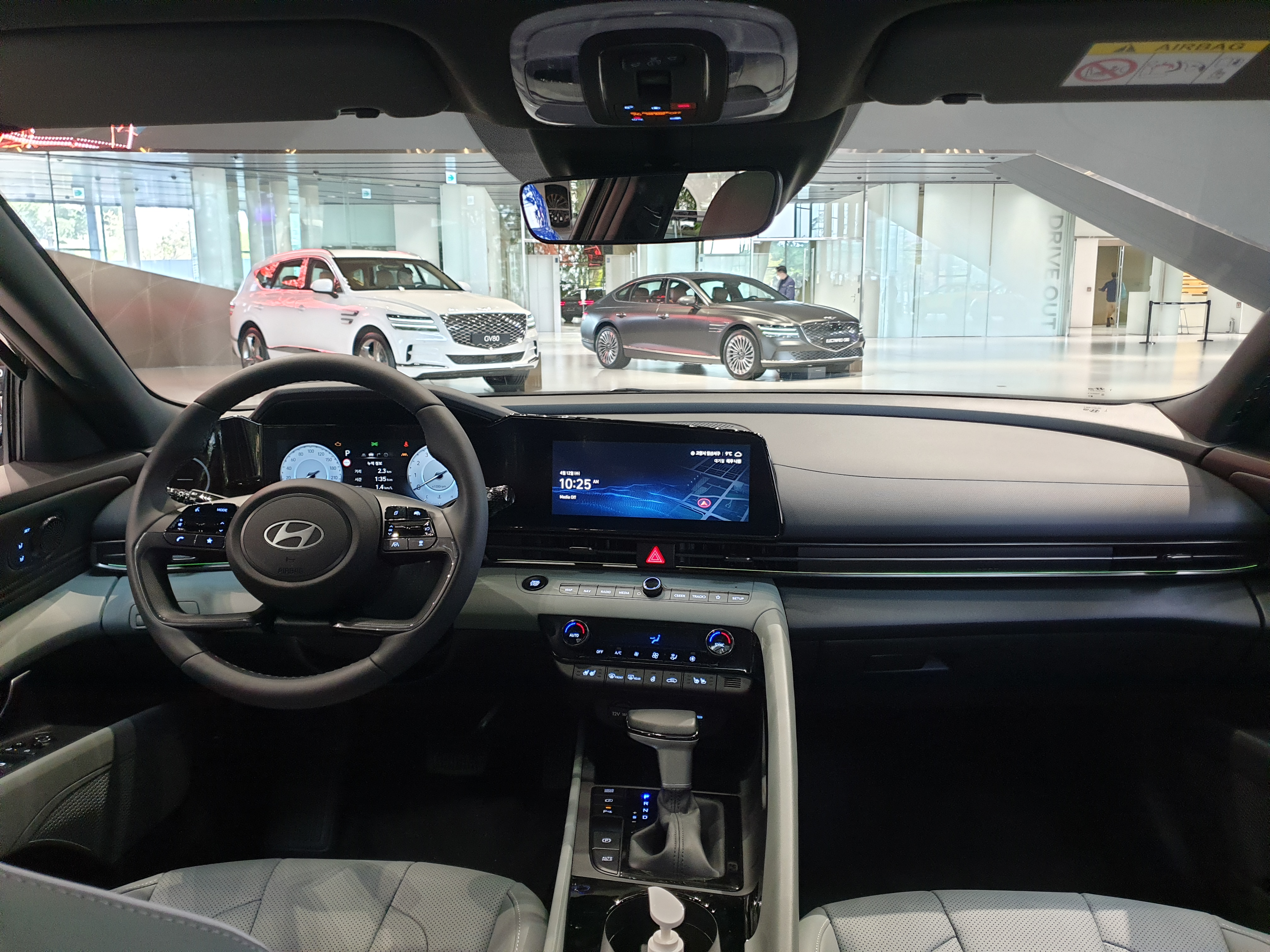
Facelift Avante (interior)

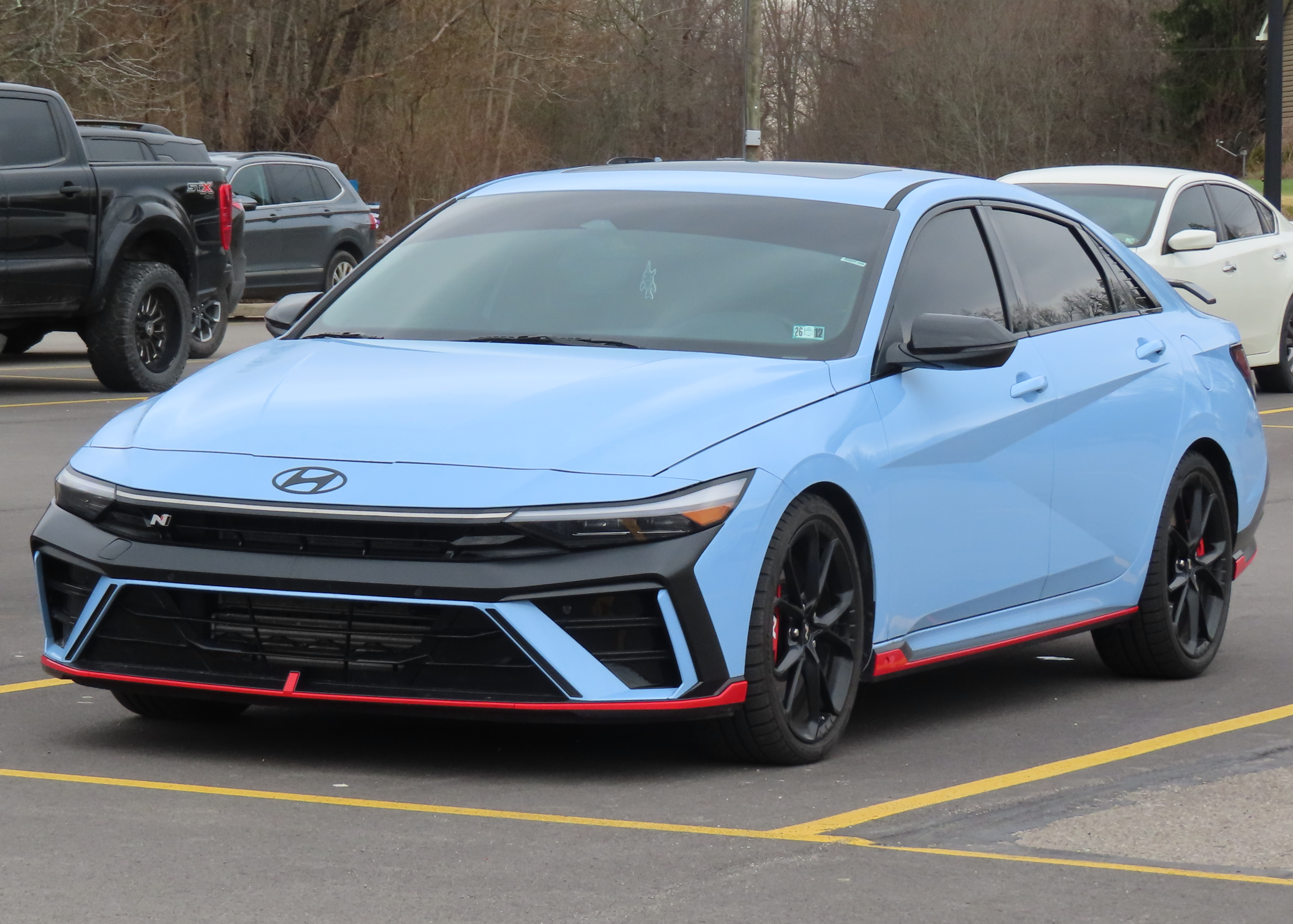
Facelift Avante N (front)

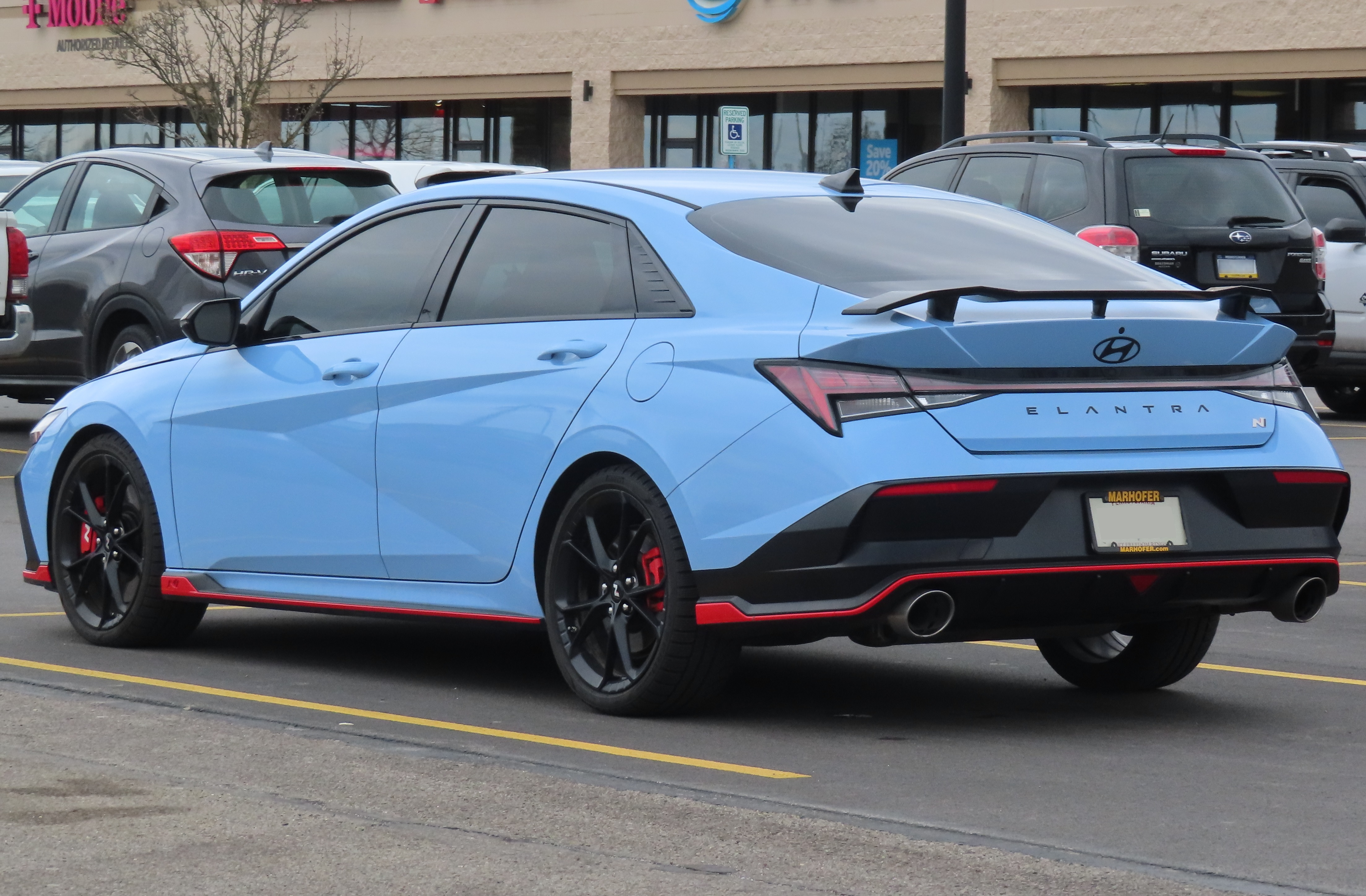
Facelift Avante N (rear)

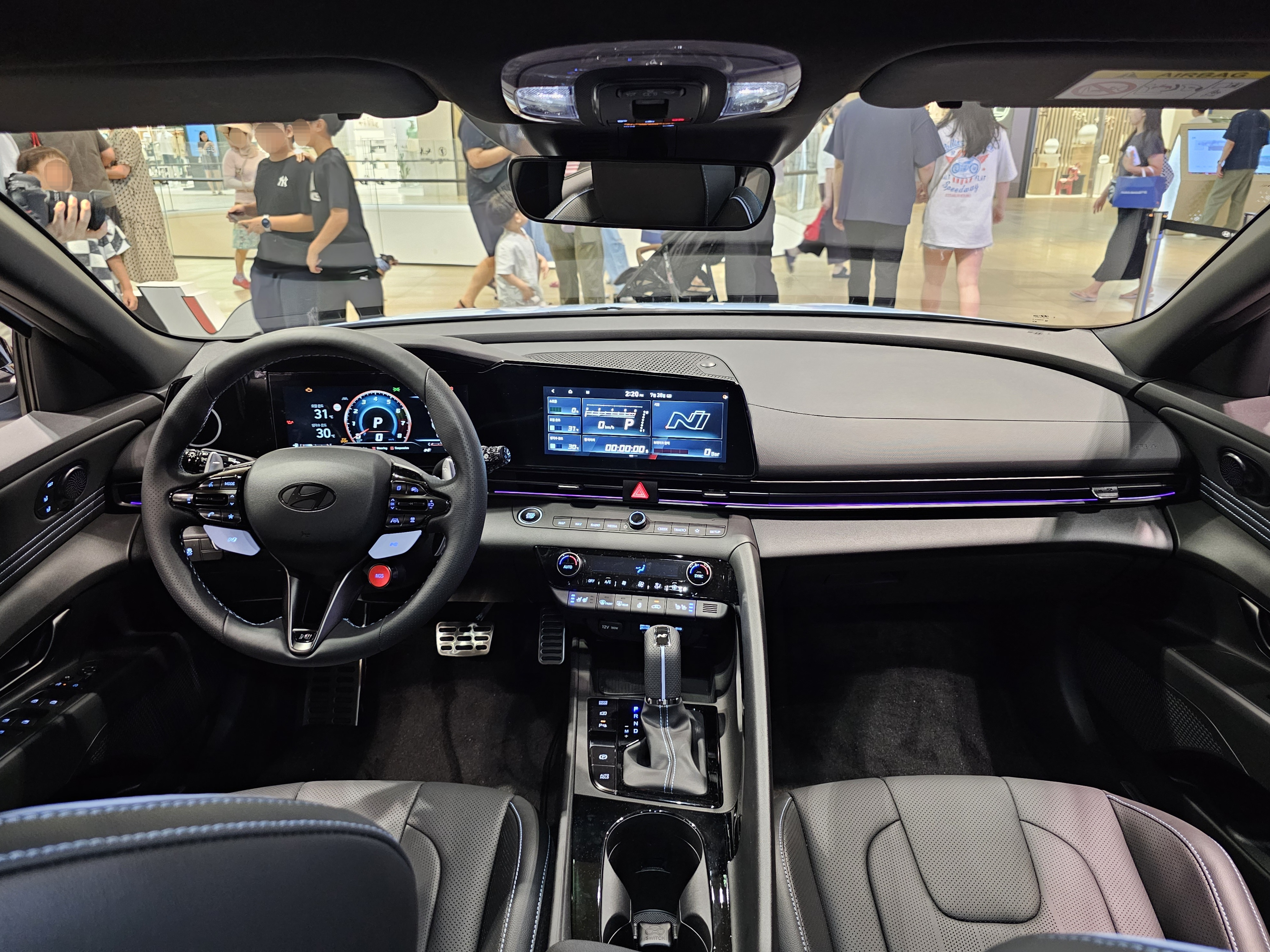
Facelift Avante N (interior)

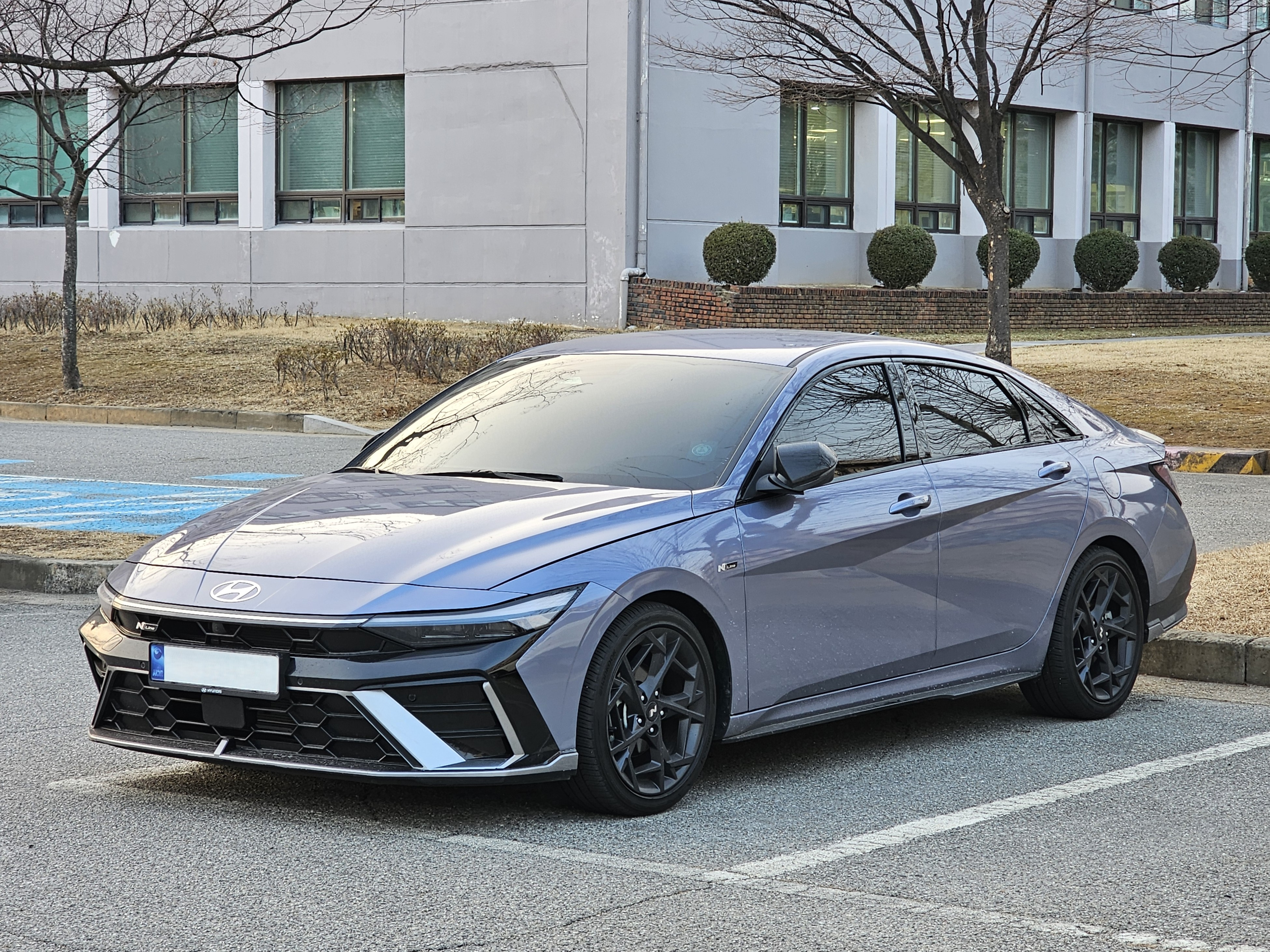
Facelift Avante N Line (front)

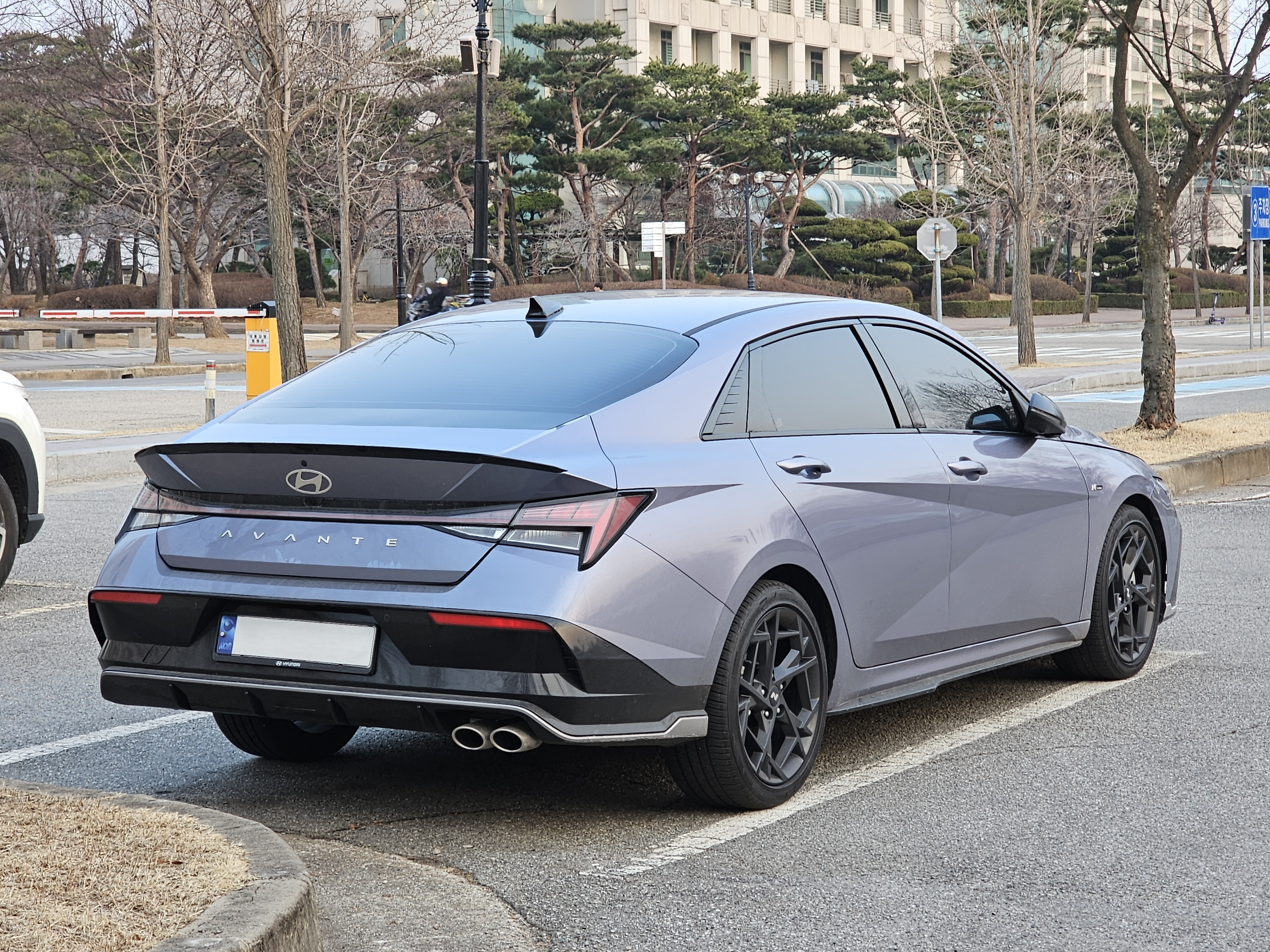
Facelift Avante N Line (rear)

=== Powertrain ===
Specs
petrol engines
Model	Engine	Transmissions	Power	Torque	0–100 km/h (0–62 mph) (official)	Top speed
Smartstream G1.4 T-GDi	1,353 cc (82.6 cu in) I4	7-speed DCT	140 PS (103 kW; 138 hp) @ 6,000 rpm	21.5 kg⋅m (211 N⋅m; 156 lb⋅ft) @ 1,400–3,700 rpm		200 km/h (124 mph)
Smartstream G1.5 MPI	1,497 cc (91.4 cu in) I4	CVT	115 PS (85 kW; 113 hp) @ 6,300 rpm	14.7 kg⋅m (144 N⋅m; 106 lb⋅ft) @ 4,500 rpm		190 km/h (118 mph)
Gamma 1.6 MPI	1,591 cc (97.1 cu in) I4	6-speed manual	127.5 PS (94 kW; 126 hp) @ 6,300 rpm	15.77 kg⋅m (155 N⋅m; 114 lb⋅ft) @ 4,850 rpm		195 km/h (121 mph)
Gamma 1.6 MPI	1,591 cc (97.1 cu in) I4	6-speed automatic	127.5 PS (94 kW; 126 hp) @ 6,300 rpm	15.77 kg⋅m (155 N⋅m; 114 lb⋅ft) @ 4,850 rpm	11.3s	195 km/h (121 mph)
Smartstream G1.6 MPI	1,598 cc (97.5 cu in) I4	6-speed manual	123 PS (90 kW; 121 hp) @ 6,300 rpm	15.7 kg⋅m (154 N⋅m; 114 lb⋅ft) @ 4,550 rpm	10.6s	197 km/h (122 mph)
Smartstream G1.6 MPI	1,598 cc (97.5 cu in) I4	CVT	123 PS (90 kW; 121 hp) @ 6,300 rpm	15.7 kg⋅m (154 N⋅m; 114 lb⋅ft) @ 4,550 rpm	10.7s	195 km/h (121 mph)
Smartstream G1.6 T-GDi	1,598 cc (97.5 cu in) turbocharged I4	6-speed manual	204 PS (150 kW; 201 hp) @ 6,000 rpm	27 kg⋅m (265 N⋅m; 195 lb⋅ft) @ 1,500–4,500 rpm	7.9s	225 km/h (140 mph)
Smartstream G1.6 T-GDi	1,598 cc (97.5 cu in) turbocharged I4	7-speed DCT	204 PS (150 kW; 201 hp) @ 6,000 rpm	27 kg⋅m (265 N⋅m; 195 lb⋅ft) @ 1,500–4,500 rpm	7.6s	225 km/h (140 mph)
Smartstream G2.0 MPI	1,999 cc (122.0 cu in) I4	CVT	149 PS (110 kW; 147 hp) @ 6,200 rpm	18.3 kg⋅m (179 N⋅m; 132 lb⋅ft) @ 4,500 rpm		
Smartstream G2.0 MPI	1,999 cc (122.0 cu in) I4	6-speed manual	159 PS (117 kW; 157 hp) @ 6,200 rpm	19.5 kg⋅m (191 N⋅m; 141 lb⋅ft) @ 4,500 rpm		203 km/h (126 mph)
Smartstream G2.0 MPI	1,999 cc (122.0 cu in) I4	6-speed automatic	159 PS (117 kW; 157 hp) @ 6,200 rpm	19.5 kg⋅m (191 N⋅m; 141 lb⋅ft) @ 4,500 rpm	9.8s	203 km/h (126 mph)
Theta II 2.0 T-GDI	1,998 cc (121.9 cu in) turbocharged I4	6-speed manual	280 PS (206 kW; 276 hp) @ 5,500–6,000 rpm	40 kg⋅m (392 N⋅m; 289 lb⋅ft) @ 2,100–4,700 rpm	5.8s	250 km/h (155 mph)
Theta II 2.0 T-GDI	1,998 cc (121.9 cu in) turbocharged I4	8-speed DCT	280 PS (206 kW; 276 hp) @ 5,500–6,000 rpm	40 kg⋅m (392 N⋅m; 289 lb⋅ft) @ 2,100–4,700 rpm	5.3s	250 km/h (155 mph)
LPG engine
Model	Engine	Transmissions	Power	Torque	0–100 km/h (0–62 mph) (official)	Top speed
Gamma 1.6 LPi	1,591 cc (97.1 cu in) I4	6-speed automatic	120 PS (88 kW; 118 hp) @ 6,000 rpm	15.5 kg⋅m (152 N⋅m; 112 lbf⋅ft) @ 4,500 rpm		
Hybrid engine
Model	Engine	Transmissions	Power	Torque	0–100 km/h (0–62 mph) (official)	Top speed
Smartstream G1.6 Hybrid	1,580 cc (96 cu in) I4	6-speed DCT	141 PS (104 kW; 139 hp) @ 5,700 rpm	27 kg⋅m (265 N⋅m; 195 lb⋅ft)	10.5s	178 km/h (111 mph)

=== Safety ===
The 2026 Hyundai Elantra was named an IIHS Top Safety Pick. It received Good ratings in small overlap front, updated moderate overlap front, updated side, headlights and pedestrian front crash prevention evaluations, while seat belt reminders and LATCH ease of use were rated Acceptable.

IIHS Hyundai Elantra scores:
Small overlap front	Good
Moderate overlap front: updated test	Good
Side: updated test	Good
Headlights	Good
Front crash prevention: pedestrian	Good
Seat belt reminders	Acceptable
LATCH ease of use	Acceptable

ANCAP test results Hyundai i30 Sedan petrol & hybrid Sedan variants excluding i30 Sedan N (2024, aligned with Euro NCAP)
Test	Points	%
Overall:	3 /5 stars	
Adult occupant:	28.42	71%
Child occupant:	39.87	81%
Pedestrian:	39.22	62%
Safety assist:	10.16	56%

== Eighth generation (CN8; 2026) ==
Eighth generation
- 2026 Hyundai Avante Inspiration (South Korea)

Overview
- Model code: CN8
- Also called: Hyundai Avante (South Korea)
- Production: 2026–present
- Model years: 2027
- Assembly: South Korea: Ulsan (Ulsan Plant 3); China: Beijing (Beijing Hyundai)

Body and chassis
- Body style: 4-door sedan
- Platform: Hyundai-Kia K3

Powertrain
- Engine: Petrol: 2.0 L Smartstream G2.0 MPi I4; Petrol hybrid: 1.6 L Smartstream G1.6 Hybrid I4
- Power output: 109.7 kW (147 hp; 149 PS) (petrol); 115.6 kW (155 hp; 157 PS) (petrol hybrid)
- Hybrid drivetrain: Parallel hybrid (Elantra Hybrid)

Dimensions
- Wheelbase: 2,750 mm (108.3 in)
- Length: 4,765 mm (187.6 in)
- Width: 1,855 mm (73.0 in)
- Height: 1,425 mm (56.1 in)

The eighth-generation Elantra (Korean: Avante; codename CN8) was unveiled on 26 June 2026 during the press day of the Busan International Mobility Show in Busan, South Korea.

Compared with its predecessor, the model features a larger body, a redesigned interior incorporating Hyundai's Pleos Connect infotainment system, and revised powertrains. At launch, Hyundai announced naturally aspirated petrol and hybrid variants. The petrol model is powered by an updated 2.0-litre engine, while the hybrid model uses an updated 1.6-litre petrol-electric powertrain with increased output and improved fuel efficiency.

Sales of the Avante in South Korea began in August 2026, with export markets, including the Elantra, scheduled to follow during 2027.

The Elantra made its U.S debut at the Los Angeles Auto Show on November 19, 2026.

Rear view

Interior

== Other versions ==
=== Elantra Touring ===
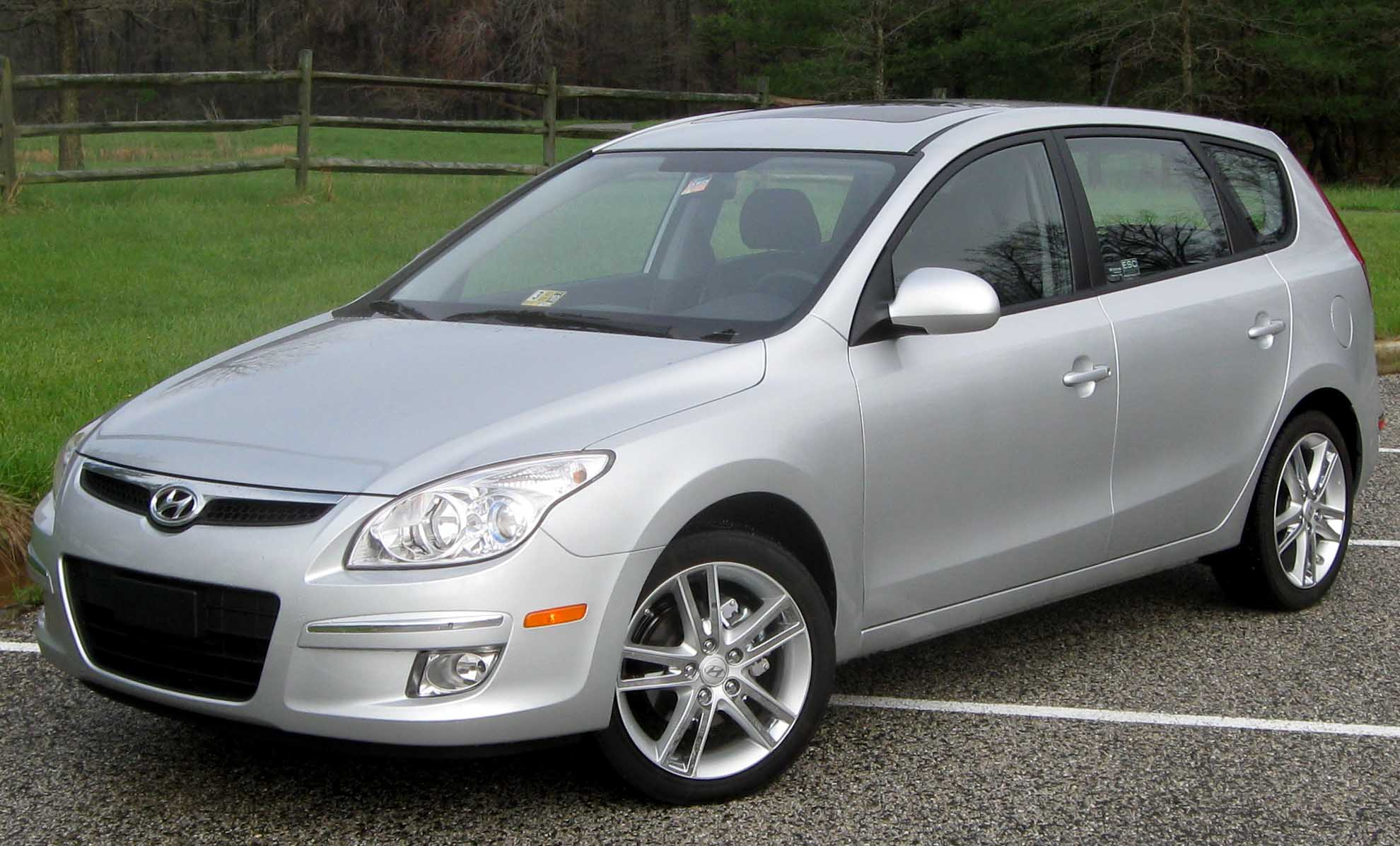
2009 Elantra Touring (US)

The first-generation Hyundai i30cw station wagon was marketed in the United States and Canada as the Hyundai Elantra Touring since the 2009 model year until 2012.

=== Elantra GT ===
The second-generation i30 hatchback was released in the United States and Canada in 2012 as the Hyundai Elantra GT. The nameplate usage continues for the third-generation i30, which was released in 2017 for the 2018 model year. The Elantra GT was discontinued in these markets in 2020 due to the expansion of Hyundai's SUV line-up.

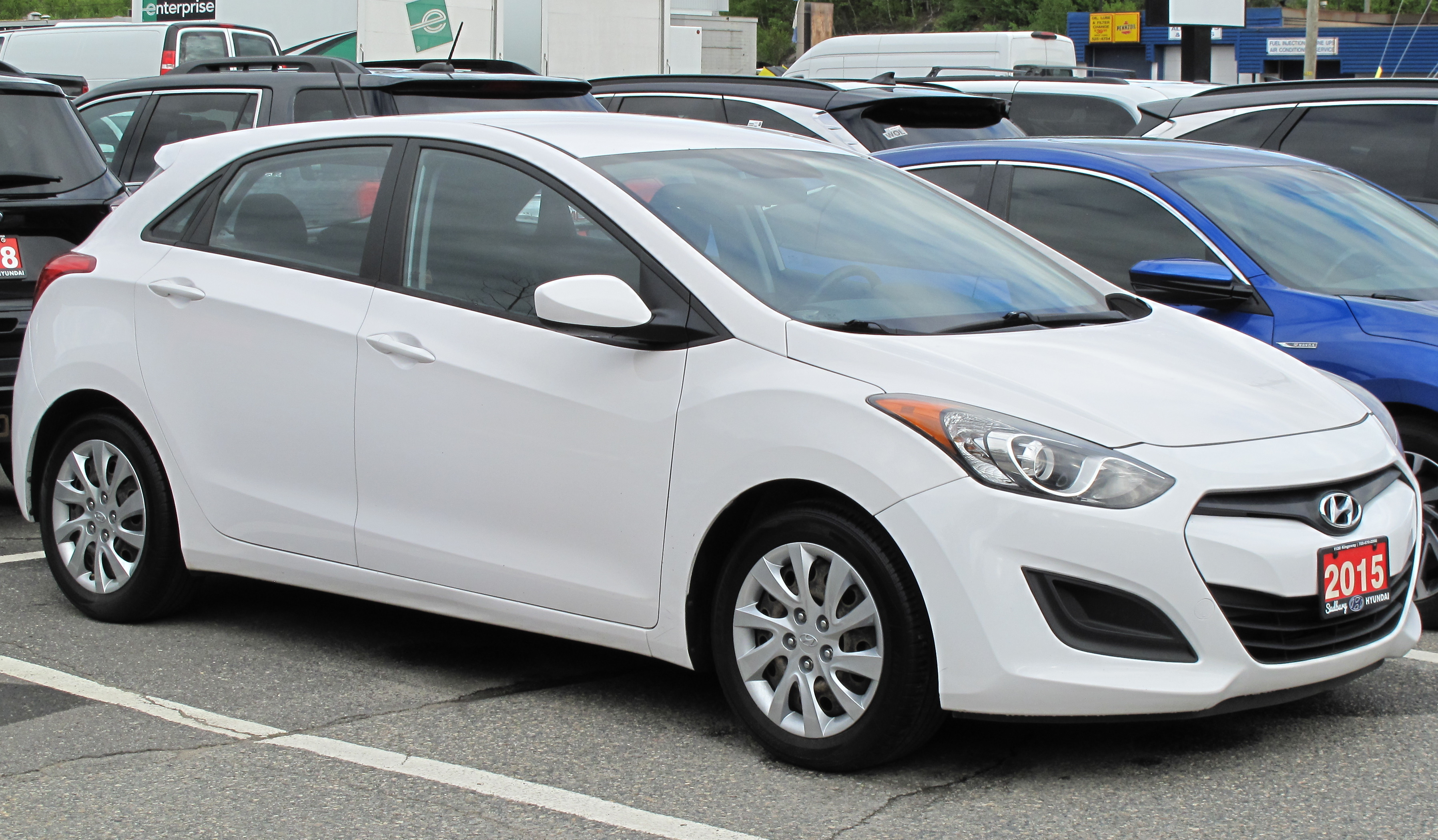
2015 Hyundai Elantra GT (Canada)

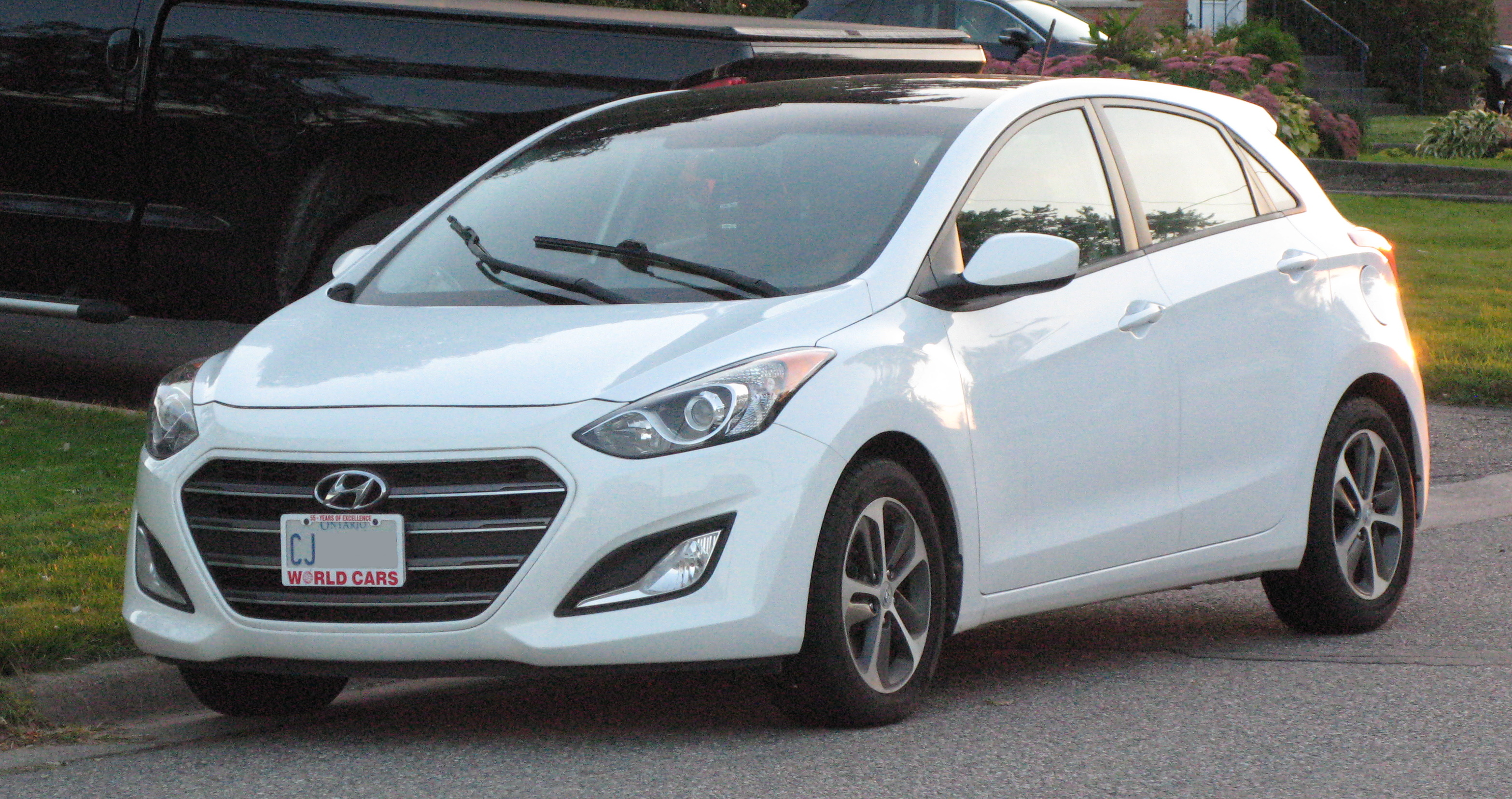
2017 Hyundai Elantra GT (Canada)

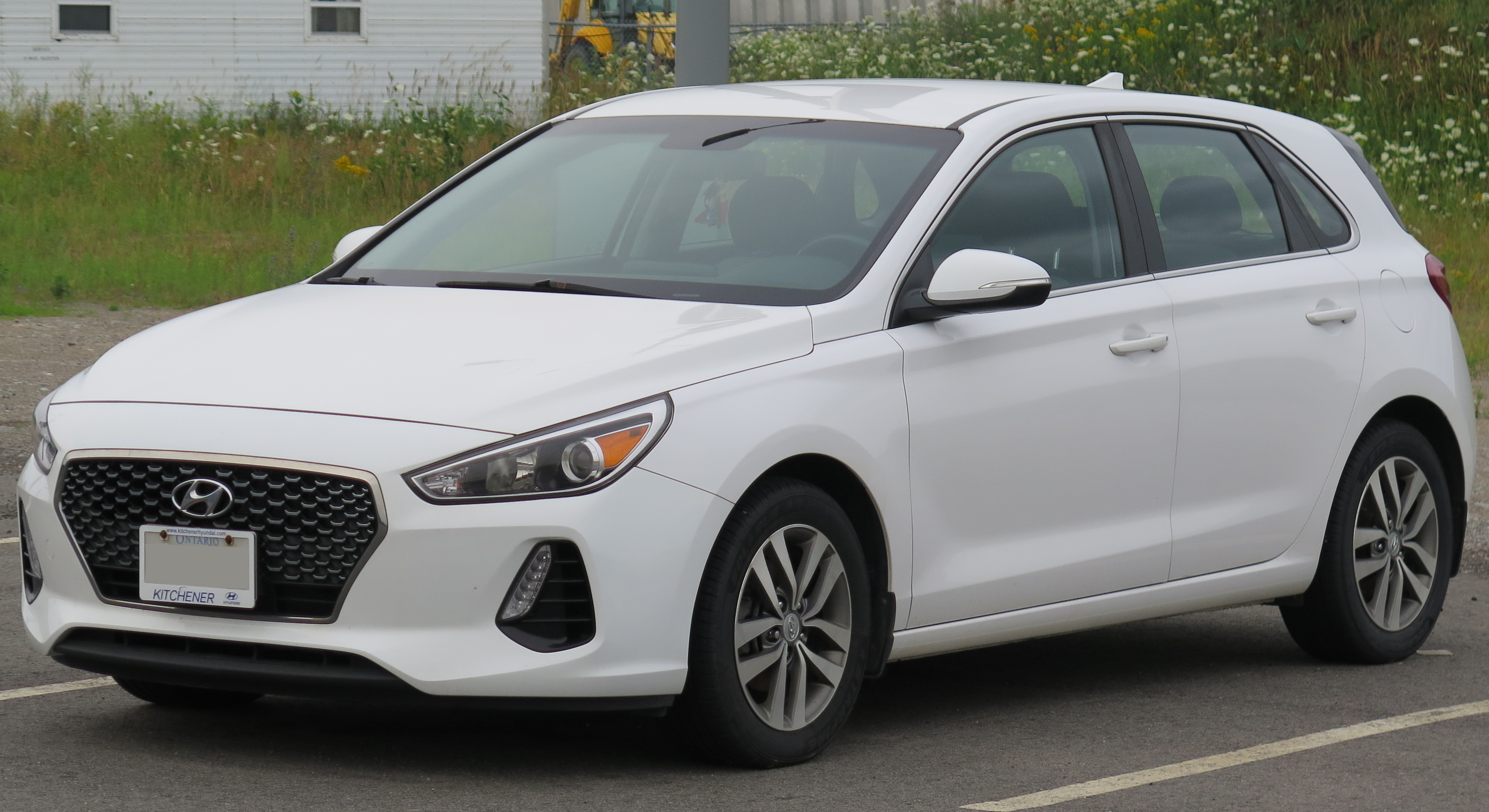
2018 Hyundai Elantra GT (Canada)

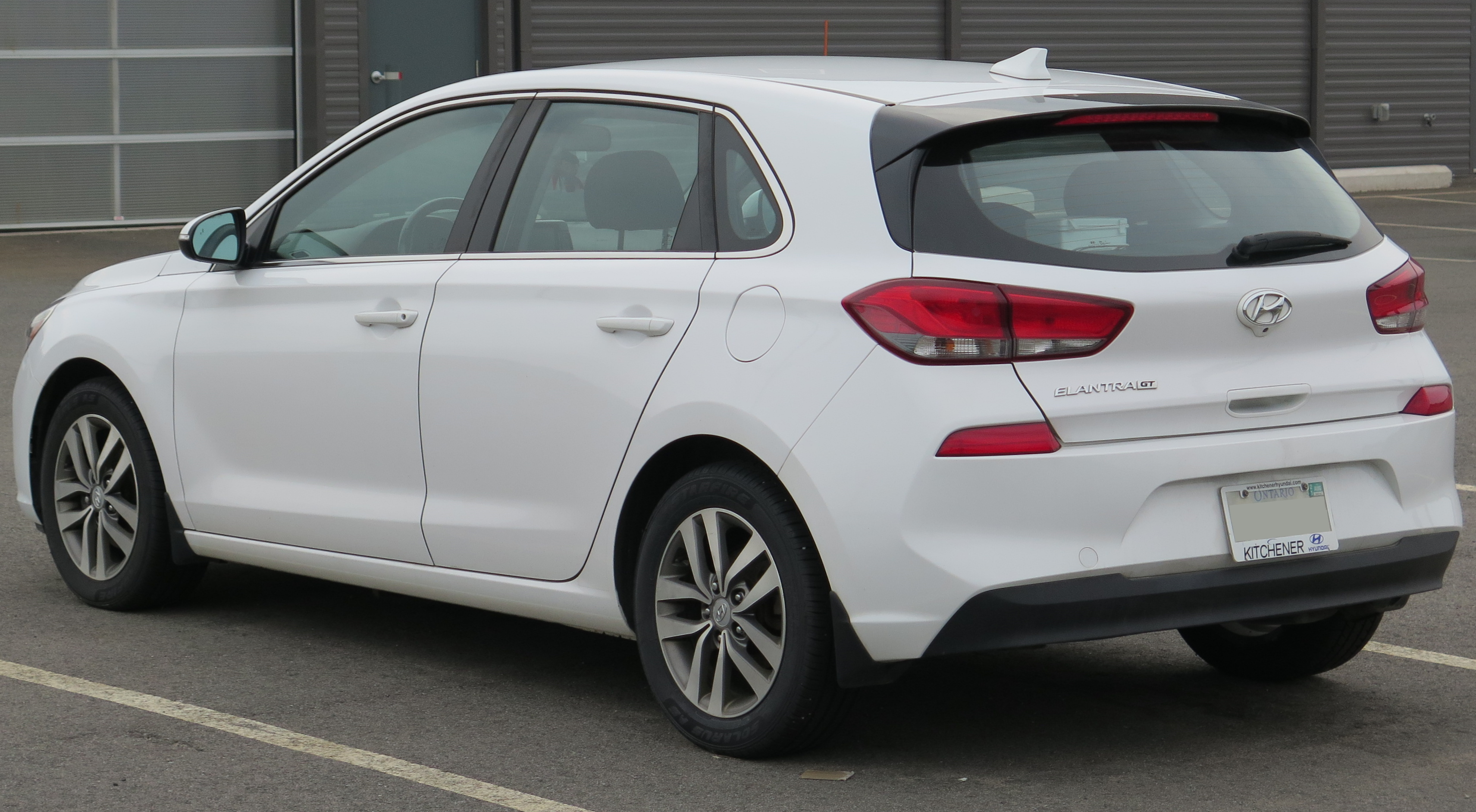
2018 Hyundai Elantra GT (Canada)

== Motorsport ==
=== Elantra N1 Cup ===
Also called the Avante N1 Cup in South Korea, the N1 Cup is an improved Elantra N model for Hyundai's one-make series, Hyundai N Festival. The N1 Cup features 35 more hp, a wider body kit, six piston front brake calipers, one-way adjustable suspension and a swan-neck style rear wing spoiler compared to the Elantra N version. The car also competes in China in the Hyundai N Cup.

=== Elantra N1 TC Evo ===
Debuting in the 2025 TC America Series season, the N1 TC Evo is an upgrade to the N1 Cup Car used in South Korea and China. Improvements include wider fenders and 18x10-inch wheels and other enhancements to meet SRO TC Series homologation. Drivers are also eligible for Hyundai N Trophy Cup at seven rounds of the TC America Series where entrants using the N1 TC Evo compete against one another with monetary rewards for championship performance.

== Sales ==
Year	South Korea	U.S.	Canada	Mexico	China	Europe
1990						
1991						
1992						
1993						
1994						
1995						
1996						
1997						3,188
1998						3,249
1999						2,910
2000						4,641
2001						18,324
2002		120,638				15,120
2003		120,858			178	9,223
2004		112,892	15,375		102,748	14,385
2005		116,336	16,101		176,589	10,815
2006		98,853	12,228		169,716	3,990
2007		85,724	14,327		120,333	
2008		94,720	11,814		203,735	
2009		103,269	30,675		411,054	
2010		132,246	34,556		304,363	
2011		186,361	44,970		385,985	1,628
2012		202,034	50,950		294,434	2,793
2013		247,912	54,760		377,895	1,460
2014		222,023	50,420	3,258	384,702	1,375
2015	99,912	241,706	47,722	5,074	309,894	1,507
2016	93,749	208,319	48,875	3,275	407,106	2,173
2017	83,830	198,210	46,112	4,819	257,572	2,485
2018	75,831	200,415	41,784	3,946	225,697	1,942
2019	62,104	175,094	39,463	3,003	127,779	1,779
2020	87,731	105,475	25,006	1,330	100,530	1,003
2021	71,036	124,422	26,312	1,267	131,756	1,913
2022	58,743	117,177	24,559	1,176	99,856	1,082
2023	65,364	134,149	20,459	1,237	108,673	1,390
2024	56,890	136,698	20,427	707	77,479	1,077
2025		148,200	24,248		56,854	

== See also ==
- List of Hyundai vehicles

== Naming disputes ==
Mitsubishi Motors Australia complained that the Hyundai Elantra was too close to the Elante trim level, which was last used on the 1991 Magna. British Lotus Cars and South Korean Kia Motors said that the Elantra name was too close to the Lotus Elan and its Kia counterpart. Germany's Audi, meanwhile, complained that "Avante" was too close to Avant (used for Audi station wagons/estates). In 2001, both the Elan and the Elante had ceased production but the Avante's renaming remained necessary as Audi owned the Avant name in Europe and continued to produce it. Because of these naming problems, the Elantra received "Lantra" badges in many markets (until 2001) while "Avante" has mainly been used in the South Korean domestic market.
