= Hyundai Alpha engine =

Hyundai Alpha α-series

Overview
- Manufacturer: Hyundai Motors
- Production: 1992–2011

Layout
- Configuration: Inline-4
- Displacement: 1.3 L (1,341 cc); 1.4 L (1,399 cc); 1.5 L (1,495 cc); 1.6 L (1,599 cc)
- Cylinder bore: 71.5 mm (1.3L); 75.5 mm (1.4/1.5L); 76.5mm (1.6L)
- Piston stroke: 78.1 mm (1.4L); 83.5 mm (1.3/1.5L); 87 mm (1.6L)
- Cylinder block material: Cast Iron
- Cylinder head material: Aluminum alloy
- Valvetrain: SOHC; DOHC
- Compression ratio: 7.5:1–10.0:1

RPM range
- Idle speed: 700-800 ± 100 RPM

Combustion
- Fuel system: Carbureted; Electronic Fuel Injection
- Fuel type: Gasoline
- Oil system: Wet sump
- Cooling system: Liquid-cooled

Output
- Power output: 72–129 PS (53–95 kW; 71–127 hp)
- Torque output: 11.2–18.3 kg⋅m (81–132 lb⋅ft; 110–179 N⋅m)

Chronology
- Successor: Gamma

The Hyundai Alpha series is a multi-valve gasoline inline four-cylinder engine family comprising 1.3, 1.4, 1.5, and 1.6 L naturally aspirated versions and a 1.5 L turbocharged version. Introduced in 1992, this was Hyundai's first engine designed entirely in-house and was the first indigenous South Korean engine design. Design objectives were to provide high performance and good fuel economy with excellent durability at a reasonable cost.

The first Alpha series engine marketed was the 1.5L SOHC 12-valve inline-four. It was offered in naturally aspirated and turbo versions and debuted in the 1992 Hyundai Scoupe. A 1.3L version debuted later in the Hyundai Accent.

A dual overhead camshaft (DOHC), four valve per cylinder version debuted in the 1996 Hyundai Accent GT.

A strengthened block, an eight-counterweight crankshaft, and hydraulic engine mounts were added from 2000-onward to reduce NVH (noise, vibration and harshness).

The 1.6L Alpha II debuted in 2001, eventually replacing the 1.3L and 1.5L. It was further revised in 2005 with a 1.4L version also debuting. Notable improvements over the Alpha included a DOHC 16-valve cylinder head, graphite-coated piston skirts, a strengthened cylinder block, ribbed aluminum oil pan, coil-on-plug ignition, an enlarged throttle body (increased from 48 mm to 52 mm), a revised PCM (powertrain control module), simplified and shortened intake ducting, a revised intake manifold, and a returnless fuel system. These improvements further reduced NVH and emissions, with the 1.6L version becoming ULEV-certified in all 50 U.S. states.

== Alpha ==
=== 1.3L CON (G4EA) ===
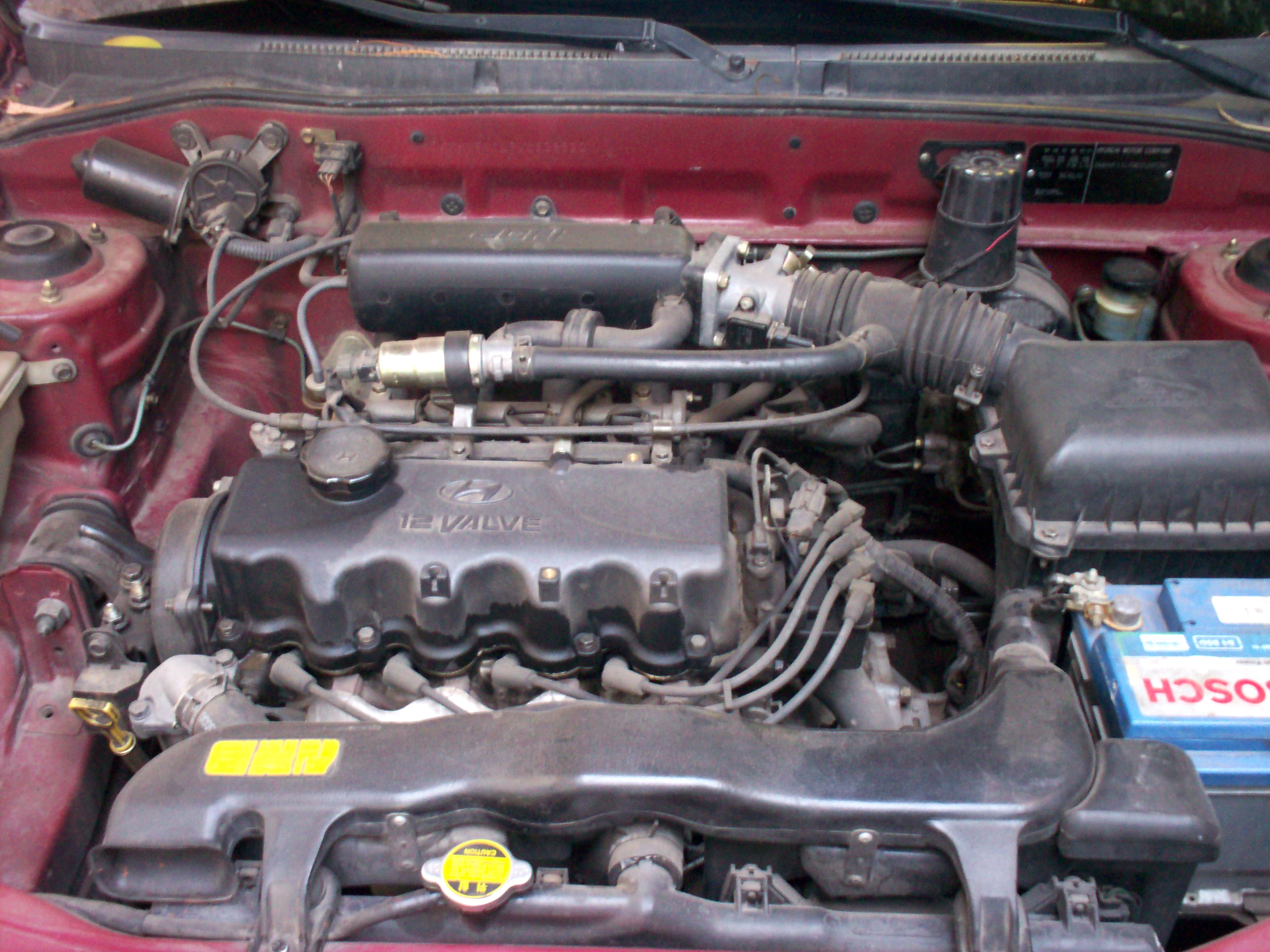
G4EH in a 1999 Hyundai Accent L

The G4EA is a carbureted SOHC 12-valve engine with a bore and stroke of 71.5 mm and 83.5 mm respectively. Output is 72 PS (53 kW; 71 hp) at 5,500 rpm and 11.2 kg⋅m (110 N⋅m; 81 lb⋅ft) at 3,000 rpm. The 1.3 L engine was not sold in North America.

Applications

- 1994–2000 Hyundai Accent (X3)

=== 1.3L EFI (G4EH) ===
The G4EH is a fuel injected version of the Alpha G4EA. Output is 85 PS (63 kW; 84 hp) at 5,500 rpm and 12 kg⋅m (118 N⋅m; 87 lb⋅ft) at 3,000 rpm. The 1.3 L EFI engine was not sold in North America.

Applications

- 1994–2005 Hyundai Accent (X3/LC)
- 1996–1999 Tatra Beta
- 2002–2005 Hyundai Getz

=== 1.5L (G4EB/G4EK) ===
The G4EB/G4EK is a fuel injected SOHC 12-valve engine. Output is 88 PS (65 kW; 87 hp) with 13.5 kg⋅m (132 N⋅m; 98 lb⋅ft) of torque for the European market and 93 PS (68 kW; 92 hp) with 13.5 kg⋅m (132 N⋅m; 98 lb⋅ft) of torque for the North American market.

Applications

- 1994-1997 Hyundai Excel
- 1992–1996 Hyundai Scoupe
- 1994–2005 Hyundai Accent (X3/LC)
- 1995–1998 Hyundai Elantra (J2)

=== 1.5L (G4EC/G4FK) ===
The G4EC/G4FK is an upgraded version of the Alpha G4EK with the addition of a DOHC cylinder head and 16 valves. Power output is 102 PS (75 kW; 101 hp) at 5,800 rpm and 13.6 kg⋅m (133 N⋅m; 98 lb⋅ft) at 3,000 rpm and was later increased to 107 PS (79 kW; 106 hp) at 6,000 rpm and 13.8 kg⋅m (135 N⋅m; 100 lb⋅ft) at 4,500 rpm.

Applications

- 1998-1999 Hyundai Excel (G4FK)
- 2000 Hyundai Excel (G4EC)
- 1999–2005 Hyundai Accent (LC)(G4EC - G4ED)
- 1995–1998 Hyundai Elantra (J2)
- 2000–2006 Hyundai Elantra (XD)
- 2003–2006 Kia Cerato (LD)
- 2002–2005 Hyundai Getz (LD)

=== 1.5L Turbo (G4EK Turbo) ===
The engine makes 115–129 PS (85–95 kW; 113–127 hp) at 5,500 rpm and 17–18.3 kg⋅m (167–179 N⋅m; 123–132 lb⋅ft) of torque at 4,500 rpm depending on market.

Applications

- 1992–1996 Hyundai Scoupe

== Alpha II ==
=== 1.4L (G4EE) ===
The DOHC 1.4 L (1399 cc) G4EE Alpha II debuted in the 2005 European Kia Rio JB, but wasn't available in North America. It utilized the 75.5 mm bore of the original 1.5 L engine, but was destroked to 78.1 mm. Other design improvements of the 1.6 L G4ED carried over to the 1.4 L G4EE, except for CVVT. The engine was noted for its smoother, freer revving nature as compared to the larger 1.6 L due to its squarer bore:stroke dimensions. It also produced slightly improved fuel consumption at the expense of overall power output.

Power output is rated 95 PS (70 kW; 94 hp) at 6,000 rpm and 12.7 kg⋅m (125 N⋅m; 92 lb⋅ft) at 4,700 rpm.

Applications

- 2005–2010 Hyundai Accent (MC)
- 2005–2011 Hyundai Getz
- 2005–2011 Kia Rio (JB)

=== 1.6L (G4ED) ===
The Hyundai Alpha-II G4ED is an in-line 4, spark-ignition 4-stroke, dual overhead camshaft (DOHC) with 16 valves. The engine's advertised power is Output is 105–112 PS (77–82 kW; 104–110 hp) at 6,000 rpm and 14.6–14.9 kg⋅m (143–146 N⋅m; 106–108 lb⋅ft) at 4,500 rpm.

Post 2005 models feature Hyundai's variable valve timing technology (CVVT)

Specification:
Bore: 76.5 mm (3.01 in)
Stroke: 87 mm (3.43 in)
Total displacement: 1,599 cc (97.6 cu in)
Compression Ratio: 10.0:1
Firing Order: 1-3-4-2
Idle RPM: 750± 100
Ignition Timing at idle speed: BTDC 9° ± 5°/800 rpm
Size (L x W x H): 465mm x 572mm x 654mm
Weight (dry): 118.2 kg (260.6 lb)
Alternator: 13.5V/90A
Starter motor: 12V/0.9KW

Applications

- 2005–2011 Kia Rio (JB)
- 2000–2001 Hyundai Coupe (RD)
- 2000–2006 Hyundai Elantra (XD)
- 2001–2008 Hyundai Coupe (GK)
- 2001–2010 Hyundai Accent (LC/MC)
- 2003–2006 Kia Cerato (LD)
- 2002–2010 Hyundai Matrix (FC)
- 2003–2006 Kia Qianlima
- 2005–2011 Hyundai Getz
- 2008–2020 Hyundai Elantra Yuedong (Chinese market only)

== See also ==
- List of Hyundai engines
