= Hyundai Sirius engine =

Sirius engine

Overview
- Manufacturer: Hyundai Motor Company

Layout
- Configuration: Straight-4
- Displacement: 1.5 L (1,468 cc); 1.6 L (1,595 cc); 1.8 L (1,796 cc); 2.0 L (1,997 cc); 2.4 L (2,351 cc)
- Cylinder bore: 81.5 mm (3.21 in); 82 mm (3.23 in); 82.3 mm (3.24 in); 85 mm (3.35 in)
- Piston stroke: 75 mm (2.95 in); 88 mm (3.46 in)
- Valvetrain: SOHC; DOHC
- Compression ratio: 9.2:1–10.0:1

Combustion
- Fuel type: Unleaded gasoline
- Oil system: Pressure feed
- Cooling system: Water-cooled

Output
- Power output: 86–141 PS (63–104 kW; 85–139 hp)
- Torque output: 12.6–20.6 kg⋅m (124–202 N⋅m; 91–149 lbf⋅ft)

Chronology
- Successor: Beta

The Hyundai Sirius engine was the company's first larger inline-four engine, with displacements from 1.795 L (1,795 cc) to 2.351 L (2,351 cc). It is a license-built Mitsubishi construction. This engine is no longer used by Hyundai.

== 1.5L (G4DJ) ==
The 1.5 L (1,468 cc) Hyundai G4DJ engine was manufactured from 1989 to 1995 under license from Mitsubishi and was essentially a copy of the 8-valve version of the popular 4G15 powerplant. The engine's advertised power is 74–97 PS (54–71 kW; 73–96 hp) at 5,500 rpm with 12.6–14.3 kg⋅m (124–140 N⋅m; 91–103 lbf⋅ft) of torque at 3,000 rpm.

=== Applications ===
- Hyundai Elantra (J1) (1990–1995)
- Hyundai Scoupe (1990–1992)
- Hyundai Excel/Pony (X2) (1989–1993)

== 1.5L (G4CL) ==
The 1.5 L (1,497 cc) Hyundai G4CL engine features Dual overhead camshafts (DOHC), and the engine's advertised power is 108 PS (79 kW; 107 hp) at 6,000 rpm with 14.6 kg⋅m (143 N⋅m; 106 lbf⋅ft) of torque at 4,500 rpm.

=== Applications ===
- Hyundai Elantra (J1) (1993–1995)

== 1.6L (G4CR) ==
The 1.6 L (1,595 cc) Hyundai G4CR is an inline-four, dual overhead camshaft engine manufactured from 1990 to 1995 under license, being a copy of the Mitsubishi 4G61 engine. It was introduced in the first-generation Elantra. Unlike other power units of this series, this one never had a balancing shaft. The engine's advertised power is 126 PS (93 kW; 124 hp) at 6,000 rpm with 15.3 kg⋅m (150 N⋅m; 111 lbf⋅ft) of torque at 5,000 rpm.

=== Details ===
- Total displacement: 1,595 cc (97.3 cu in)
- Bore: 82.3 mm (3.24 in)
- Stroke: 75 mm (3.0 in)
- Compression ratio: 9.2:1
- Idle rpm: 750 ± 100
- Ignition timing at idling speed: 5° ± 2°/750 rpm

=== Applications ===
- Hyundai Elantra (J1) (1990–1993)

== 1.8L (G4CM/G4CN/G4JN) ==
G4CM is a 1.8 L (1,796 cc) Single Overhead Camshaft (SOHC) engine. The engine's advertised power is 99–110 PS (73–81 kW; 98–108 hp) at 5,000–5,500 rpm with 15.4–16.5 kg⋅m (151–162 N⋅m; 111–119 lbf⋅ft) of torque at 4,000–4,500 rpm. The bore and stroke are the same as the Mitsubishi 4G62 engine. This engine shares its 88 mm stroke with the Mitsubishi 4G67 from which it is derived, but due to its 80.6 mm bore, displacement is kept beneath the 1800 cc threshold, allowing for lower road taxes in some markets.

=== Applications (G4CM) ===
- Hyundai Elantra (1990–1993)
- Hyundai Sonata (1988–1998)

G4CN is the 1.8 L (1,836 cc) DOHC engine based on the Mitsubishi 4G67. Bore and stroke is 81.5 mm × 88 mm (3.21 in × 3.46 in), the engine's advertised power is 128–135 PS (94–99 kW; 126–133 hp) at 6,000 rpm with 16.3–17.5 kg⋅m (160–172 N⋅m; 118–127 lbf⋅ft) of torque at 4,500 rpm.

=== Applications (G4CN) ===
- Hyundai Elantra (1993–1999)
- Hyundai Sonata (1993–1998)

G4JN (Sirius II) is a 1.8 L (1,836 cc) Korean version DOHC engine with an 81.5 mm bore and 88 mm stroke. Output was up to 133 PS (98 kW; 131 hp) at 6,000 rpm with 17.2 kg⋅m (169 N⋅m; 124 lbf⋅ft) of torque at 4,500 rpm.

=== Applications (G4JN) ===
- Hyundai Sonata (EF) (1998–2001)
- Kia Optima (MS) (2000–2005)

== 2.0L (G4CP/G4JP/L4CP/L4JP) ==
G4CP is Hyundai's name for the 2.0 L (1,997 cc) Mitsubishi 4G63 engine. Bore x stroke is 85 mm × 88 mm (3.35 in × 3.46 in), the engine's advertised power is 109–120 PS (80–88 kW; 108–118 hp) at 5,000 rpm with 16.2–18.1 kg⋅m (159–178 N⋅m; 117–131 lbf⋅ft) of torque at 4,000 rpm.

=== Applications (G4CP) ===
- Hyundai Grandeur (L) (1986–1992)
- Hyundai Sonata (1988–1998)

G4JP 2.0 (Sirius II) is the 2.0 L (1,997 cc) Korean version. Bore and stroke are 85 mm × 88 mm (3.35 in × 3.46 in). It has a cast-iron engine block and aluminium DOHC cylinder heads. It uses MFI fuel injection, has 4 valves per cylinder, and features forged steel connecting rods. The engine's advertised power is 133–147 PS (98–108 kW; 131–145 hp) at 6,000 rpm with 18.1–19.4 kg⋅m (178–190 N⋅m; 131–140 lbf⋅ft) of torque at 4,000–4,500 rpm.

=== Applications (G4JP) ===
- Hyundai Grandeur (LX) (1992–1998)
- Hyundai Santa Fe (SM) (2000–2005)
- Hyundai Sonata (1993–2004)
- Hyundai Trajet (1999–2007)
- Kia Optima (MS) (2000–2005)
- Kia Joice (1999–2002)

4GA1-1 JAC's 4GA1-1 was developed by Hyundai. It uses DOHC 16-valve and SFI technology.

=== Applications (4GA1-1) ===
- JAC S1(Ruiying)

The 2.0 L (1,997 cc) Hyundai Sirius LPG engine, the engine's advertised power is 82–90 PS (60–66 kW; 81–89 hp) at 4,500 rpm with 16–17.1 kg⋅m (157–168 N⋅m; 116–124 lbf⋅ft) of torque at 2,500 rpm.

=== Applications (L4CP) ===
- Hyundai Santamo (1997–2002)

The 2.0 L (1,997 cc) Hyundai Sirius II LPG engine, the engine's advertised power is 82–90 PS (60–66 kW; 81–89 hp) at 4,500 rpm with 16–17.1 kg⋅m (157–168 N⋅m; 116–124 lbf⋅ft) of torque at 2,500 rpm.

=== Applications (L4JP) ===
- Kia Joice (1999–2002)

== 2.4L (G4CS/G4JS/L4CS) ==
There are two variants of the 2.4 L (2,351 cc) Sirius engine, called G4CS and G4JS; the bore is 86.5 mm, while the stroke is 100 mm.

The G4CS is of an SOHC design; its advertised power is 118–130 PS (87–96 kW; 116–128 hp) at 4,500–5,000 rpm with 18.5–19.9 kg⋅m (181–195 N⋅m; 134–144 lbf⋅ft) of torque at 2,500–4,000 rpm. Like the Mitsubishi engine it was derived from, the G4CS was fitted with balance shafts.

=== Applications (G4CS) ===
- Hyundai Grandeur (1986–1998)
- Hyundai Sonata (1988–1991)
- Hyundai Starex (1997–2004)

The G4JS has a compression ratio of 10.0:1. Output is 141 PS (104 kW) at 5,500 rpm with 20.6 kg⋅m (202 N⋅m; 149 lbf⋅ft) of torque at 3,000 rpm. It has a cast iron engine block and aluminum DOHC cylinder heads. It uses MPI fuel injection and features forged steel connecting rods.

=== Applications (G4JS) ===
- Hyundai Santa Fe
- Hyundai Sonata
- Hyundai Starex
- Kia Optima (2000–2005)
- Kia Sorento

The L4CS variant makes 100 PS (74 kW; 99 hp) at 4,000 rpm with 18.3 kg⋅m (179 N⋅m; 132 lbf⋅ft) of torque at 2,000 rpm.

=== Applications (L4CS) ===
- Hyundai Starex (1997–2004)

== See also ==
- List of Hyundai engines
