= Hyundai Scoupe =

Sports car

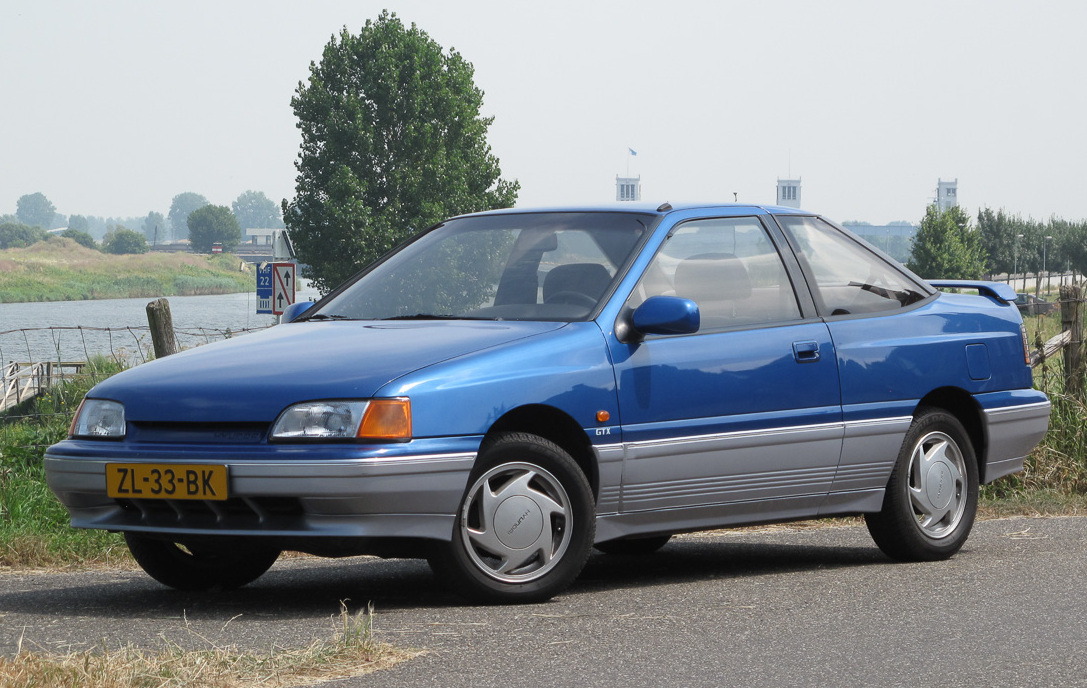
- 1991 Hyundai Scoupe 1.5i GTX Automatic

Overview
- Manufacturer: Hyundai Motor Company
- Production: February 1990–1995
- Assembly: South Korea: Ulsan (Hyundai Precision Products)
- Designer: Park Jong-seo

Body and chassis
- Class: Sports car
- Body style: 2-door coupe
- Layout: FF layout
- Related: Hyundai Excel (X2)

Powertrain
- Engine: 1.5 L Sirius I4; 1.5 L Alpha I4; 1.5 L Alpha Turbo I4
- Transmission: 5-speed manual; 4-speed automatic

Dimensions
- Wheelbase: 2,385 mm (93.9 in)
- Length: 4,215 mm (165.9 in)
- Width: 1,625 mm (64.0 in)
- Height: 1,330 mm (52.4 in)

Chronology
- Successor: Hyundai Tiburon

The Hyundai Scoupe, also called the Hyundai S-Coupe, is a 2-door coupé produced by South Korean manufacturer Hyundai from 1990 to 1995, and based on the contemporaneous Hyundai Excel. The name, a portmanteau of "sporty" and "coupe," was pronounced "scoop".

== History ==
Original (1990–1992)

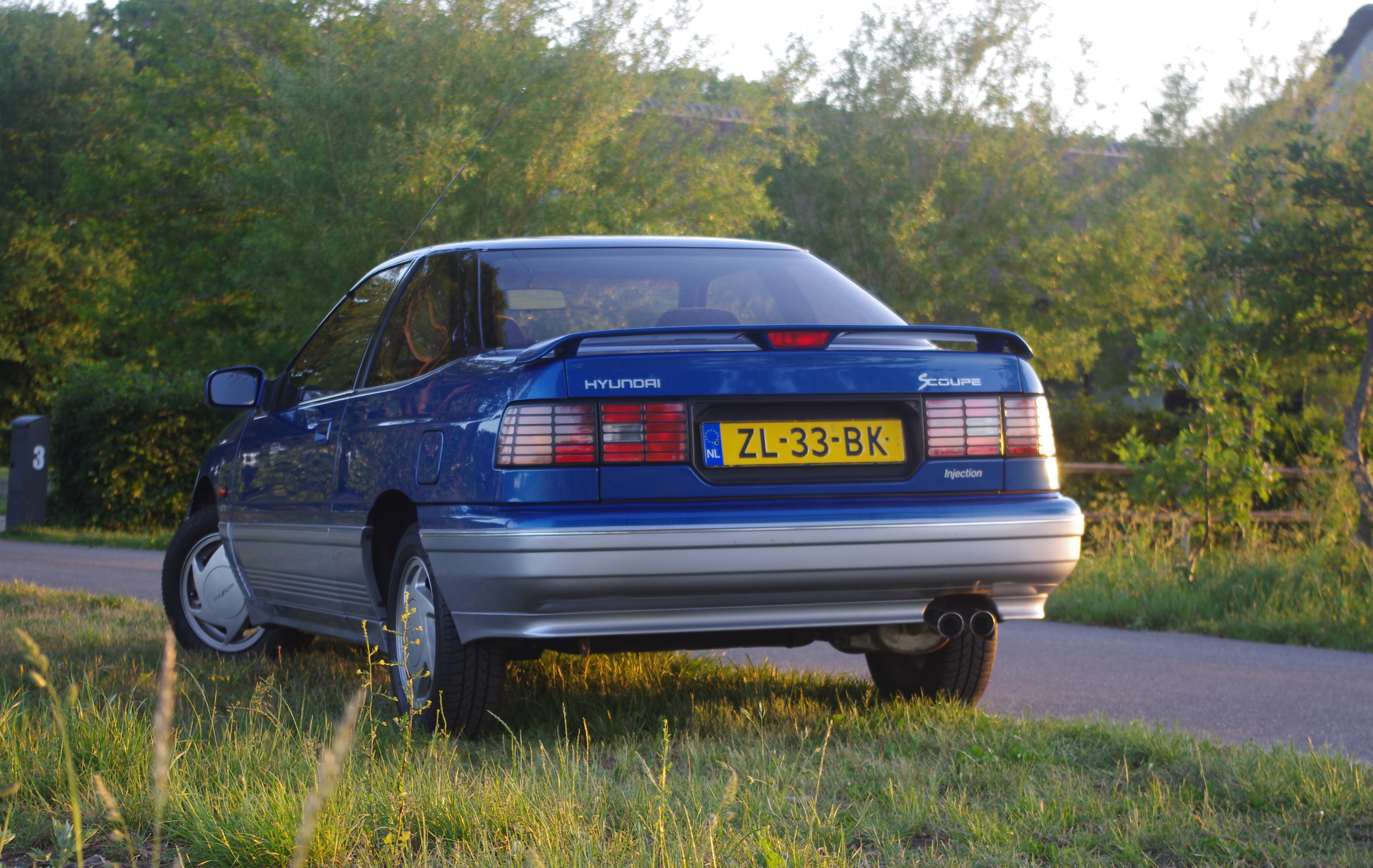
Rear

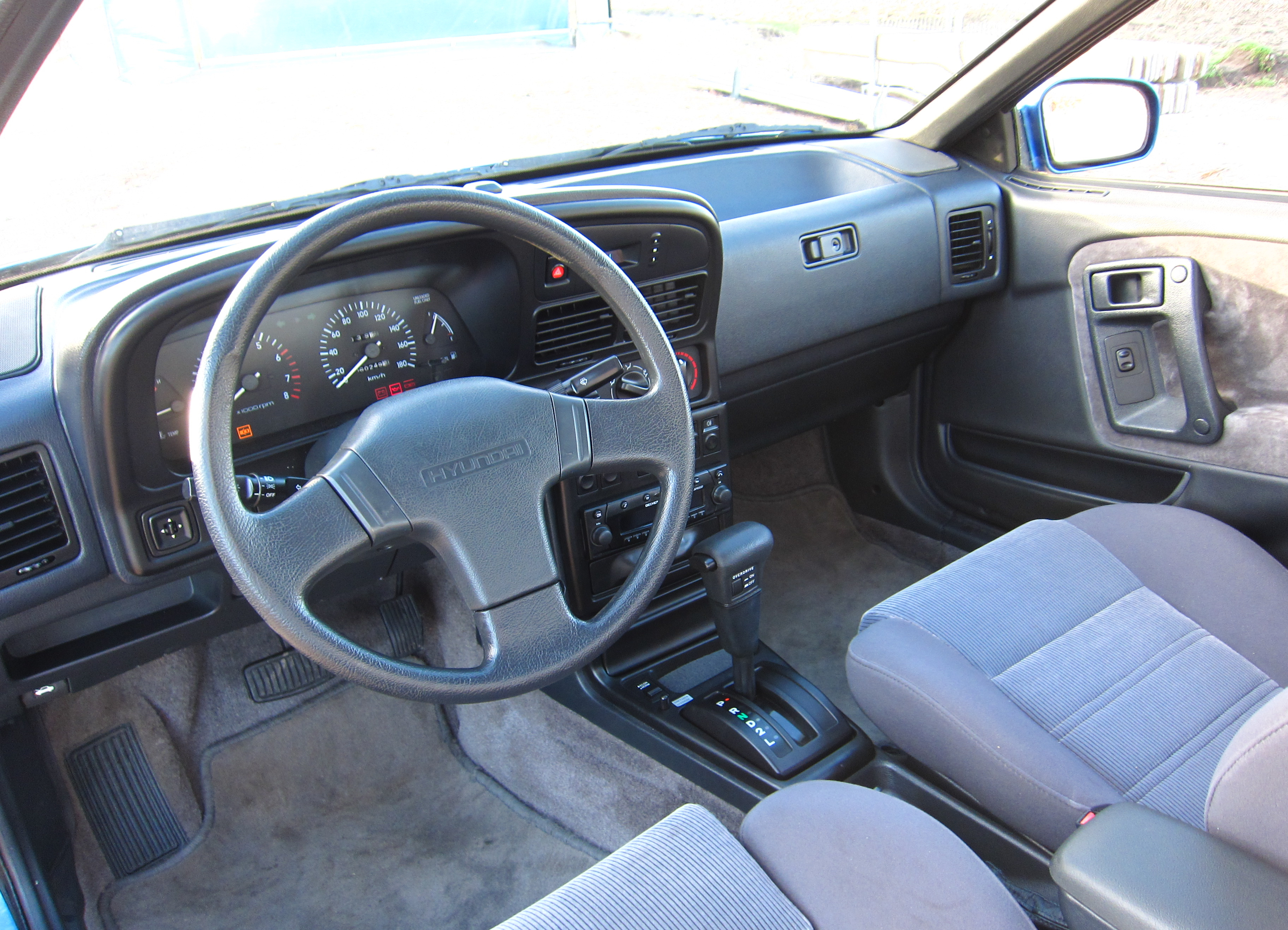
Interior

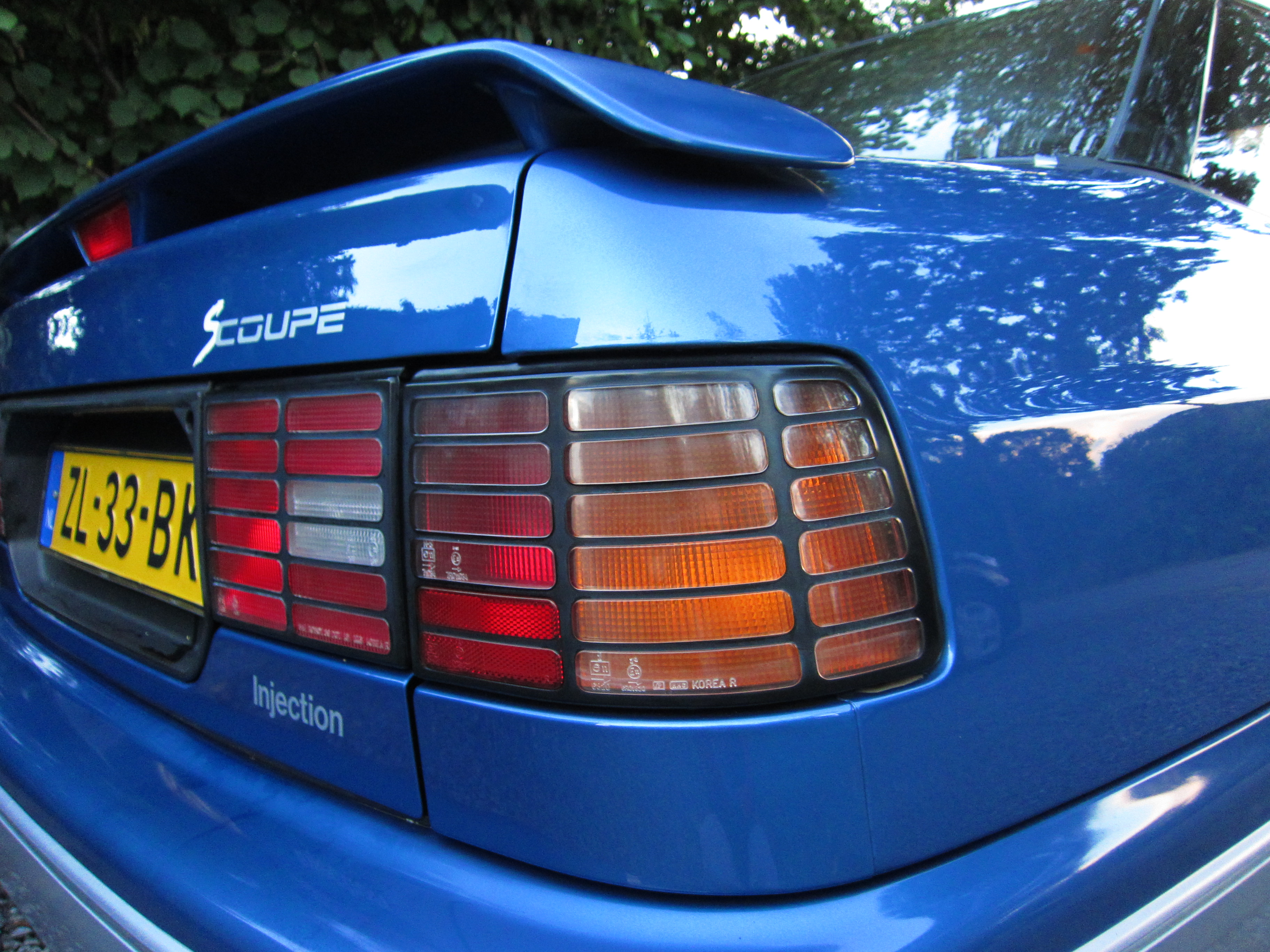
Close-up of model badging and taillight

Development of what would become the Scoupe started in 1985. At the 1989 Tokyo Motor Show, Hyundai exhibited a prototype which was named the "Sports-looking Car" (SLC) concept. Regular production began in February 1990; the Scoupe cost ₩521 billion to develop. The drivetrain and underpinnings were largely identical to those of the contemporary Excel/Pony, albeit with marginally shorter gearing to improve acceleration and to give the car a somewhat sportier image. The Scoupe was introduced to the United States market for the 1991 model year at a base price of US$8,495 (equivalent to $20,100 in 2025), thousands less than comparable sporty coupes. The badging used an enlarged, stylized "S" followed by all-caps "COUPE".

Facelift (1993–1995)

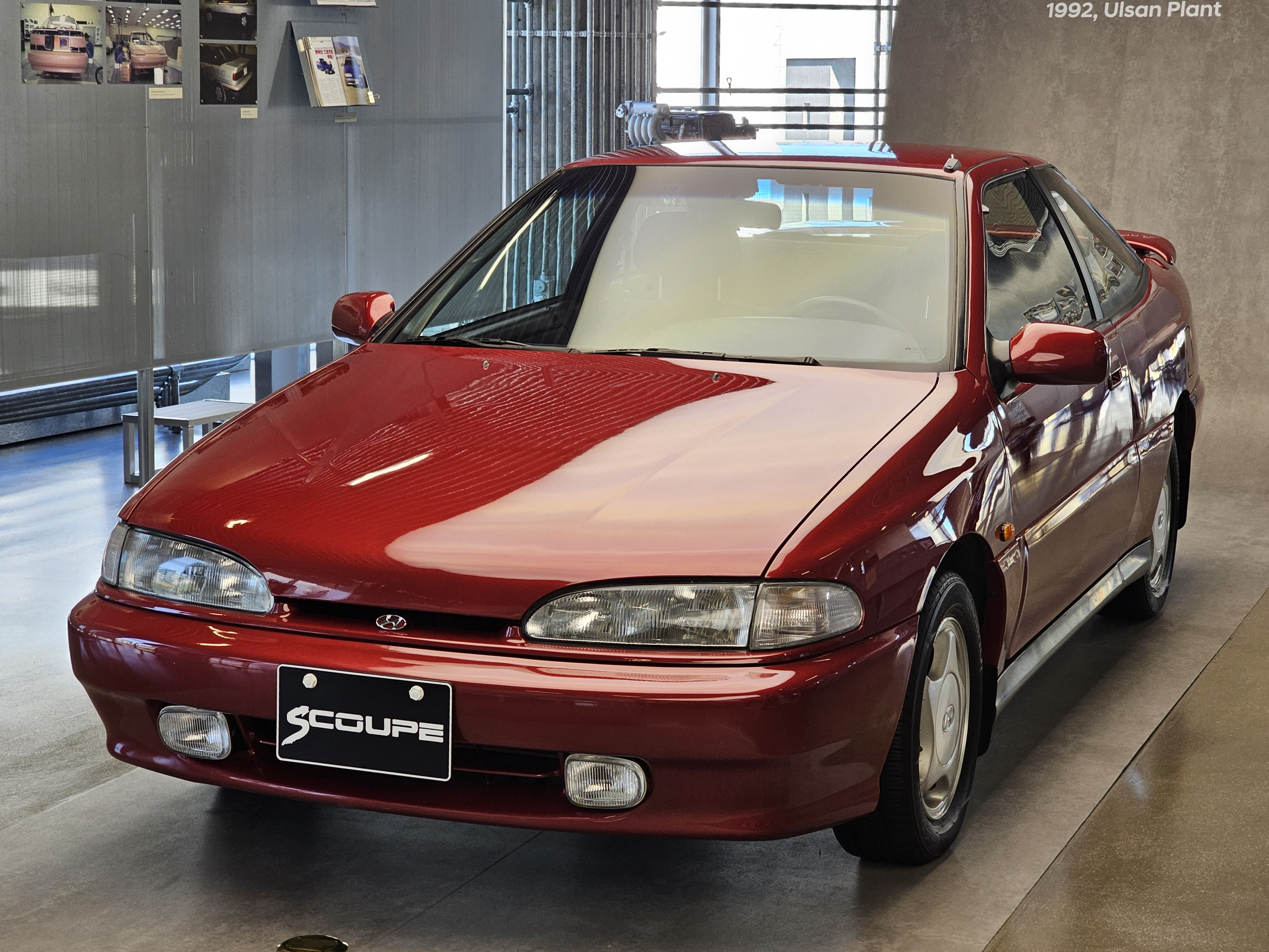
Front view

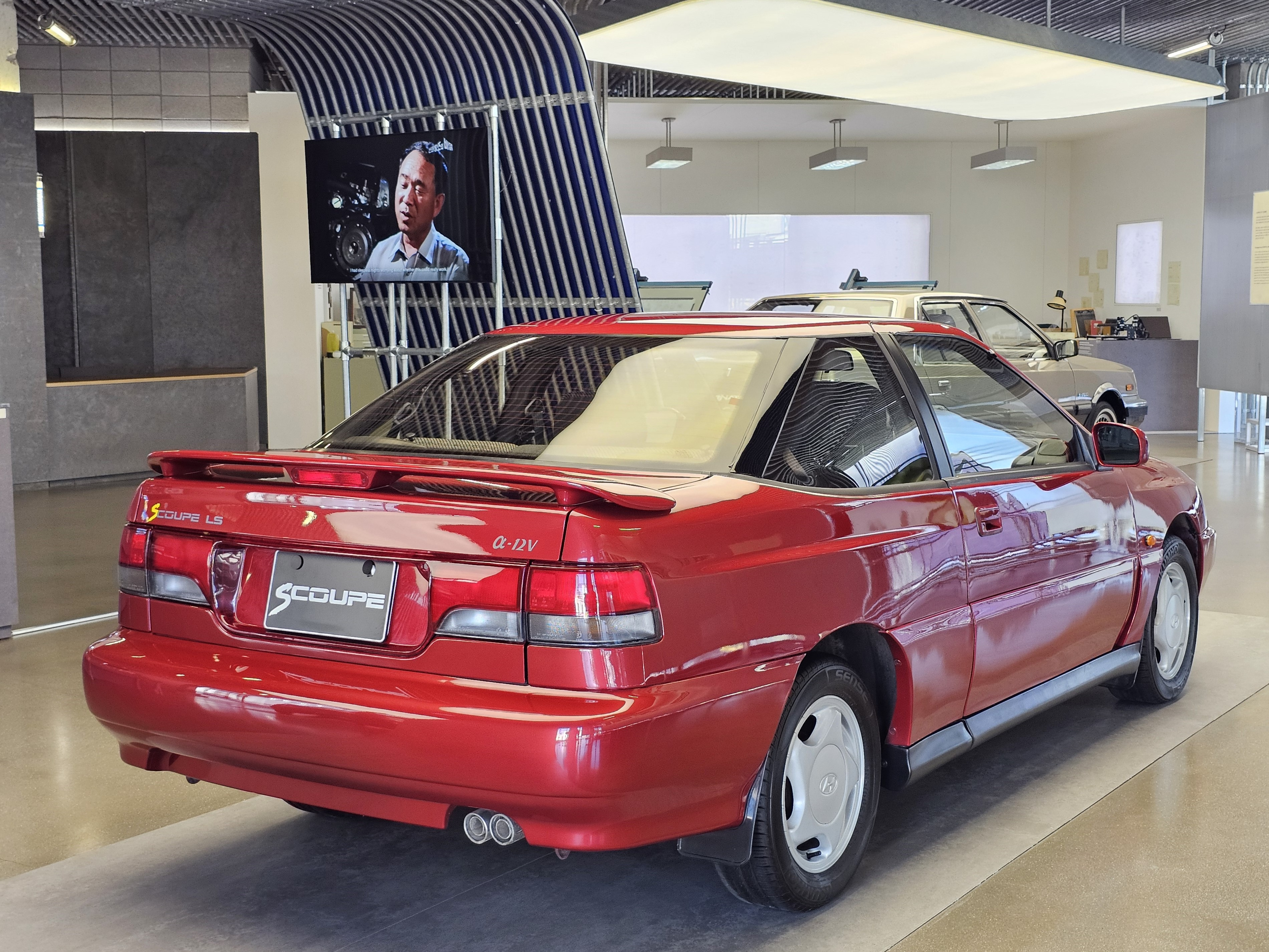
Rear view

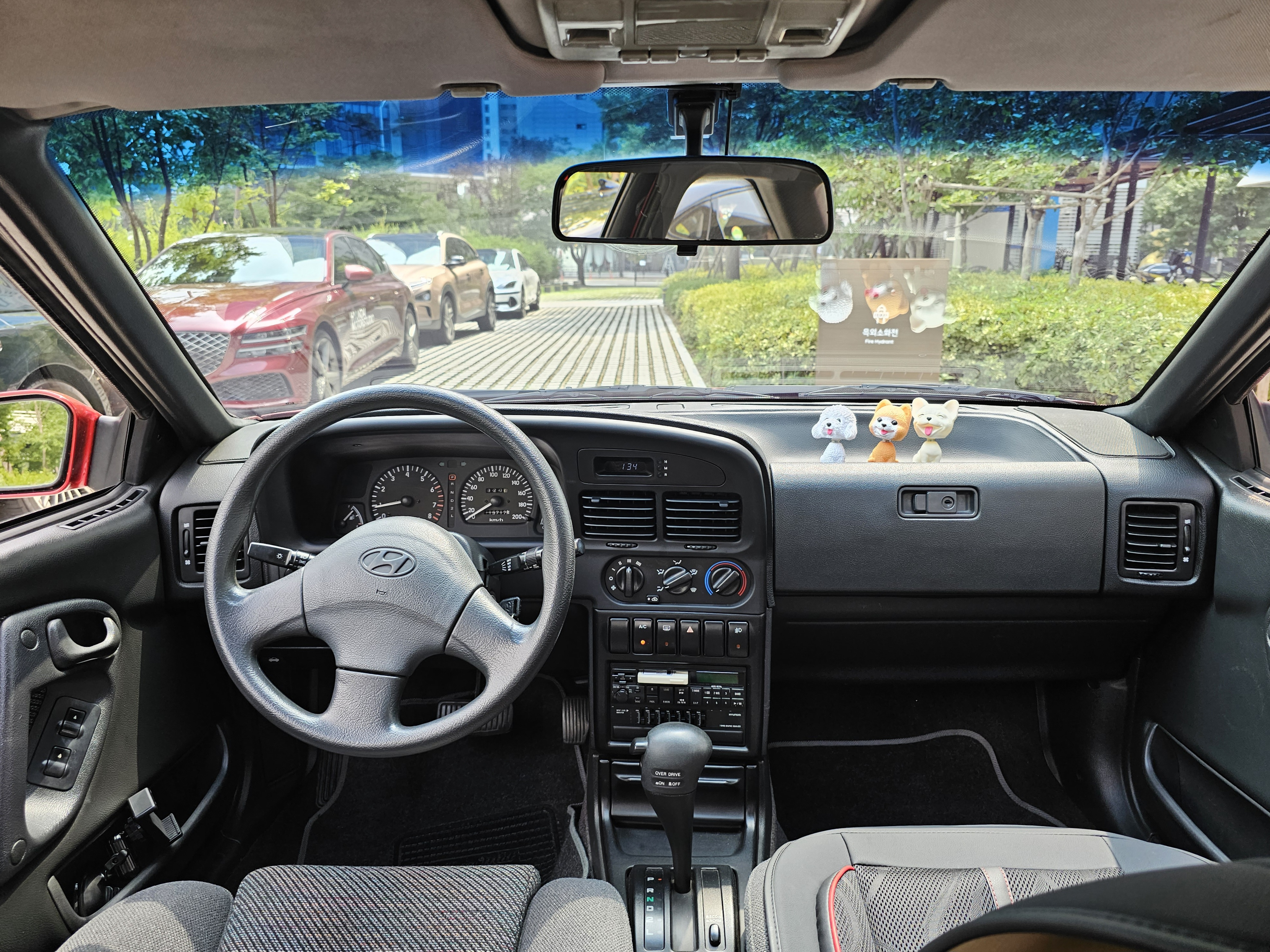
Interior

The naturally-aspirated, in-house developed Alpha engine series replaced the original Mitsubishi design in April 1991, followed by a turbocharged Alpha in October of that same year. The Base and LS models were equipped with the new 1.5-litre, 12-valve, direct-port fuel-injected engine. In the United States, additional changes came with the 1993 model year (July 1992), when Scoupes got a facelift, including the current Hyundai stylized-"H" logo, new flush headlamps plus body-colored side moldings and redesigned front sheetmetal, taillights, and rear bumper.

The car was replaced by the Tiburon in 1996. When it was discontinued in 1995, the Scoupe was one of the last cars sold in the United States with motorized seat belts instead of airbags. In total, 242,441 Scoupes were produced: 63,998 sold domestically in Korea and 178,443 produced for export.

=== Scoupe Turbo ===
The Scoupe GT (LS Turbo in the USA) was Hyundai's first attempt at a sports car and featured South Korea's first domestically designed engine with a cast-iron block and crankshaft. The engine contains an aluminum head, aluminum pistons and steel connecting rods. A special compact pentroof combustion chamber design with central spark plug location was incorporated to optimize engine efficiency. The engine utilizes a Robert Bosch GmbH electronic engine control system and a knock sensor. Thanks to the turbocharging, the engine produces 115 PS (85 kW; 113 hp).

The Turbo model can be distinguished externally by a black roof and "TURBO" badging on the rocker sills. Rod Millen drove a modified Scoupe GT (Turbo) to victory in the Showroom Stock 2WD class at the 1992 Pikes Peak International Hill Climb event.

=== In media ===
This car made an appearance on BBC's Top Gear Series 13 Episode 2 as Richard Hammond's car for the challenge where the presenters are finding the perfect car for a 17-year-old driver.

=== Preservation ===
Hyundai models of the late 1980s and early 1990s are difficult to find in preserved condition. As of 2021, very few Scoupes are believed to remain in use. Several dedicated groups still exist, the main one being scoupetech found on Facebook. In Korea, the Sports Coupe Family (SCF) was the original Scoupe club, but is now defunct.

One facelifted white Scoupe has been preserved and is on display at the Hyundai Namyang Research Institute's R&D History Hall. Millen's Pikes Peak-winning 1992 Turbo has also been preserved.

== Design and specifications ==
As initially launched, the Scoupe was powered by an 81 hp (60 kW), 1.5L Mitsubishi-sourced 4G15 I4 engine (internally referred to as the Hyundai Sirius G4DJ engine), driving the front wheels via a 5-speed manual or 4-speed automatic transmission.

The 4G15 was replaced in May 1991 by the 1,495 cc Alpha, with a 75.5 mm (2.97 in) bore and an 83.5 mm (3.29 in) stroke. It was available both as a naturally aspirated engine and a turbocharged engine. The naturally aspirated version produced 92 hp (69 kW) at 5,500 rpm and 97 lb⋅ft (132 N⋅m) of torque at 4,000 rpm, with a 10:1 compression ratio, and the turbocharged version produced 115 hp (86 kW) at 5,500 rpm and 123 lb⋅ft (167 N⋅m) of torque at 4,500 rpm, with a 7.5:1 compression ratio. The naturally aspirated Alpha has a 14 percent increase in power over its 1.5-litre, Mitsubishi-designed predecessor, and the turbo produces 42 percent more power. Turbos came only with 5-speed manual shift, while Base and LS models could have an optional 4-speed automatic.

Hyundai says the Scoupe was the first production application for Garrett Automotive Products' T15 turbocharger, which was new for the early 1990s. The turbo unit includes water-cooled bearings and housings and an integral wastegate.

Hyundai Scoupe/S-Coupe drivetrain summary
Model Year	Engine			Output		Transmissions		Consumption (city/highway)	
Model Year	Name	Displ.	Valves	Power	Torque	5-sp Manual	4-sp Auto	5sp(M)	4sp(A)
1990–1992	Orion 4G15 / Sirius G4DJ	1,468 cc (89.6 cu in)	8v	82 PS (60 kW; 81 hp)	124 N⋅m (91 lb⋅ft)	Yes	Yes	26 / 34 mpg_{‑US} (9.0 / 6.9 L/100 km)	25 / 32 mpg_{‑US} (9.4 / 7.4 L/100 km)
1993–1995	Alpha G4EK	1,492 cc (91.0 cu in)	12v	92 hp (69 kW)	97 lb⋅ft (132 N⋅m)	Yes	Yes	28 / 36 mpg_{‑US} (8.4 / 6.5 L/100 km)	25 / 34 mpg_{‑US} (9.4 / 6.9 L/100 km)
1993–1995	Alpha G4EK Turbo	1,492 cc (91.0 cu in)	12v	115 hp (86 kW)	123 lb⋅ft (167 N⋅m)	Yes	No	27 / 33 mpg_{‑US} (8.7 / 7.1 L/100 km)	—

=== Performance ===
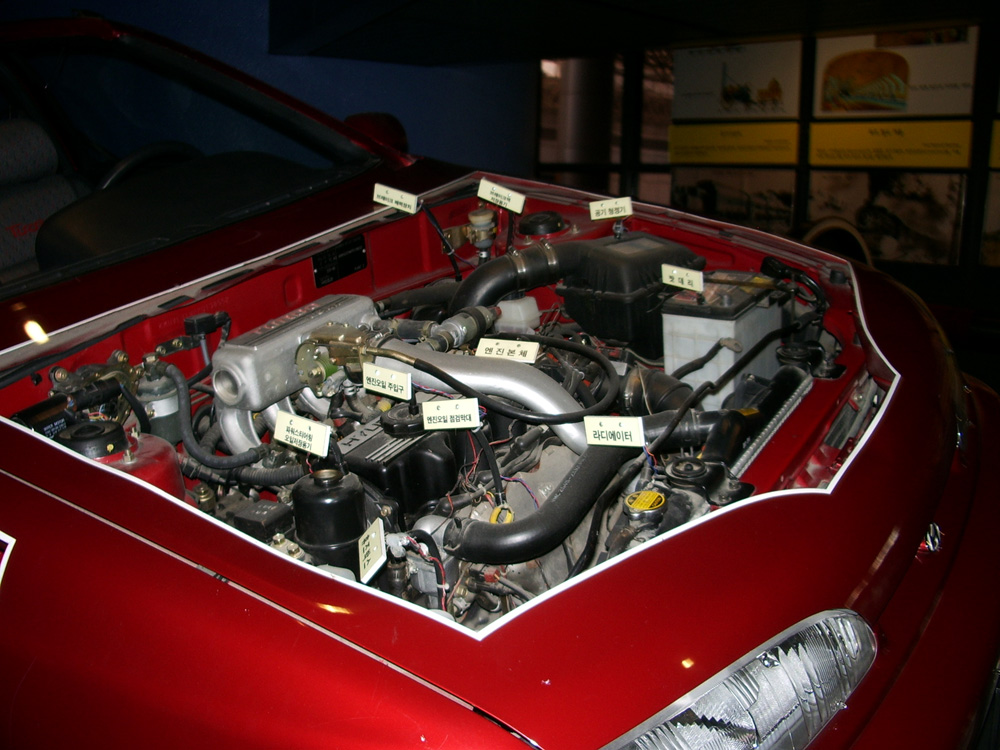
Scoupe Turbo, with cutaway hood

MotorWeek tested a base, Orion-engined Scoupe in 1992 and timed the acceleration to 60 mph (97 km/h) at 11.9 seconds.

The Australian spec S-Coupe GT Turbo has been road tested by several Australian magazines, returning times of 9.2-9.3 seconds for the 0–100 km/h (0–62 mph) acceleration and 16.8 seconds for 0–400 m (0–1/4 mi). Comparable times for the non-turbo version were approximately 12.5 seconds 0–60 mph (0–97 km/h) with a top speed of 100 mph (160 km/h).

The 1988–92 "Base" models with the 4G15/G4DJ achieved 26 / 34 mpg_{‑US} (9.0 / 6.9 L/100 km) city/highway EPA fuel economy ratings when equipped with the manual transmission, and 25 / 32 mpg_{‑US} (9.4 / 7.4 L/100 km) for the automatic.
