= Škoda Beta =

Tatra Beta
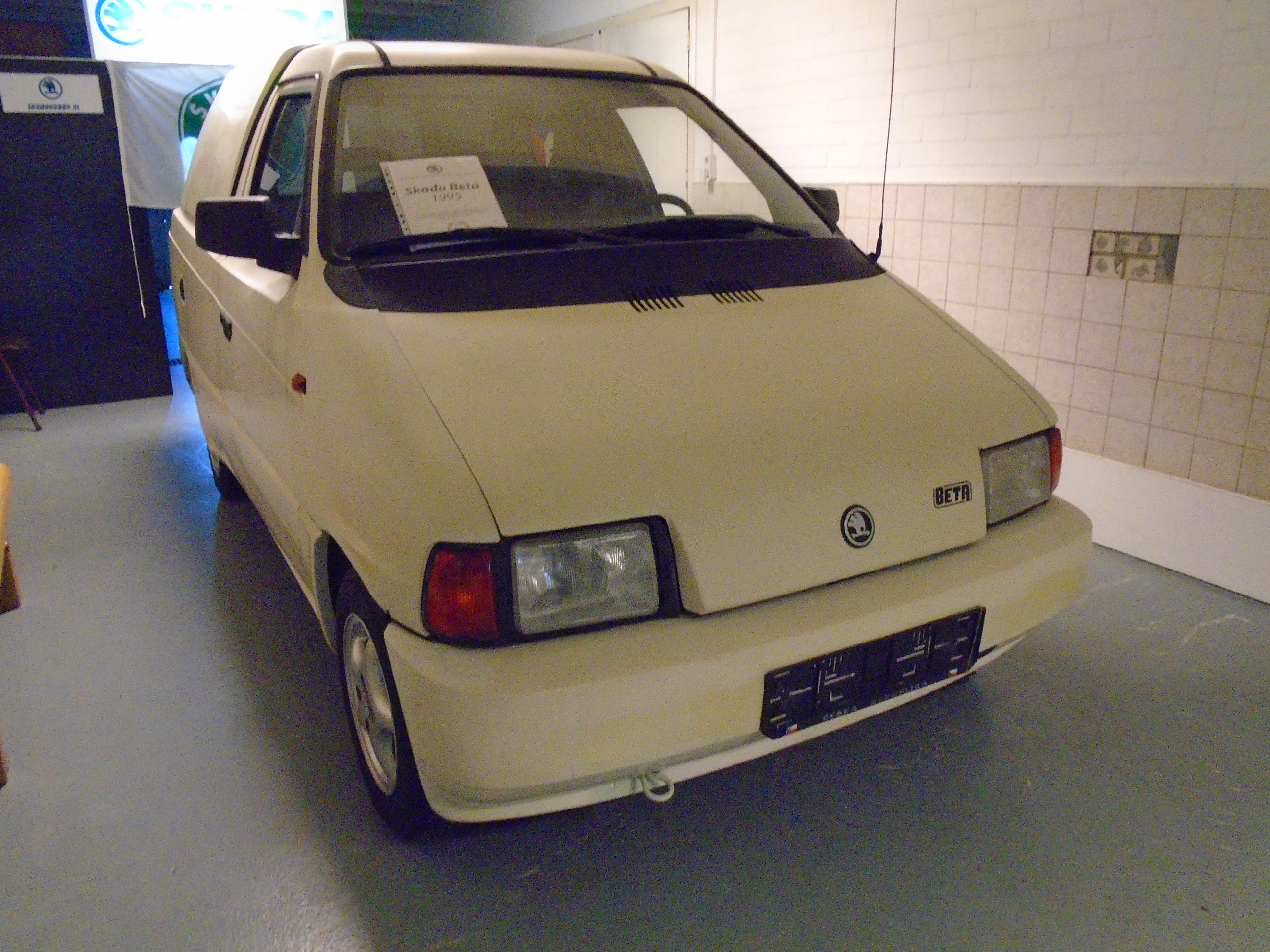
- 1995 Škoda Beta

Overview
- Manufacturer: Škoda Elcar Ejpovice
- Also called: Škoda Beta
- Production: 1994–1999
- Assembly: Czech Republic: Příbor, Ejpovice
- Designer: Milan Strejček

Body and chassis
- Body style: 2-door panel van
- Layout: Front-engine, front-wheel-drive
- Related: Škoda Felicia

Powertrain
- Engine: Petrol: 1.3 L Škoda I4; 1.3 L Alpha SOHC 12V I4
- Transmission: 5-speed manual

Dimensions
- Wheelbase: 2,465 mm (97.0 in)
- Length: 3,890 mm (153.1 in)
- Width: 1,660 mm (65.4 in)
- Height: 1,740 mm (68.5 in)
- Kerb weight: 970 kg (2,138 lb)

The Tatra Beta is an electric van, using nickel-cadmium batteries. This electric car was originally created by Škoda ELCAR Ejpovice, and they were also initially manufactured under the Škoda brand. At that time, the production was directly connected to the production of the Škoda ELTRA, derived from the Škoda Favorit.

== Overview ==
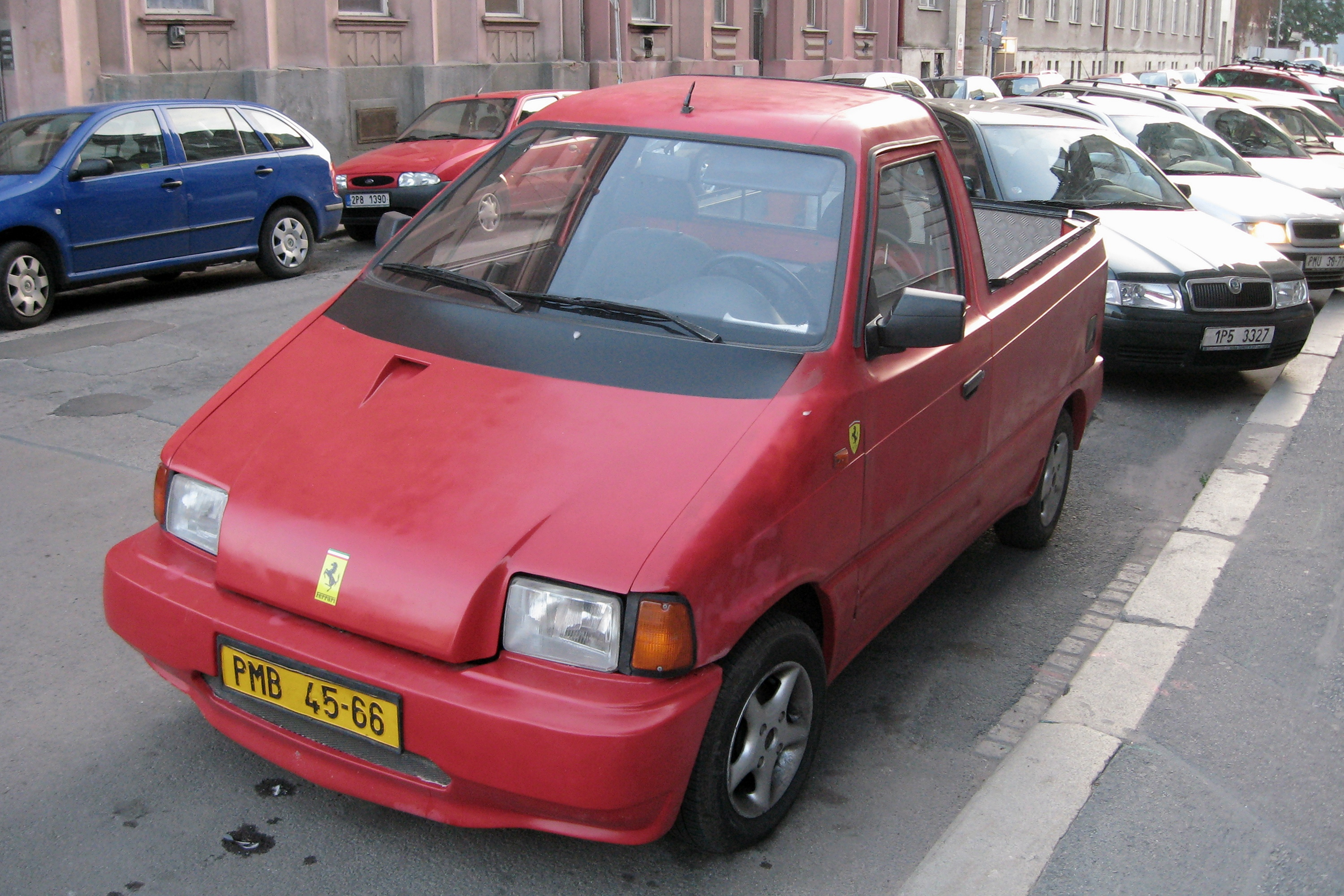
Tatra Beta pick-up

The car was produced from 1994 to 1999. The Beta has a tube-frame and in-mass-coloured fiberglass body panels. Some parts were taken from the 120 L (front turn signals and headlights) and Favorit (chassis, glass, mirrors, handles, locks and interior) and from the Škoda Pick-Up (rear combination lamps). In 1996, the petrol version with Škoda's 1.3 engines also started to be produced. The original electric drive provided an asynchronous electric motor with maximum power of 40 kW (54 hp) developed by Škoda Elcar or by the University of Maribor. It was powered via a frequency converter from a set of 30 pieces of Ni-Cd batteries. SAFT batteries type STM after 6V had a capacity of 100 Ah. Models equipped with them reached a top speed of 110 km/h (68 mph) and covered 120 km (75 mi) per charge.

The production of the electric versions was not started. Only about five prototypes were made. From the beginning of the project, a version powered by the Škoda 781.135B internal petrol engine (Škoda Favorit/Felicia) was also envisaged. Škoda (Volkswagen Group) ended the partnership with independent company Škoda Elcar and a new partner had to be found. Only 100 Škoda Favorit based Beta were produced, a few of them electric. A new partner was found in 1995, when a cooperation with the Korean carmaker Hyundai Motors has begun. A new company was founded - Škoda Tatra s.r.o in Příbor. The car received a Hyundai powertrain, dashboard with instruments and also the entire interior (except door equipment), including the brakes from the Hyundai Accent. The rear axle is rigid with leaf springs and Accent brakes. In total, only about 366 Tatra BETA with Hyundai parts were produced.

Since 1997, various modifications of the Beta have been built as prototypes: flatbed (six cars), box-van or pick-up (two cars). The economic results were poor and the project was terminated in 1999. Today, there is only one Beta EL known of in the Czech republic and one in Slovakia. There are three in Sweden. The Czech MOT has registered about 100 Beta vans and a few of them are drivable.

=== Felicia pick-up ===
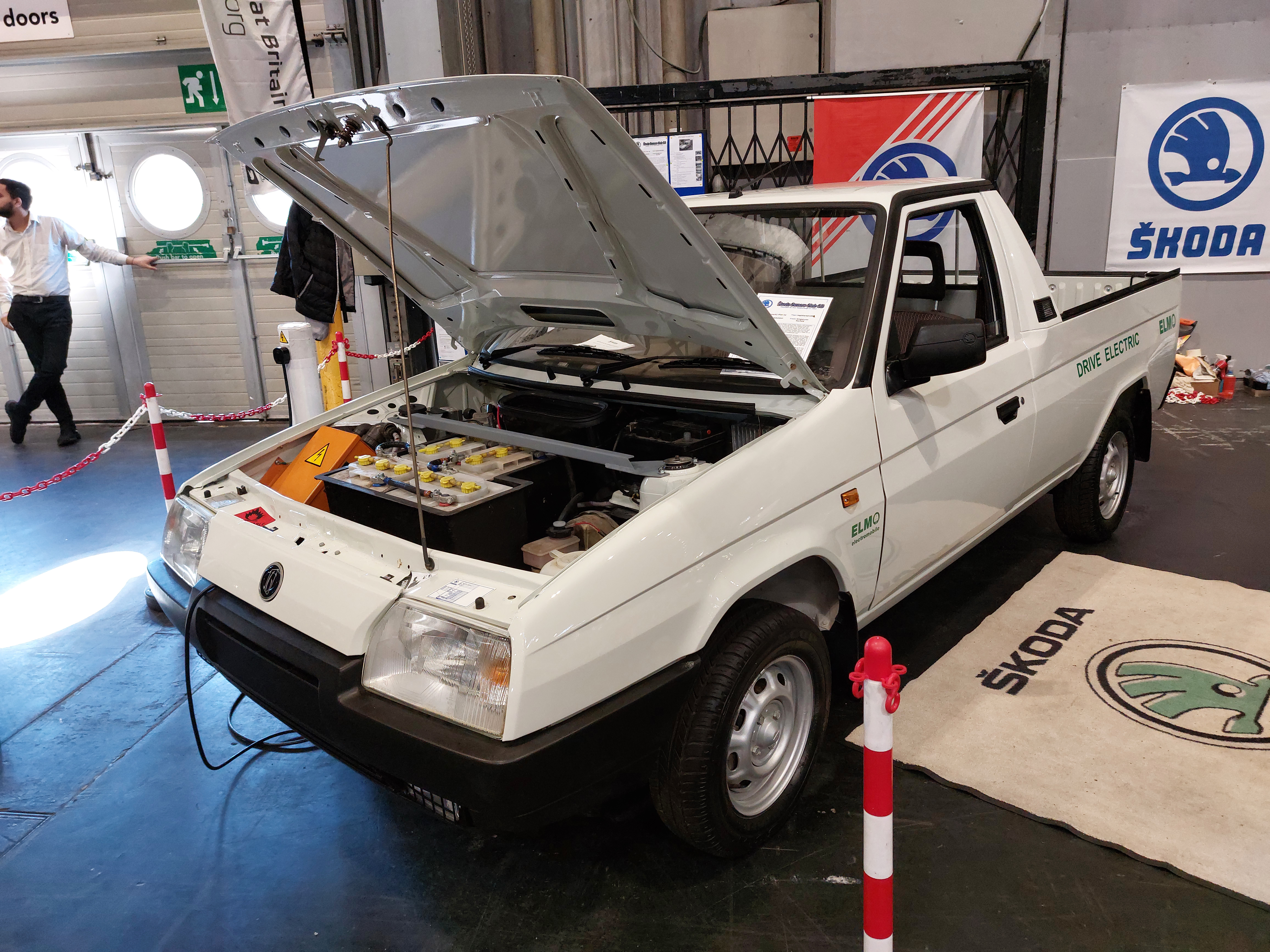
1992 Škoda Elmo Pick Up

Based on the study of the BETA Electric traction drive, it was successful to the students from the Slovenian Faculty of Electrical Engineering in Maribor to create their own university conversion into an electric car using a Škoda Felicia Pick-Up as a base.
