= Hyundai Excel =

Car model

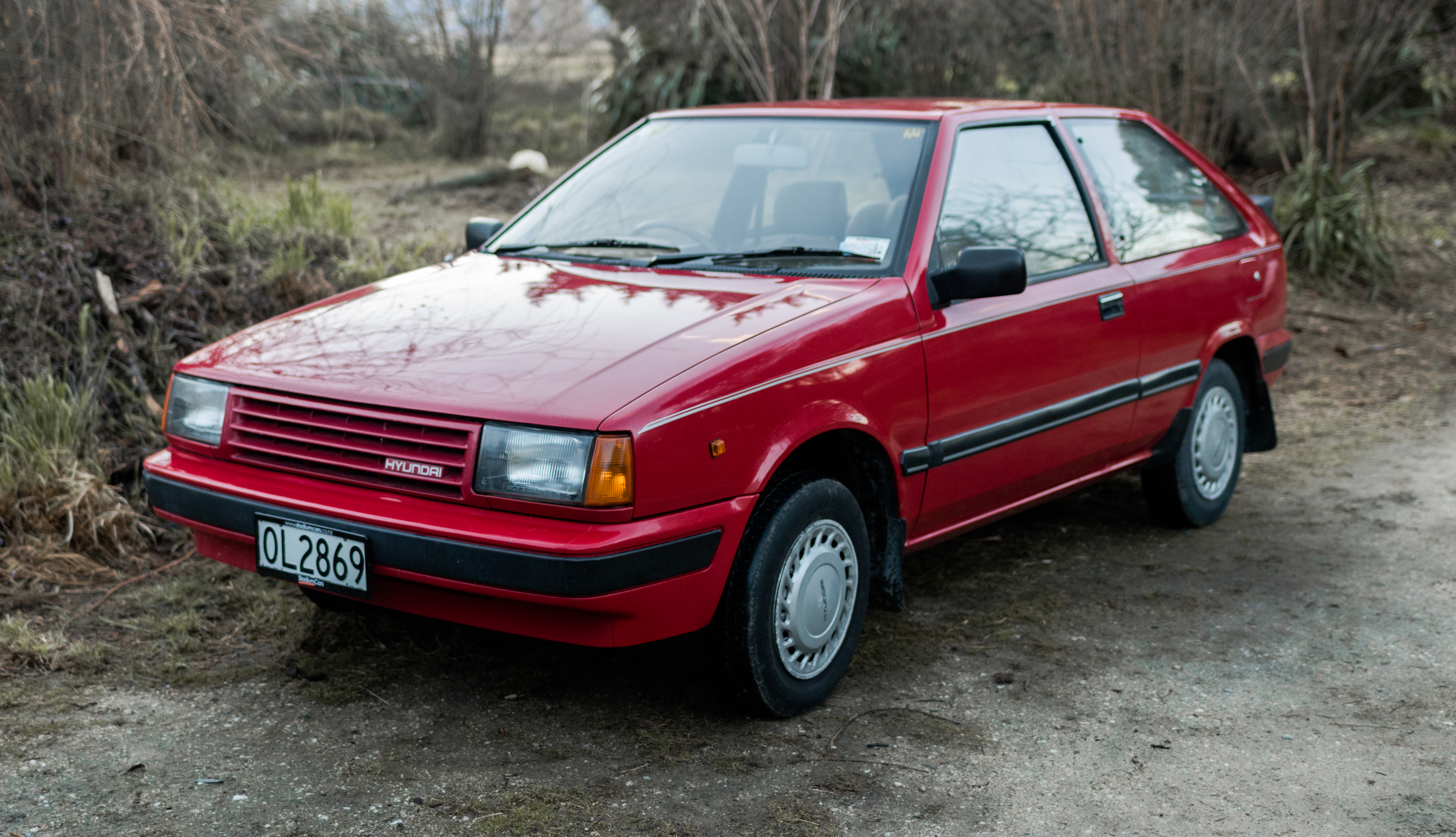
- First generation

Overview
- Manufacturer: Hyundai
- Also called: Hyundai Pony; Hyundai Pony Excel (X1 hatchback in South Korea); Hyundai Presto (X1 sedan in South Korea); Mitsubishi Precis (United States); Hyundai X2 (United Kingdom)
- Production: 1985–1999

Body and chassis
- Class: Subcompact car (B)
- Layout: FF layout
- Related: Hyundai Scoupe; Mitsubishi Mirage

Chronology
- Predecessor: Hyundai Pony
- Successor: Hyundai Accent

The Hyundai Excel (Korean: 현대 엑셀), also known as the Hyundai Pony, Hyundai Pony Excel, Hyundai Presto, Mitsubishi Precis, and Hyundai X2, is an automobile which was produced by Hyundai Motor Company from 1985 to 1999. It was the first front-wheel drive car produced by the South Korean manufacturer. The Excel range replaced the rear-wheel-drive Hyundai Pony.

== Background ==
The Excel was based on the second generation of the Mitsubishi Mirage, but it received its own sheet metal design by Giorgetto Giugiaro. The Excel was available in three- or five-door hatchback and four-door sedan models. The Excel was the first Hyundai car to be exported to the United States.

The Excel was available with either a manual or automatic transmission mated to a four-cylinder engine aspirated by a carburetor or fuel injection system, depending on market and model year.

Originally, the Excel was supposed to be replaced by the Elantra in 1990, but it ended up being sold for four more years until being replaced by the Hyundai Accent in 1994. From 1990, there was a coupé variant called the Hyundai Scoupe, which was replaced by the Hyundai Coupé in 1996.

== Names ==
Some markets, including Europe, had the Excel branded as the Hyundai Pony, although it is not directly related to its rear wheel drive predecessor of the same name. In South Korea the hatchback version was known as Hyundai Pony Excel, and the sedan version was known as Hyundai Presto.

=== Mitsubishi Precis ===
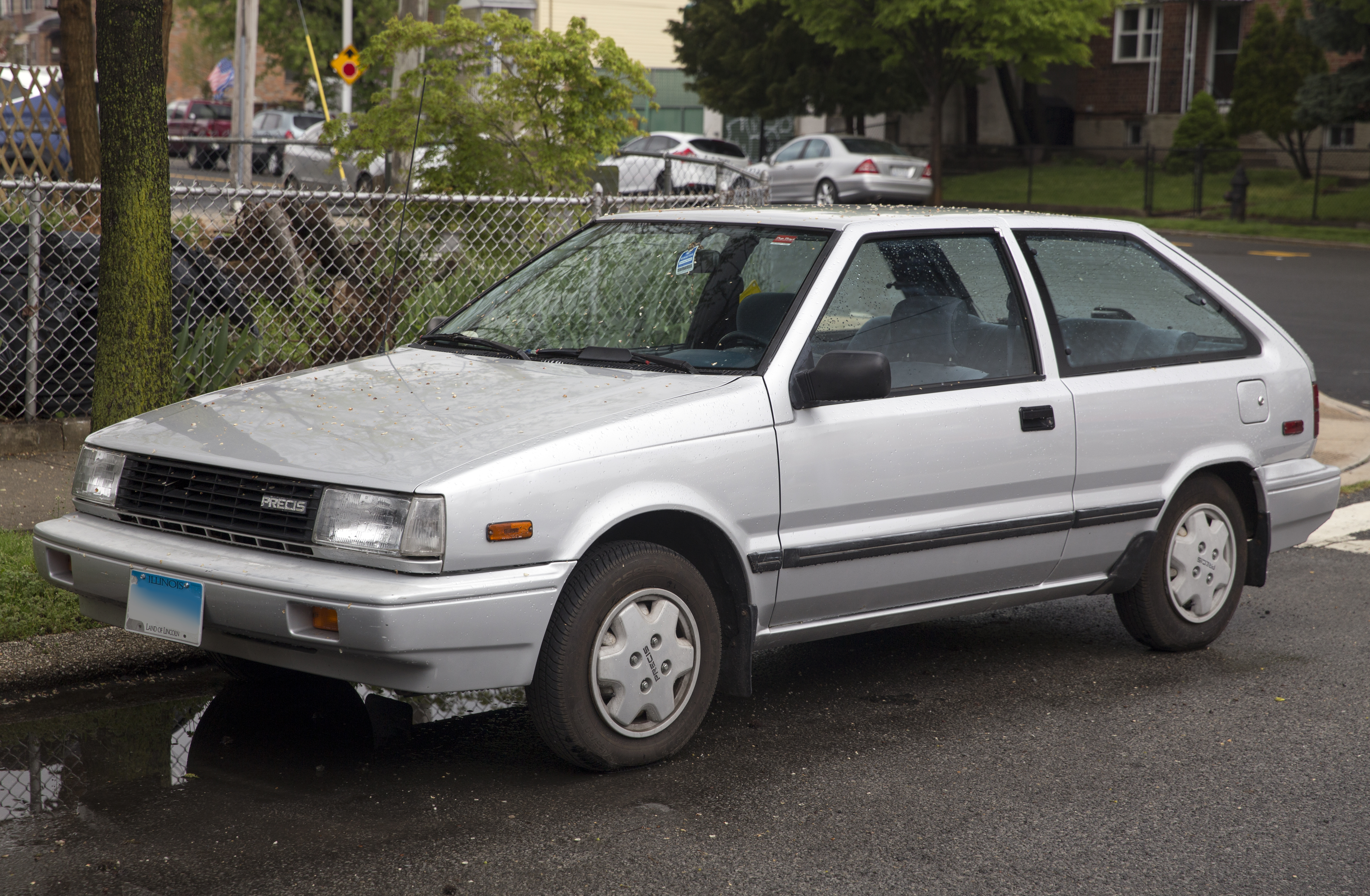
1989 Mitsubishi Precis RS

The Excel was also sold in the United States by Mitsubishi Motors from the spring of 1987 as the badge engineered Mitsubishi Precis. Mitsubishi chose to sell the Precis to circumvent the voluntary import quota which applied to the Japanese-made Mirage. Available as either a 3-door (Base/LS) or 5-door (LS) hatchback, the Precis received the same 68 hp (51 kW) 1.5-liter Mitsubishi four as did the Excel, the Mirage, and most of the Dodge/Plymouth-badged Colts. The car received "Precis" badging on the bootlid, grille, hubcaps, and steering wheel, with the only Mitsubishi logo being a small sticker at the rear which read "Imported by Mitsubishi Motor Sales of America Inc." For 1988, the more sporting RS model was added to the lineup, marking the introduction of a five-speed manual transmission which was also fitted to the LS.

After Mirage production in Normal, Illinois commenced in 1989, thus circumventing the import quota restrictions, the facelifted 1990 Precis (equivalent to the Excel X2) did remain on offer in a limited lineup as a "price leader," slotted below the Mirage. Now only available as a three-door hatchback (no Precis sedan was ever offered) it came in either Base or RS equipment levels. For 1991 the RS was discontinued (and with it the five-speed manual), although an RS trim package was still available this year. A new grille appeared in 1993 and the Precis was discontinued in 1994.

== First generation (X1; 1985–1989) ==
First generation (X1)
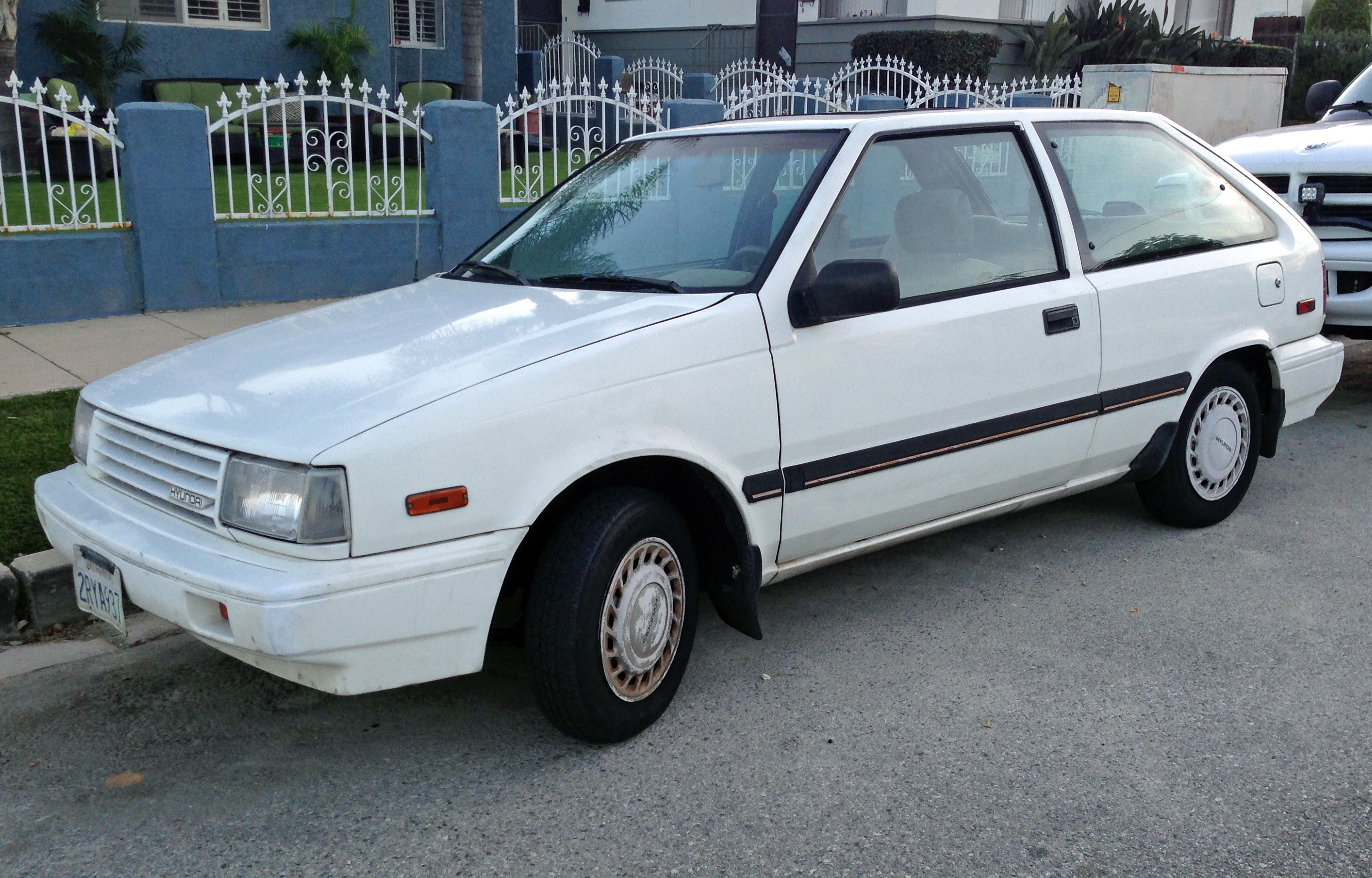
- 1989 Hyundai Excel GL 3-door (USA)

Overview
- Production: February 1985 – April 1989 (until January 1990 for taxi models)
- Assembly: South Korea: Ulsan
- Designer: Giorgetto Giugiaro at Italdesign

Body and chassis
- Body style: 3-door hatchback 5-door hatchback 4-door sedan

Powertrain
- Engine: 1.3 L 4G13 I4; 1.5 L 4G15 I4; 1.5 L 4G15 LPG I4 (Presto Taxi)
- Transmission: 4-speed manual 5-speed manual 3-speed automatic

Dimensions
- Wheelbase: 93.7 in (2,380 mm)
- Length: 160.9 in (4,087 mm) (2-door); 168 in (4,267 mm) (4-door)
- Width: 63.1 in (1,603 mm)
- Height: 54.1 in (1,374 mm)

The Excel was introduced as a replacement for the Hyundai Pony. In the United States, it was the company's first and only model (the previous Pony could not be sold in that country as it did not meet federal emissions standards), but thanks to a price of $4,995 USD and being voted 'Best Product #10' by Fortune magazine, it set records for a first-year import by selling 168,882 units, helping push the company's cumulative production past one million by 1986. In Australia, it was priced at A$9,990. While it did not enjoy sales success initially, in part due to the 87% import duty it attracted, it did become the top selling imported small car in 1988.

In Europe, the car continued the Pony nameplate. It was much more modern than its predecessor with new engines, front-wheel drive and an all-new design. Available engines were 1.3-litre (1298 cc) and 1.5-litre (1468 cc) inline-four engines, producing 66 HP (49 kW) and 71 HP (53 kW) respectively. On the South Korean home market, the hatchbacks were marketed as "Pony Excel" and the sedan was called Hyundai Presto. The 1985 Pony was only sold as a five-door hatchback in Europe. Unlike the first Pony Sedan, the Pony/Excel X1 Sedan had the boot separated from the passenger compartment.

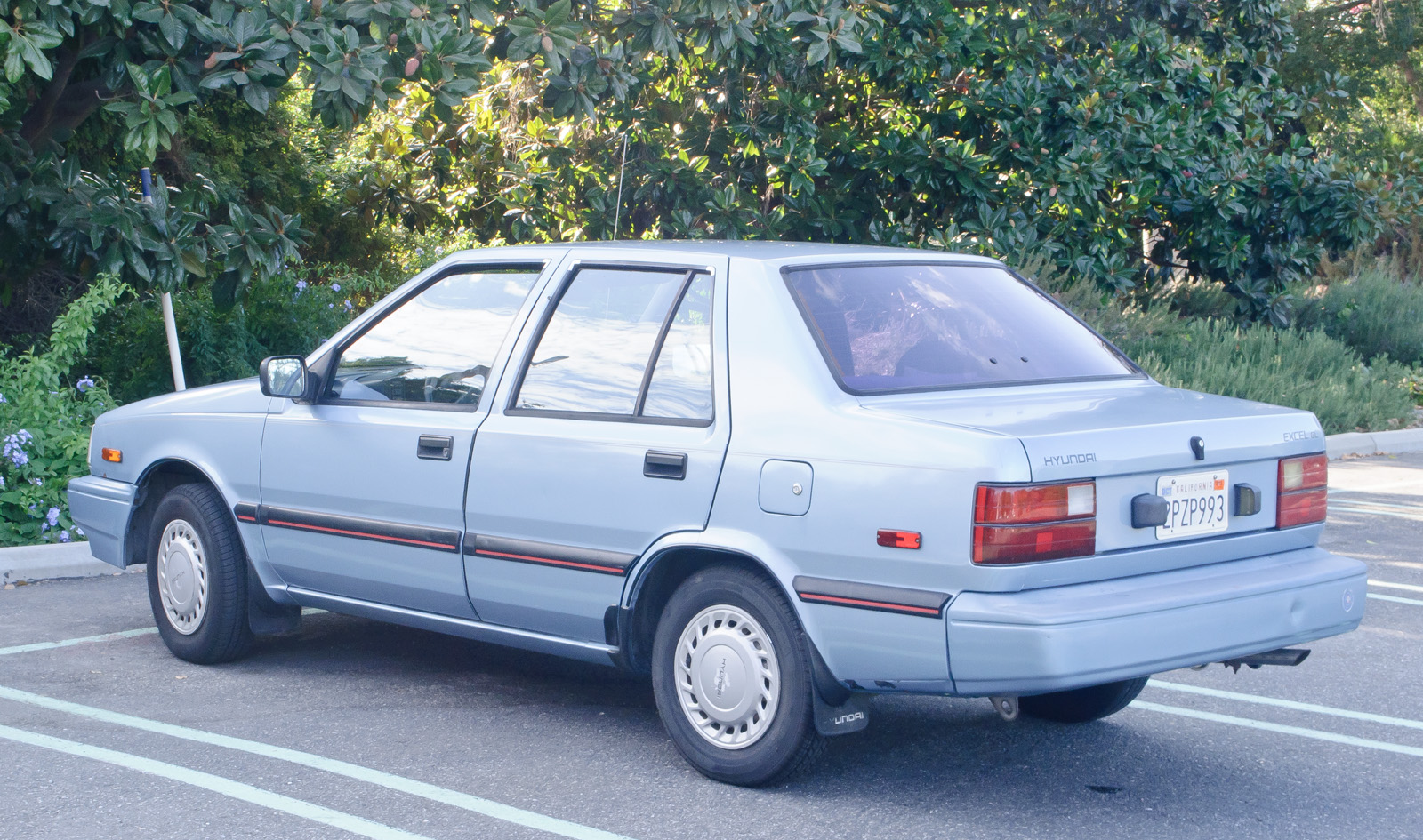
1989 Hyundai Excel 4-door sedan (USA)

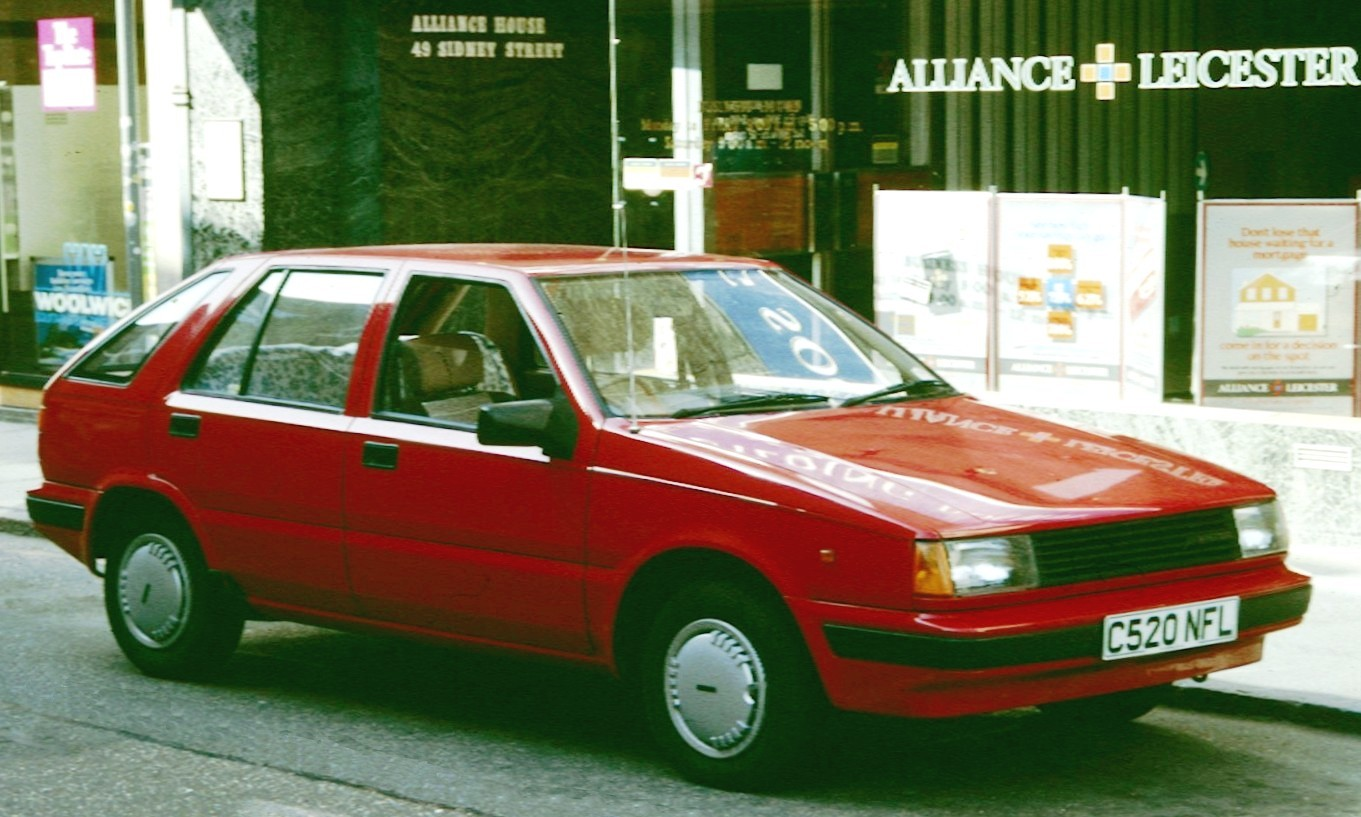
1985–87 Hyundai Pony 5-door (UK)

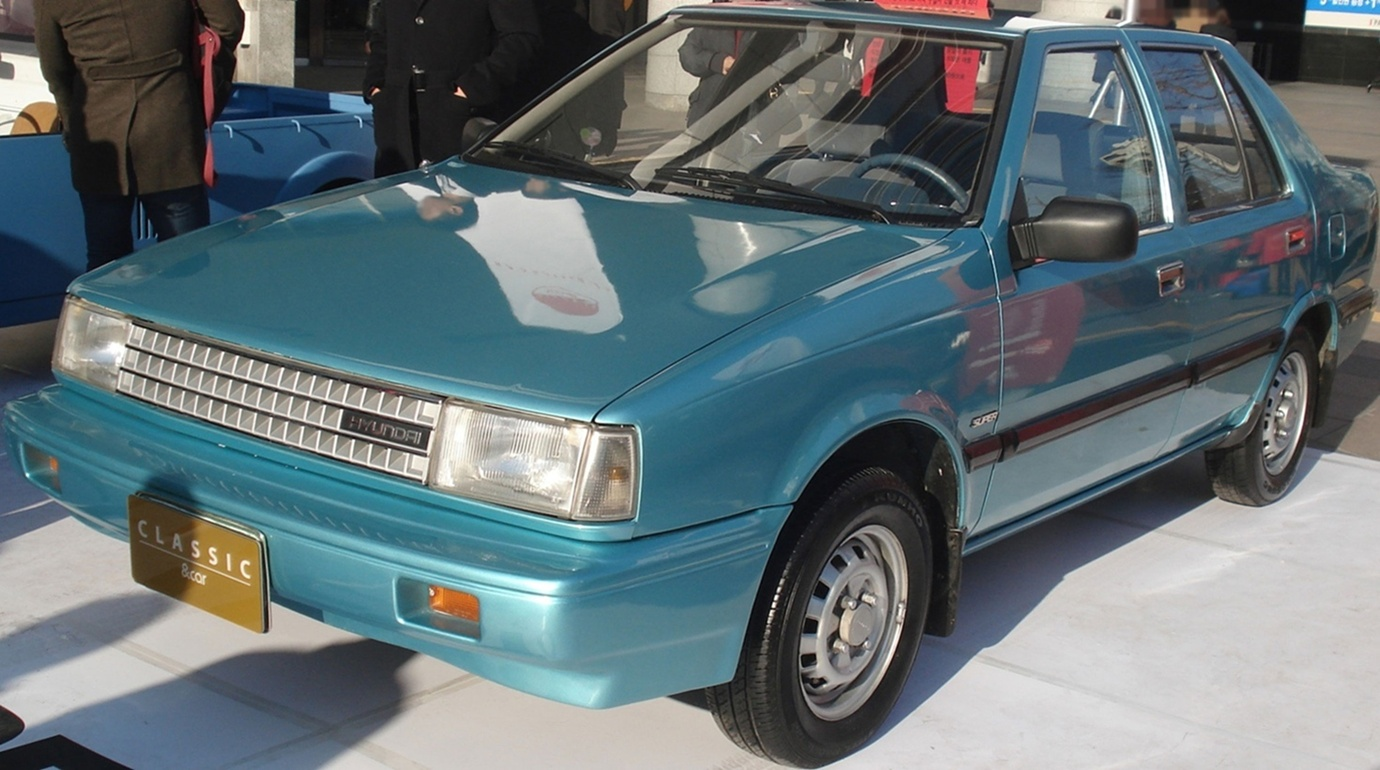
1987 Hyundai Presto 4-door sedan (South Korea)

Versions available were:

North America

- 1.5 base
- 1.5 GL
- 1.5 GLS (5-door and 4-door only)
- 1.5 GS (3-door only)

Australia

- 1.5 L
- 1.5 GL
- 1.5 GLS
- 1.5 GT

United Kingdom

- 1300 L/Sonnet
- 1300 GLS
- 1500 GL
- 1500 GLS

On most European markets, the Pony X1 was available in six configurations:

- 1.3 L, 4-speed manual
- 1.3 GL, 4-speed manual
- 1.5 GL, 4-speed manual
- 1.3 GLS, 4-speed manual
- 1.5 GLS, 5-speed manual
- 1.5 GLS, 3-speed automatic

=== 1987 facelift ===
With the 1987 facelift, the Pony name got the XP suffix in Europe which was also found on the car itself. More important, this series saw the return of both the three-door hatchback and the four-door sedan in Europe. The 1.3-liter engine was discontinued, the 1.5-liter remained unchanged. In Europe, the LE was added as fourth trim level, this being the new entry level followed by the familiar L, GL and GLS models. All trim levels could be combined with all three body styles. An automatic gearbox was again available only on the GLS model.

==== Lineup ====
- 1.5 LE, 4-speed manual
- 1.5 L, 4-speed manual
- 1.5 GL, 4-speed manual
- 1.5 GL, 5-speed manual
- 1.5 GLS, 5-speed manual
- 1.5 GLS, 3-speed automatic

== Second generation (X2; 1989–1995) ==
Second generation (X2)
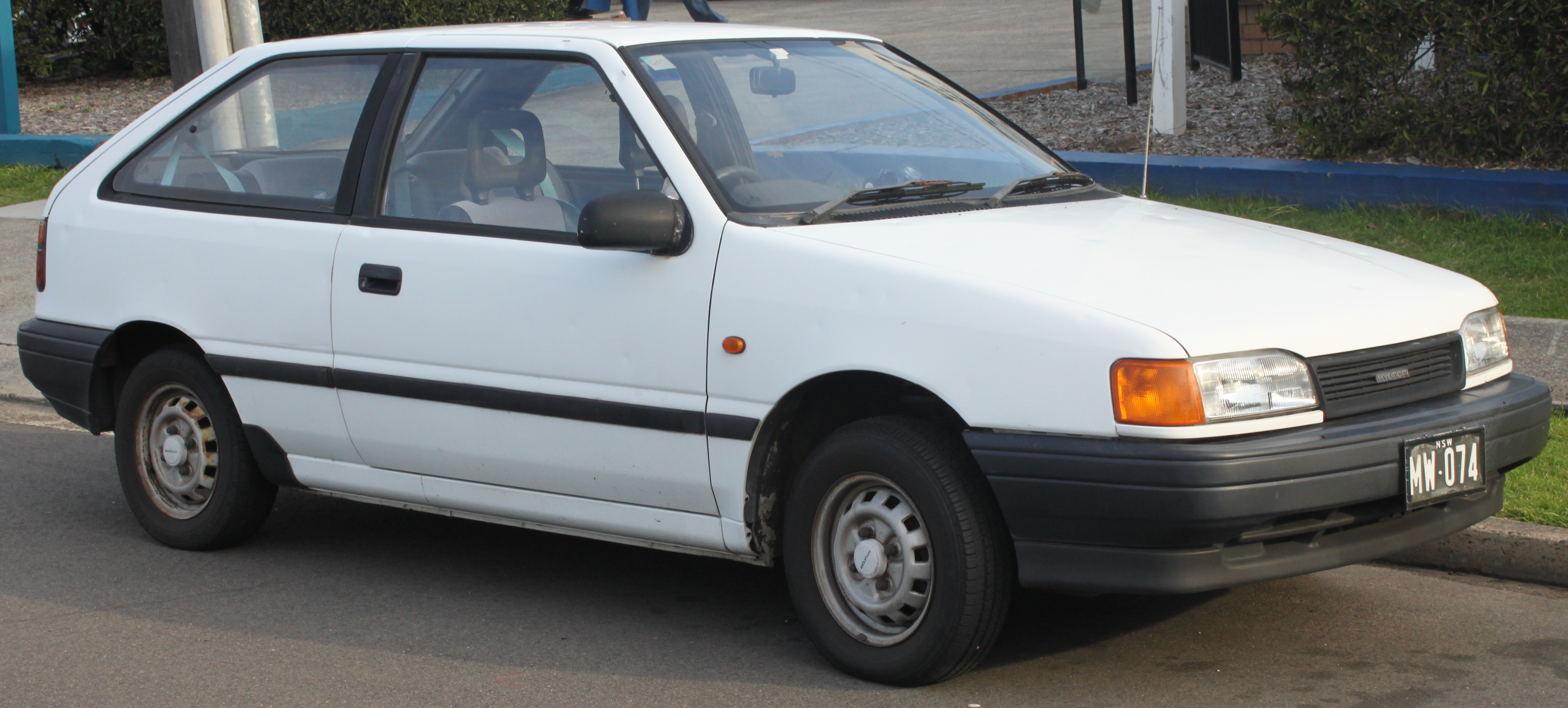

Overview
- Also called: Hyundai X2 (UK)
- Production: April 1989 – July 1994; 1995–1998 (Philippines)
- Assembly: South Korea: Ulsan; Philippines: Makati (Francisco Motors Corporation)

Body and chassis
- Body style: 3/5-door hatchback 4-door sedan 3-door panel van

Powertrain
- Engine: 1.3 L 4G13 I4; 1.5 L 4G15 I4; 1.5 L 4G15 LPG I4 (Taxi Models)
- Transmission: 4-speed manual 5-speed manual 3-speed automatic 4-speed automatic

Dimensions
- Wheelbase: 93.8 in (2,383 mm)
- Length: 1990–91 & 1993–94 3-Door Hatchback: 161.4 in (4,100 mm); 1990–91 & 1993–94 5-Door Hatchback: 168.3 in (4,275 mm); 1992 Sedan: 168.6 in (4,282 mm); 1992 Hatchback: 161.7 in (4,107 mm)
- Width: 1990–91 & 1993–94: 63.3 in (1,608 mm); 1992: 63.1 in (1,603 mm)
- Height: 1993–94: 54.5 in (1,384 mm); 1992: 51.4 in (1,306 mm); 1990: 51.6 in (1,311 mm)

Brought as a new generation, the 1989 Excel was more like a next facelift. A new version of the 1.5-litre engine was introduced, with electronic fuel-injection instead of a carburetor. This 1.5 MPI produced 85 HP (62 kW).

Most remarkable, the 1989 look was very short lived: with the 1990 model year yet another facelift appeared. Another notable fact was the renaming of the four-door Pony Sedan to Excel in Europe. This transition went gradually, for example in the Dutch 1989 brochure photos of a Pony badged sedan are shown while the text refers to Excel. The 1990 brochure shows an actual Excel.

The 1.5 MPI engine was not offered in the five-door Pony. On the other hand, both the Pony three-door hatchback as well as the Excel four-door sedan came in a vast amount of models.

The second-generation Excel was given a facelift and slightly enlarged from 1990 onwards, while its engine adopted multi-point fuel injection, and a new 4-speed overdrive automatic transmission was offered.

The 1.3 model and the Mitsubishi Colt also share the same engine and gearbox.

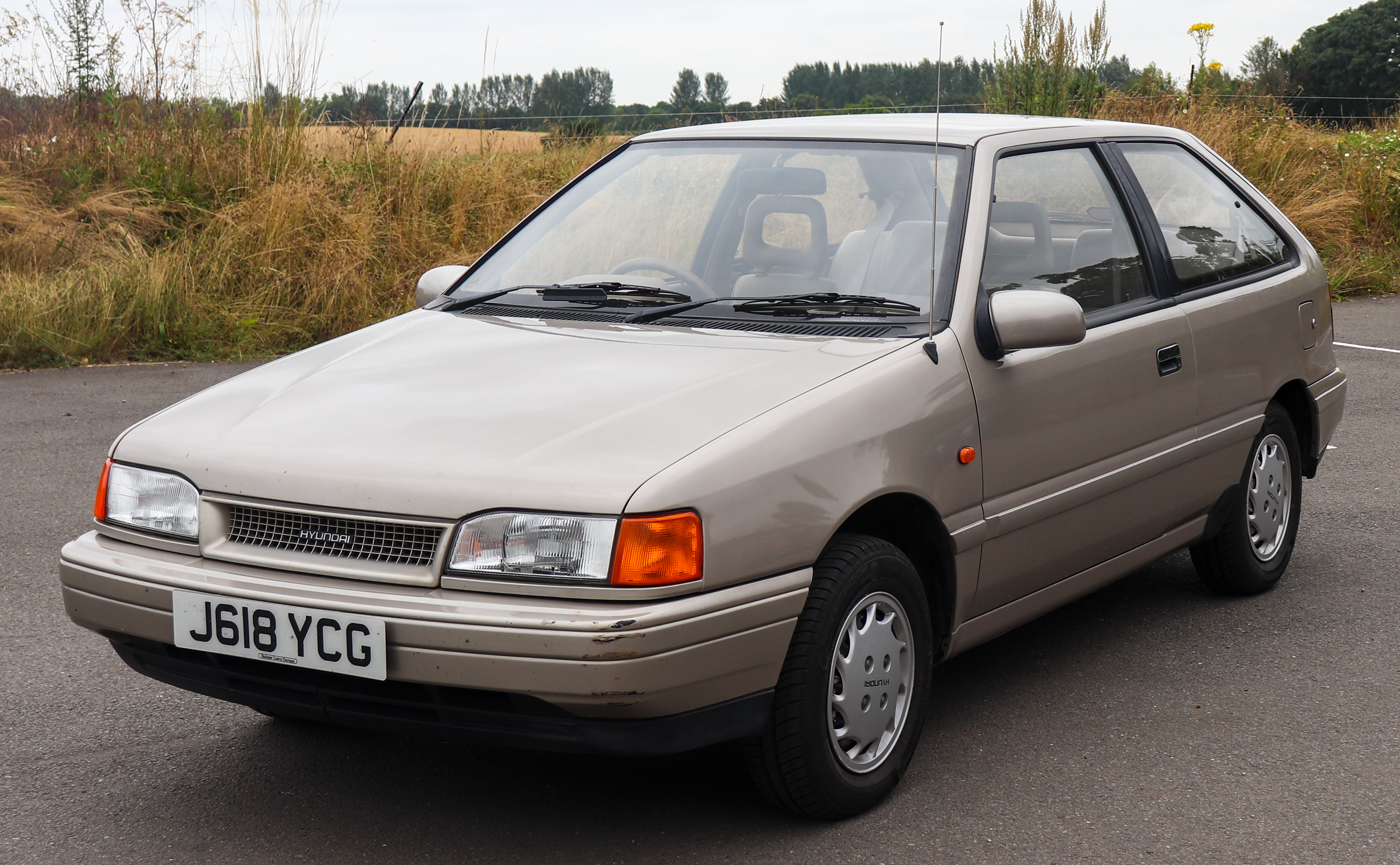
1992 Hyundai Pony X2 LS 1.3 (UK)

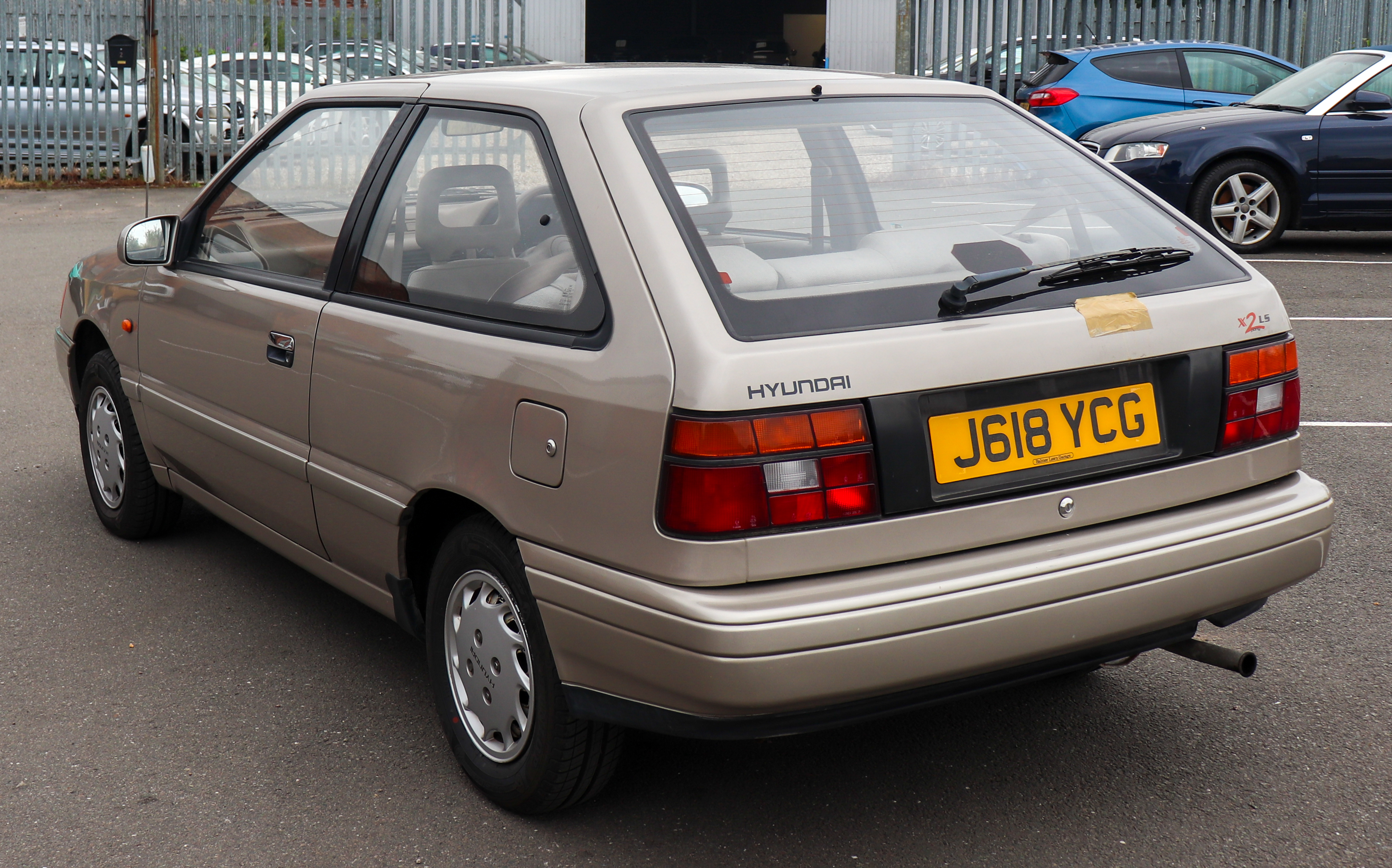
1992 Hyundai Pony X2 LS 1.3 (UK)

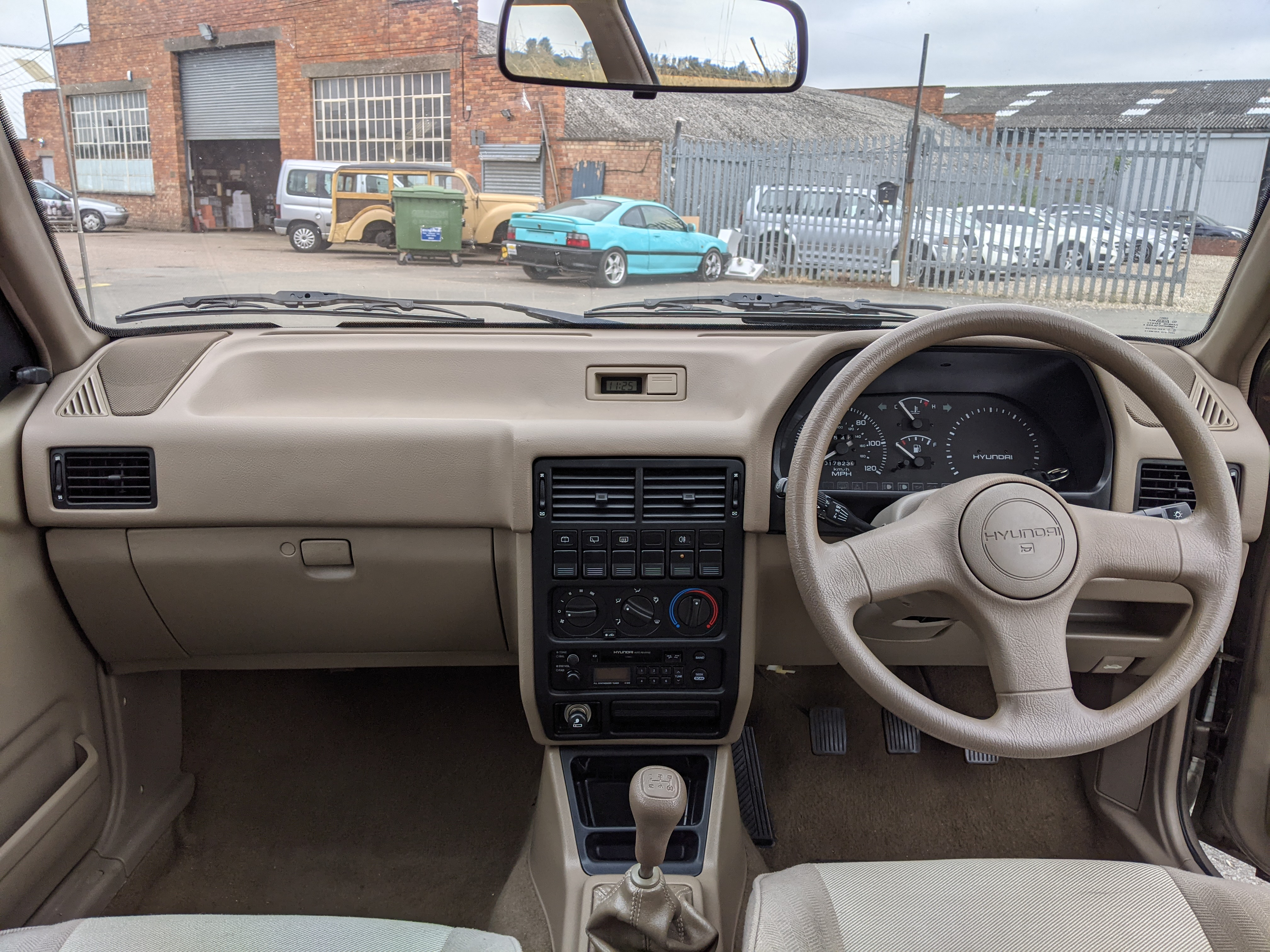
Interior

=== 1991 facelift ===
The Excel's 1989 styling was closely related to the all-new Sonata, which was launched in Europe for the 1989 model year. The mid-sized Sonata underwent a near-immediate facelift for the 1990 model year. The styling of the Excel followed in late 1991 to keep the resemblance with the Sonata. Most noticeable was the front end, where all three cars' orange indicator lenses were replaced by clear ones and the headlamps became less rectangular.

From 1991, the 1.5 versions were badged 1.5i to denote fuel injection.

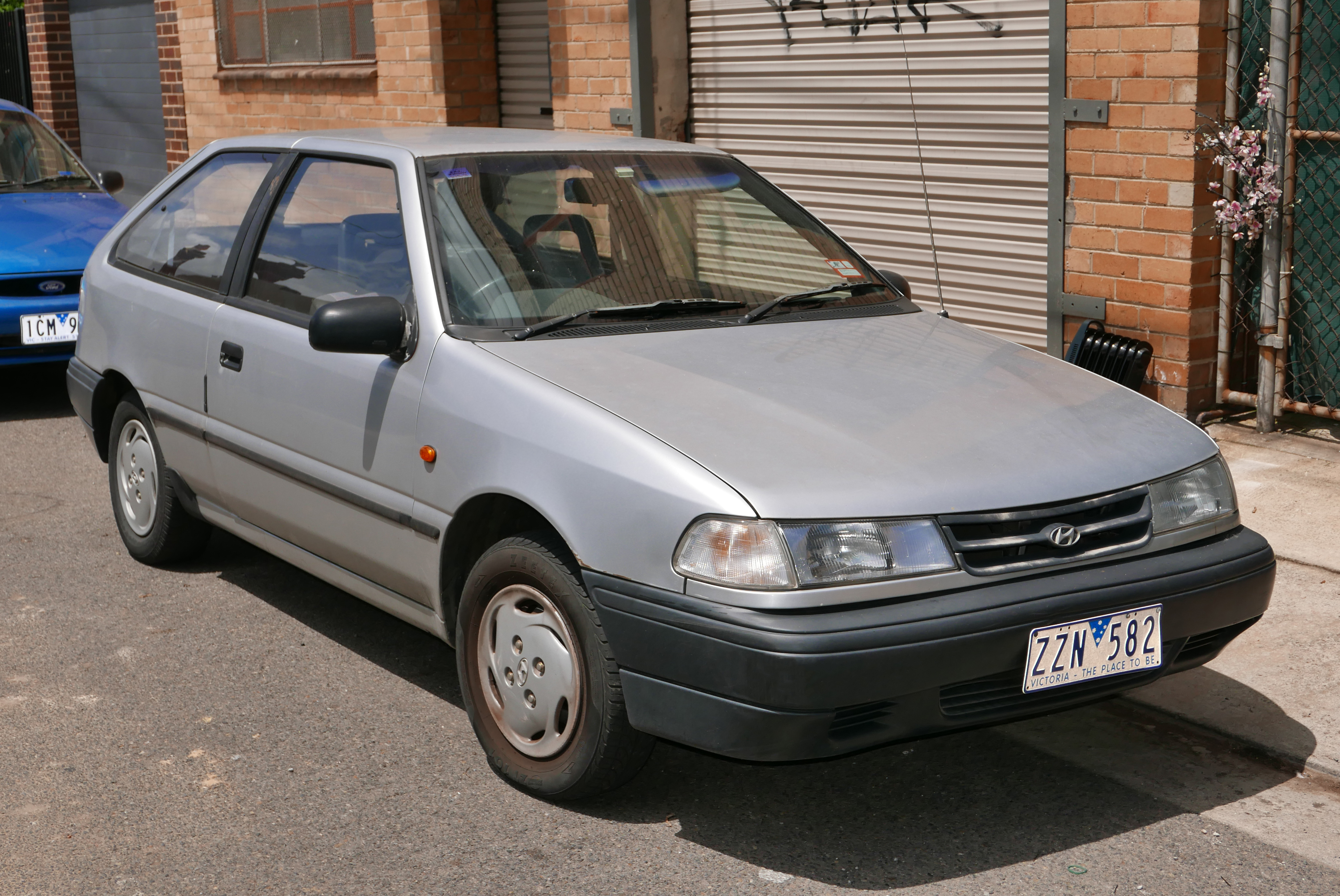
1991–1994 Hyundai Excel (X2) Sprint 3-door hatchback (Australia)

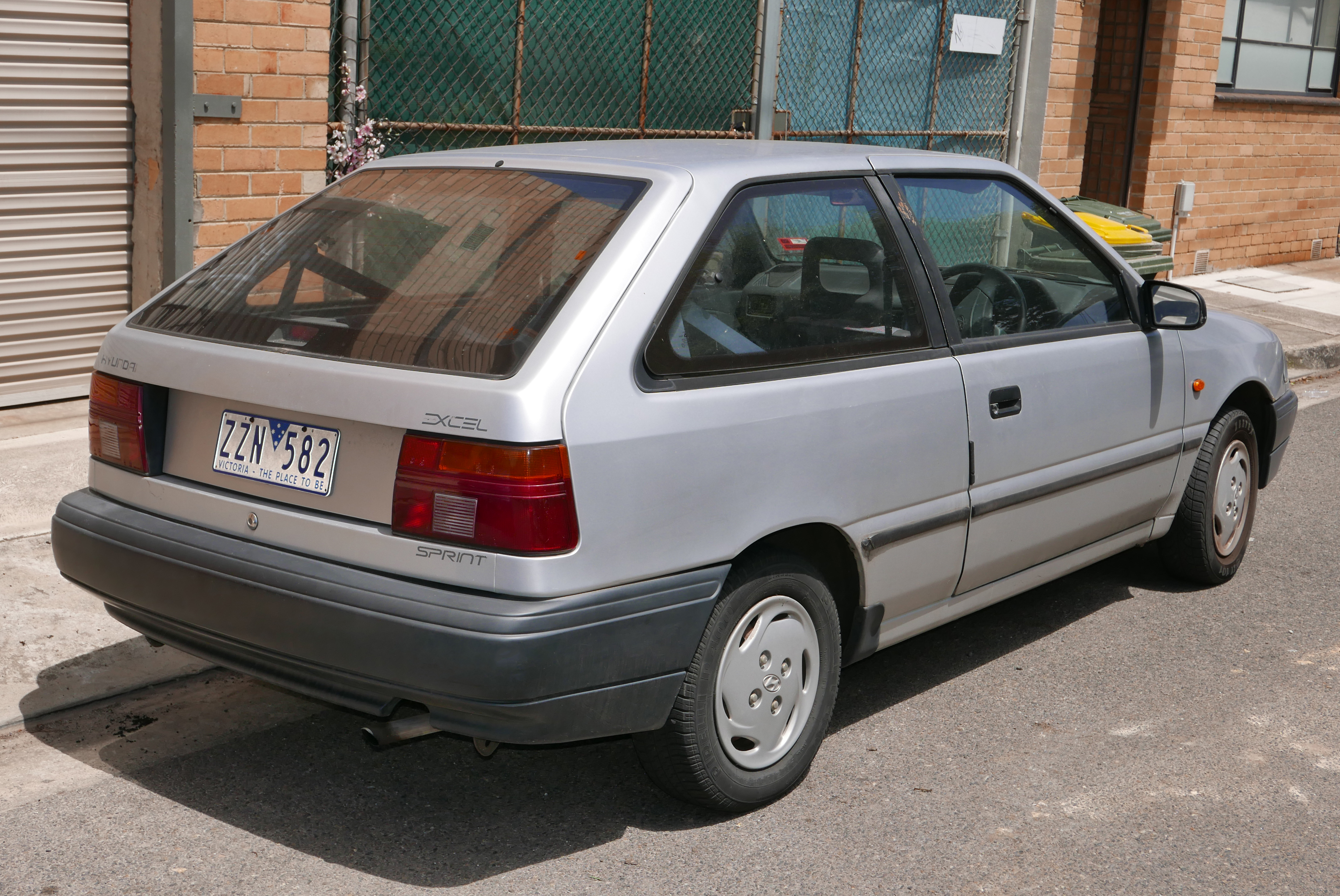
1991–1994 Hyundai Excel (X2) Sprint 3-door hatchback (Australia)

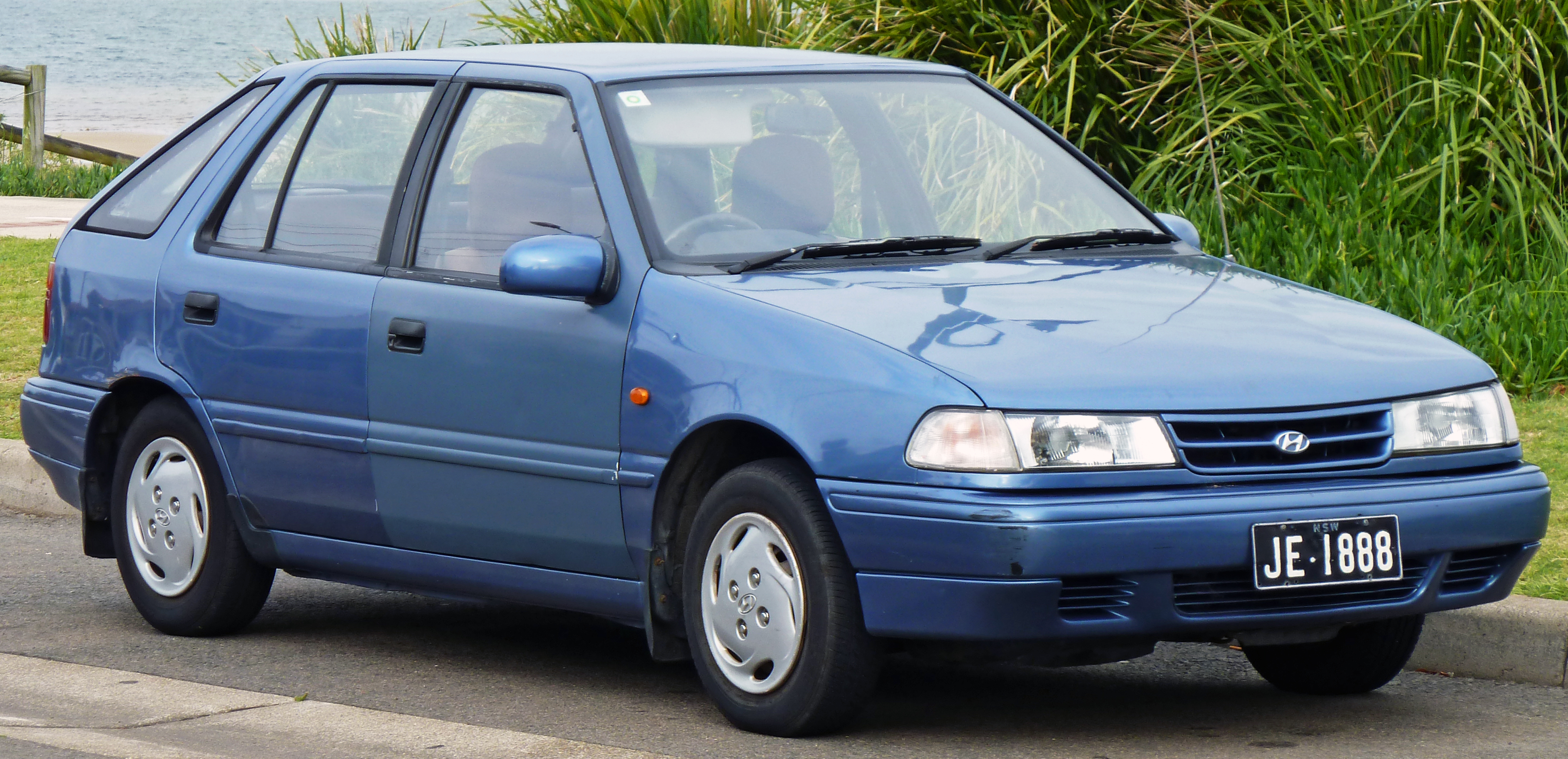
1991–1994 Hyundai Excel (X2) LS 5-door hatchback (Australia)

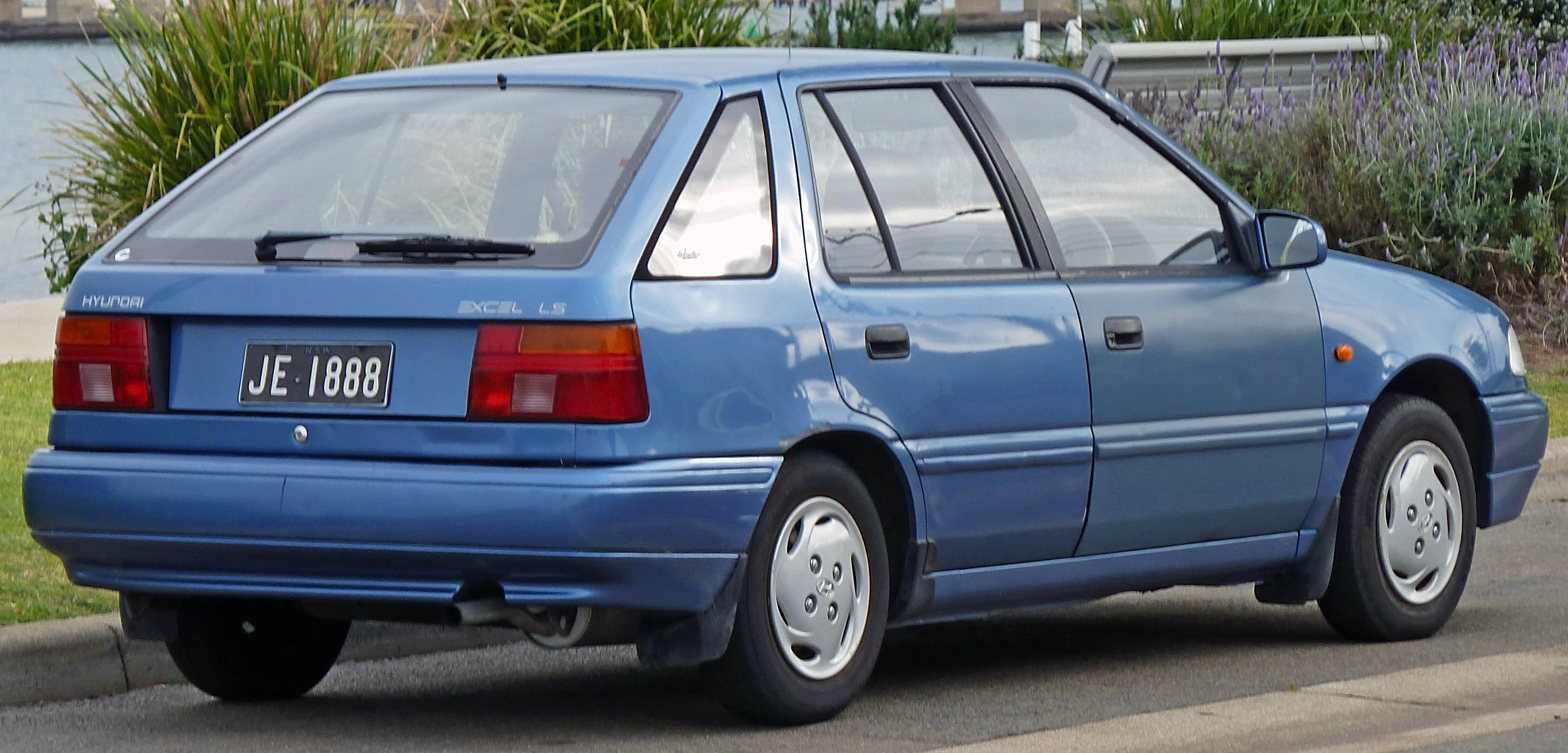
1991–1994 Hyundai Excel (X2) LS 5-door hatchback (Australia)

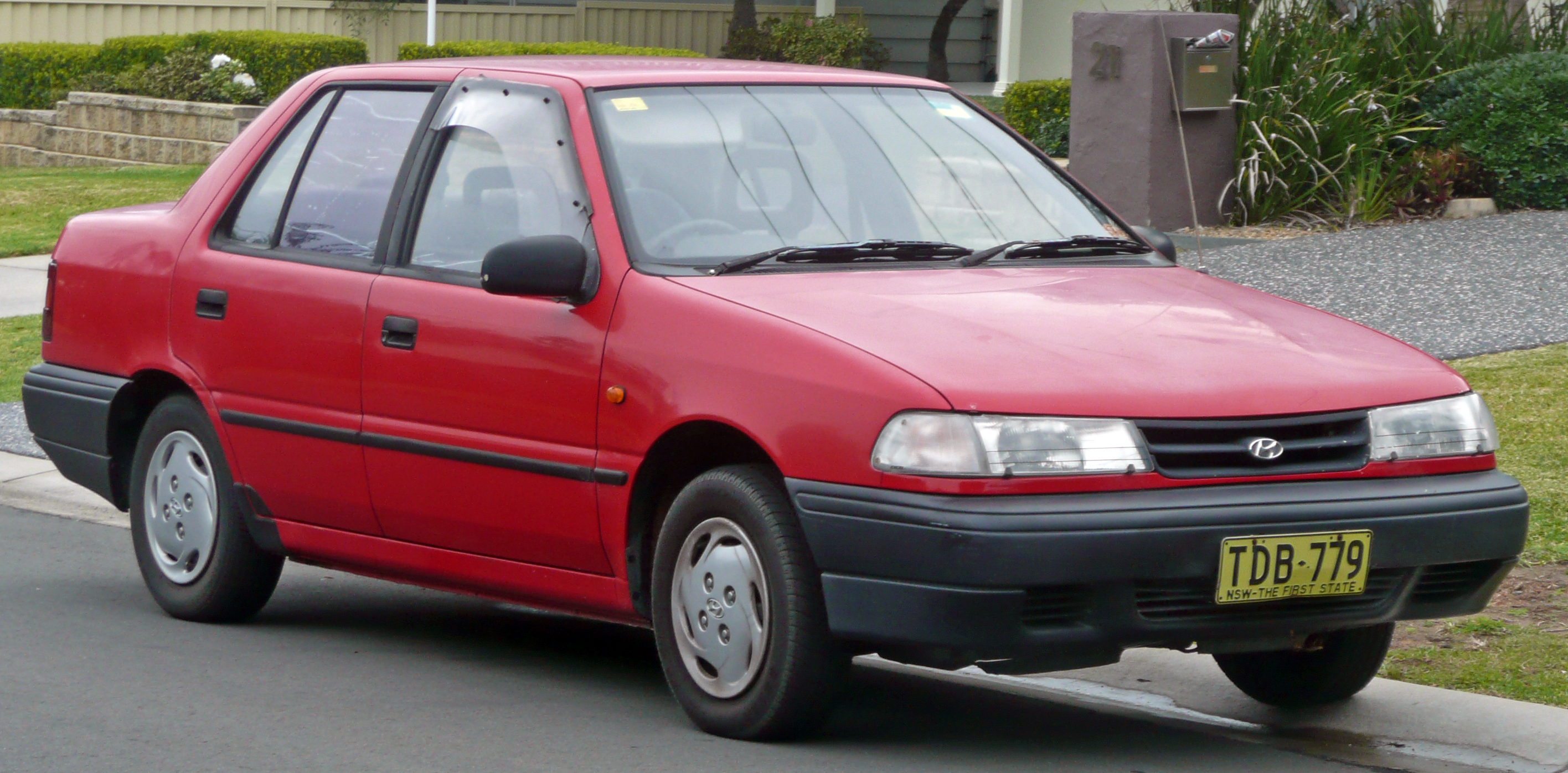
1991–1994 Hyundai Excel (X2) LS sedan (Australia)

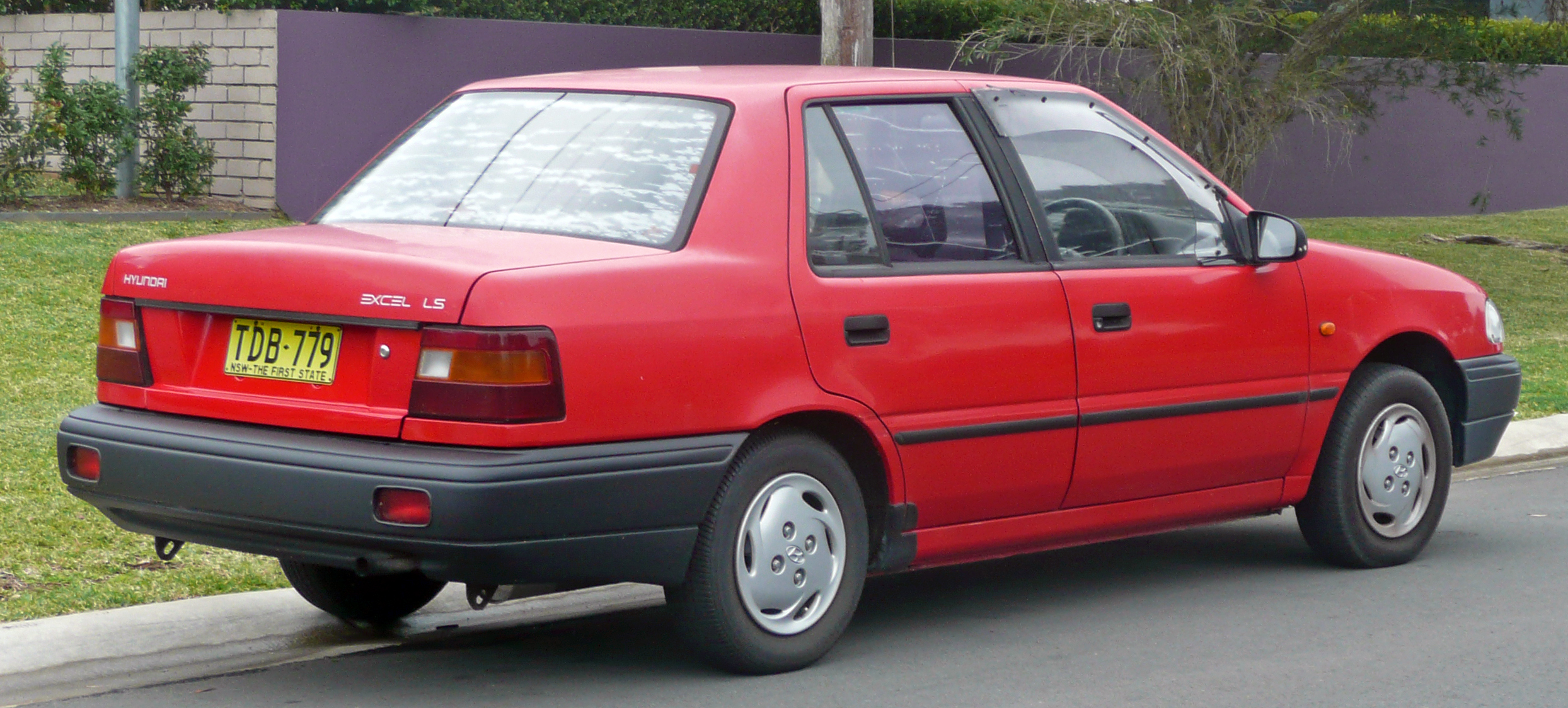
1991–1994 Hyundai Excel (X2) LS sedan (Australia)

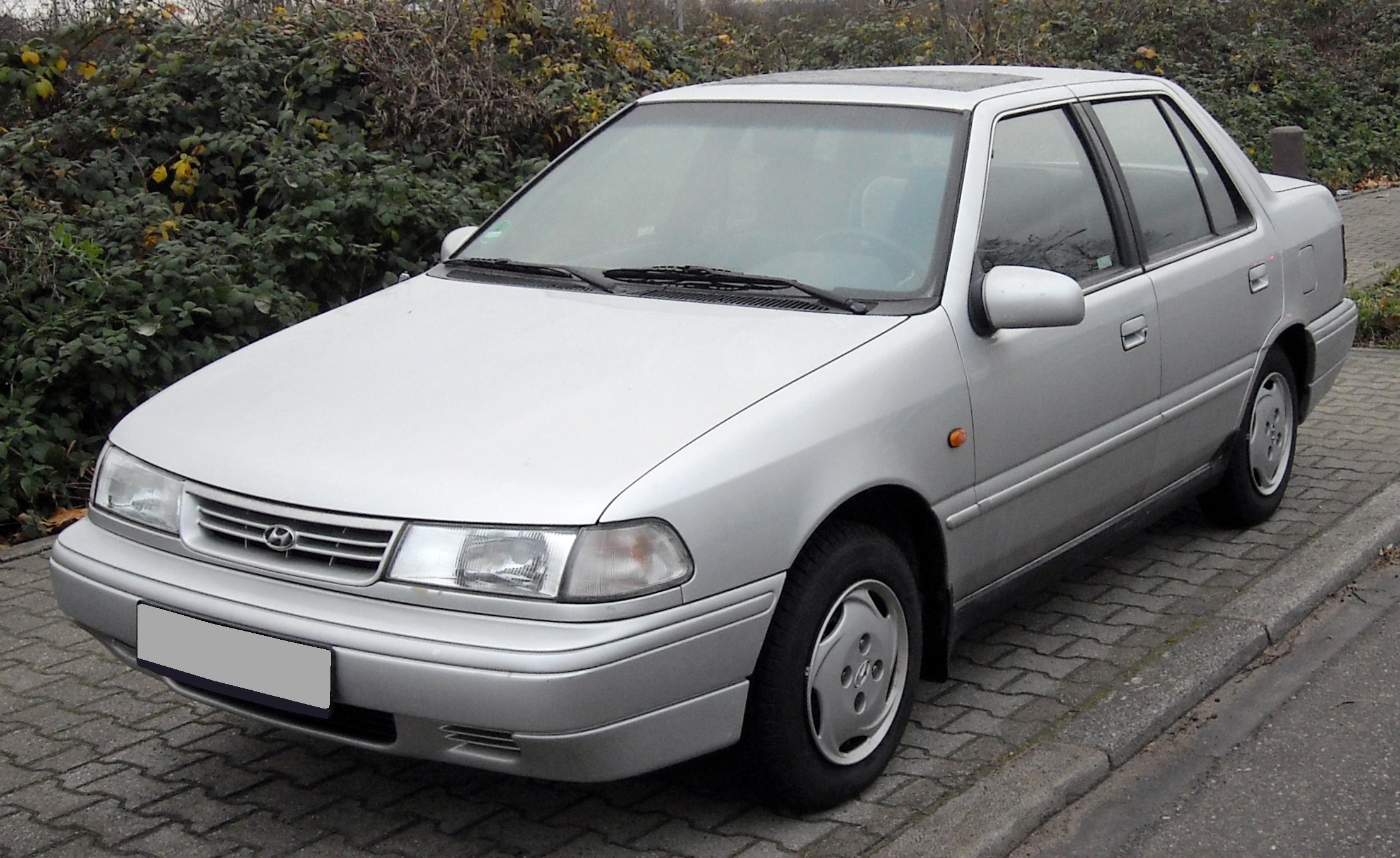
Hyundai Pony GLS sedan (Germany)

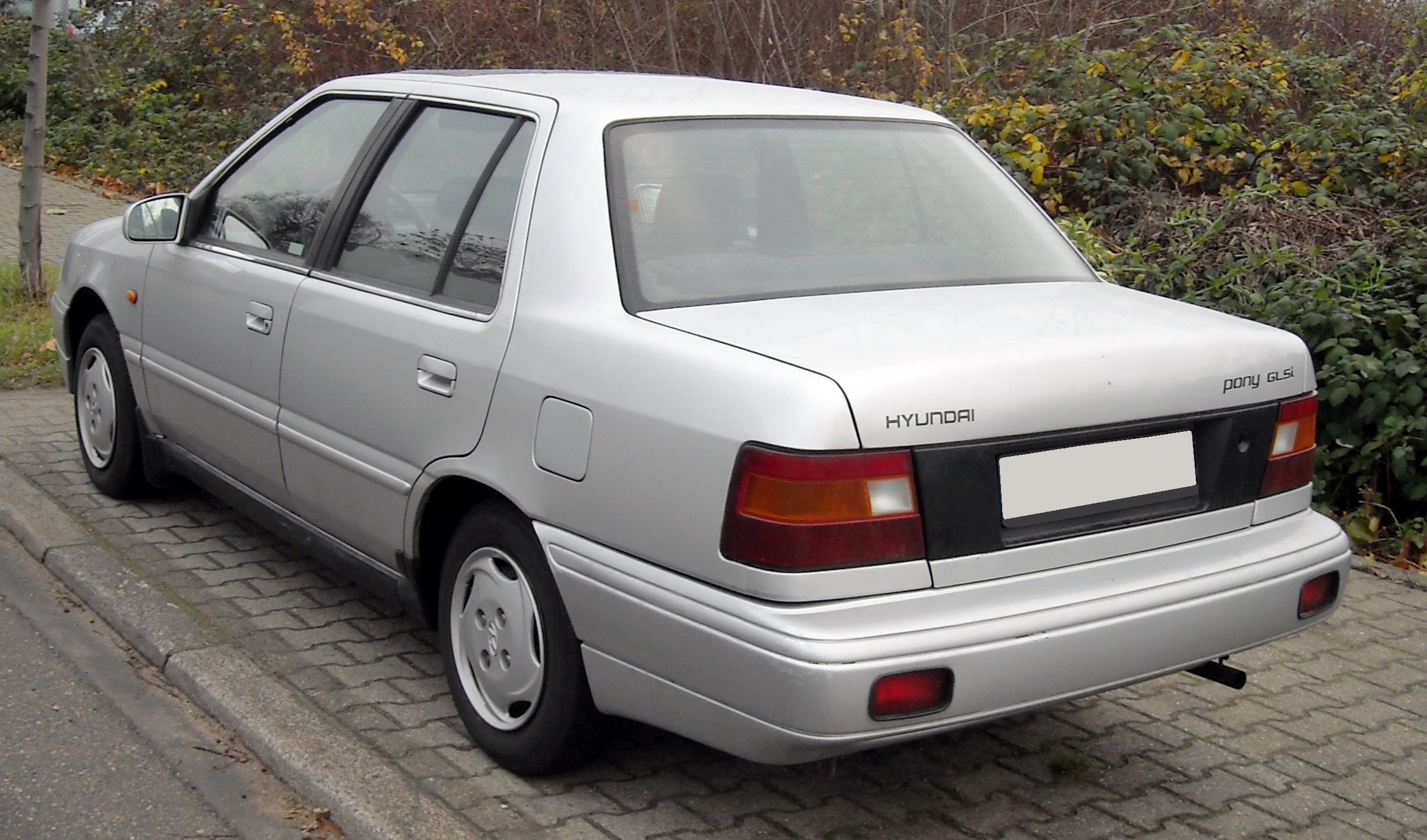
Hyundai Pony GLS sedan (Germany)

=== Markets ===
It was sold in CX, LX and CXL trim levels in South Korea. The South Korean (home market) range was:

- 1.3 CX (3-door hatchback, 5-door hatchback, 4-door sedan)
- 1.3 LX (3-door hatchback, 5-door hatchback, 4-door sedan)
- 1.5 CX (3-door hatchback, 5-door hatchback, 4-door sedan)
- 1.5 LX (5-door hatchback, 4-door saloon)
- 1.5 CXL (5-door hatchback, 4-door saloon).

All models sold in North America had the 1.5-liter engine producing 81 hp (60 kW) and 91 lb⋅ft (123 N⋅m), with automatic transmission as a freestanding option for any model. The lineup available at U.S. Hyundai dealers was;

- Base (3-door hatchback, 4 door sedan)
- GL (3-door hatchback, 4 door sedan, 5 door hatchback in 1990 only)
- GLS (3-door hatchback, 4 door sedan)
- GS (3-door hatchback)

The 5-door model may have been available in Canada for a longer period and in a wider variety of trims. The Mitsubishi Precis came as a 3-door only, in trim levels equivalent to the base and GL Hyundai-branded cars.

Hyundai launched the Excel in Thailand in the early 1990s. The lineup consisted of:

- 1.3 Base (Manual and Automatic)
- 1.3 LS (Manual and Automatic)
- 1.5 LS (Manual)
- 1.5 GLS (Manual and Automatic, with a fuel injected version (GLSi) also available)

The Excel was marketed in Eurasia as the Hyundai Pony or Pony X2 (X2 representing second generation). In the United Kingdom and some parts of Europe, versions available were:

- 1.3 S (3-door hatchback, 5-door hatchback)
- 1.3 Sonnet (3-door hatchback) – replaced 1.3 S base model
- 1.3 LS (3-door hatchback, 5-door hatchback, 4-door sedan)
- 1.5 GSi (5-door hatchback, 4-door sedan)

However, some European markets did not get the 1.3 version and the range was:

- 1.5 L (3-door)
- 1.5 LE (3-door)
- 1.5 GL (3-door hatchback, 5-door hatchback)
- 1.5 LS (3-door hatchback, 5-door hatchback, 4-door sedan)
- 1.5 GS (3-door hatchback, 5-door hatchback, 4-door sedan)
- 1.5 GT (3-door hatchback, 5-door hatchback) – note, not all markets got this version
- 1.5 GLS (3-door hatchback, 5-door hatchback, 4-door sedan)

==== European lineup 1989 ====
The 1989 European Pony and Excel lineup was the most extensive, although not all models were available in any single market.

Pony three-door hatchback:

- LE 4-speed manual
- L 4-speed manual
- L 5-speed manual
- GS 5-speed manual
- GT 5-speed manual
- GT 3-speed automatic
- GTi 5-speed manual
- GTi 4-speed automatic
- GTX 5-speed manual
- GTXi 5-speed manual

Pony five-door hatchback:

- GL, 4-speed manual
- GL, 5-speed manual
- GL, 3-speed automatic
- GLS, 5-speed manual
- GLS, 3-speed automatic

Excel four-door sedan:

- L 4-speed manual
- GL 4-speed manual
- GL 5-speed manual
- GLS 5-speed manual
- SX 5-speed manual
- SLX 5-speed manual
- SLX 3-speed automatic
- SLXi 5-speed manual
- SLXi 4-speed automatic
- SGX 5-speed manual
- SGXi 5-speed manual

==== European lineup 1990 ====
For 1990, the trim levels were reduced and simplified.

- Pony three-door hatchback GL, 4-speed manual
- Pony three-door hatchback GL, 5-speed manual
- Pony three-door hatchback GS, 5-speed manual
- Pony three-door hatchback GS, 3-speed automatic
- Pony five-door hatchback GL, 5-speed manual
- Pony five-door hatchback GLS, 5-speed manual
- Pony five-door hatchback GLS, 3-speed automatic
- Excel four-door sedan GL, 5-speed manual
- Excel four-door sedan GLS, 5-speed manual
- Excel four-door sedan GLS, 3-speed automatic

== Third generation (X3; 1995–1999) ==
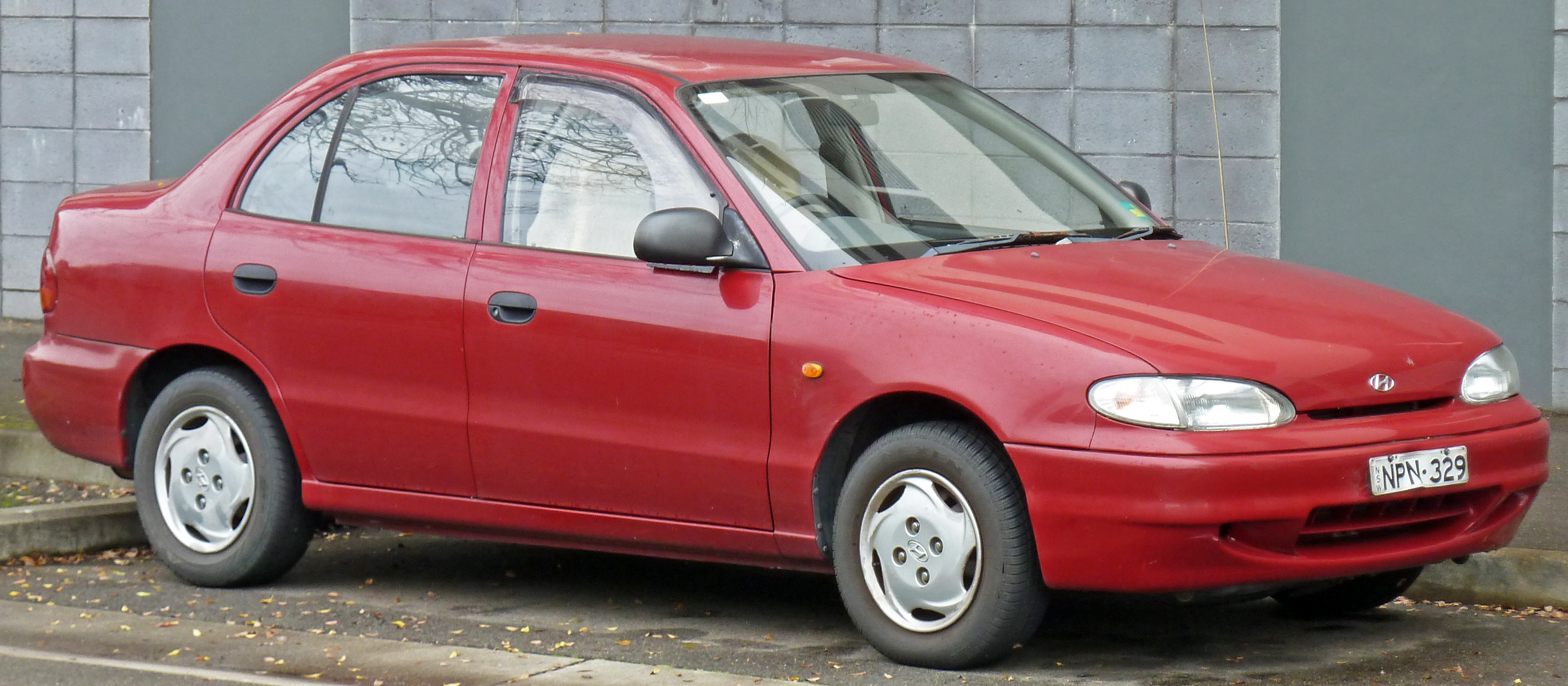
Hyundai Excel (X3)

When the Hyundai Accent was introduced in 1994 for the 1995 model year, it continued to be called Hyundai Excel in some markets, including the Netherlands, Belgium and Australia.

Also in Indonesia, the first, second and fourth generation Hyundai Accent sedans were sold as Excel, Excel II and Excel III. Based on the lowest trim level of each model, they were only sold to taxi companies.
