= Hyundai A engine =

A engine

Overview
- Manufacturer: Hyundai Motor Group
- Production: 2002–present

Layout
- Configuration: Inline-4
- Displacement: 2.5 L (2,497 cc)
- Cylinder bore: 91 mm (3.58 in)
- Piston stroke: 96 mm (3.78 in)
- Cylinder block material: Compacted graphite iron
- Cylinder head material: Aluminum
- Valvetrain: DOHC 4 valves x cyl.

Combustion
- Turbocharger: Variable geometry (A II only); Wastegate (A I only)
- Fuel system: Common rail direct injection
- Management: Bosch with air system-based charge control
- Fuel type: Diesel
- Cooling system: Water-cooled

Output
- Power output: 110–177 PS (81–130 kW; 108–175 hp)
- Torque output: 33–46 kg⋅m (324–451 N⋅m; 239–333 lbf⋅ft)

Emissions
- Emissions target standard: Euro 3; Euro 4; Euro 5; Euro 6

The Hyundai A engine also known by its engine code D4CB is a 2.5 L diesel 4-cylinder automobile engine produced by Hyundai Motor Group from 2002 up to the present. This is one of the first diesel engines designed and developed solely by Hyundai without any license from any other car manufacturer.

The A line of engines feature four cylinders compacted graphite iron block and aluminum cylinder head unit, with chain driven dual overhead camshafts operating four valves per cylinder. Fuel is supplied to the unit using Bosch 2nd-generation common rail direct injection (CRDi) through piezoelectric injectors operating at 1,360 bar (19,700 psi) for the A I series while it was increased to 1,600 bar (23,000 psi) for the A II series with the latter having been equipped with a Variable Geometry Turbocharger (VGT) with some models having a Wastegate (WGT) instead. Accesorios belt 7pk2268

As the older A models were rated below their intended Euro rating (A I series rated for Euro 3 is taxed for Euro 2, while earlier A II series rated for Euro 4 is taxed for Euro 3), to achieve the intended Euro 5 emission and taxation compliancy, the later A II series from 2011-onwards is fitted with a standard Diesel particulate filter to meet the intended emissions standards.

== A I series ==
The 2.5 L (2,497 cc) A I was produced from 2002 through 2006. Typical output is 104 kW (142 PS) at 3800 rpm. Bore and stroke is 91 mm × 96 mm (3.58 in × 3.78 in). It was available with either 4-speed automatic or 5-speed manual transmissions.

Applications

- Hyundai Starex (2002–2006)
- Hyundai Porter (2006–2012)
- Kia Sorento (2002–2008)
- Kia Bongo (2006–2012)

== A II series ==
The 2.5 L (2,497 cc) A II is produced since 2007. Cylinder bore and stroke is 91 mm × 96 mm (3.58 in × 3.78 in). This series saw the introduction of a variable geometry turbocharger as an improvement from the initial traditional turbocharger of the A I while some later models shifted to a wastegate instead for some markets.

Sometime in 2008 through 2021 some engines are designated as D4CB-L A II which was a low-power version that is rated only for 122 kW (165 PS) instead of the usual 127 kW (172 PS). 2011 models and beyond are also equipped with a standard particulate filter for emission compliance purposes.

Applications

- Hyundai Starex (2007–2021)
- Hyundai H350 (2014–present)
- Hyundai Porter (2013–present)
- Kia Sorento (2006–2008)
- Kia Bongo (2013–present)

=== Specifications ===
Code	PS	kW	hp	at rpm	kgm	Nm	lb·ft	at rpm	Compr. ratio	Notes
D4CB	138	101	136	3800	35.9	352	260	2500	17.6:1	2008–2009 (Euro 4)
D4CB	112	82	110	3800	35	343	253	2500	16.4:1	2010 (Euro 4)
D4CB	120	88	118	3800	35	343	253	2500	16.4:1	2011–2017 (Euro 4)
D4CB	172	127	170	3800	35	343	253	2500	17.7:1	2011–2017 (Euro 5)
D4CB	138	101	136	3600	45	441	325	2500	16.4:1	2018–2021 (Euro 4)
D4CB	172	127	170	3600	45	441	325	2250	17.7:1	2018–present (Euro 5)
D4CB	177	130	175	3600	46	451	333	2000–2250	17.7:1	2018–present (Euro 6)
D4CB-L	165	121	163	3800	40	392	289	2000–2500	17.6:1	Low power version

== See also ==
- List of Hyundai engines
