= Hyundai Starex =

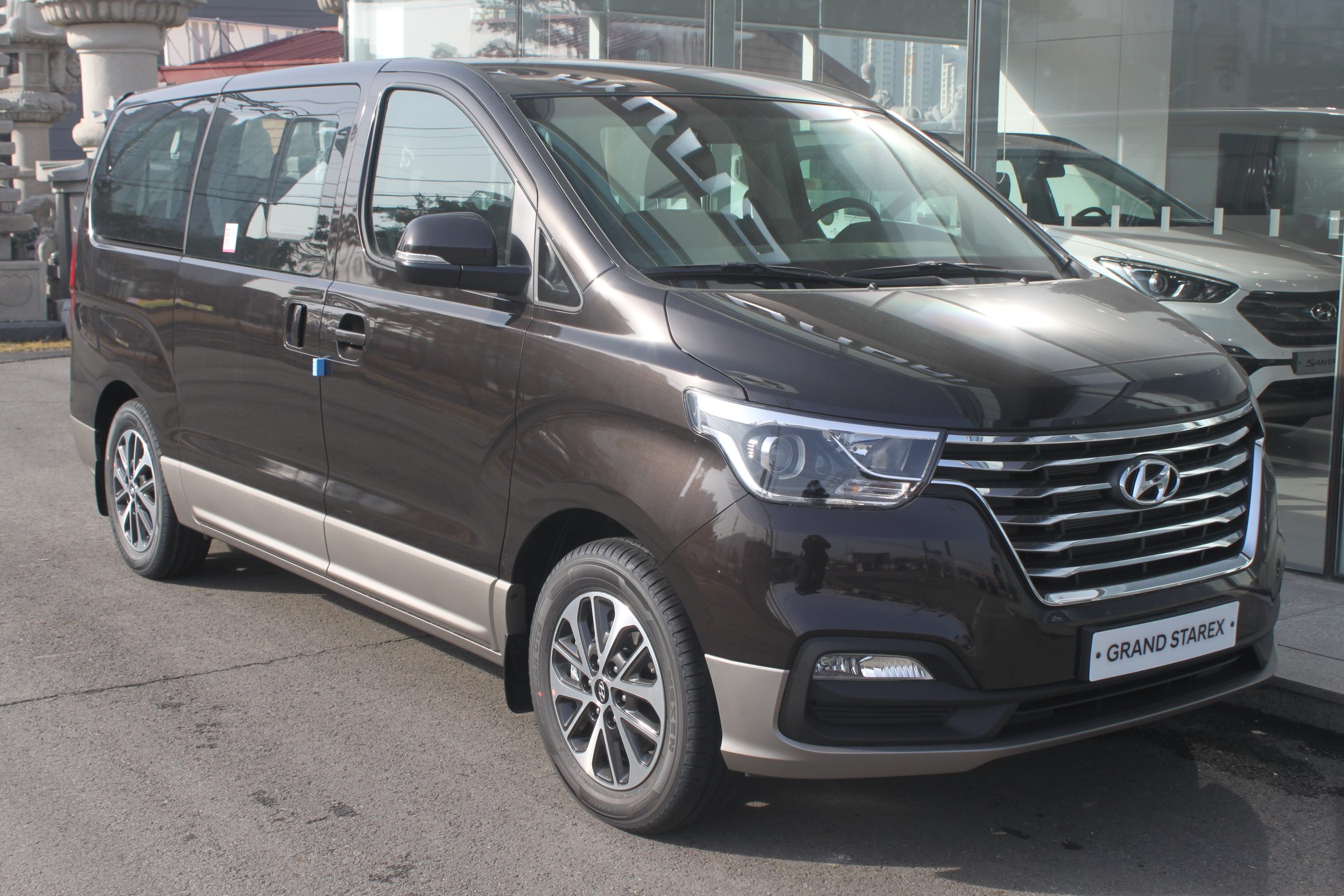

Overview
- Manufacturer: Hyundai
- Also called: Hyundai H-1
- Production: 1996 – March 2021 (South Korea); 1996–2023 (international)
- Assembly: South Korea: Ulsan (Plant 4); Egypt: Cairo (Ghabbour Group); Algeria: Tiaret (TMC Group); Indonesia: Bekasi (HIM); Turkey: Izmit (Hyundai Assan Otomotiv)

Body and chassis
- Class: Light commercial vehicle (M): Minivan; Panel van; Compact truck (Libero)
- Body style: 4-door van 4-door minibus 2-door pickup (Libero)
- Layout: Front-engine, rear-wheel-drive Front-engine, four-wheel-drive

Chronology
- Predecessor: Hyundai Grace (Mitsubishi Motors)
- Successor: Hyundai Staria; Hyundai Solati H350 (Mexico); Hyundai ST1 (Libero)

The Hyundai Starex (Korean: 현대 스타렉스) is a series of light commercial vehicles built by Hyundai, produced from 1996 to 2023.

The first-generation models were known in Europe as Hyundai H-1, and in the Netherlands as Hyundai H200. The cargo variant of the second-generation models was marketed as the Hyundai iLoad in both Australia and the United Kingdom, and the second-generation passenger variant was marketed as the Hyundai iMax in Australia, but as the Hyundai i800 in the United Kingdom. In Europe, the cargo variant was marketed as the Hyundai H-1 Cargo, while the passenger variant was marketed as the Hyundai H-1 Travel. In the Netherlands, it is called the Hyundai H300. In Malaysia, the passenger variant of the H300 is only sold as a luxurious MPV variant marketed as the Hyundai Grand Starex in an 11-seater configuration.

== First generation (A1; 1996) ==
First generation (A1)
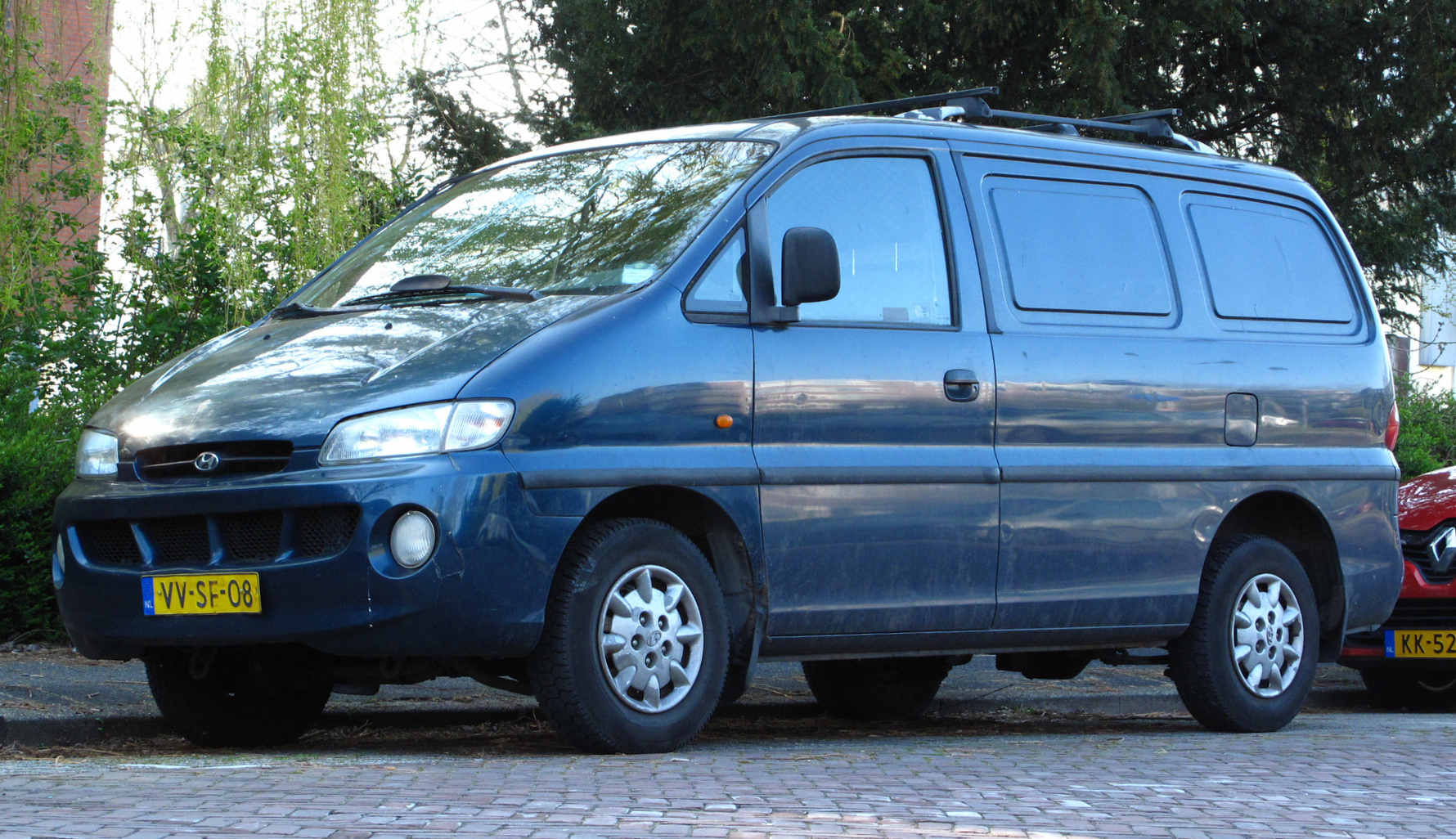
- Pre-facelift

Overview
- Also called: Hyundai H-1; Hyundai H200/H300; Hyundai Libero (pickup); Hyundai Satellite; JAC Ruifeng (JAC Refine); Pyeonghwa Samcheonri 0713 (North Korea)
- Production: 1996–2007; 2002–2015 (China)

Body and chassis
- Body style: 4-door van 4-door minibus 2-door pickup (Libero)
- Related: Mitsubishi Delica; Hyundai Porter; JAC Refine M5

Powertrain
- Engine: Petrol: 2.4 L Sirius I4; 3.0 L Sigma V6; Petrol/LPG: 2.4 L Sirius I4; 3.0 L Sigma V6; Diesel: 2.5 L D4BF/D4BH I4; 2.5 L A CRDI I4; 2.6 L D4BB I4; China (petrol): 1.8 L I4; 2.0 L HFC4GA3 I4; 2.0 L HFC4GA3-1C turbo I4; 2.4 L HFC4GA1-C I4; China (diesel): 1.8 L HFC4DB3-2C turbo I4; 1.9 L HFC4DB1-2C turbo I4; 2.8 L HFC4DA1-2B1 turbo I4
- Transmission: 6-speed manual 5-speed manual 4-speed automatic

Dimensions
- Wheelbase: RV Wagon/Van: 2,810 mm (110.6 in); Jumbo Wagon/Van: 3,080 mm (121.3 in)
- Length: 4,695–5,090 mm (184.8–200.4 in)

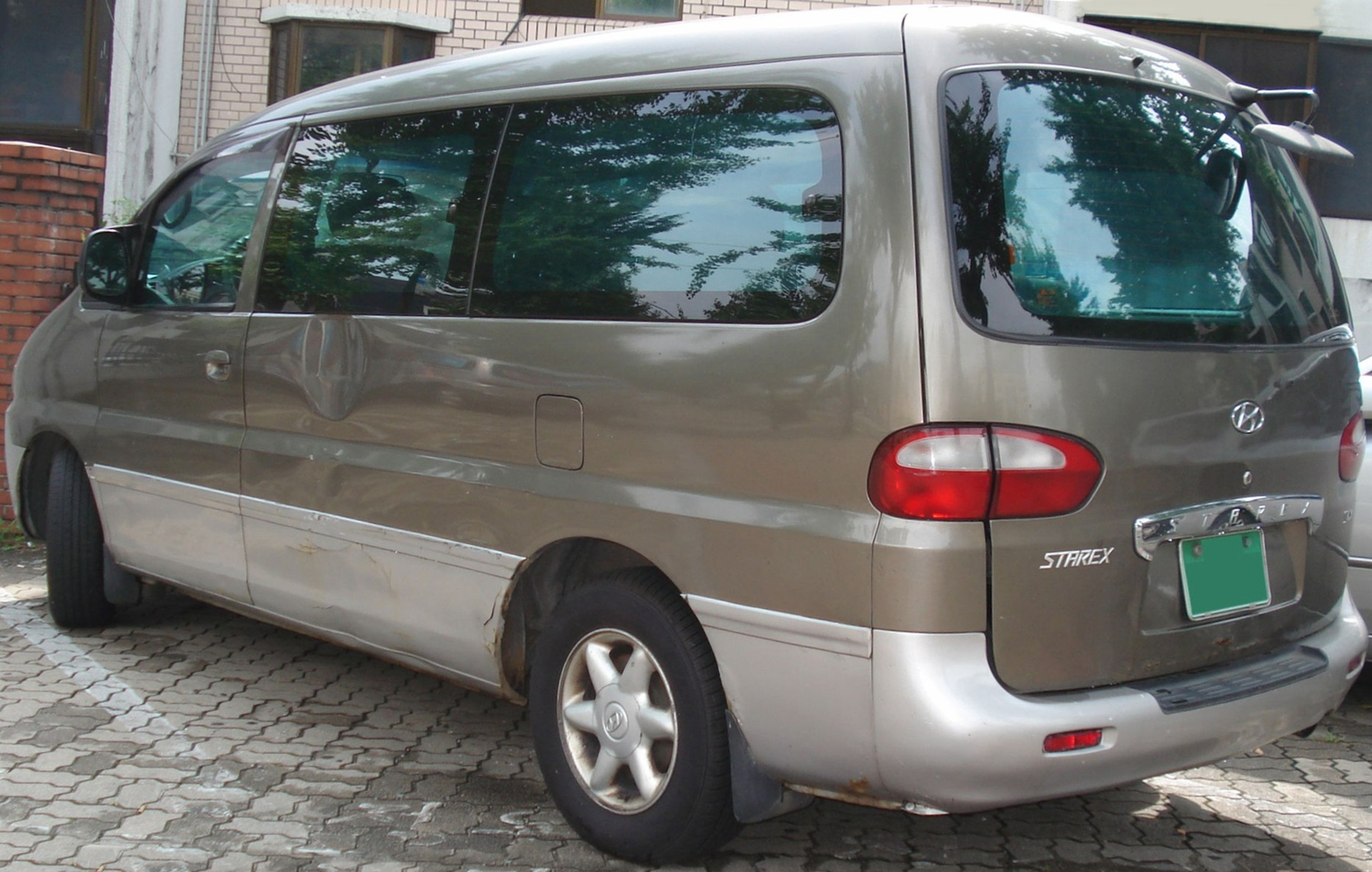
Rear view (pre-facelift)

The Starex succeeded the Hyundai Grace (also known as the H100) in most countries. Like the Hyundai Grace, the first generation A1-series Starex was available in a wide range of configurations, including minivan/MPV, minibus, van, pick-up, taxi and ambulance. For the very first 1996 models, the Starex used the derived 2.5-liter 4D56 SOHC 8-valve naturally aspirated diesel engine with 55 kW (75 PS) and 142 N⋅m (105 lb⋅ft) at 2500 rpm. These first-generation models were initially restricted for sale to the domestic South Korean market, but were eventually exported to a number of countries in Southeast Asia and some parts of Europe.

For the 1998 model, a gasoline engine was offered, a Mitsubishi derived 4G64 108 kW (147 PS) at 5250 rpm with 218 N⋅m (161 lb⋅ft) of torque, at 4000 rpm. The diesel engine now comes with a slightly more powerful Mitsubishi-derived 4D56 non-intercooled turbo diesel engine with 62 kW (84 PS), at 201 N⋅m (148 lb⋅ft), at 2000 rpm. It was available in two trim levels, SVX and Club, and several body styles (Commercial Panel Van and Pick-Up Truck (Libero)). A 12-seater long-wheelbase "Jumbo" and a seven- and nine-seater short-wheelbase "RV" were also available. First introduced to this model were luxurious features like side lower body cladding with two-tone paint scheme (SVX, Club), optional dual-sunroof (Club), side body "Tetris style" decals (Club), chrome slant grills, rear tailgate handle opener cover (Club), cream moquette upholstery (Club), optional high-tech head unit with television screen and six-disc CD changer (Club) for domestic models, power windows and antenna (SVX, Club). Also included were differently styled "star" 15-inch alloy wheels with exposed lug nuts (Club) and an Aisin Seiki Co. sourced four-speed automatic transmission with electronically controlled transmission (ECT) and overdrive switch. For safety, it also features limited-slip differential (LSD), anti-lock braking system (ABS) and driver side airbag.

This model was exported to several countries and proved successful in some car markets like the Philippines, where, at that time, the vehicle was imported via gray market. Its main advantage was being priced lower than its twin, the Mitsubishi Space Gear, even though it contained more features. In the following year, the gasoline engine version was dropped in the Philippines due to unusually high gasoline consumption, but was still made available for other markets.

For the 1999 model, it gained the more powerful 2.5-liter SOHC 8-valve turbo-diesel, inter-cooled engine that has an output of 63 kW (86 PS) at 4000 rpm and 170 N⋅m (130 lb⋅ft) of torque, most notable feature is the addition of a hood scoop for the intercooler feed, different upholstery color scheme, blacked-out B-pillars (Club) and a top dashboard center binnacle with temperature, altimeter and a compass for 4x2 and 4x4 Club variant.

=== First facelift ===
The 2000 to 2002 model version, also known as the "millennium" model, retains the previous engine specs while it made available for its domestic market, a Mitsubishi derived 2,972 cc 6G72 V6 gas engine with 145 kW (197 PS) at 5000 rpm and 278 N⋅m (205 lb⋅ft) of torque at 4000 rpm. This model features updated exterior and interior trims for the SVX and Club models, with features such as multi-reflectorized clear headlamps and jewel-like treatment for the tail-lights, differently styled front bumper over-riders, front door "SVX" decals, black and gray interior color scheme with more durable upholstery material, and differently styled alloy wheels for the SVX and Club models.

For the 2003 to 2004 model, a more powerful power plant was made available, a new 2.5-liter DOHC 16-valve common rail direct injection turbo-diesel engine that had an output of 104 kW (141 PS) and 360 N⋅m (270 lb⋅ft) of torque. It retained the previous model's interior and exterior styling features and received a new digital climate control for the higher Club model.

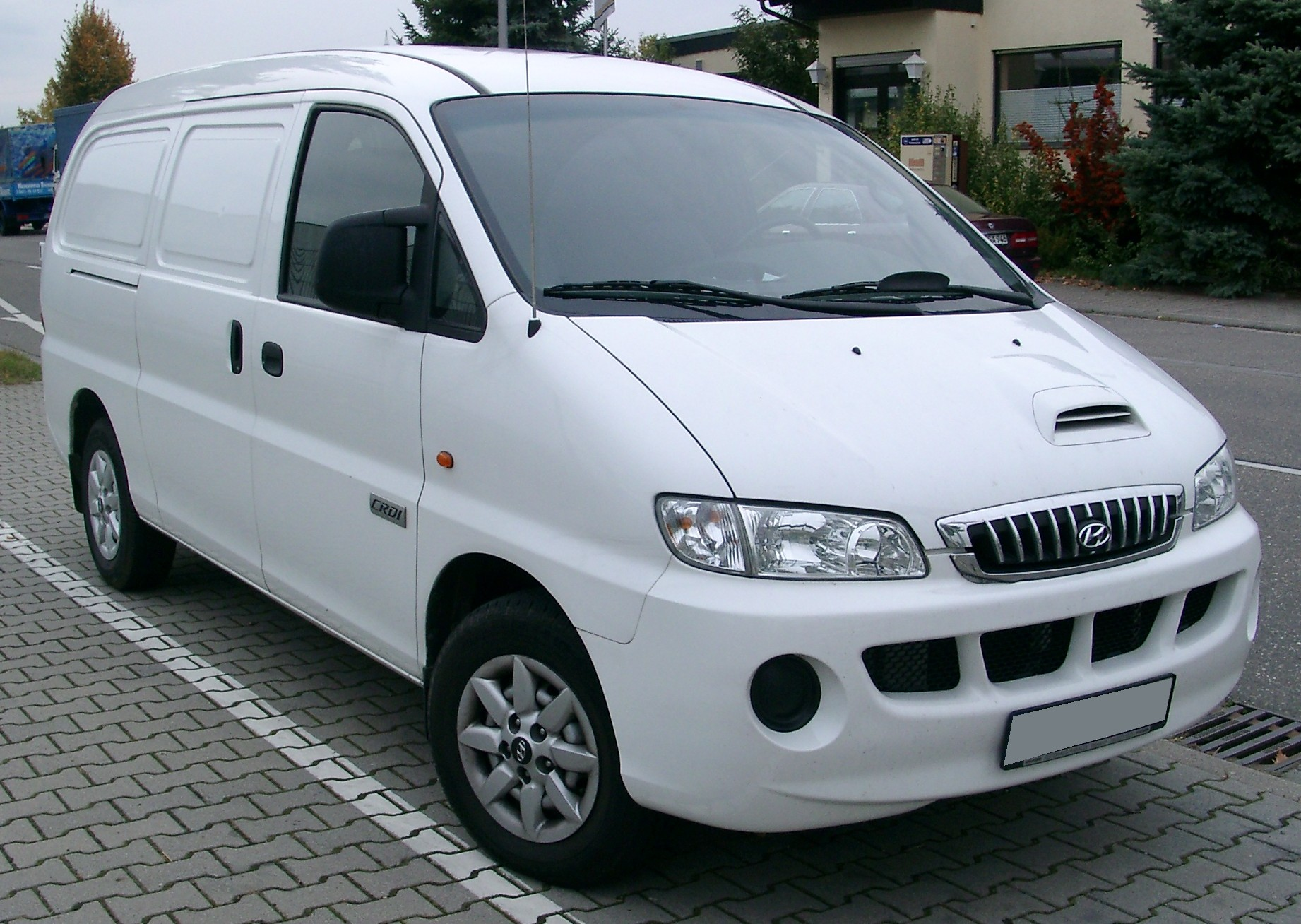
Hyundai H-1 van front (first facelift)

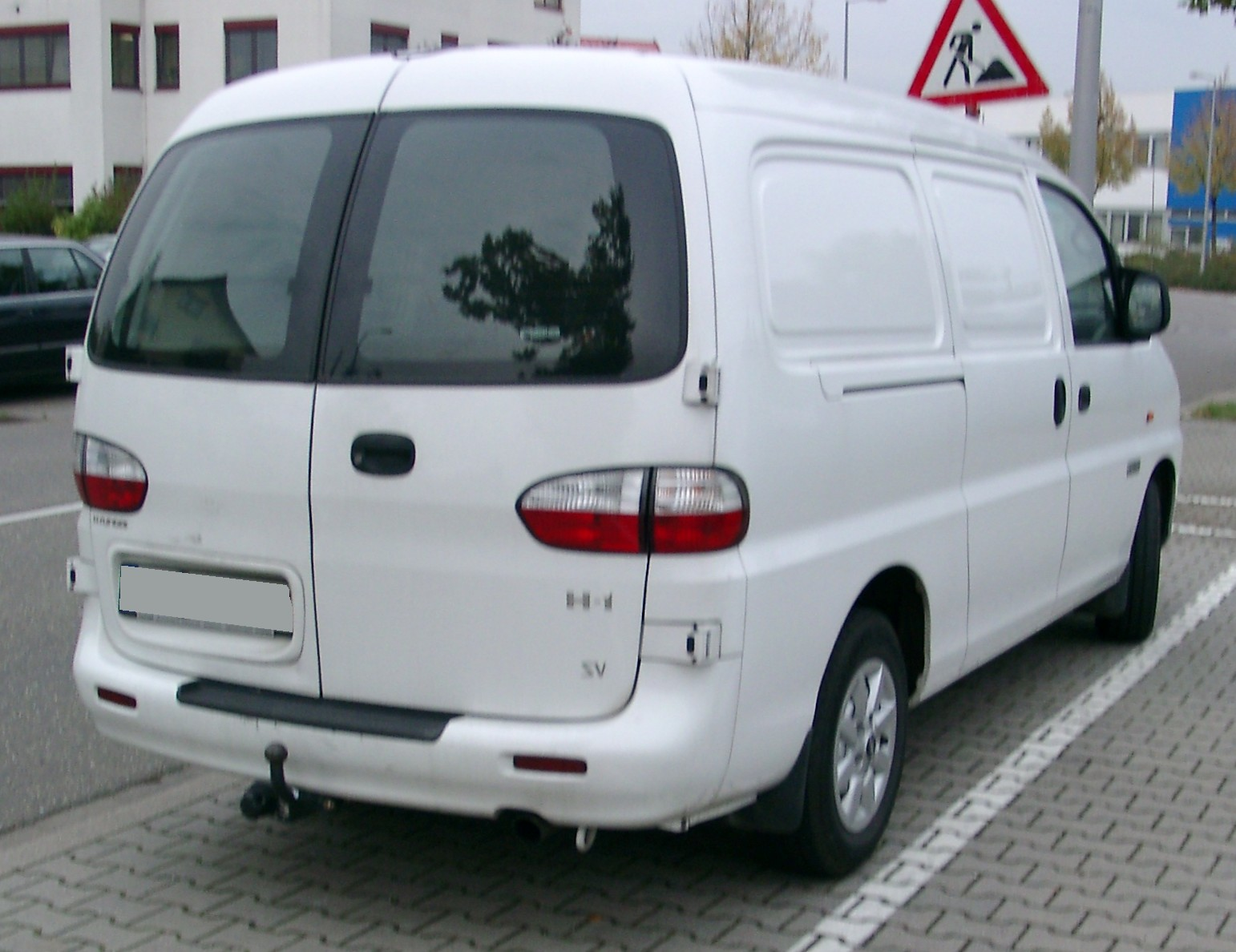
Hyundai H-1 van rear (first facelift)

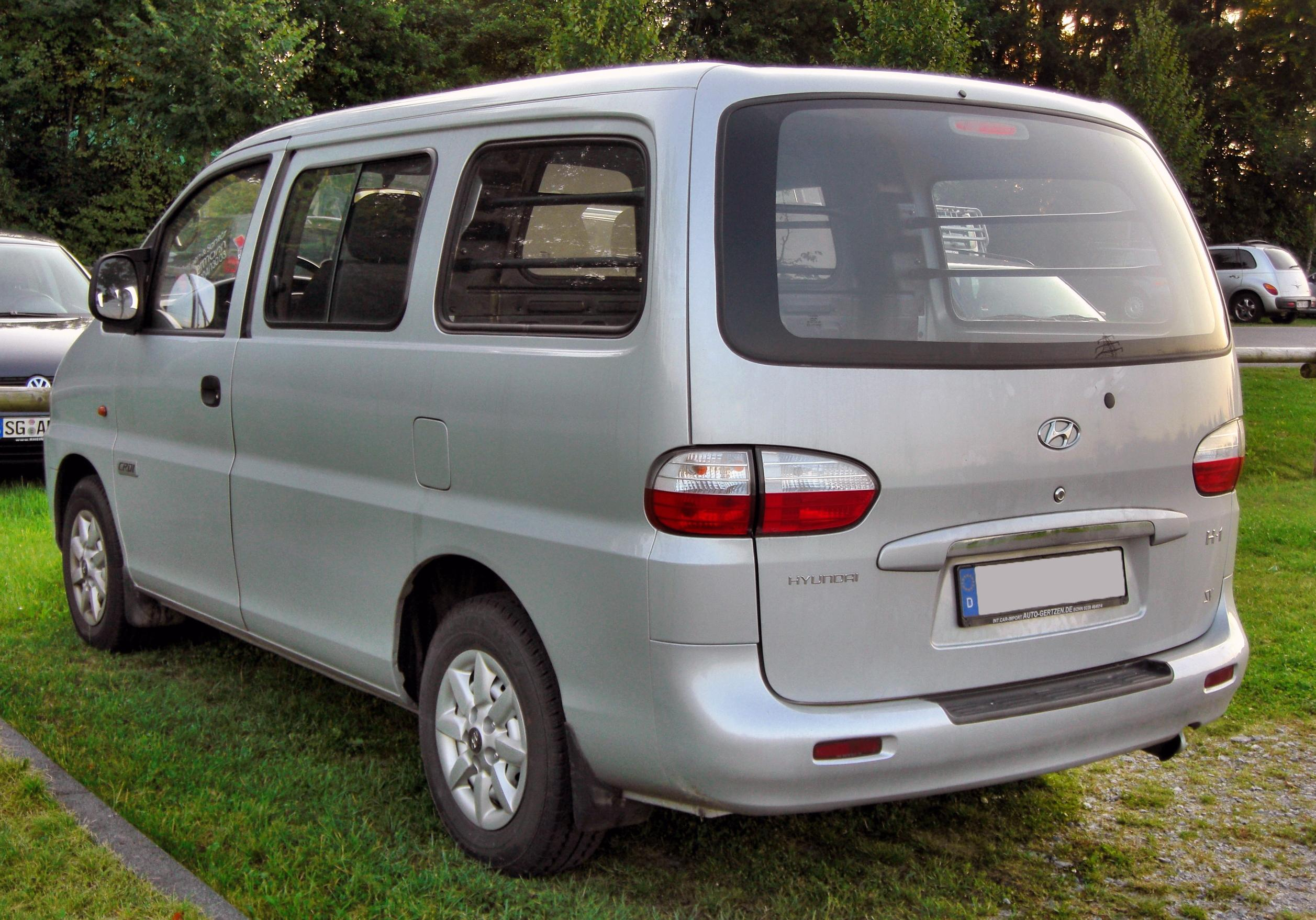
Hyundai H-1 MPV/Minibus rear (first facelift)

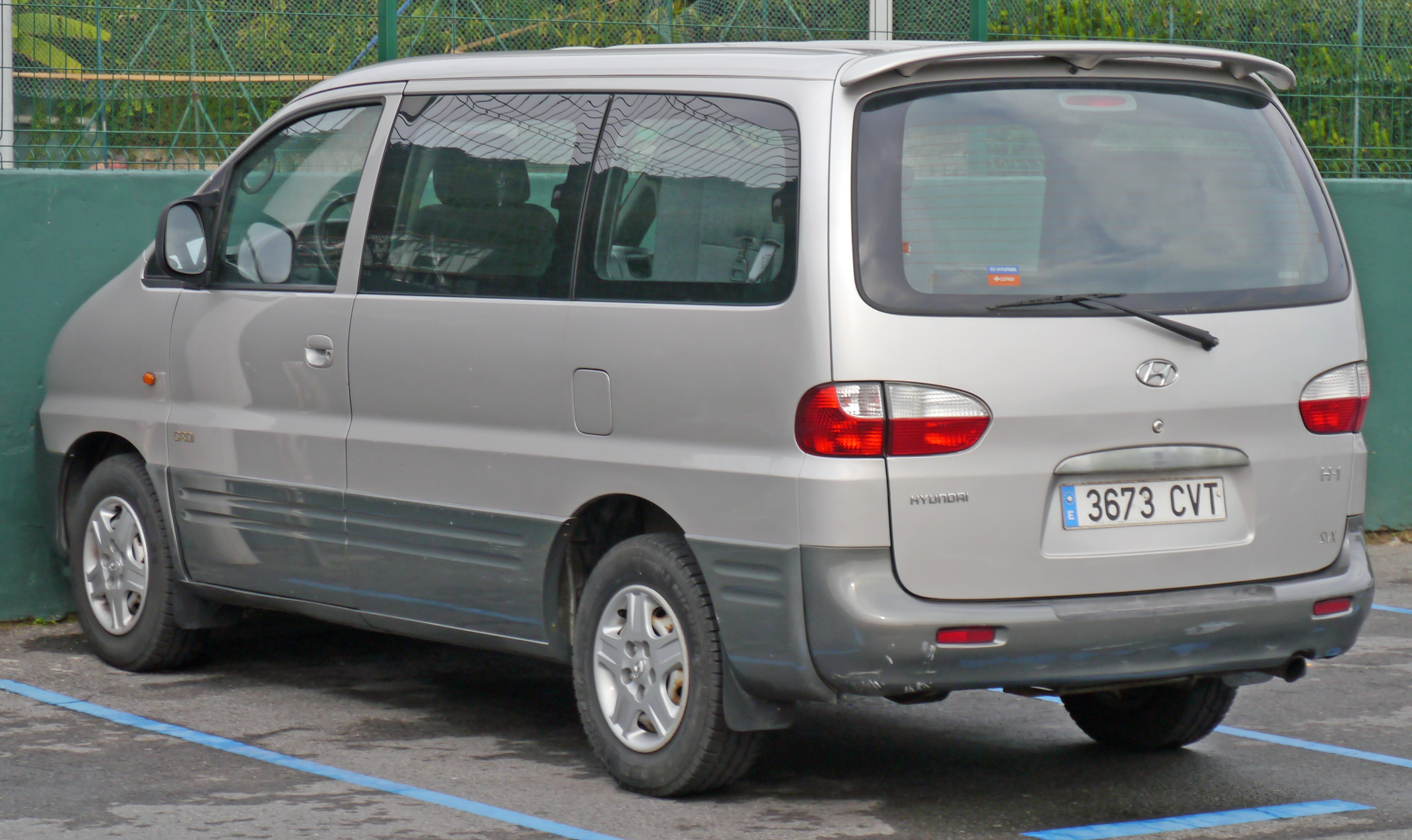
Hyundai H-1 SVX rear (first facelift)

=== Second facelift ===
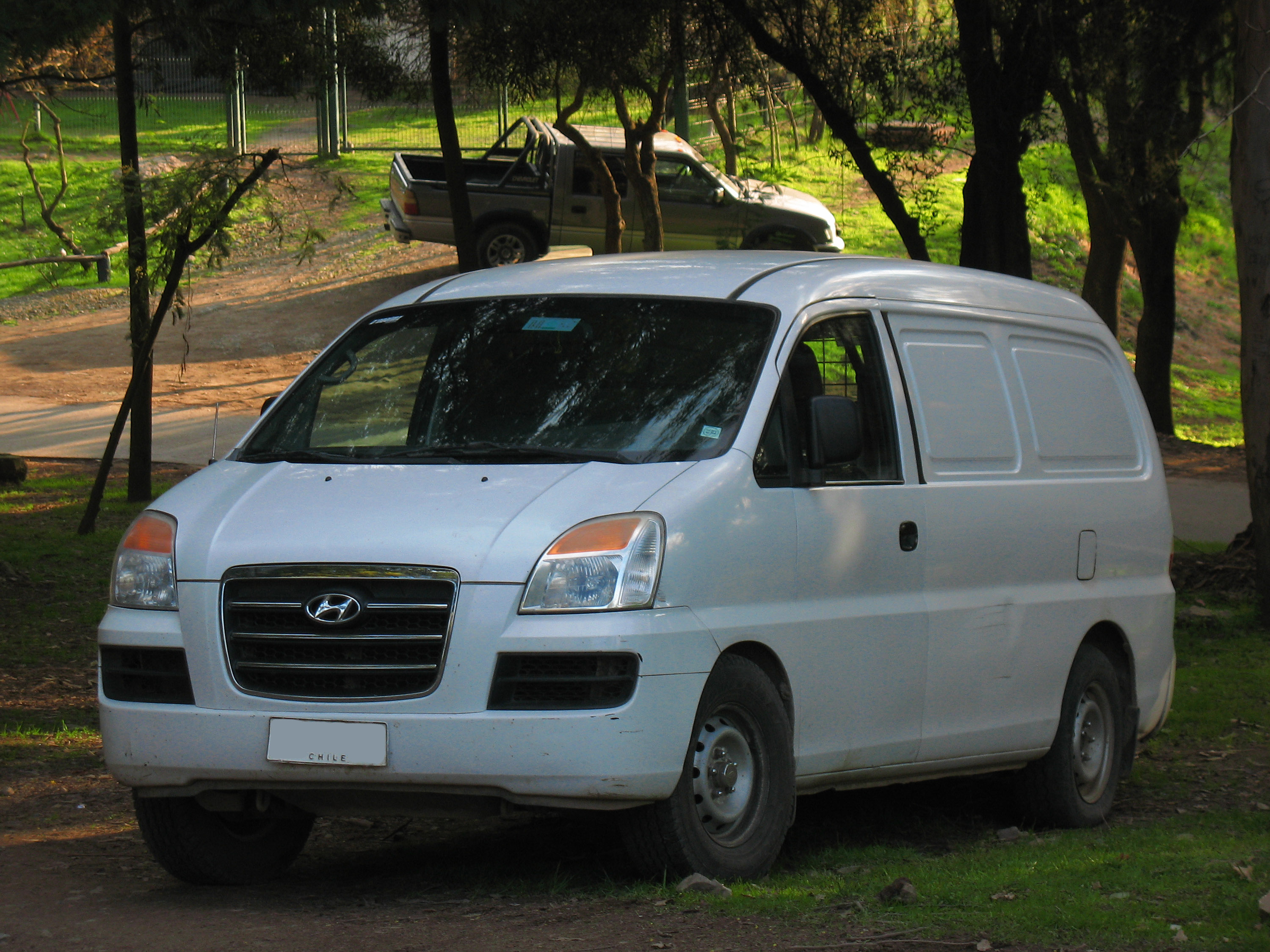
2007 Hyundai H-1 SV Cargo (second facelift)

The 2005 to 2007 model offered much more with a new front fascia, with features such as squared "bug" eye headlights, an extended bumper to accommodate the oversized square radiator grills with three vertical chrome bars, and squared fog lamps. Also new were differently finished rear tail-lights and bumpers, integrated radio antenna, digital odometer and trip meter, and (depending on the market) an updated multimedia head unit with flip-down ceiling-mounted screen. The engine was a Sirius 2.4-litre DOHC 16-valve MPi engine that had an output of 107 kW (143 hp) at 192 N⋅m (142 lb⋅ft) of torque, carry-over 2.5-liter DOHC 16-valve common rail direct injection turbo-diesel engine that had an output of 104 kW (141 PS) at 360 N⋅m (270 lb⋅ft) of torque and a 2.5-liter SOHC eight-valve turbo-diesel with intercooler engine that has an output of 63 kW (86 PS) at 4000 rpm and 170 N⋅m (130 lb⋅ft) of torque but now with ETC. The interior includes upgraded upholstery, back seat cup holders, and an rubberized floor matting. Other standard features include aluminum accents, split, folding seats, all power features, digital climate control, keyless entry, and a DVD player with six speakers. The Gold models featured a leather interior, an overhead console, and an immobilizer.

=== Hyundai Libero ===
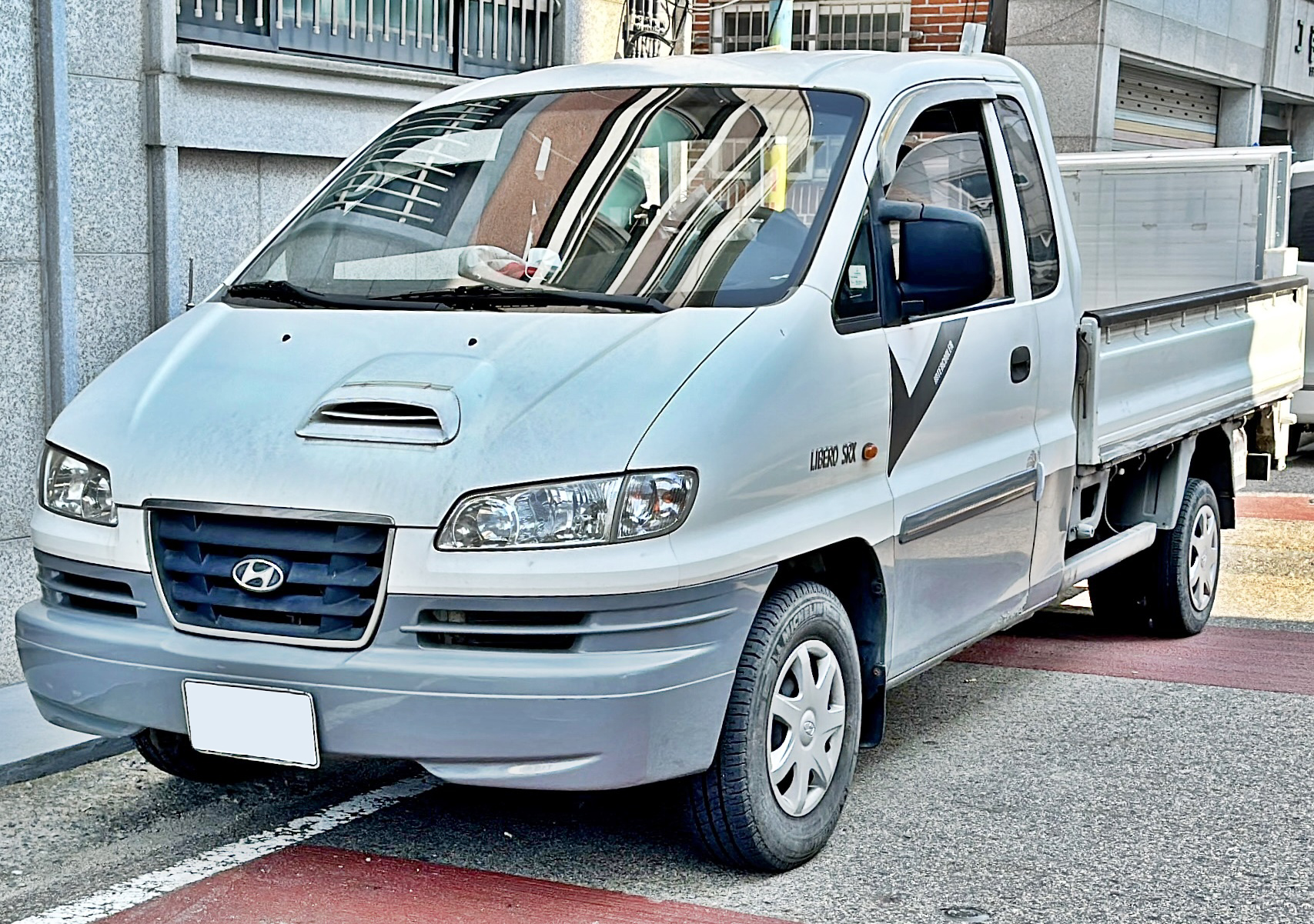
Hyundai Libero, the pickup version of the A1-series Starex

Between 2000 and 2007, Hyundai manufactured a pickup version of the A1-series Starex. Known as the Hyundai Libero in the domestic South Korean market, it was meant to replace the Hyundai Porter in the lineup. They were equipped with a 2.5-liter diesel engine (in normally aspirated and turbocharged forms) or 3.0-liter Sigma gasoline V6, and came in a multiple body styles, including pickup and flatbed. In most European countries it was marketed as the Hyundai H-1 SR, but in the Netherlands, it was sold as the Hyundai H200/H300 Pickup.

=== JAC Refine ===
The Starex was also produced in China under the name JAC Refine by Anhui Jianghuai Automobile from March 2002 to 2015 under the Hyundai licence. It was very successful, with a market share of about 20 percent. From 2003 to 2008, it has consecutively won "Year's MPV" and "The Best Official Car" from 2004 to 2008. In 2007, it was granted "The Best MPV" and "The Best MPV for Government". The Refine was available with a 2.0-litre turbo or 2.4-litre petrol engine and a 2.8-litre turbo-diesel engine mated to a five-speed manual or four-speed automatic gearbox. The 1.8-litre petrol and turbocharged diesel variants, along with the 1.9-litre turbo-diesel, arrived in 2012, 2013, and 2015 respectively, as well as a six-speed manual gearbox for 1.8- and 1.9-litre diesel.

The JAC Refine has also been available as the Pyeonghwa Samcheonri 0713 in North Korea; mostl likely this is simply a case of badges having been applied to imported vehicles.

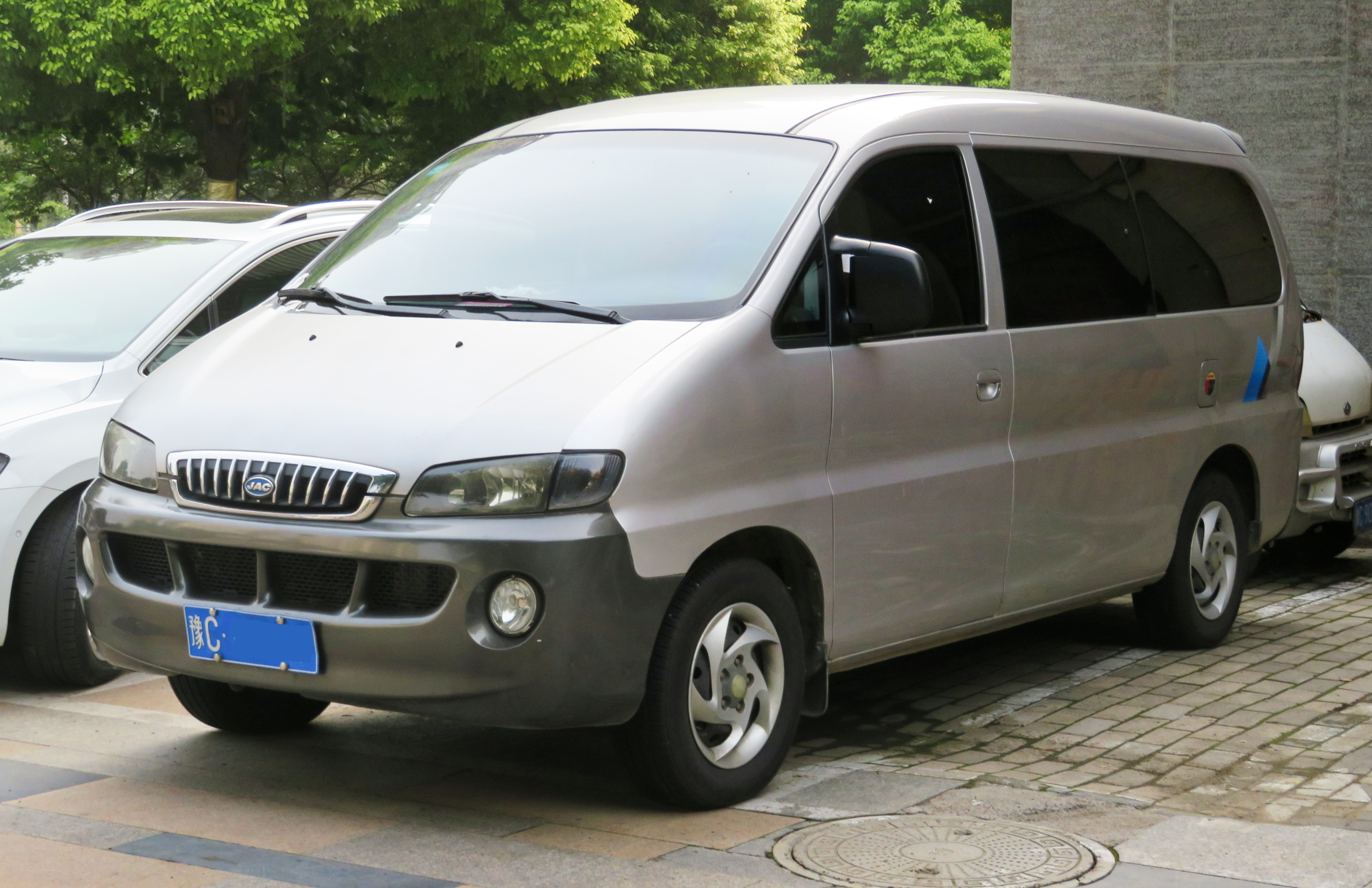
JAC Refine M5 (pre-facelift)

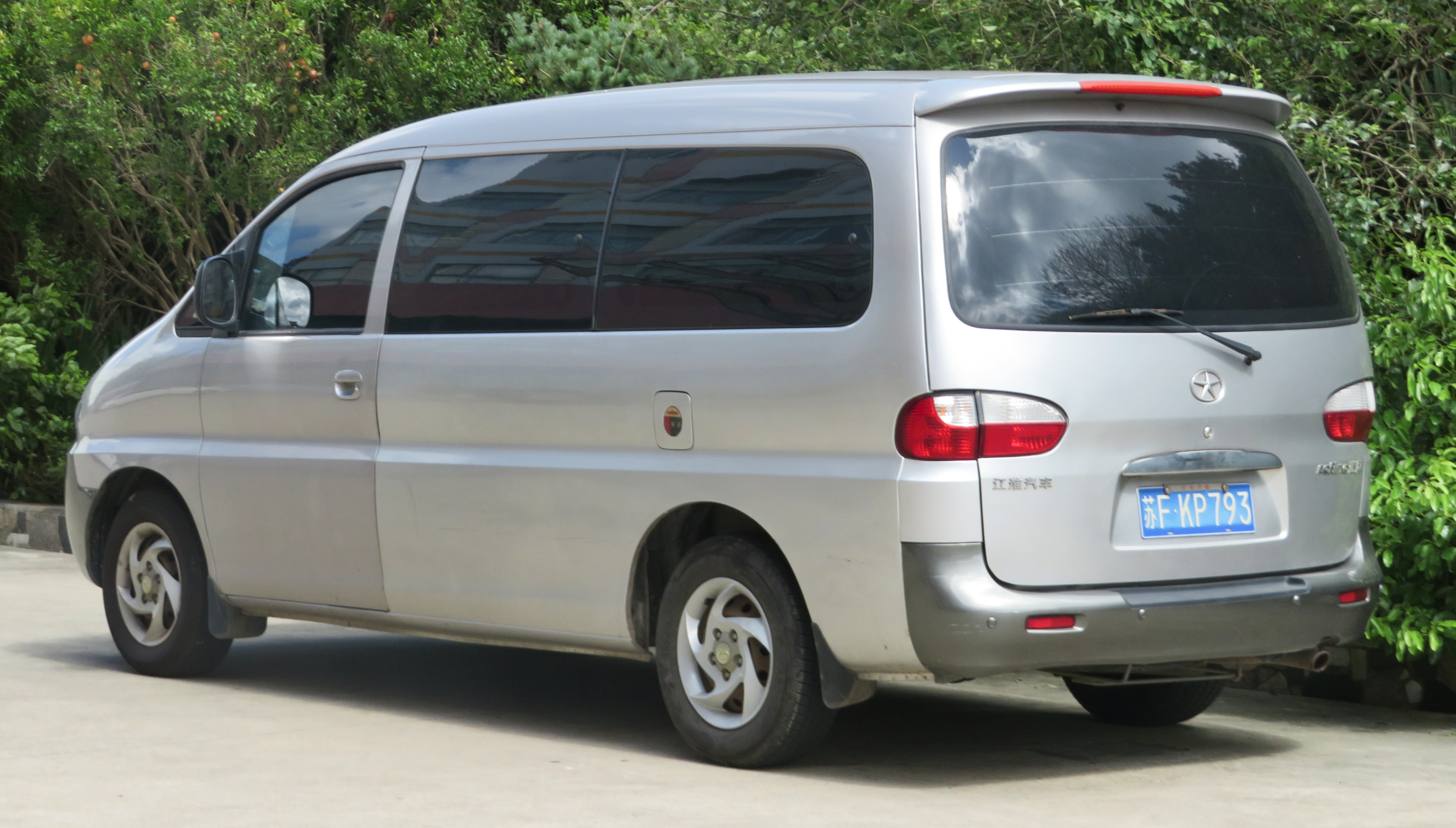
JAC Refine M5 (pre-facelift)

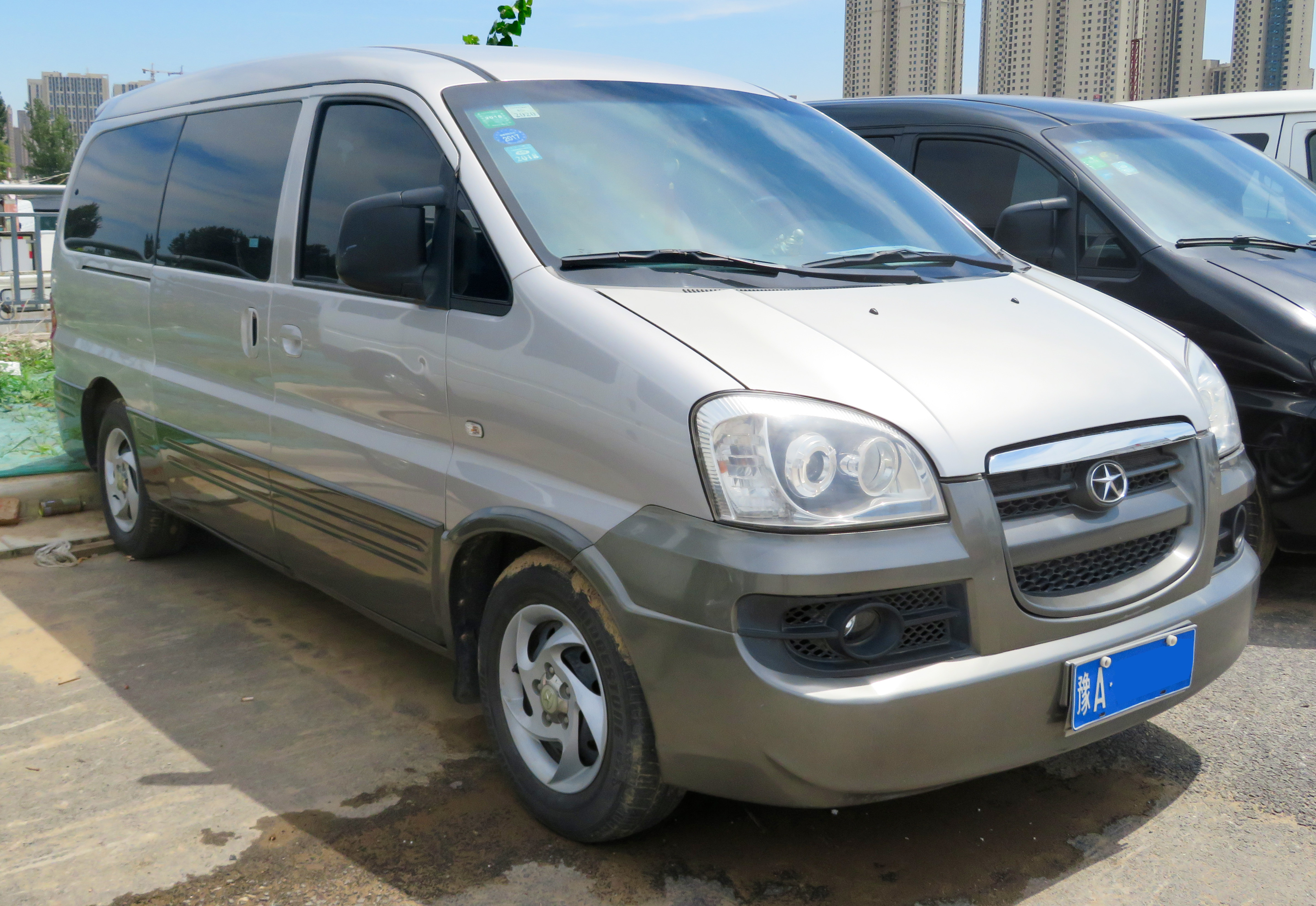
JAC Refine M5 (facelift)

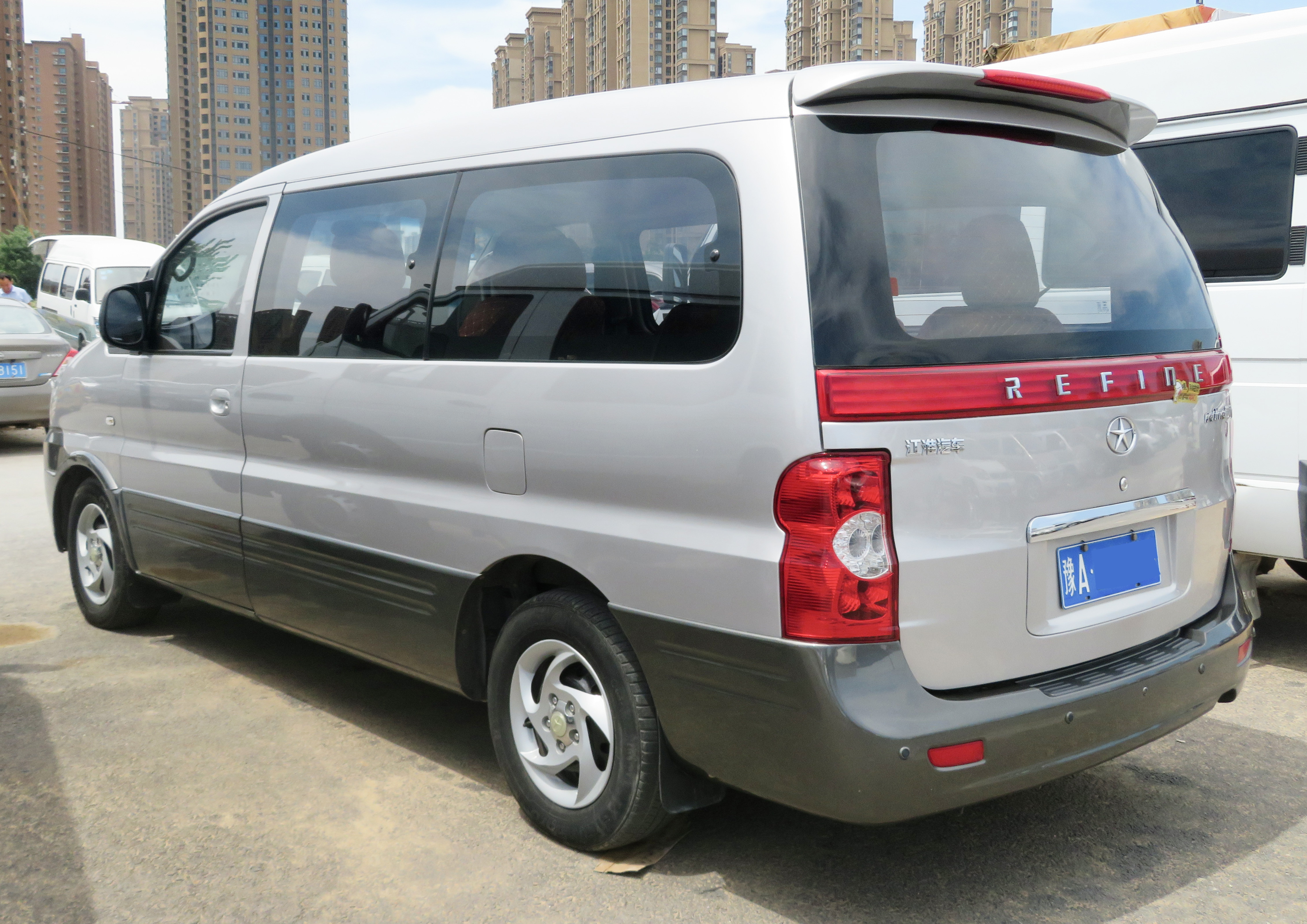
JAC Refine M5 (facelift)

== Second generation (TQ; 2007) ==
Second generation (TQ)
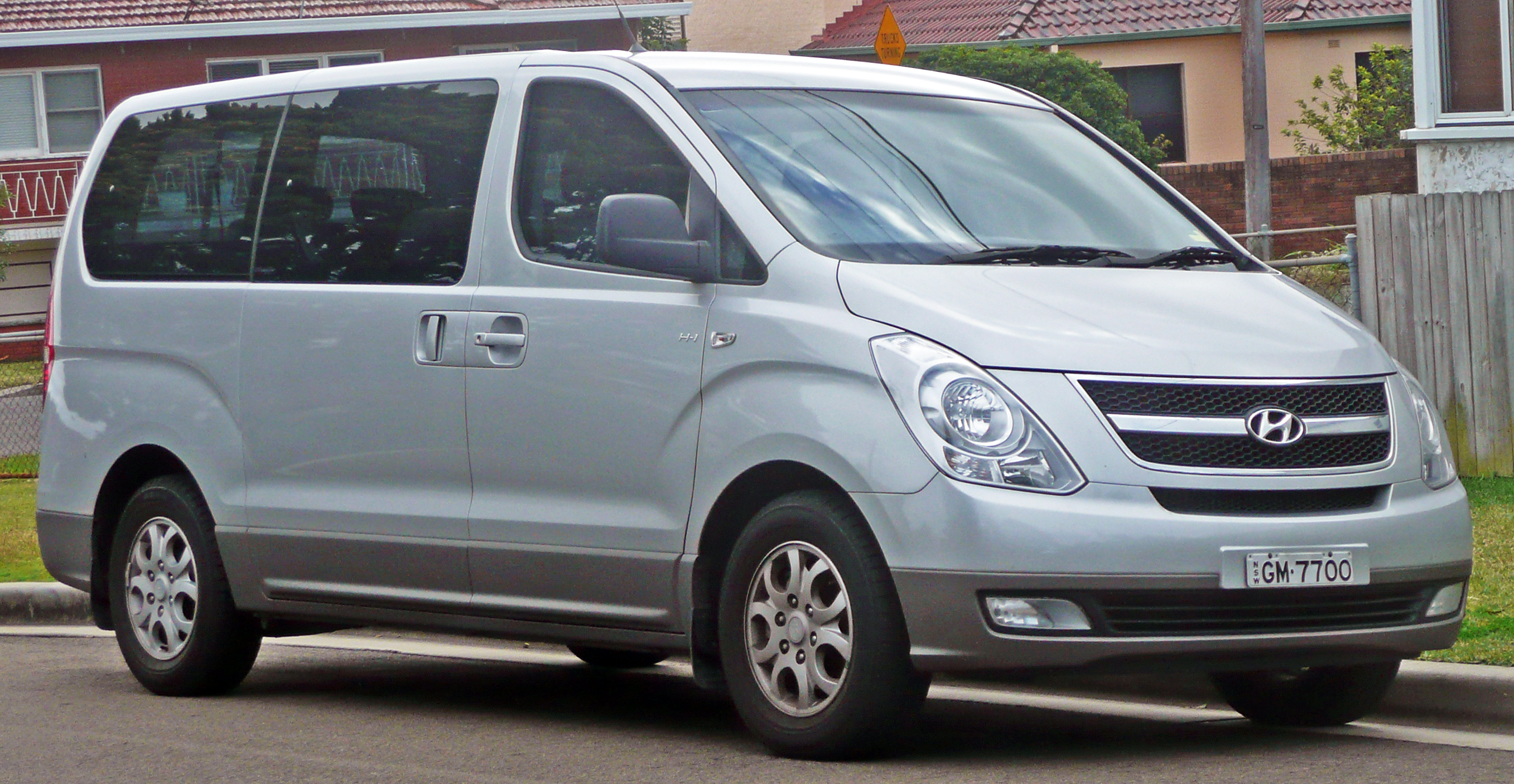
- Hyundai iMax (Australia; pre-facelift)

Overview
- Also called: Hyundai Grand Starex; Hyundai H-1; Hyundai H-1 Cargo; Hyundai H-1 iLoad; Hyundai H-1 iMax (Australia); Hyundai H-1 Travel; Hyundai H300; Hyundai Huiyi; Hyundai i800 Hyundai Montana (Ireland); Hyundai Starex Royale (Malaysia); Dodge/Ram H100 Van/Wagon (Mexico)
- Production: 2007–2021 (South Korea); 2007–2023 (International)

Body and chassis
- Body style: 5-door van 5-door minibus 5-door panel van
- Related: Forthing CM7

Powertrain
- Engine: Petrol: 2.4 L Theta II MPi I4; Petrol/LPG: 2.4 L Theta LPi I4; Diesel: 2.5 L D4BH TCi I4; 2.5 L A II CRDI VGT I4; 2.5 L A II CRDI WGT I4
- Transmission: 5-speed manual 6-speed manual (2012–2021); 4/5-speed automatic

Dimensions
- Wheelbase: 3,200 mm (126.0 in)
- Length: 2007–2018: 5,125 mm (201.8 in); 2018–2021: 5,150 mm (202.8 in)
- Width: 1,920 mm (75.6 in)
- Height: Wagon: 1,925 mm (75.8 in); 1,935 mm (76.2 in)
- Curb weight: 1,832–2,620 kg (4,039–5,776 lb)

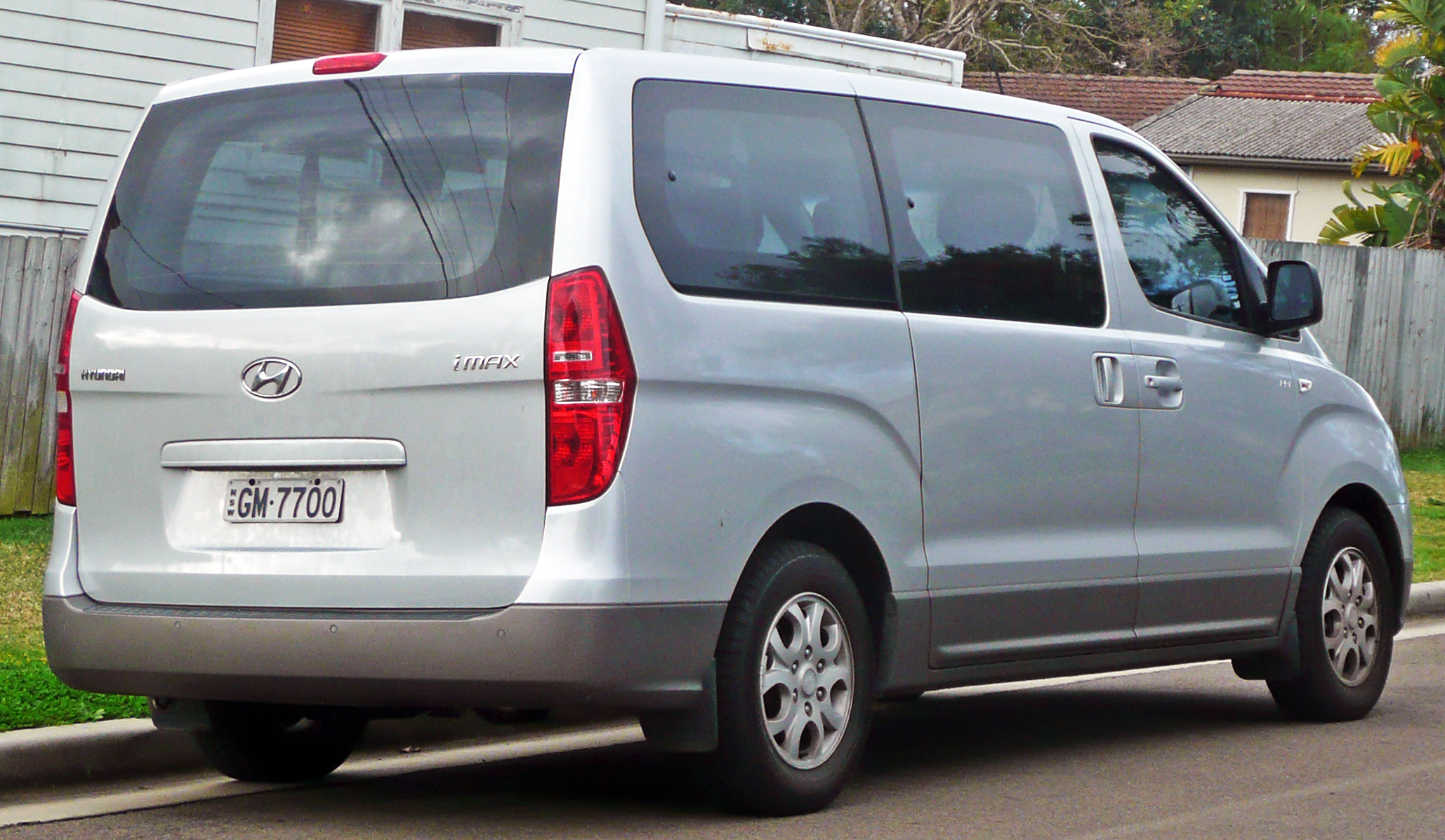
Hyundai iMax (pre-facelift)

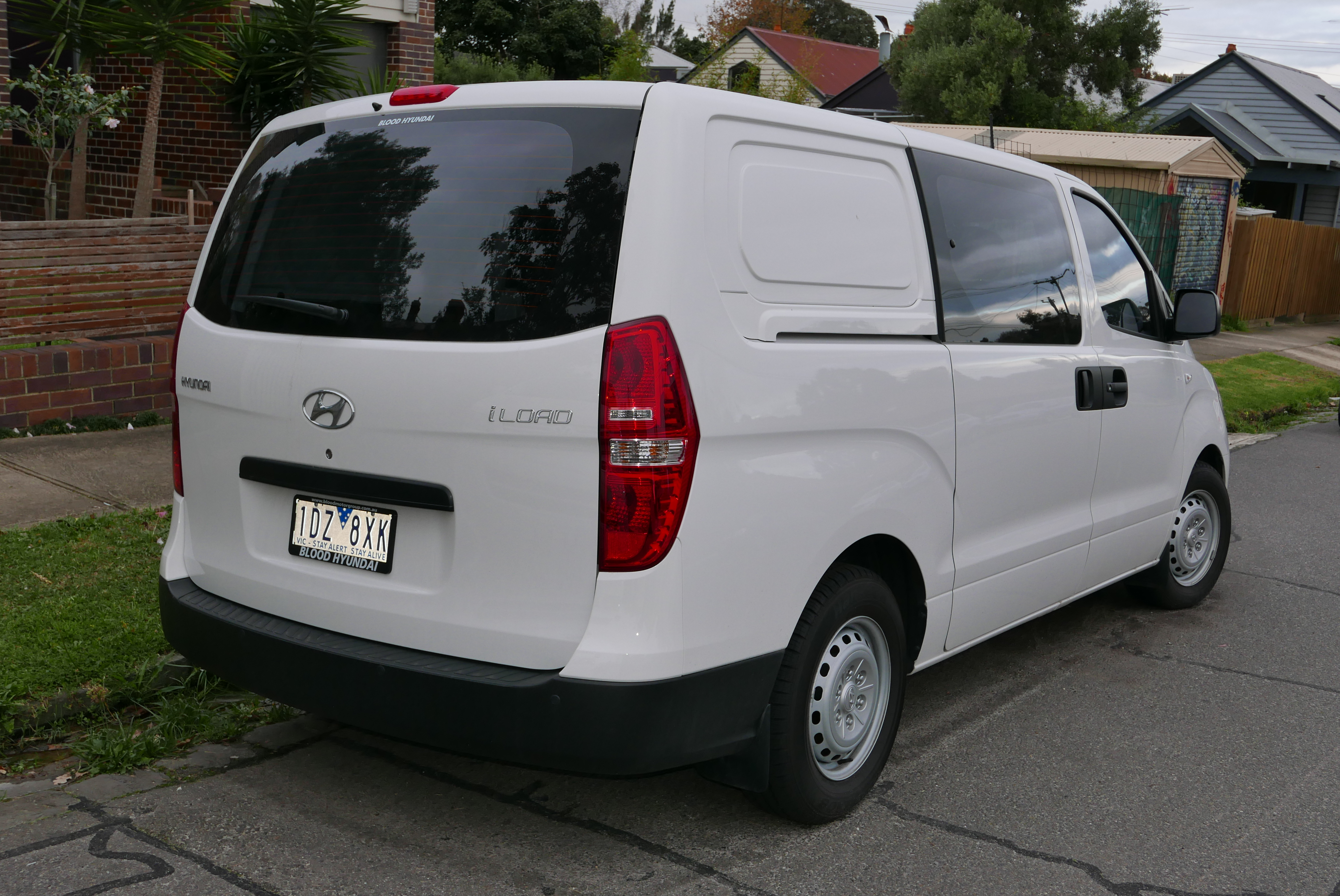
Hyundai iLoad (pre-facelift)

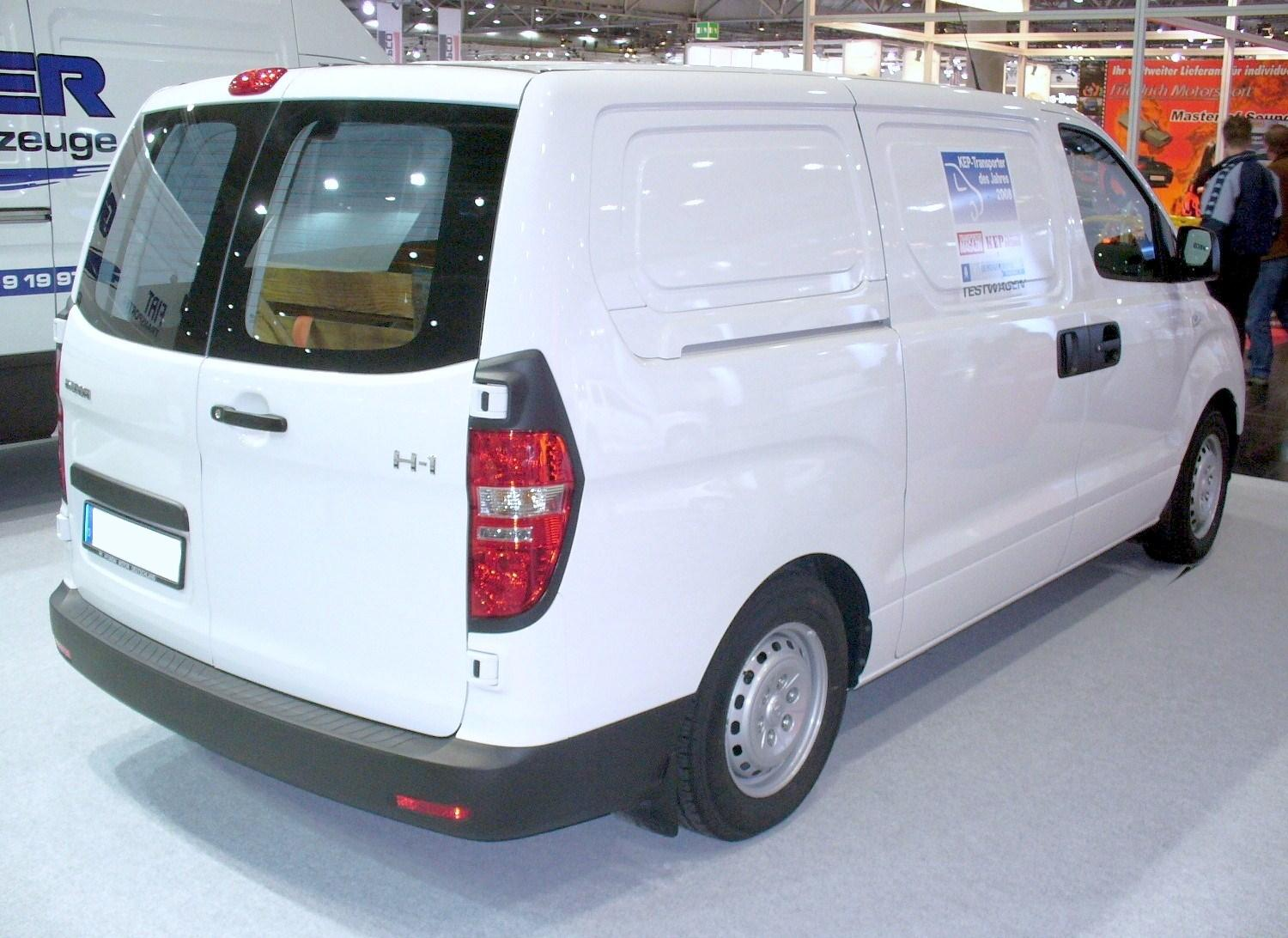
Hyundai H-1 van (pre-facelift)

In 2012, Hyundai revised their diesel engines for the UK and Australian models. Chief among the changes is the addition of a new six-speed manual gearbox in place of the old five-speed unit, improving official fuel economy by 0.5 litres per 100 km to 8.0L/100 km. Power for the manual variant dropped from 125 to 100 kW (170 to 136 PS; 168 to 134 hp) due to a switch from a variable geometry turbocharger to a conventional one with a wastegate, while torque figures decreased from 343 to 392 N⋅m (253 to 289 lb⋅ft). The automatic variant was not downgraded and maximum power remained as before, while torque increased to 441 N⋅m (325 lb⋅ft). The revised automatic's fuel mileage improved by even more than the manual.

=== Regions ===
In the UK, the passenger model is sold as the i800 and is available in two variants, the SE and SE Nav. Both are available with either a manual or automatic transmission and have the 2.5l CRDi diesel engine. The panel van is marketed as the iLoad.

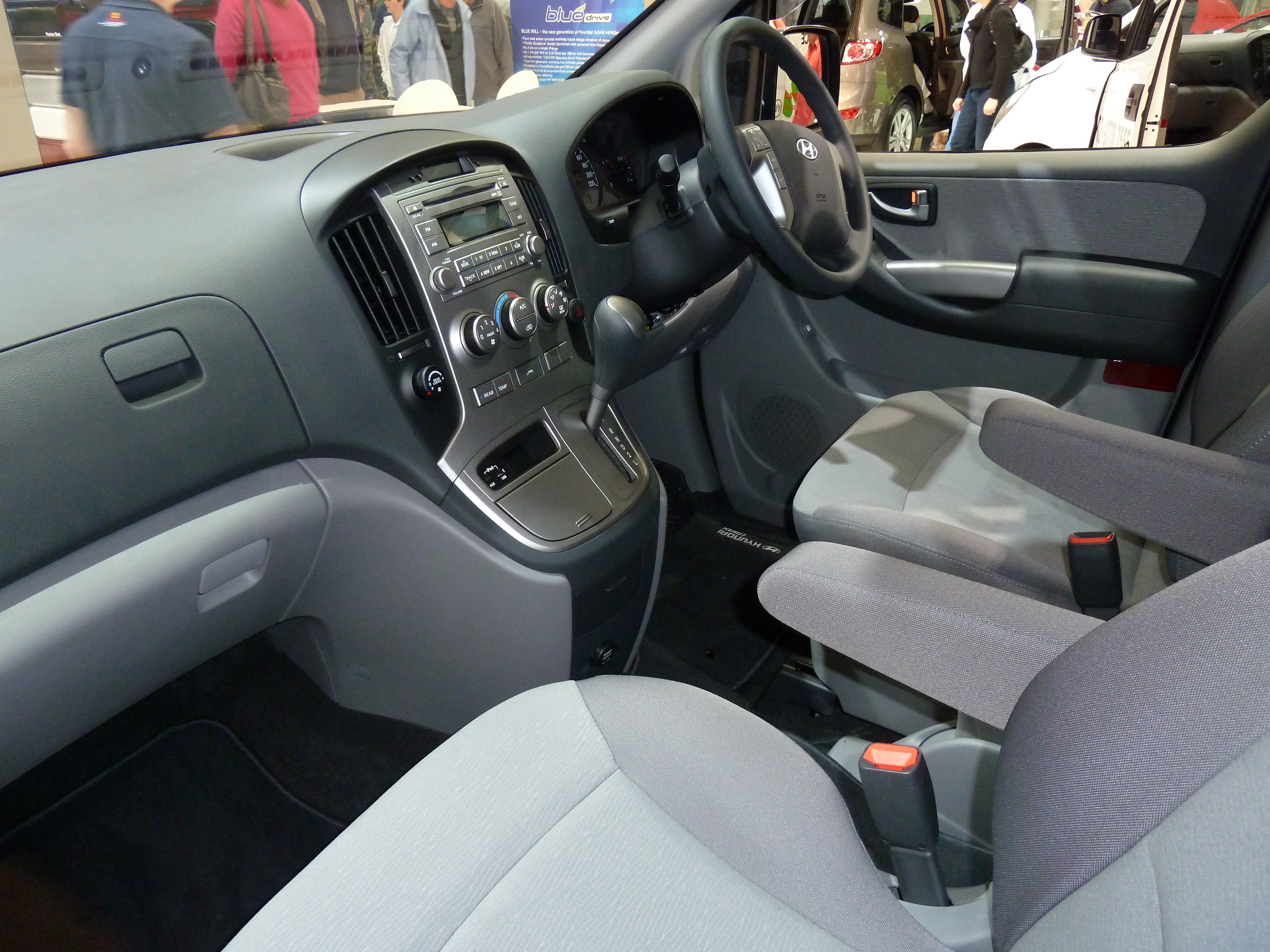
Interior

In Malaysia, the second-generation Hyundai Starex was launched with 11 seats in May 2008. In August 2009, the Starex was updated and renamed as the Hyundai Grand Starex Royale. Updates included a new grille, body-coloured wing mirrors opposed to black, addition of a rear windscreen wiper, and a new in-car entertainment roof-mounted system.

In July 2011, the Malaysian Starex was updated yet again. The changes this time included a revised chrome grille, the addition of LED daytime running lights, side skirting, revised front and back bumpers, and a new rear spoiler with a built-in stop light. The second row of seats gained swivel functionality, the instrument cluster was revised, and the electronic stability programme, or ESP, and a GPS navigation system became standard equipment. This July 2011 update was available with a sole GLS variant, with an optional premium package being available.

It received yet another grille update in 2014 and was now available with two variants: Base and Deluxe. The front end was revised again in 2017, which included a revised front grille and front bumper. The update also brought along revised side cladding, gloss back panelling on the rear taillights, and a revised rear bumper with exhaust cutouts.

During the 2018 Kuala Lumpur International Motor Show or KLIMS, the Starex received a new front end design and was now available with a sole Executive variant.

In the Philippines, the Starex is called the Hyundai Grand Starex and was launched in December 2007. It was offered in 3 grades: the GL, with both ten and twelve-seater versions with manual transmissions; the GLS, a ten-seater with a five-speed automatic transmission; and the Gold, a higher-end variation of the GLS with the same seating capacity and transmission. In 2014, the Grand Starex Platinum was launched as the top-of-the-line model. It has seen a wide variety of uses in the country; being used as delivery vans, for public transport, as ambulances, and even as funeral hearses, which the Starex is best known for.

In Indonesia, the second-generation Hyundai Starex is available as the Hyundai H-1, and was introduced in 2008 with three options: GLS, Elegance, and XG. At first, only petrol engines were available for H-1. The diesel engines came in February 2010, when Hyundai decided to produce H-1 in Indonesia for the ASEAN market.

In Thailand, the second-generation Hyundai Starex is marketed as the Hyundai H-1. It comes in three variants: the Touring, Executive, and Deluxe, all with 12 seats. The Executive and Deluxe were badged as "Maestro" until a minor change in 2011. The facelift H-1 was launched in Thailand in August 2018. On 8 November 2021, the H-1 Elite NS was released and limited to 300 units. On 26 September 2023, the H-1 Elite Final Edition was released and limited productions before the H-1 was discontinued. The discontinuation was due to the use of a Euro 4 diesel engine, which is against the requirements in Thailand. However, Hyundai began use for other new models with a Euro 5 diesel engine from January 2024.

The Grand Starex "VIP" variant is based on H-1. Features include seven seats with second-row "Double VIP" seats that can electrically control seat inclination and leg support and a 19-inch TV and DVD player. They became available in late 2010. In late 2012, the Grand Starex "Premium" became available with sliding "Double Super VIP" seats on the second row and a DVD player with a smaller 10.2-inch screen.

=== First facelift ===
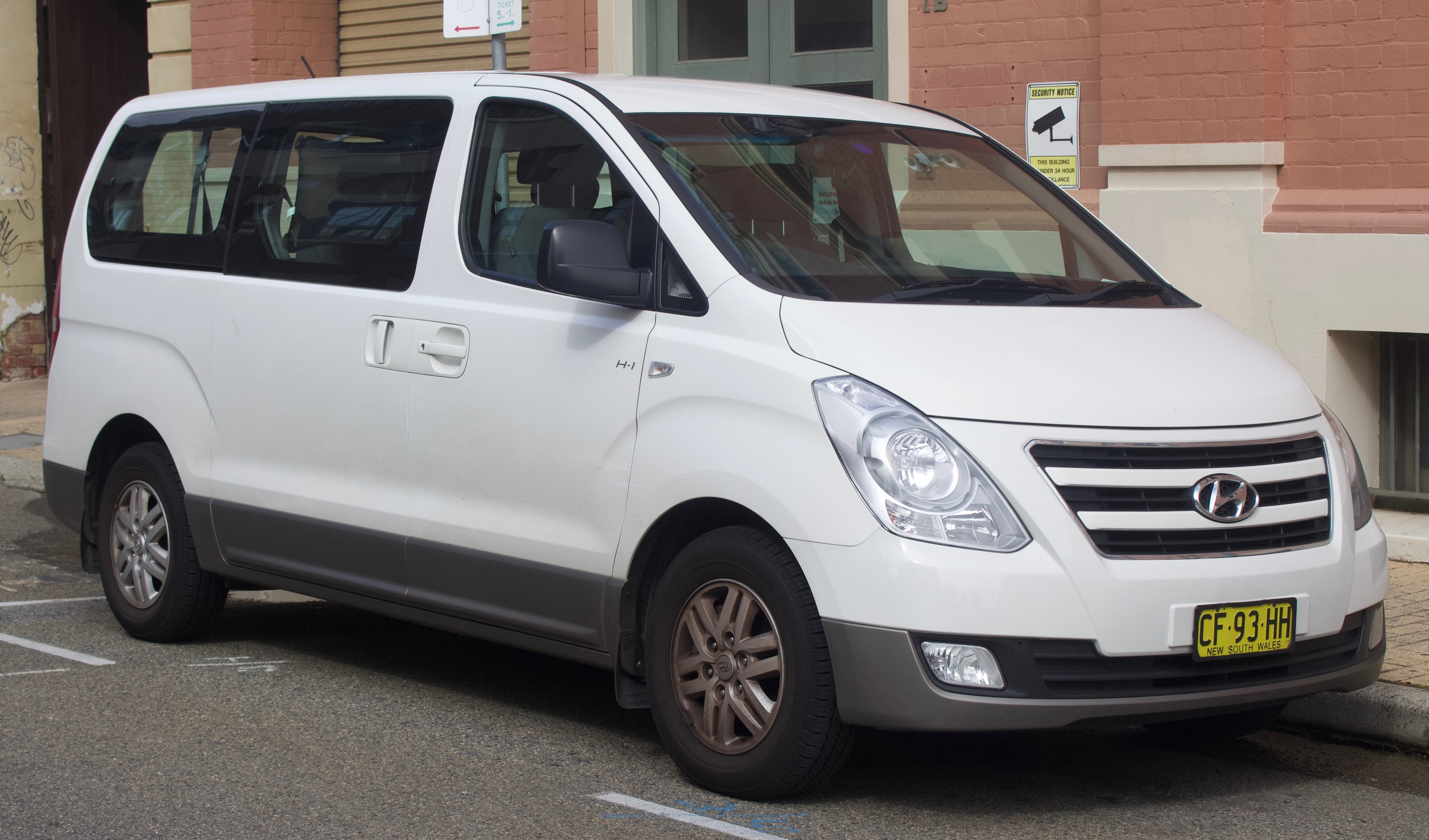
Hyundai iMax (first facelift)

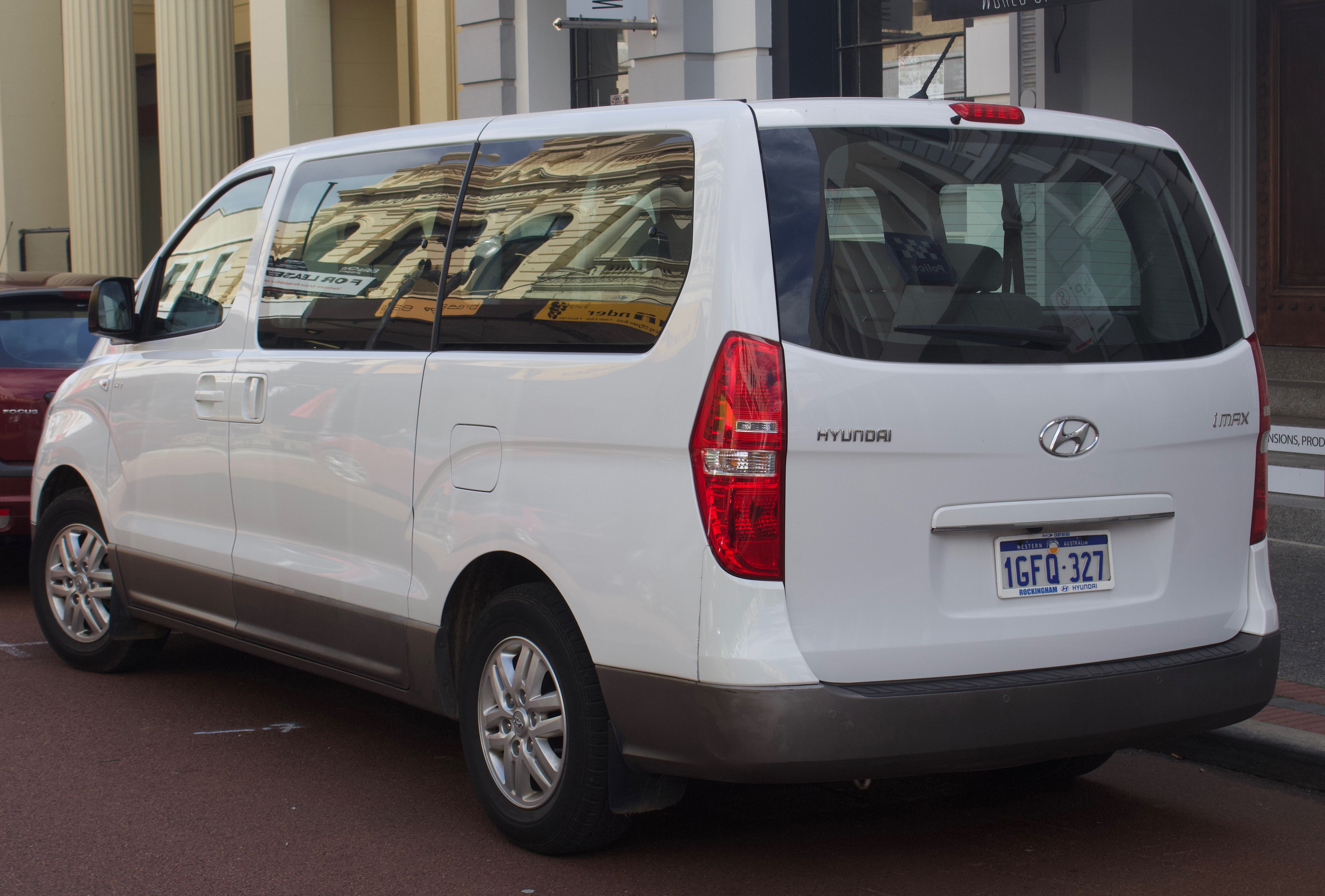
Hyundai iMax (first facelift)

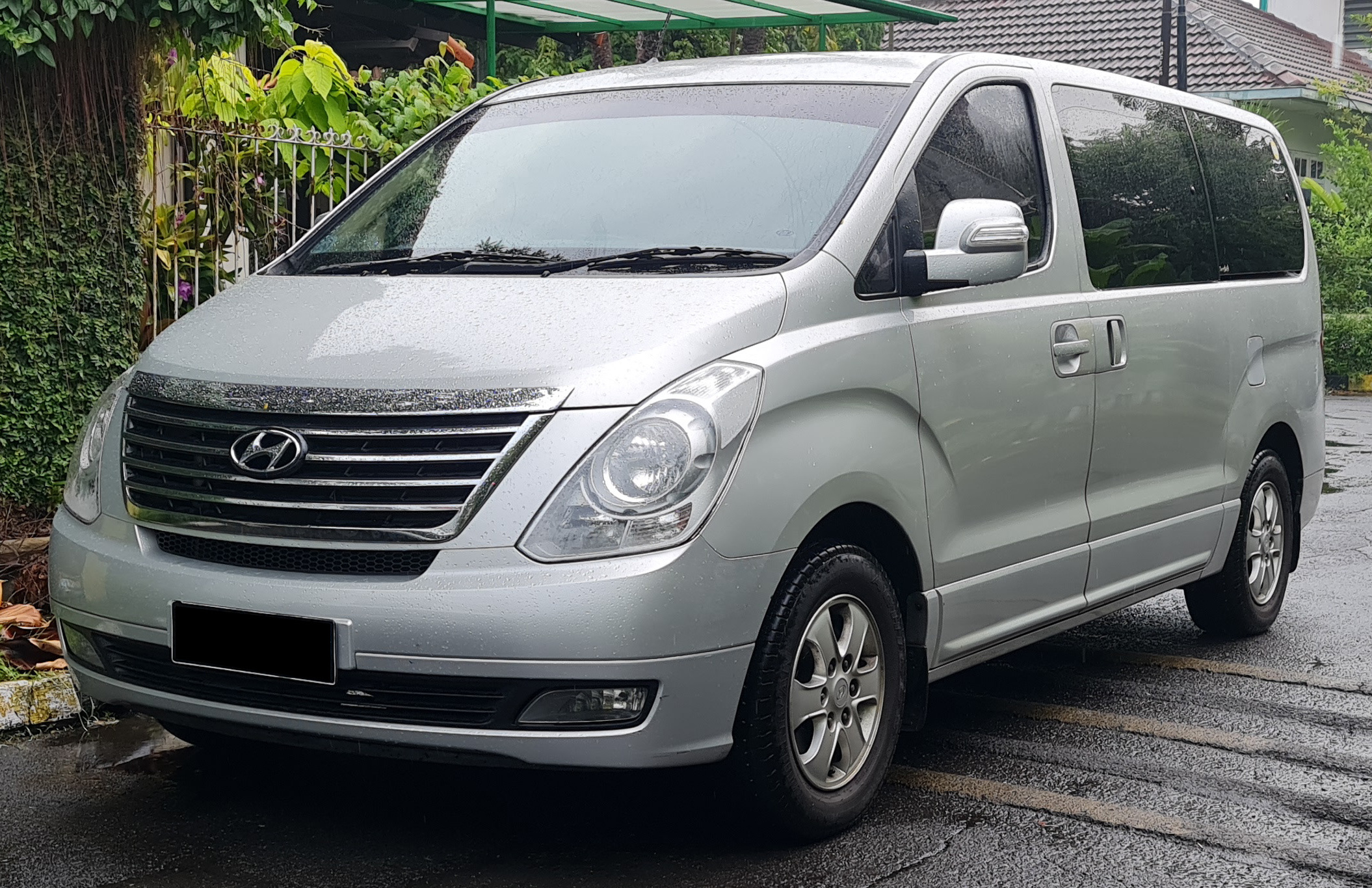
Hyundai H-1 (first facelift)

=== Second facelift ===
Hyundai gave a second facelift to the Grand Starex in 2018, introducing new Urban and Limousine models, updating the interior. The standard version uses the same cockpit as the old model, while the Urban version has the floating touch display and four-spoke steering wheel like most Hyundai vehicles. Special vehicle options, such as ambulance, school service and camping, were also revised. Only the exterior was updated for right-hand drive models. The Hyundai Grand Starex was discontinued in South Korea on 18 March 2021, succeeded by the Hyundai Staria.

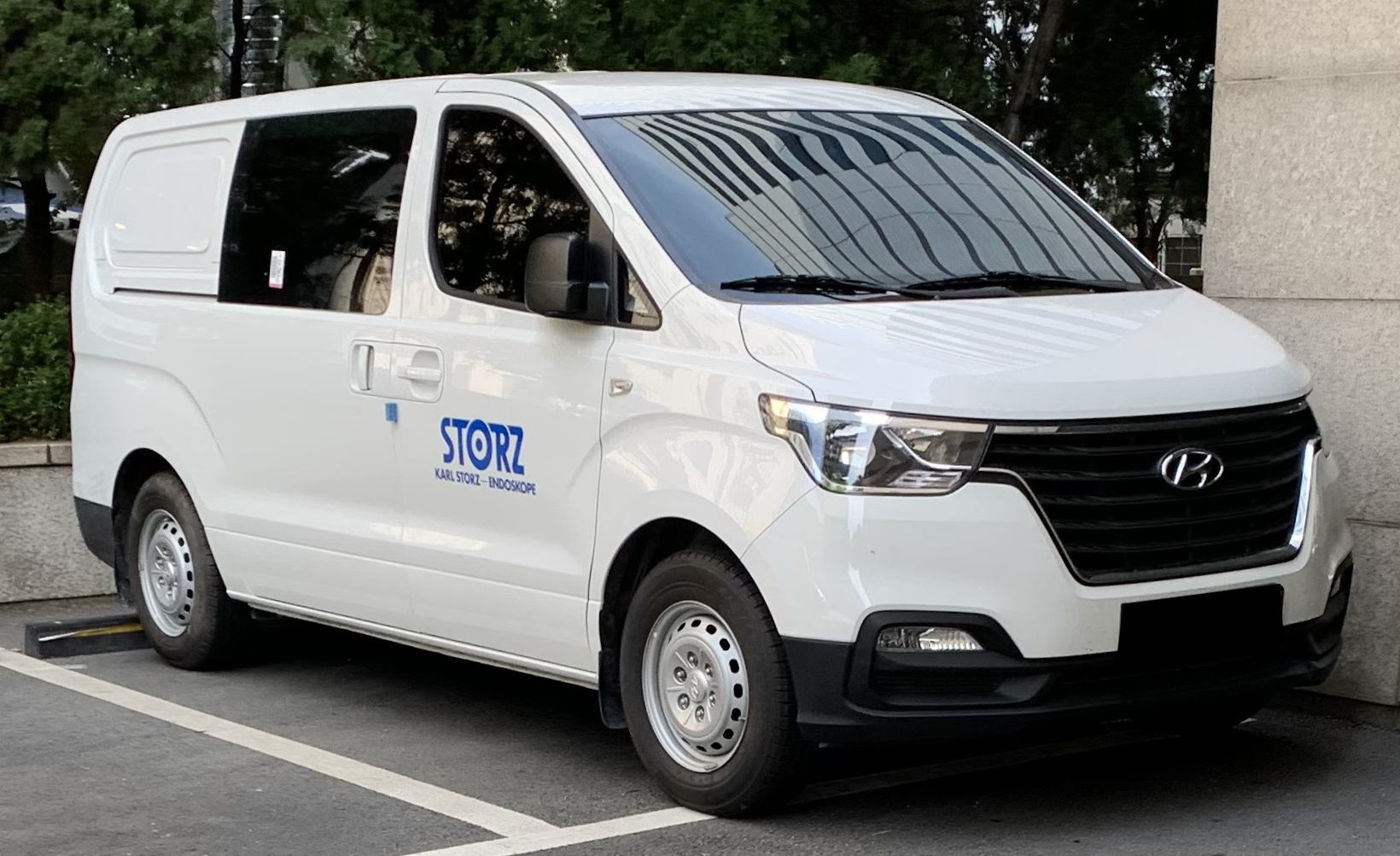
Hyundai Starex (second facelift)

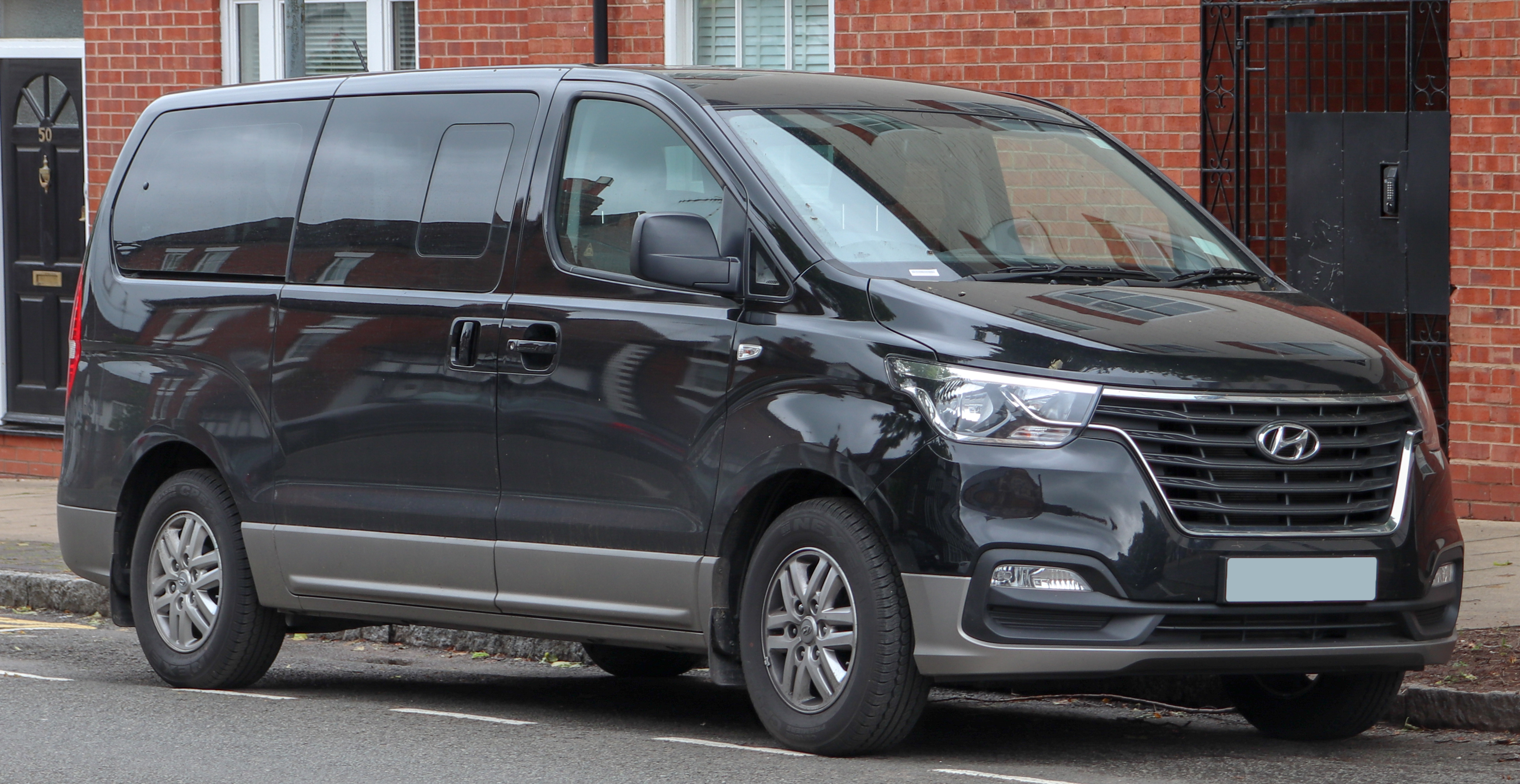
Hyundai i800 (second facelift, UK)

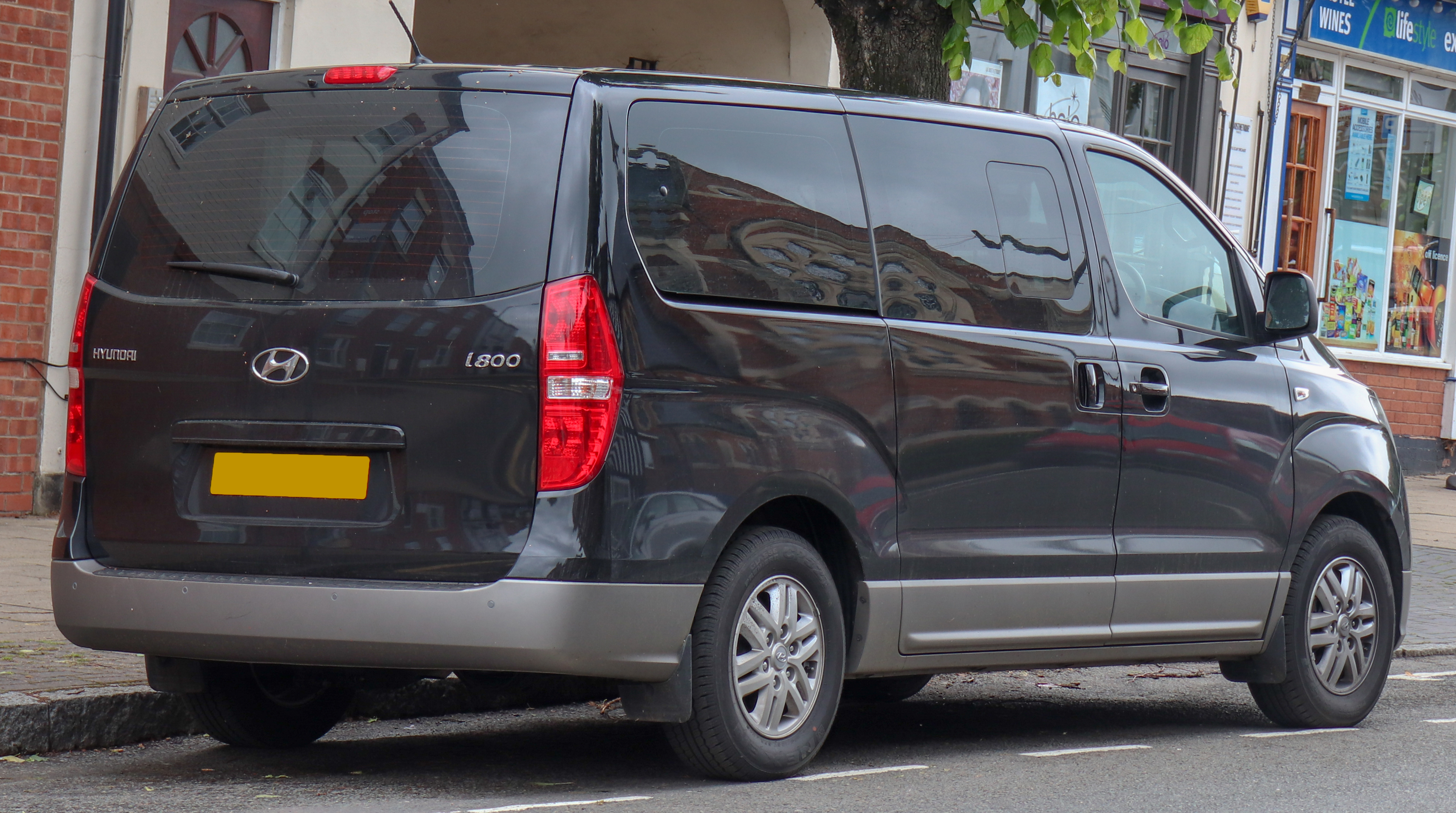
Hyundai i800 (second facelift, UK)

=== Powertrain ===
Specs
Model	Aspiration	Displacement	Transmission	Power	Torque
Petrol
Theta (L4KB)	Natural	2,359 cc	5-speed manual 4-speed automatic	124 kW (169 PS)	226 N⋅m (166 lb⋅ft)
LPG
Theta (L4KB)	Natural	2,359 cc	5-speed manual 4-speed automatic	117 kW (159 PS)	226 N⋅m (166 lb⋅ft)
Diesel
D4BH TCi	Turbo	2,476 cc	5-speed manual 4-speed automatic	74 kW (100 PS)	235 N⋅m (174 lb⋅ft)
A (D4CB) VGT	Turbo	2,497 cc	5-speed manual 4-speed automatic	128 kW (174 PS)	402 N⋅m (297 lb⋅ft)
A II (D4CB) WGT	Turbo	2,497 cc	6-speed manual	103 kW (140 PS)	353 N⋅m (260 lb⋅ft)
A II (D4CB) VGT	Turbo	2,497 cc	5-speed automatic	129 kW (175 PS)	451 N⋅m (333 lb⋅ft)

=== Safety ===
ANCAP test results Hyundai iMax petrol and diesel variants (2009)
Test	Score
Overall	4 /5 stars
Frontal offset	9.81/16
Side impact	16/16
Pole	Not Assessed
Seat belt reminders	0/3
Whiplash protection	Not Assessed
Pedestrian protection	Poor
Electronic stability control	Standard

ANCAP test results Hyundai iLOAD petrol and diesel variants (2009)
Test	Score
Overall	4 /5 stars
Frontal offset	9.81/16
Side impact	16/16
Pole	Not Assessed
Seat belt reminders	0/3
Whiplash protection	Not Assessed
Pedestrian protection	Poor
Electronic stability control	Optional

ANCAP test results Hyundai iLOAD diesel van variants (2011)
Test	Score
Overall	4 /5 stars
Frontal offset	9.81/16
Side impact	16/16
Pole	Not Assessed
Seat belt reminders	0/3
Whiplash protection	Not Assessed
Pedestrian protection	Poor
Electronic stability control	Optional

=== Awards and accolades ===
- Best Large MPV - CIMB Autoworld Car of the Year Awards 2010
