= Hyundai H-1 =

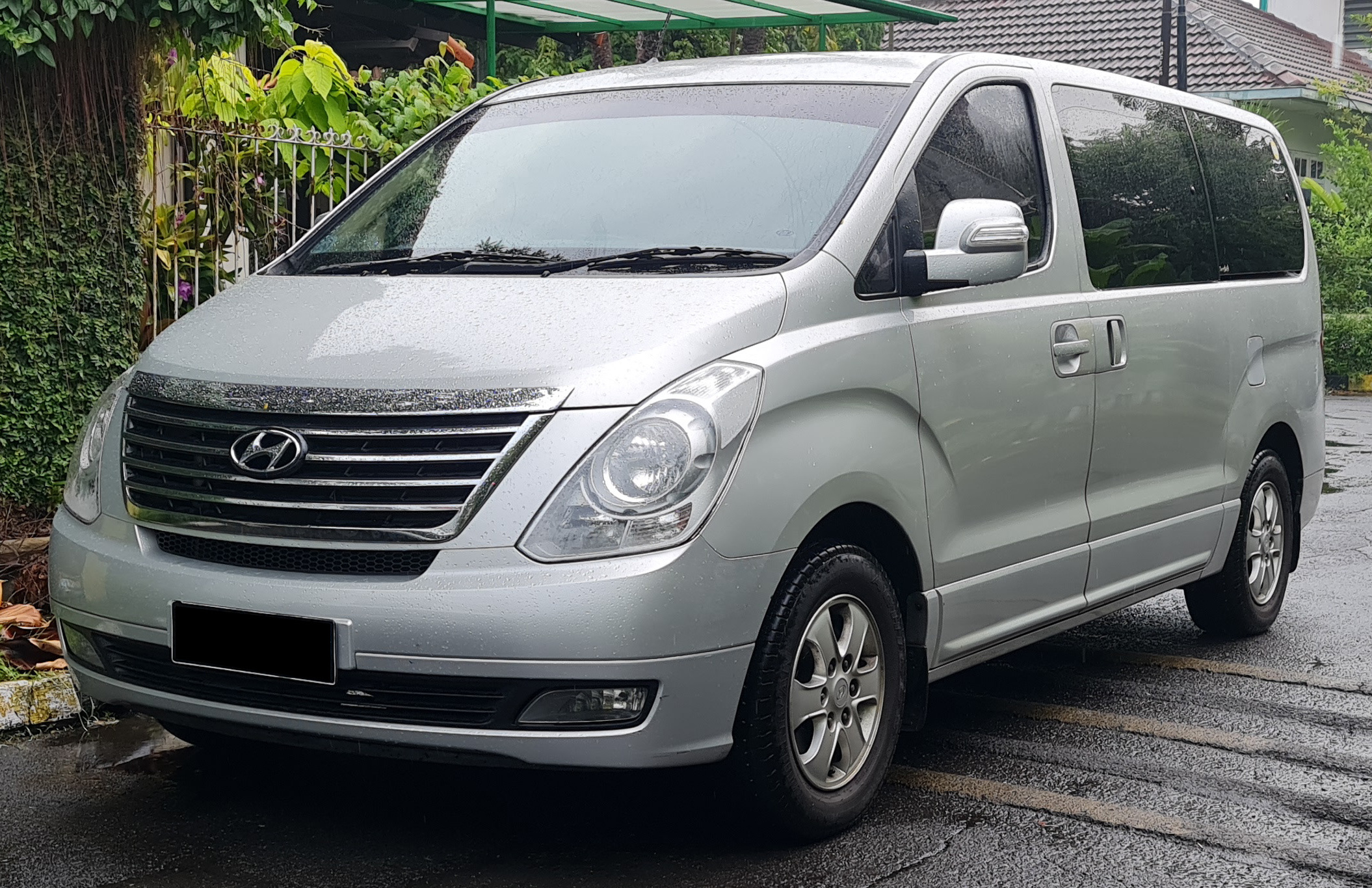
Hyundai H-1 minivan (Starex)

Hyundai H-1 is a nameplate of a van and pickup truck used by Hyundai Motor Company in European export markets for two related models:

- Hyundai Starex (called i800 in Europe, iLoad in Australia and H-200 in the Netherlands), a minibus/van
- Hyundai Libero, a pickup truck
