= Hyundai H350 =

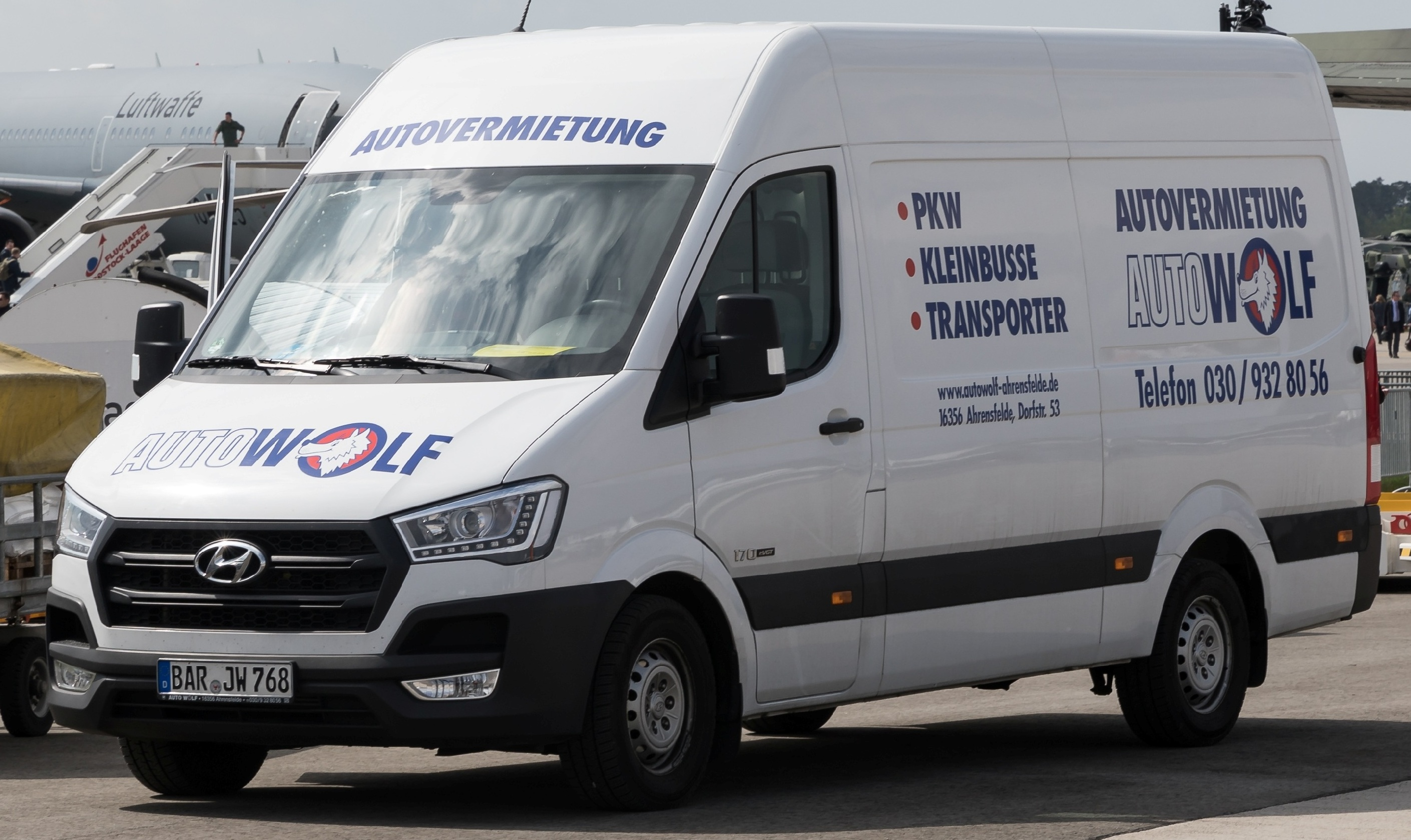

Overview
- Manufacturer: Hyundai
- Also called: Hyundai Solati; Hyundai Solati H350 (Mexico)
- Production: 2014–present
- Assembly: Akçalar, Bursa, Turkey (Karsan); Jeonju, South Korea (Hyundai Motors Jeonju factory); Almaty, Kazakhstan (Hyundai Trans Auto); Batna, Algeria (SARL Global Motors Industries); Santa Rosa, Laguna, Philippines (HARI, 2017–2022); Ninh Bình, Vietnam (HTCV)

Body and chassis
- Class: Light commercial vehicle (M)
- Body style: Panel van Minibus; Chassis Single Cab
- Layout: Front-engine, rear-wheel-drive

Powertrain
- Engine: Diesel: 2.5 L A II CRDI VGT I4
- Transmission: 6-speed manual 10-speed automatic

Dimensions
- Wheelbase: 3,435–3,670 mm (135.2–144.5 in)
- Length: 5,515–6,195 mm (217.1–243.9 in)
- Width: 2,038 mm (80.2 in)
- Height: 2,685–2,690 mm (105.7–105.9 in)
- Curb weight: 3,500 kg (7,716 lb)

Chronology
- Predecessor: Hyundai Starex (Mexico)

The Hyundai H350, also known as the Hyundai Solati in South Korea and Vietnam, and Hyundai Solati H350 in Mexico, is a light commercial full-size van manufactured by the South Korean manufacturer Hyundai since 2014.

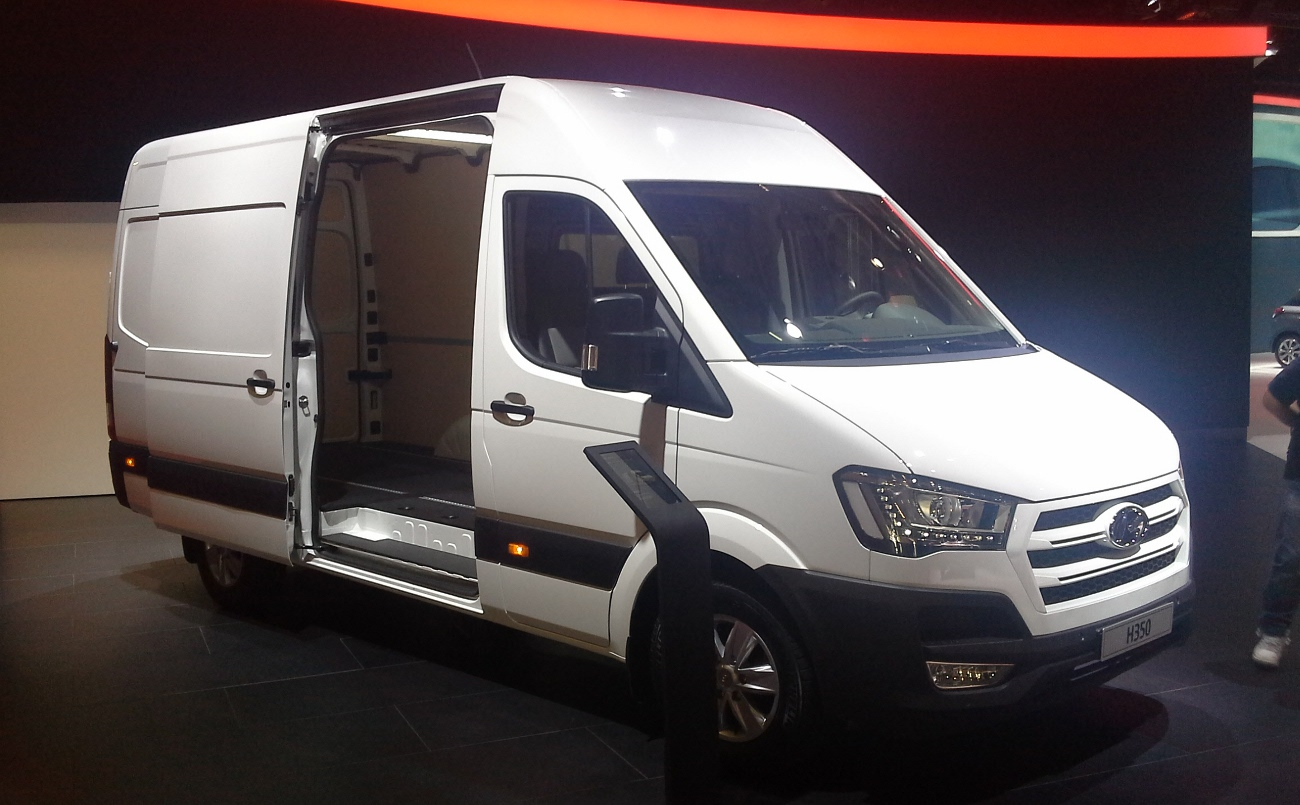
Hyundai H350 in white color scheme

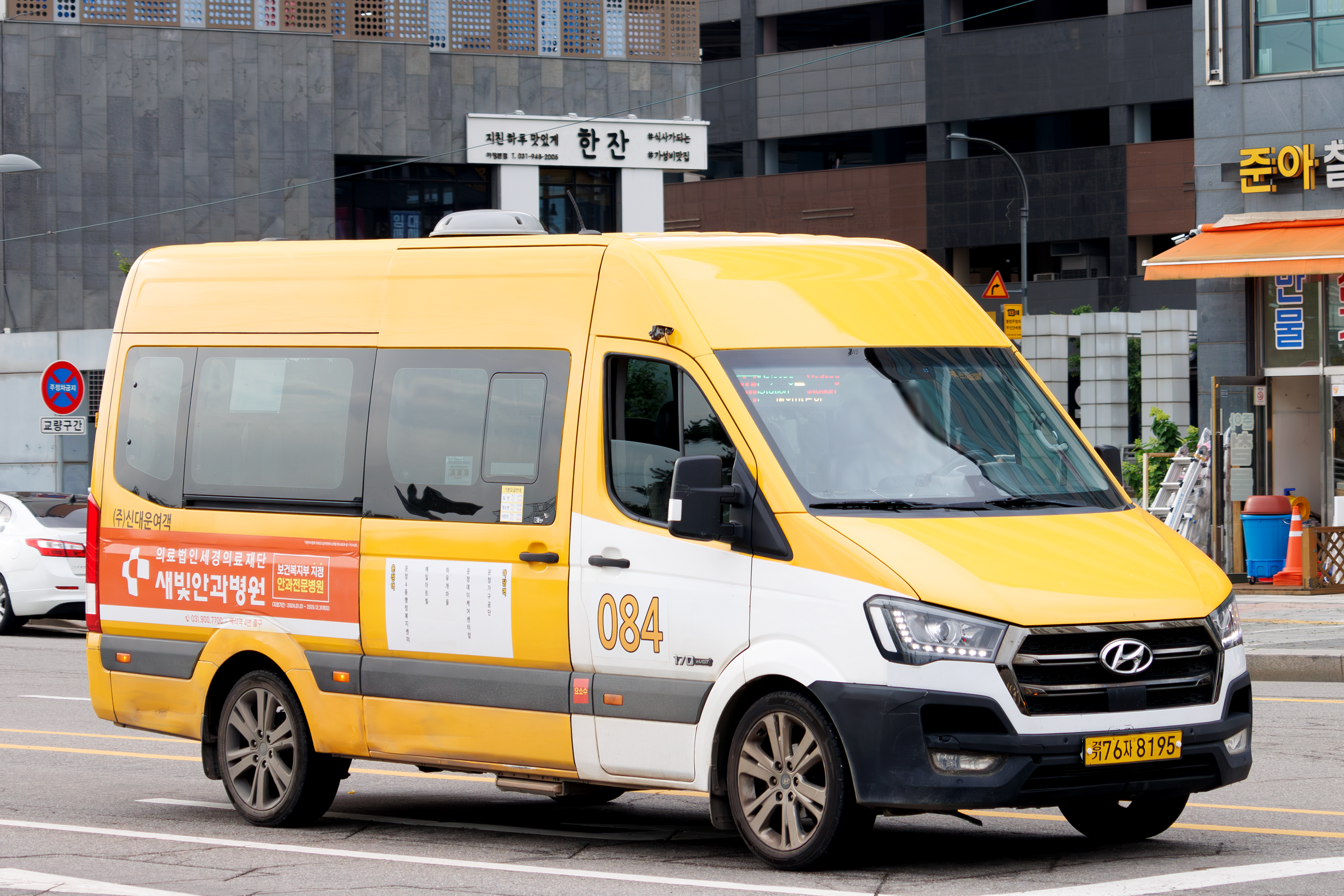
Hyundai H350, town bus in Paju

== Overview ==
The vehicle was first introduced at the 2014 Hanover Motor Show.

The H350 is sold with both cargo and passenger configurations with 3 body types. The high-strength steels make up a majority of the van's construction. The powertrain comes with two separate tunes on the same 2.5-liter turbo-diesel engine. The more powerful of the two produces 167 horsepower and 311 pound-feet of torque. The turbo-diesel is mated to a six-speed manual transmission that powers the rear wheels.

For the passenger configurations, it can seat up to 14-17 passengers and for cargo versions, the front cabin can seat up to 3 people. The van comes with safety features such as an airbag for both driver and front passenger. The 4.2-inch TFT display shows the vehicle stats while high-strength steel passenger compartment ensures rear occupant's safety. The vehicle also comes with electronic stability control which keeps the van away from losing control at any speeds.

The H350 is manufactured complete knock down form by Hyundai and assembled by Jeonju plant in South Korea, Global Motors Industrie in Algeria and by Karsan company in Turkey. It is also assembled in Vietnam by Hyundai Thanh Cong and by HARI from 2017 until 2022 in the Philippines.

The name H350 refers to the gross vehicle weight rating of the vehicle, 3,500 kg.
