= Taxis of South Korea =

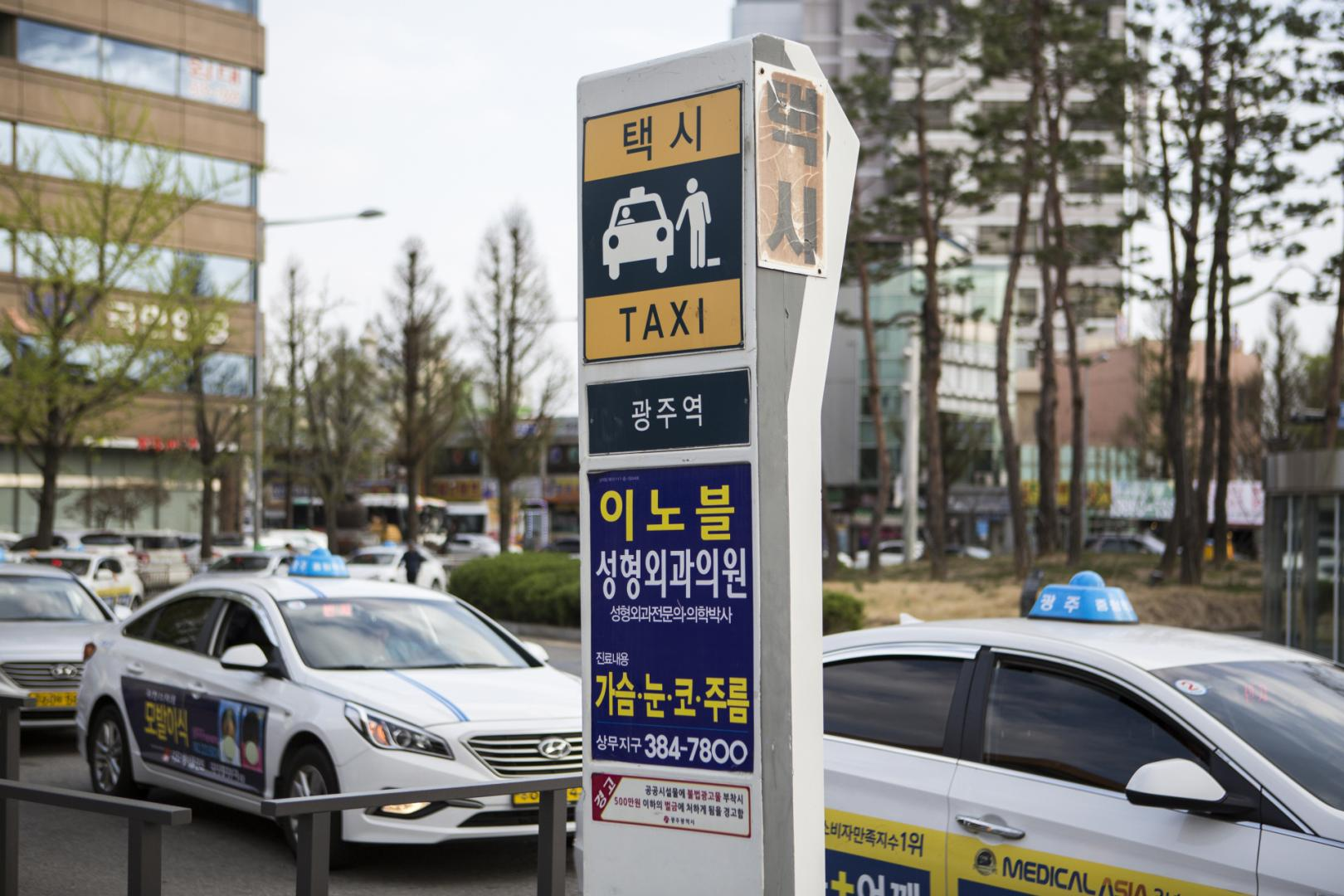
Taxi stands in Gwangju

In South Korea, taxis are largely categorized as light, compact, medium, large, deluxe, or luxury. The operating years, engine displacement, and vehicle size are stipulated by the country's law.

== Types of taxi ==
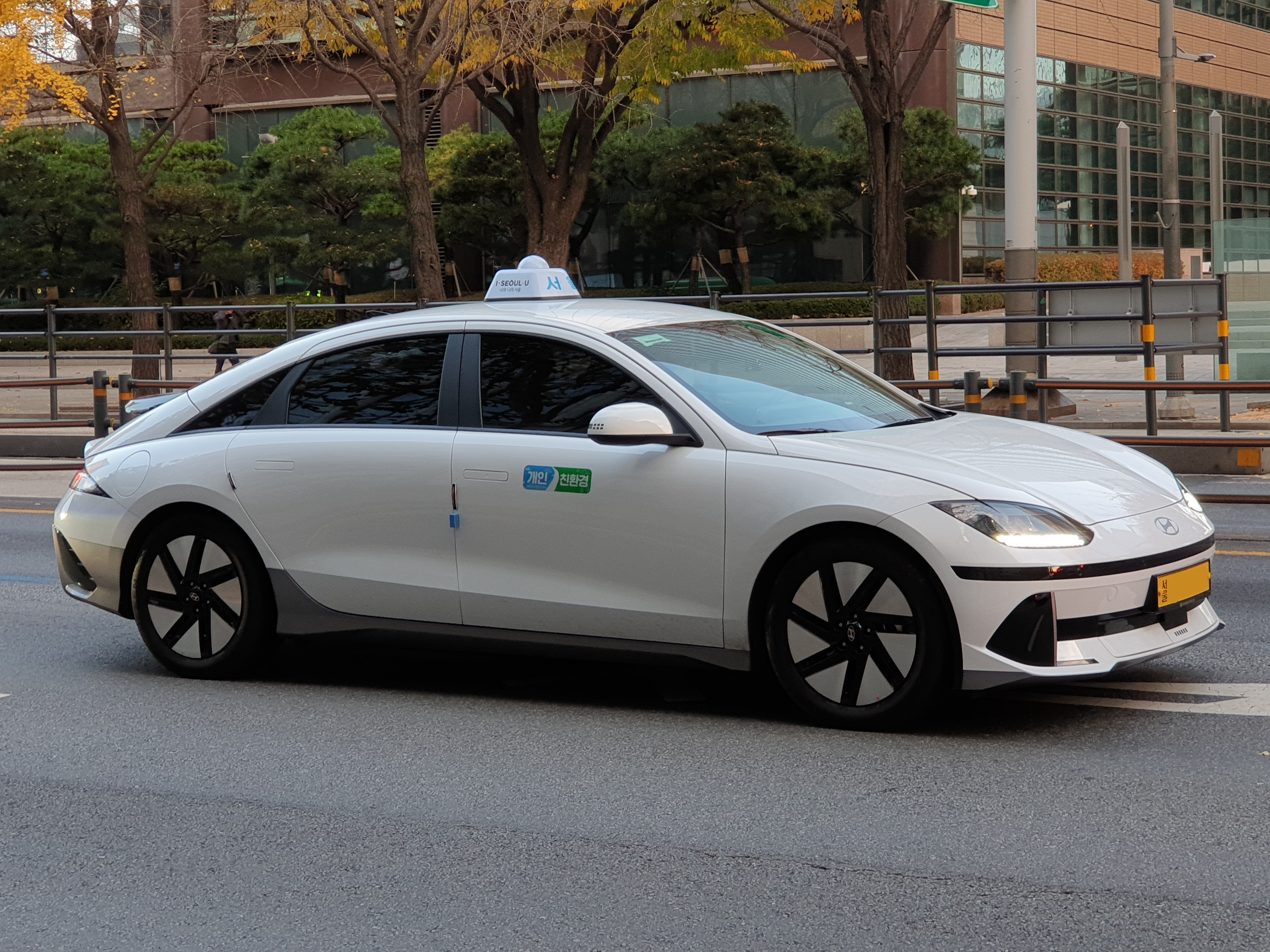
Hyundai Ioniq 6 taxi in Seoul

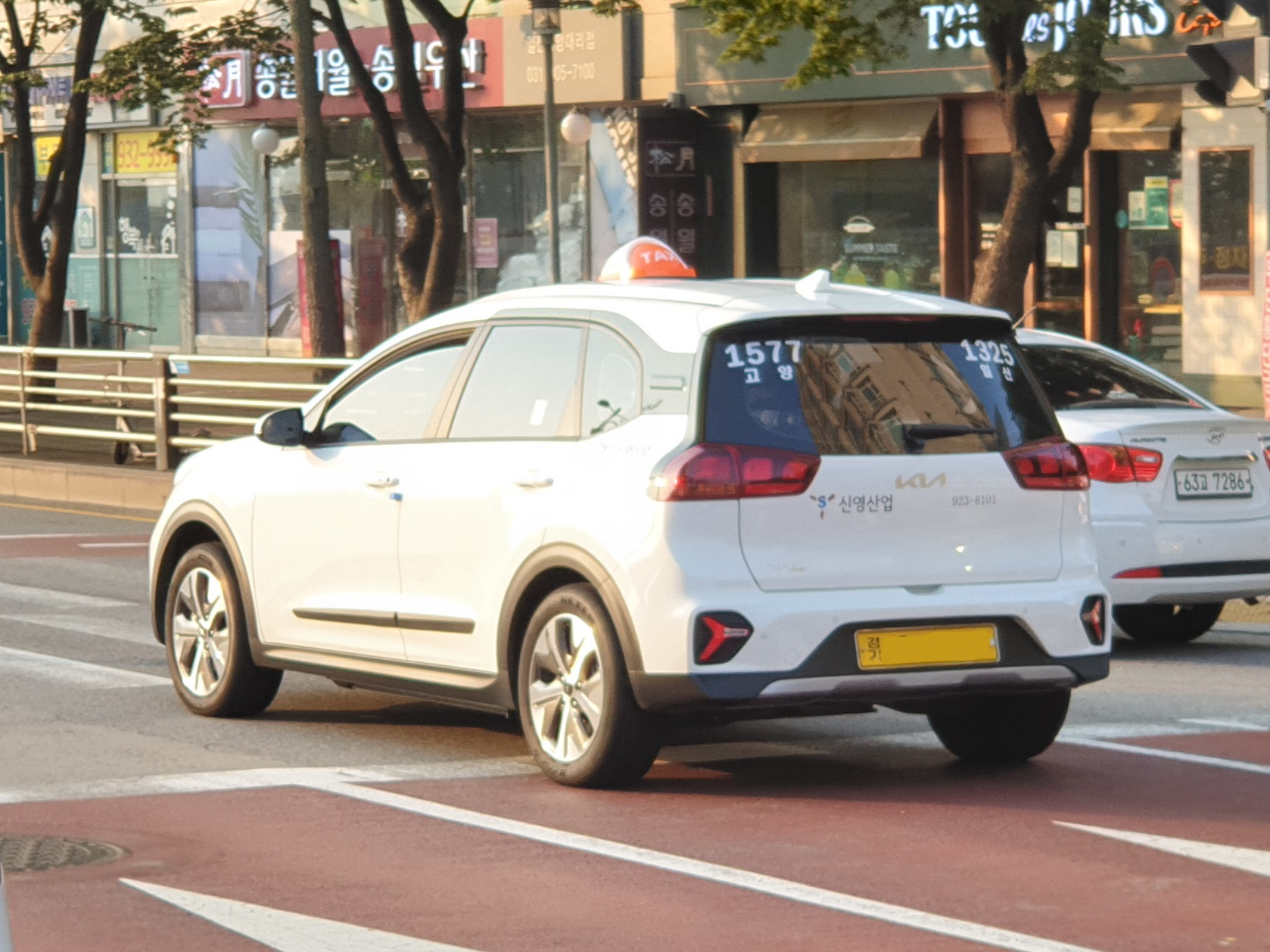
Kia Niro Plus electric compact SUV taxi

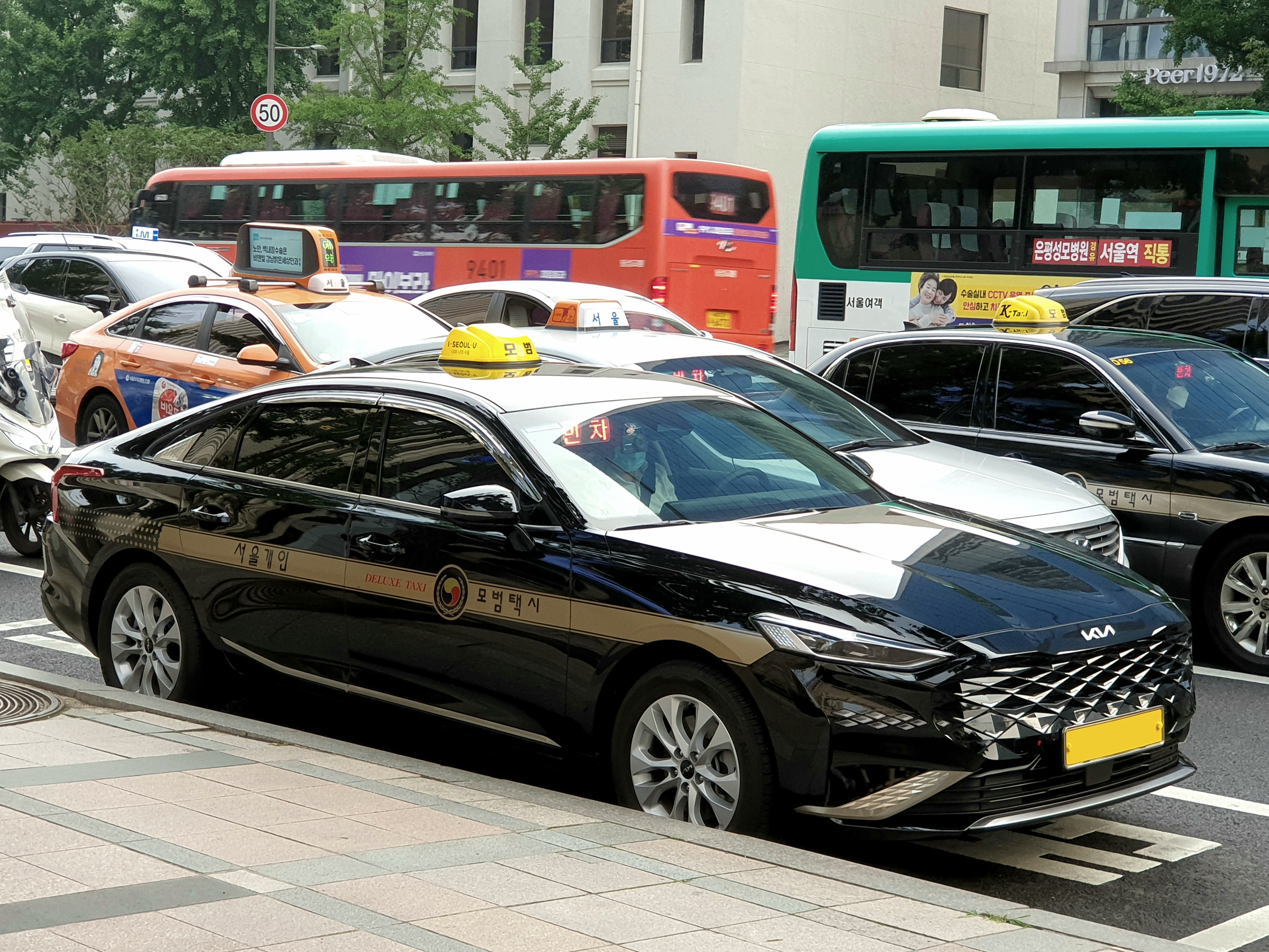
Kia K8 deluxe taxi

In South Korea, taxis have a service life of 4 to 9 years depending on engine displacement. In the case of private taxis, vehicles with an engine displacement of less than 2,400 cc are valid for 7 years, and vehicles with an engine displacement of 2,400 cc or more are valid for 9 years. After a safety inspection every 6 months, an extension is determined which can permit 2 more years. Private taxis with an engine displacement of 2,400 cc or more can be used for up to 11 years.

From 2021 to 2023, 33,400 taxis, or 30% of newly registered taxis, were electric vehicles; during this period, the most-registered electric vehicle taxis were the Hyundai Ioniq 5, Kia EV6, Niro Plus, Hyundai Ioniq 6, Kia Niro EV, and the Hyundai Kona Electric. Corporate taxi companies must have at least 50 vehicles in Seoul and Busan, at least 30 vehicles in metropolitan cities and municipalities, and at least 10 vehicles in counties. According to a 2020 survey by Seoul City, the average daily distance traveled by taxis of the city is 240.2 km.

=== Medium taxi ===
Medium taxis (중형택시) account for 99% of taxis in South Korea. They have engines of 1,600 cc or more and seating for 5 or fewer people. Mainly used are Hyundai Sonata, Ioniq 5, Ioniq 6, Kia K5, and EV6.

=== Large taxi ===
Large taxi (대형택시) vehicles must be automobiles with a displacement of 2,000 cc or more and can seat 6 to 10 people, or passenger vehicles with a displacement of 2,000 cc or more and can seat 13 people or less. The drivers must have a taxi license with at least five years of accident-free driving experience. Mainly used are Hyundai Starex and Kia Carnival.

=== Luxury taxi ===
Luxury taxis (고급택시) were introduced in November 2015. Vehicles with an engine displacement of 2,800 cc or more, such as Genesis vehicles, Hyundai Equus, and Kia K9, are used. There is no need to display lights indicating that it is a taxi on the outside of the taxi, and there is no obligation to install a meter if there is a mobile app. In Daegu, loitering or airport/station waiting services are prohibited and must be operated on a reservation basis. Drivers must complete at least 16 hours of service training every year.

=== Others ===
Light taxis (경형택시) have an engine displacement of less than 1,000 cc, and compact taxis (소형택시) have an engine displacement of less than 1,600 cc.

== Taxi fare ==
Basic fares in major cities are as follows:

| City | Basic fare | Update |
|---|---|---|
| Seoul | ₩4,800 | February 2023 |
| Busan | ₩4,800 | June 2023 |
| Incheon | ₩4,800 | July 2023 |
| Daegu | ₩4,000 | February 2023 |
| Daejeon | ₩4,300 | July 2023 |
| Gwangju | ₩4,300 | July 2023 |
| Ulsan | ₩4,500 | May 2025 |
| Sejong | ₩4,000 | August 2024 |
| Jeju | ₩4,300 | July 2024 |

== Taxi vehicles ==
=== Present ===
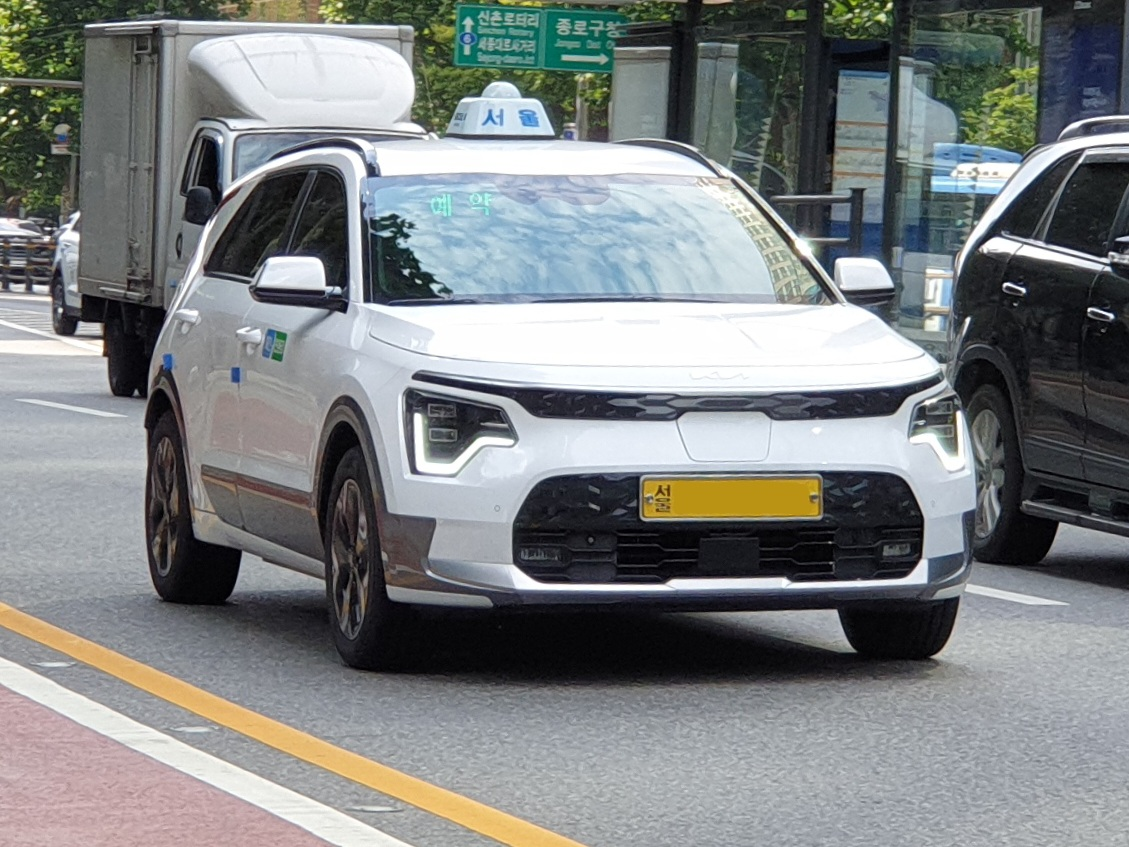
Kia Niro EV

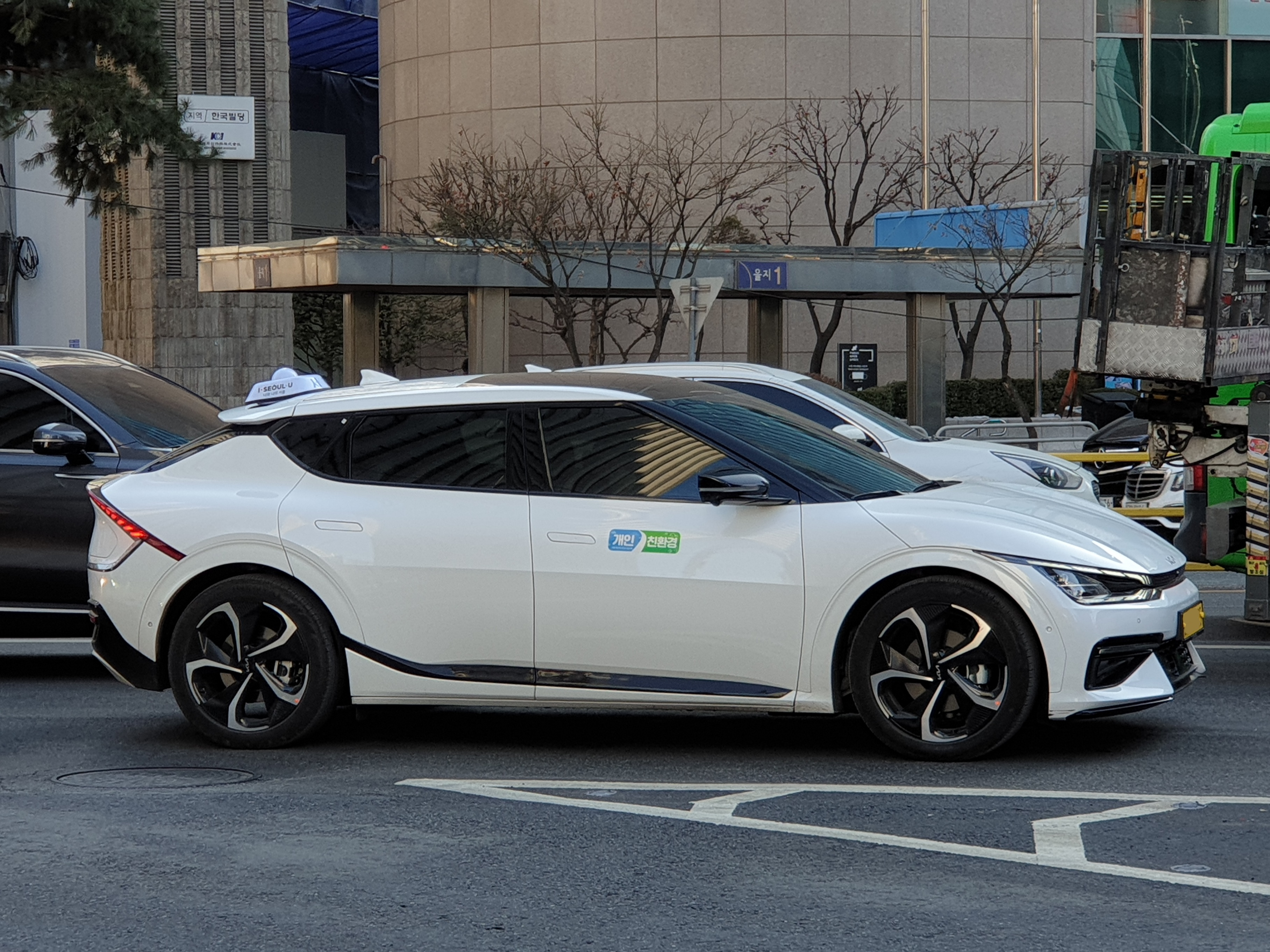
Kia EV6 GT Line

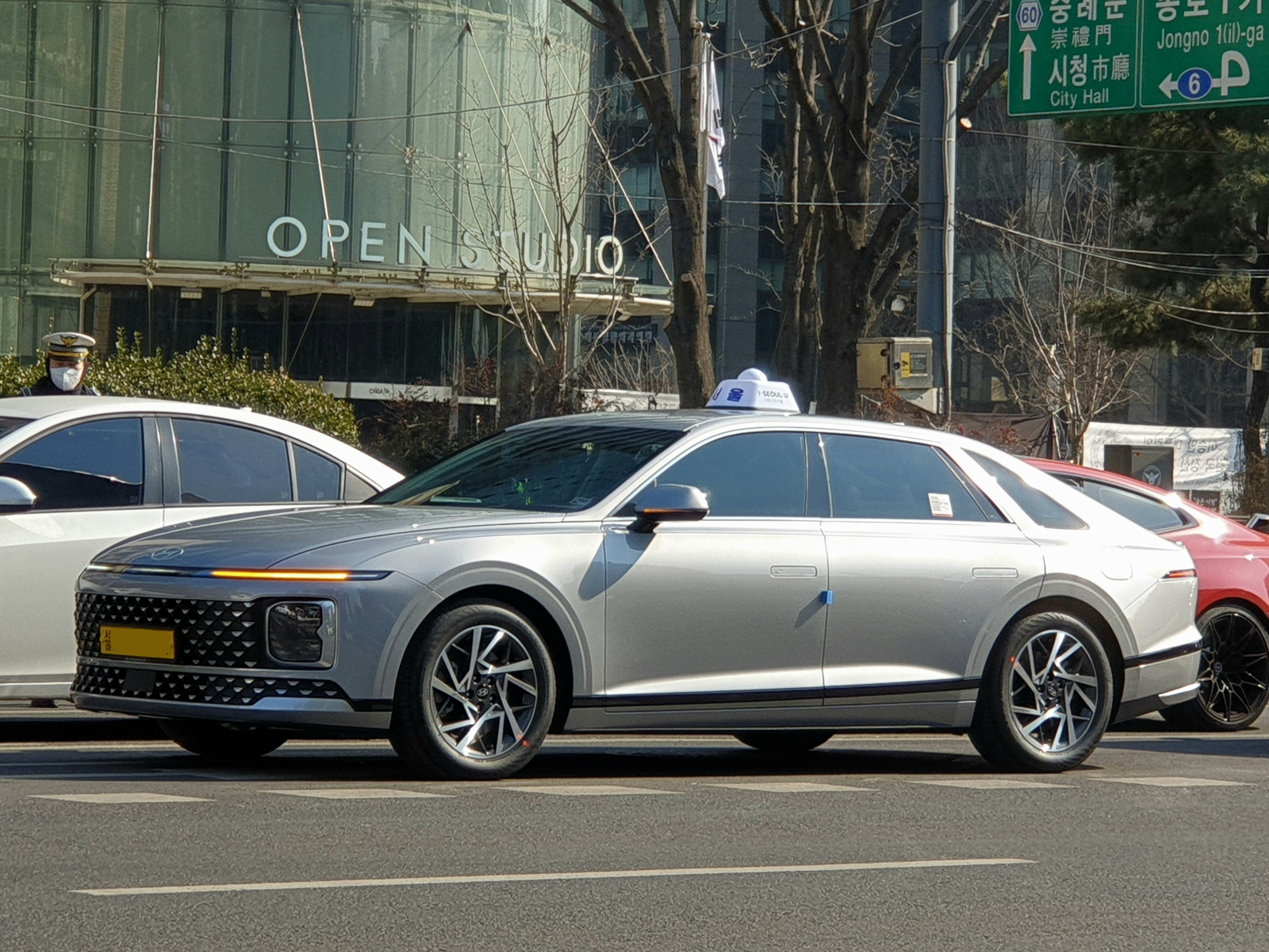
Hyundai Grandeur GN7

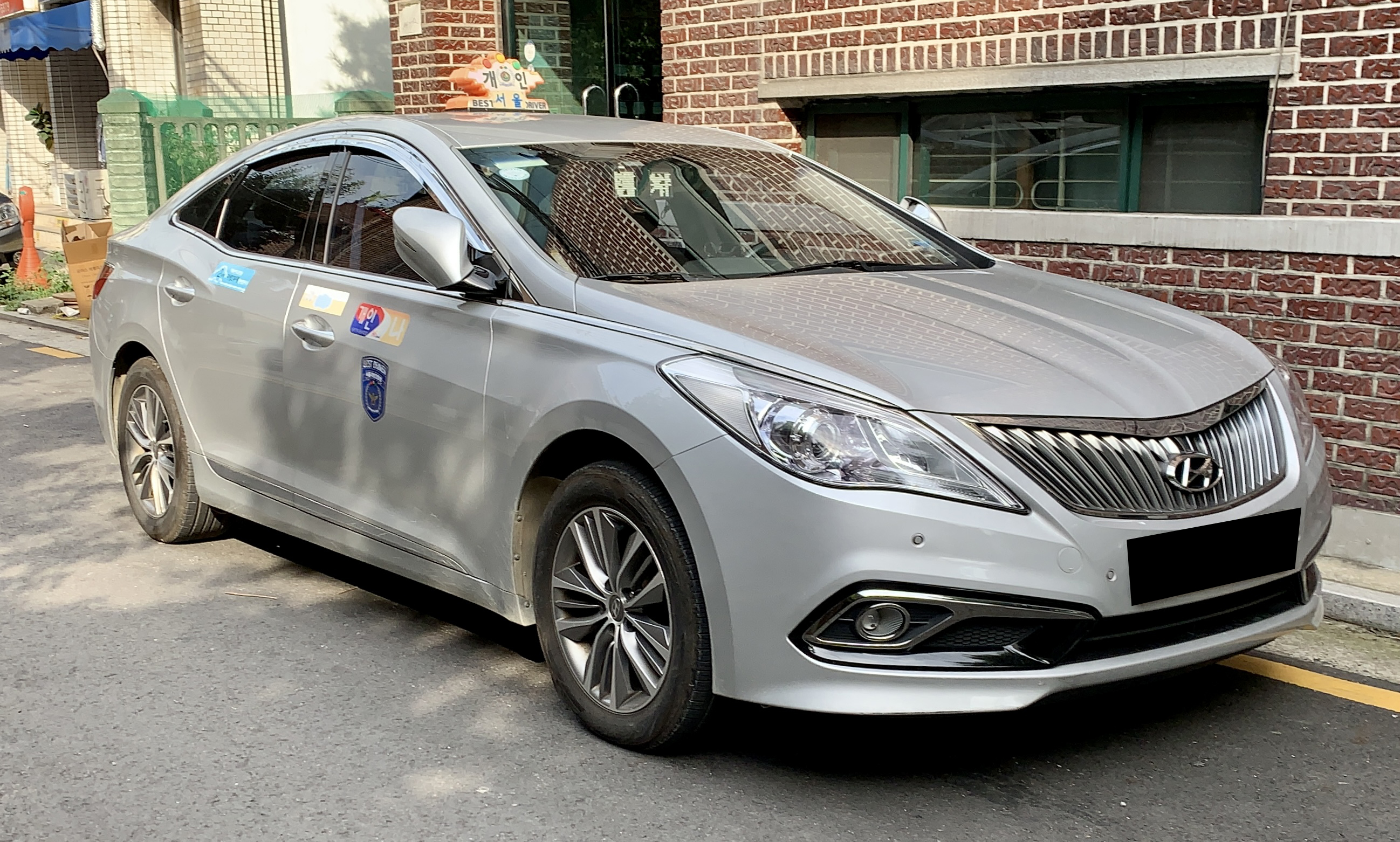
Hyundai Grandeur HG

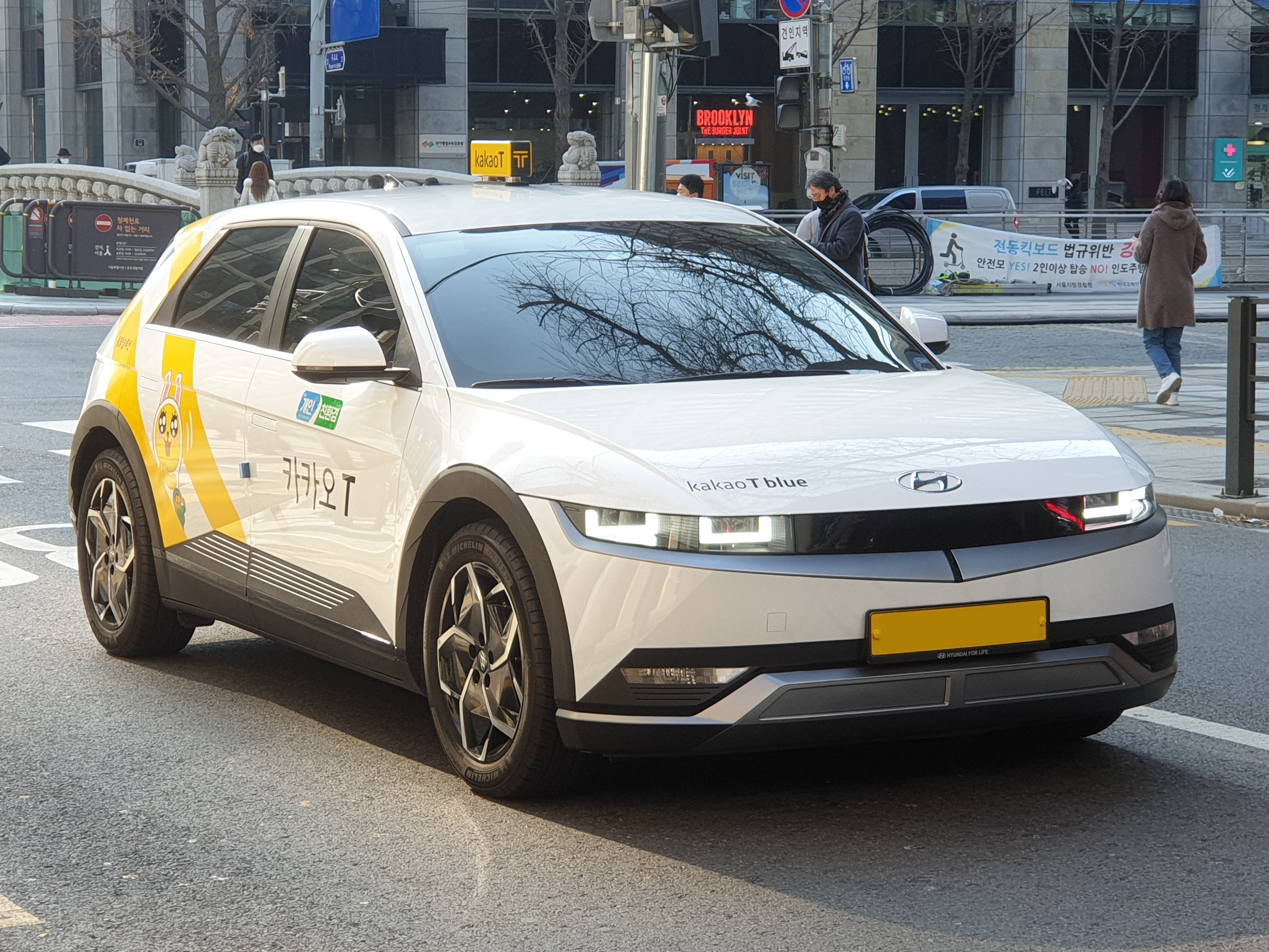
Hyundai Ioniq 5

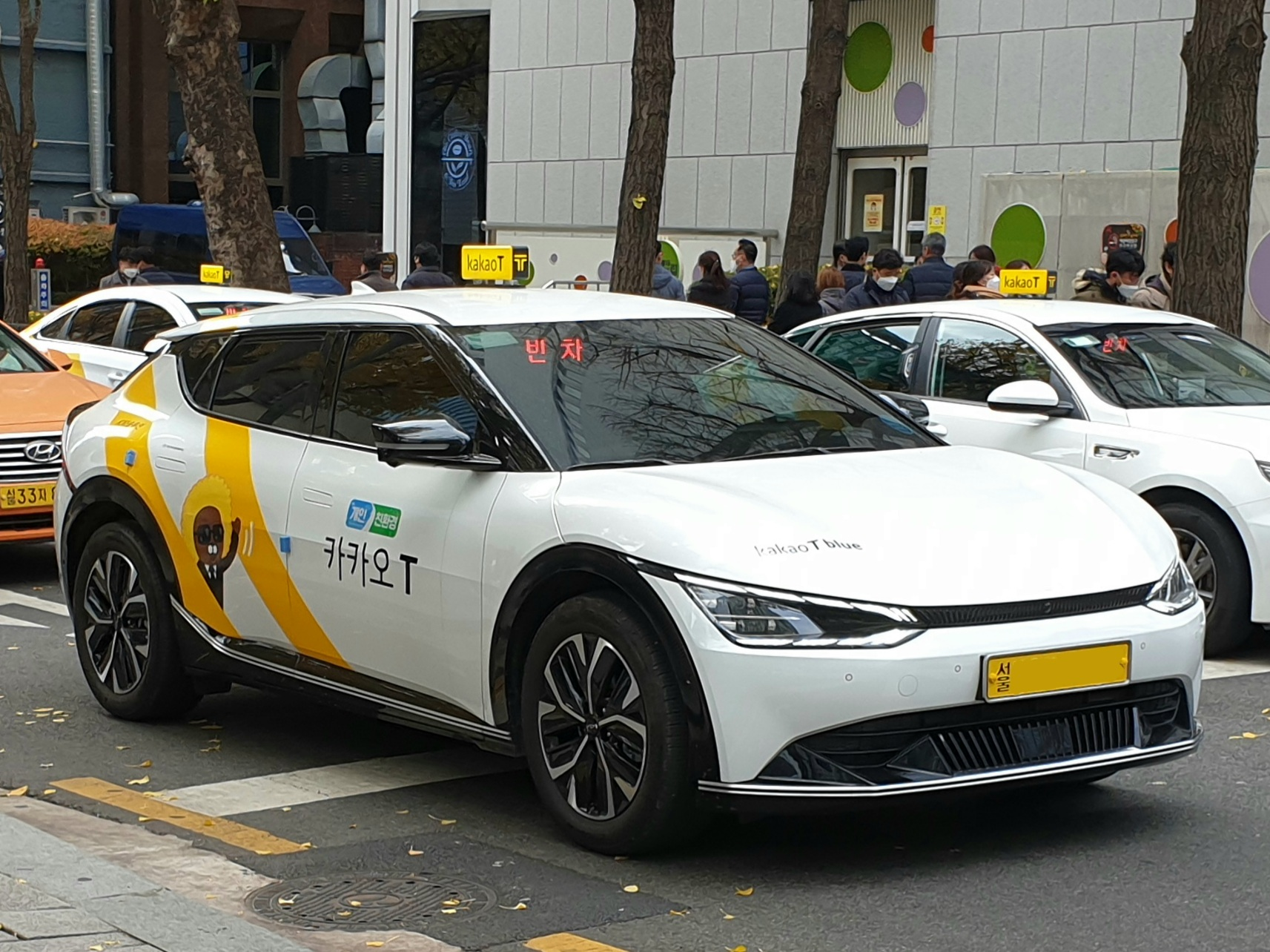
Kia EV6

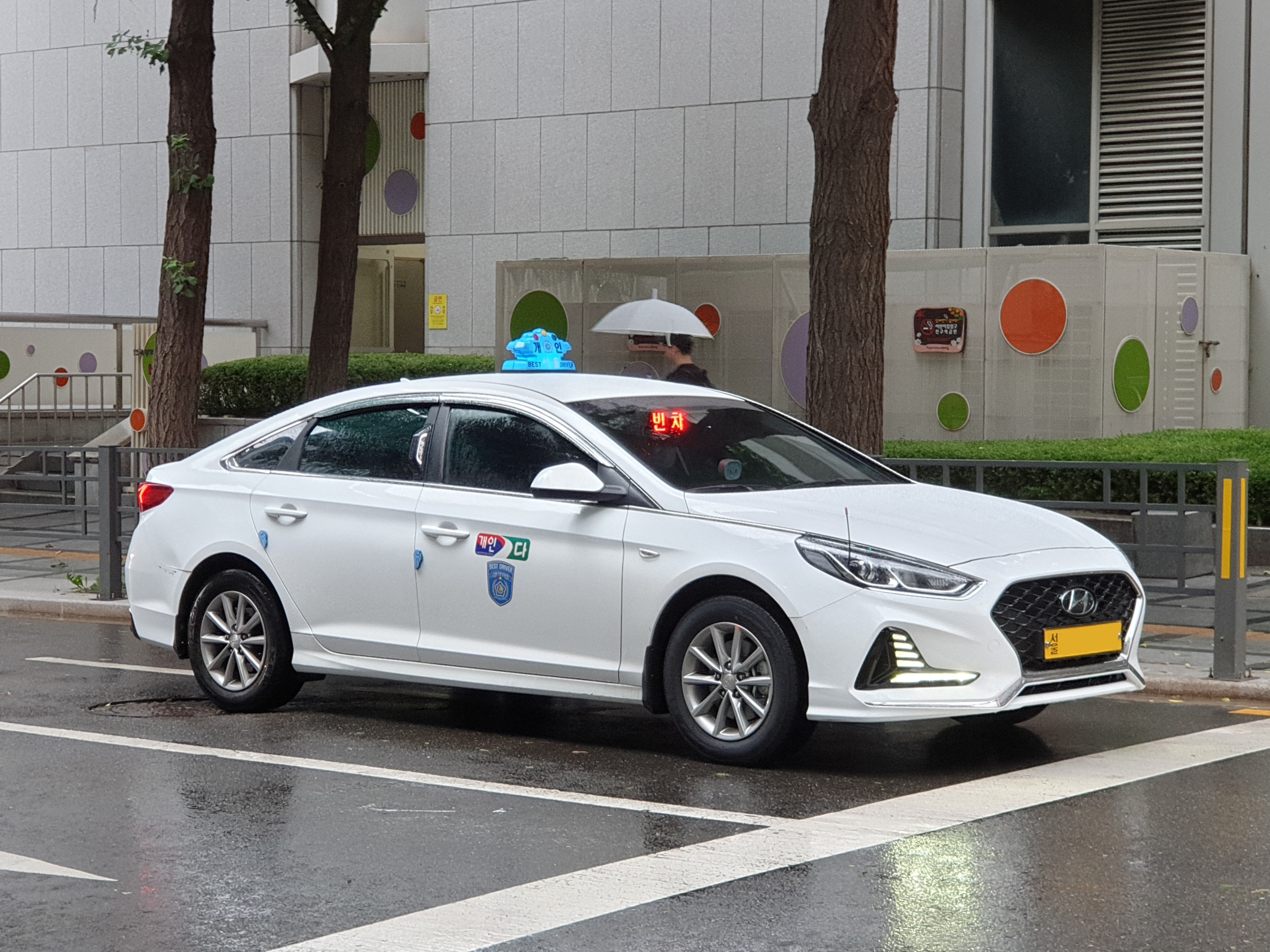
Hyundai Sonata DN8

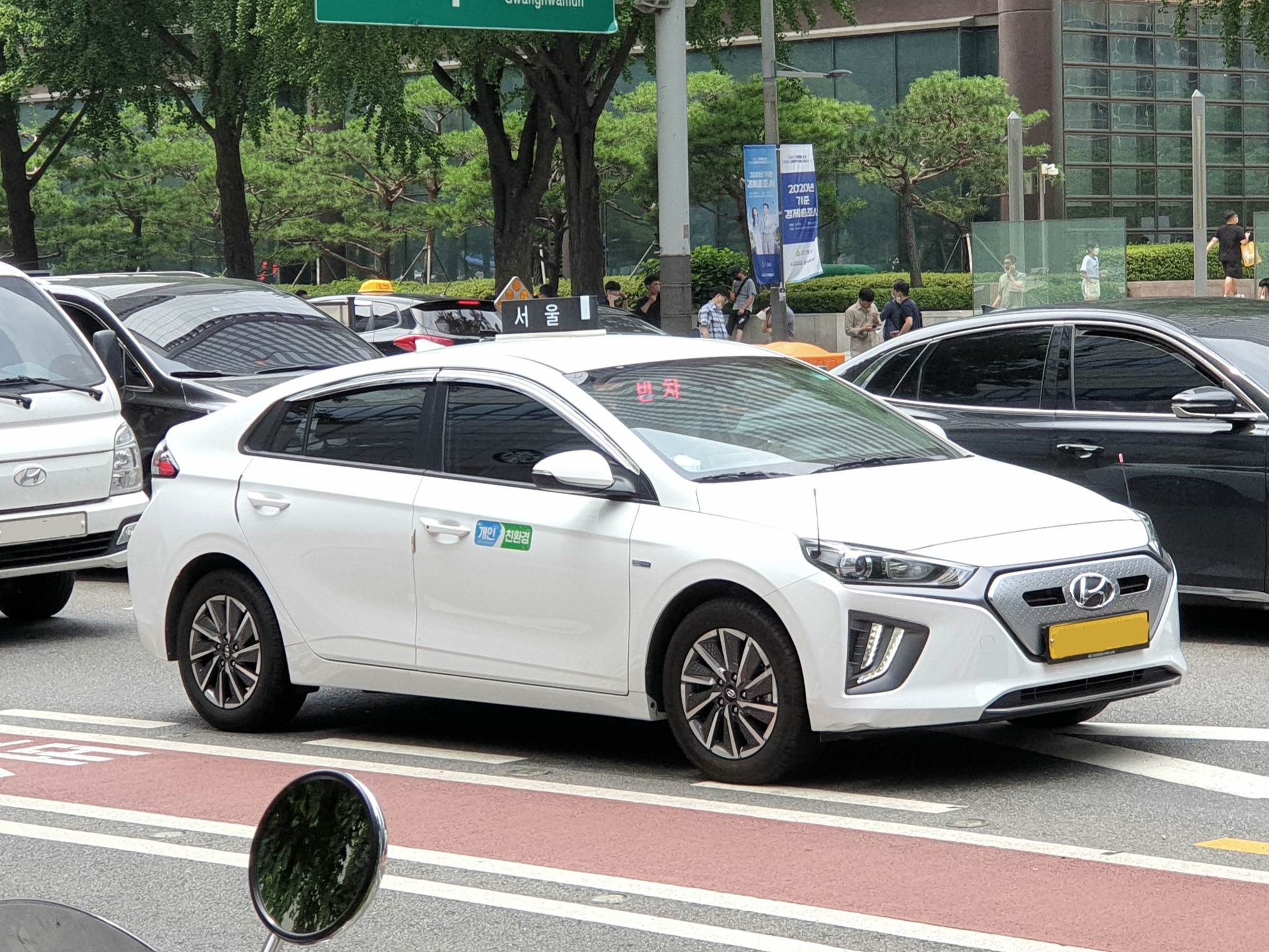
Hyundai Ioniq Electric

=== Past ===
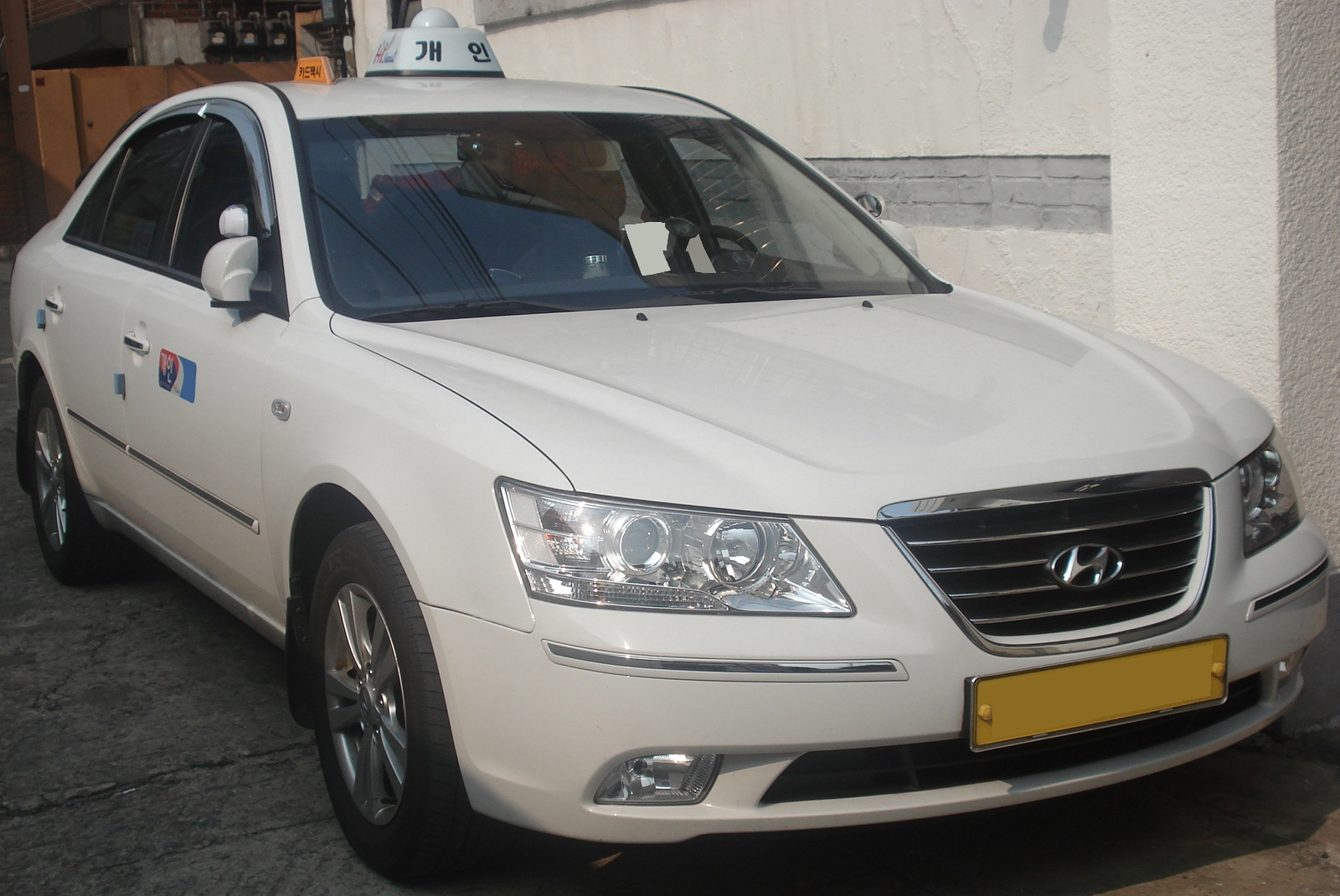
Hyundai Sonata NF

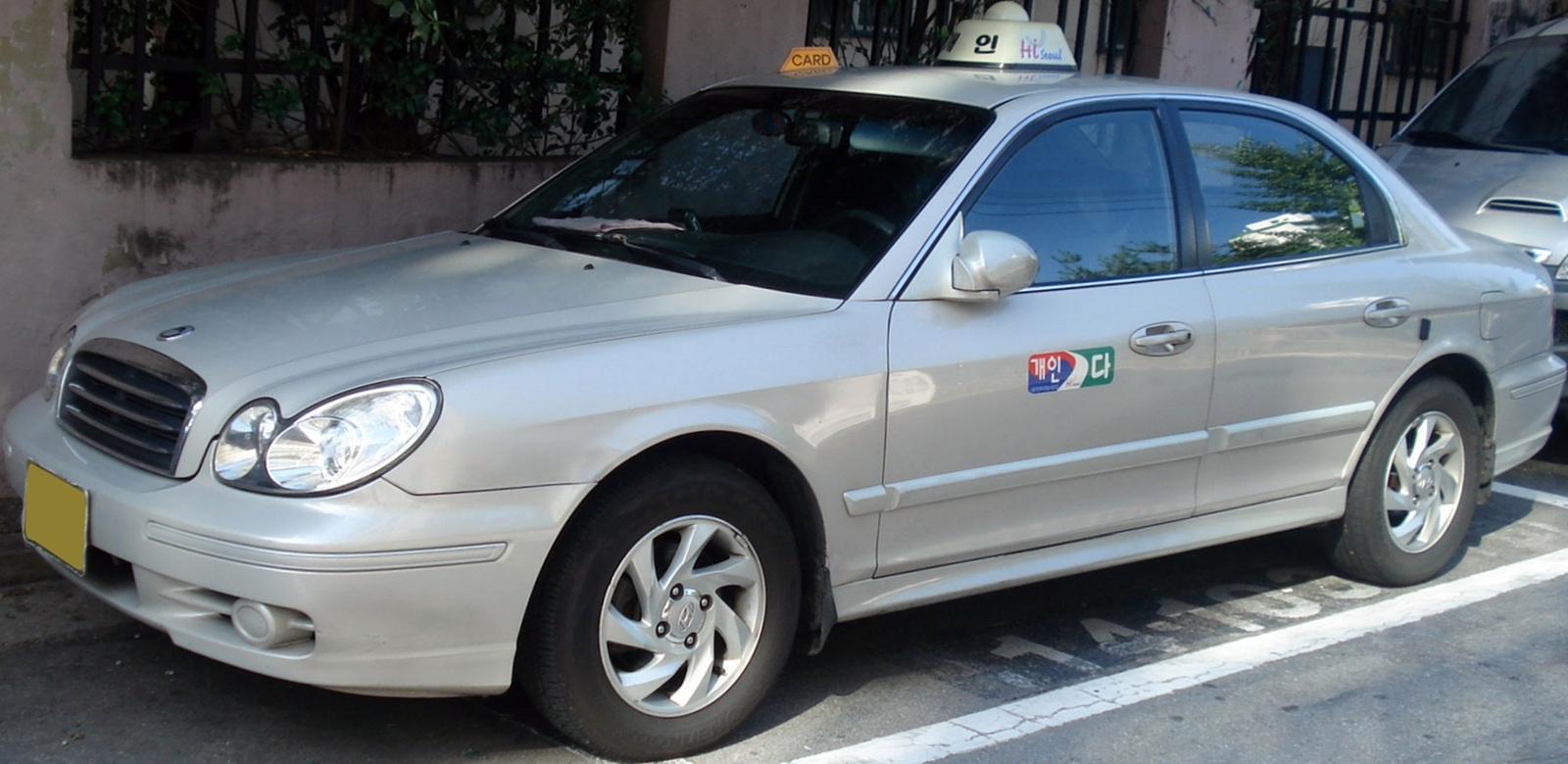
Hyundai Sonata EF

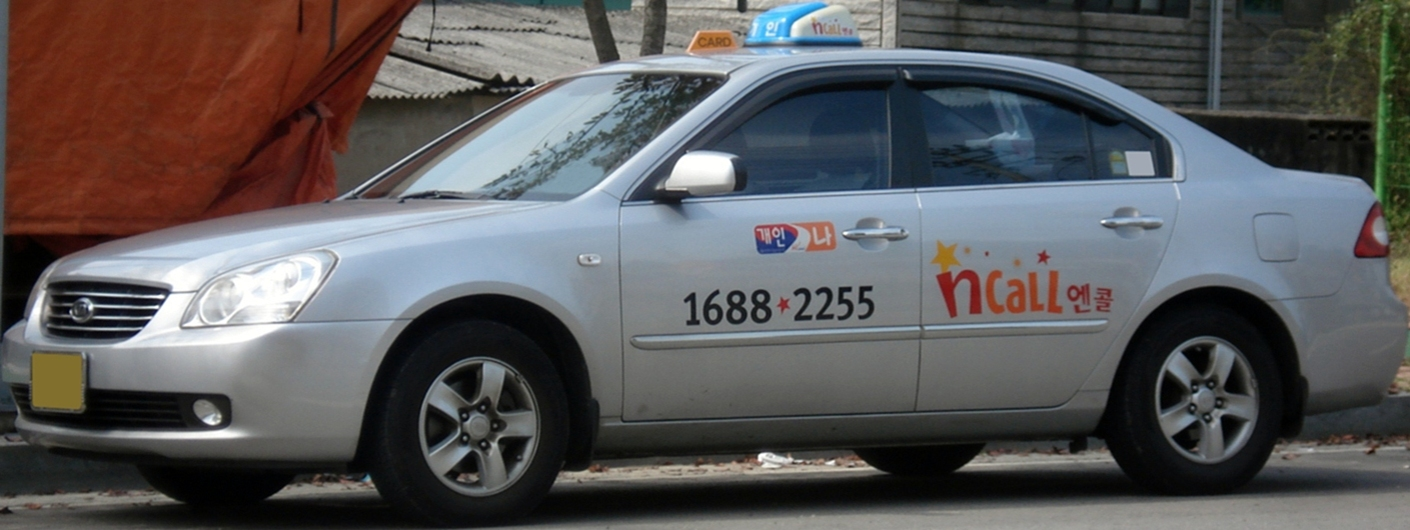
Kia Lotze

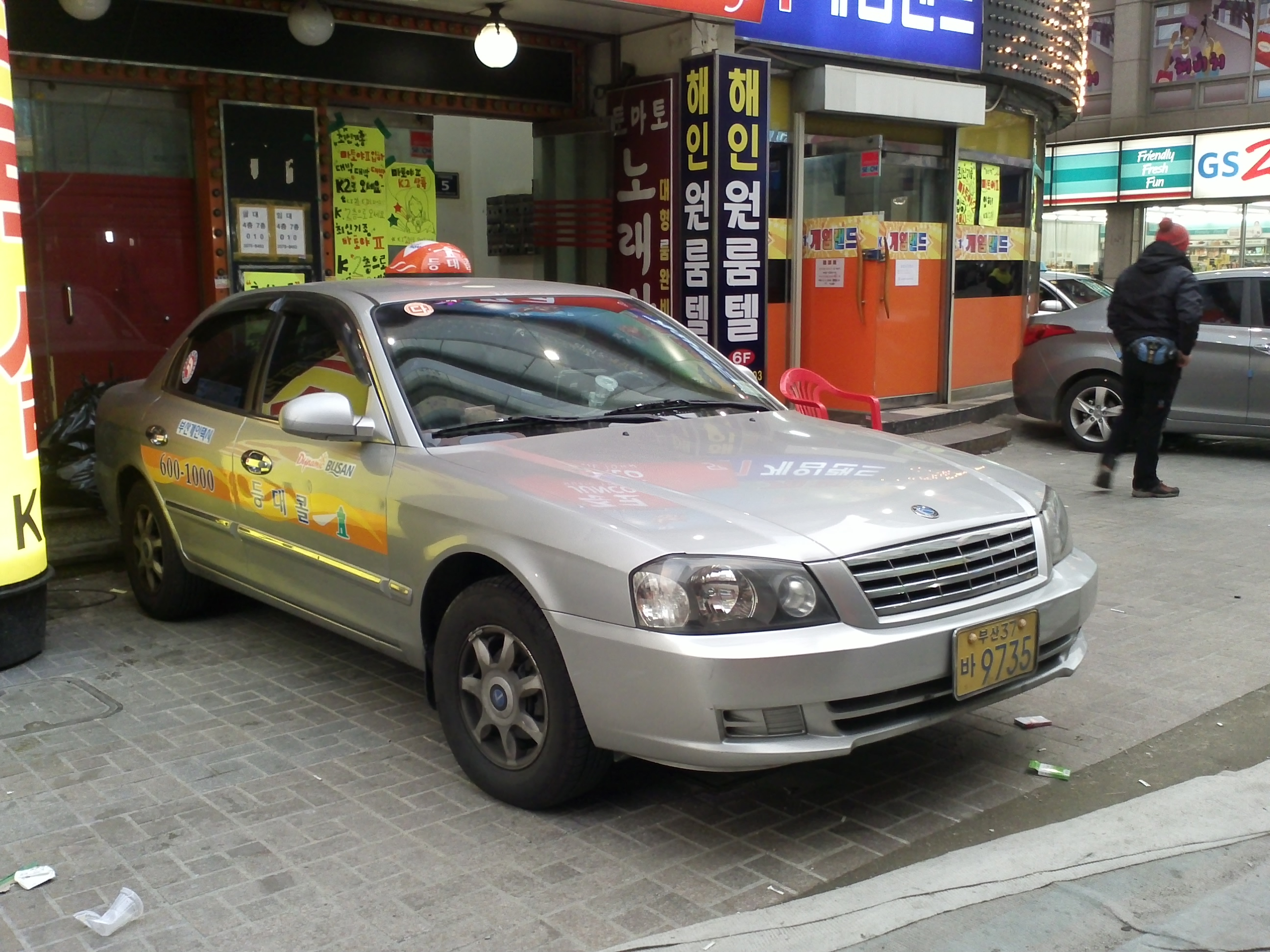
Kia Optima MS
