= Kia Niro =

Subcompact crossover SUV

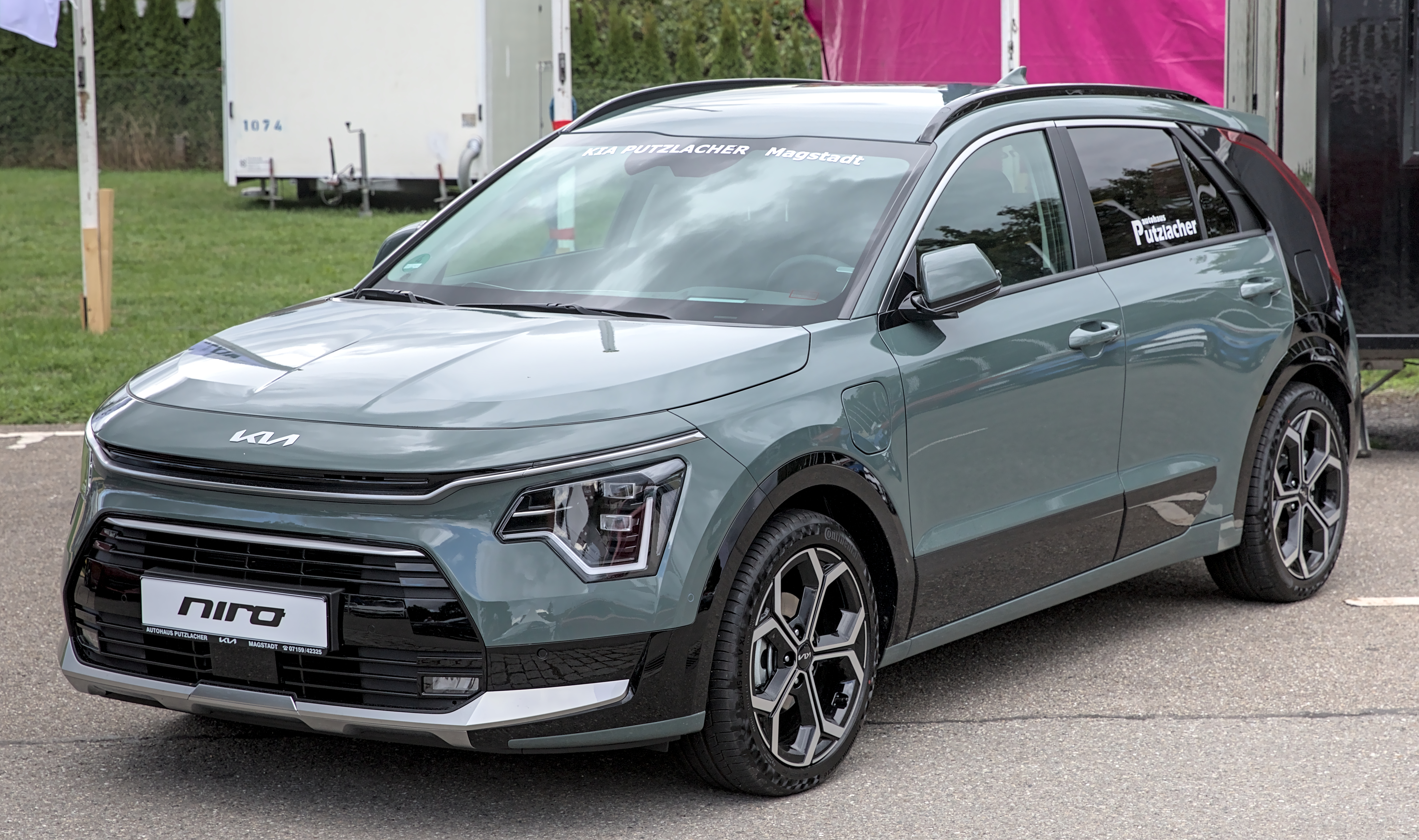
- Kia Niro PHEV (SG2)

Overview
- Manufacturer: Kia
- Production: 2016–present
- Model years: 2017–present

Body and chassis
- Class: Subcompact crossover SUV
- Body style: 5-door SUV
- Layout: Front-engine, front-wheel-drive; Front-motor, front-wheel-drive (EV)

The Kia Niro (Korean: 기아 니로) is a subcompact crossover SUV (B-segment) manufactured by Kia since 2016. It is an electrification-focused vehicle, offering three versions: hybrid, plug-in hybrid (until 2026) and battery electric (until 2026) variants.

== First generation (DE; 2016) ==
First generation
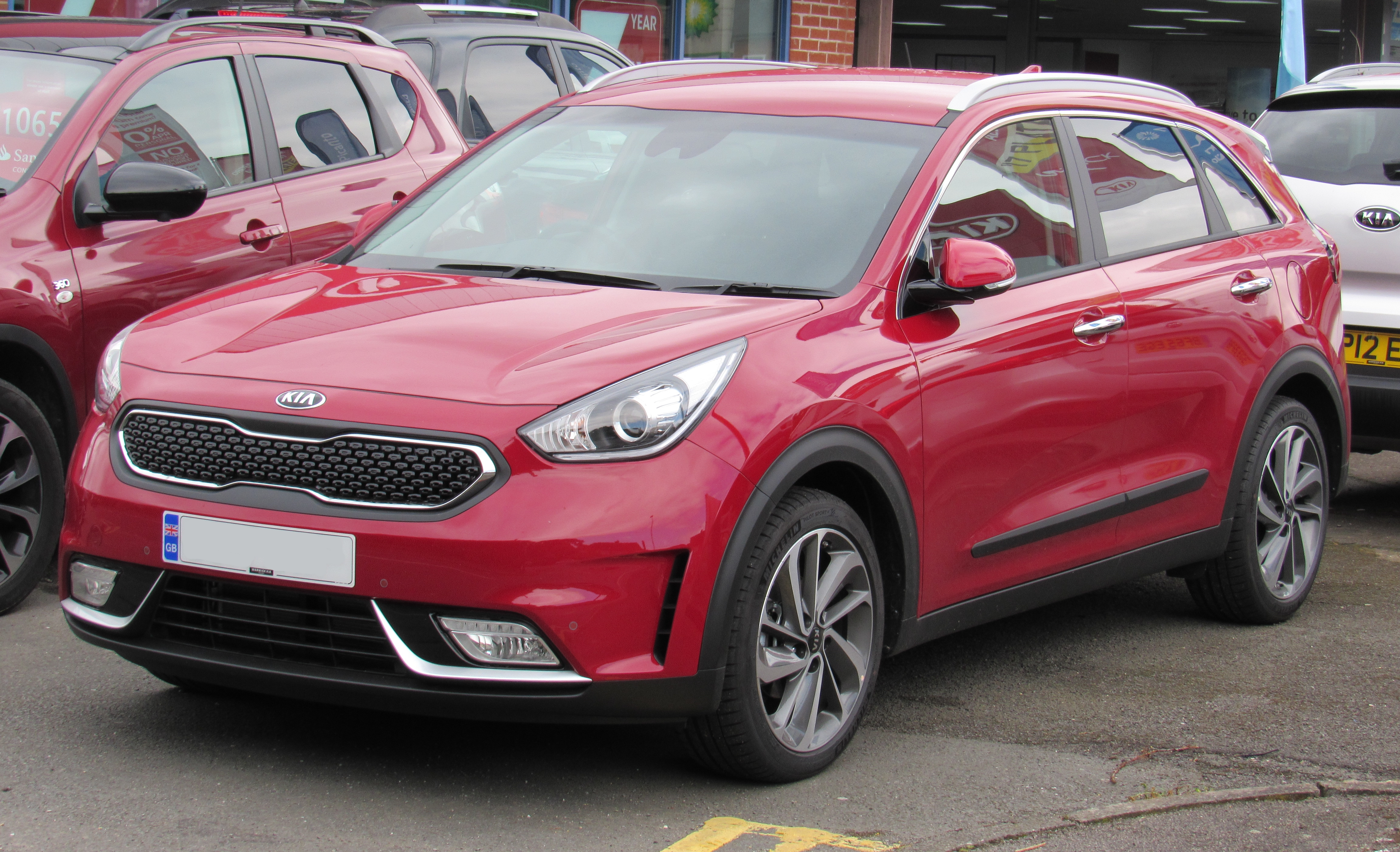
- 2017 Niro Hybrid (pre-facelift)

Overview
- Model code: DE
- Production: 2016–2022 (Niro); 2022–2024 (Niro Plus)
- Model years: 2017–2022
- Assembly: South Korea: Hwaseong, Gyeonggi (Hwaseong Plant); Seosan (Donghee, Niro Plus)
- Designer: Sang-Hun Ahn; Jae-Hyeok Ho (Niro EV); Hyun-Kyung Song (facelift)

Body and chassis
- Platform: Eco-Car platform
- Related: Hyundai Ioniq

Powertrain
- Engine: Petrol hybrid: 1.6 L Kappa II GDi I4; Petrol plug-in hybrid: 1.6 L Kappa II GDi I4
- Electric motor: AC Synchronous Permanent Magnet Motor (hybrid and PHEV); Permanent Magnet Synchronous Motor
- Power output: 100 kW (134 hp) (39.2 kWh, EV); 150 kW (201 hp) (64 kWh, EV)
- Transmission: 6-speed D6KF1 dual-clutch (hybrid and PHEV); 1-speed reduction gear (EV)
- Hybrid drivetrain: Parallel hybrid; PHEV
- Battery: 1.56 kWh lithium-ion polymer battery (hybrid); 8.9 kWh lithium-ion polymer battery (PHEV)
- Electric range: 288 km (179 mi) (39.2 kWh, EV) (WLTP); 455 km (283 mi) (64 kWh, EV) (WLTP)

Dimensions
- Wheelbase: 2,700 mm (106.3 in)
- Length: 4,355 mm (171.5 in); 4,375–4,385 mm (172.2–172.6 in) (EV)
- Width: 1,805 mm (71.1 in)
- Height: 1,545 mm (60.8 in); 1,560–1,640 mm (61.4–64.6 in) (EV)
- Curb weight: 1,414–1,490 kg (3,117–3,285 lb) (hybrid); 1,538–1,594 kg (3,391–3,514 lb) (PHEV); 1,667–1,812 kg (3,675–3,995 lb) (EV)

The first-generation Niro was introduced in 2016. Based on the same platform as the Hyundai Ioniq, Kia opted to use dual-clutch transmission instead of the more traditional continuously variable transmission found in most other hybrids to offer a more engaging driving experience.

The size is between the Stonic and Sportage, and very close to the XCeed. In Europe, the Niro was launched in a choice of seven colours and either 16- or 18-inch wheels. It was the first Kia model to feature Android Auto, available from its launch, while Apple CarPlay was made available towards the end of 2016. Seven airbags were included as standard, along with other safety features including autonomous braking, smart cruise control, and lane departure warning. Noise reduction was a key development focus, with Kia achieving a quieter cabin by use of increased front structure insulation and the use of acoustic windshield glass.

Full production started in May 2016 in Hwaseong, Gyeonggi, South Korea, with European sales from the third quarter of 2016.

A plug-in version was launched in the United Kingdom in the end of 2017, and in the United States in the beginning of 2018, with an electric version launched in 2018. Towards the end of 2018 and start of 2019, sales of the Niro PHEV ranked highly in Denmark and Sweden in a list of top plug-in car sales.

The Niro received a facelift in 2019 which included changes to the front and rear bumpers, as well as new headlights and color choices. Unlike the prototypes, no production version was ever offered with four wheel drive.

=== Hybrid (HEV) ===
The 2017 Kia Niro Hybrid was unveiled at the 2016 Chicago Auto Show. A subcompact hybrid utility vehicle, the model's exterior design is marketed as "un-hybrid", saying it is more conventional than other hybrid cars.

The Niro uses a hybrid powertrain producing altogether 104 kW (139 hp), and returns a fuel economy of 5.5 to 4.7 L/100 km (43 to 50 mpg_{‑US}) by also using lightweight materials, including high strength steel and aluminium. Its traction battery has a capacity of 1.56 kWh which weighs 33 kilograms (73 lb), with Kia claiming that this offers up to 50 per cent increased energy density and 13 per cent more energy efficiency than rivals. From 2017 onwards, the hybrid does not feature a conventional lead-acid starter 12-volt battery; instead, a 12-volt lithium battery is housed adjacent to the traction battery. This innovation saves weight and maintenance.

In its first month on sale, the Niro hit an all time sales record in the green car market in South Korea, even beating the Hyundai Ioniq.

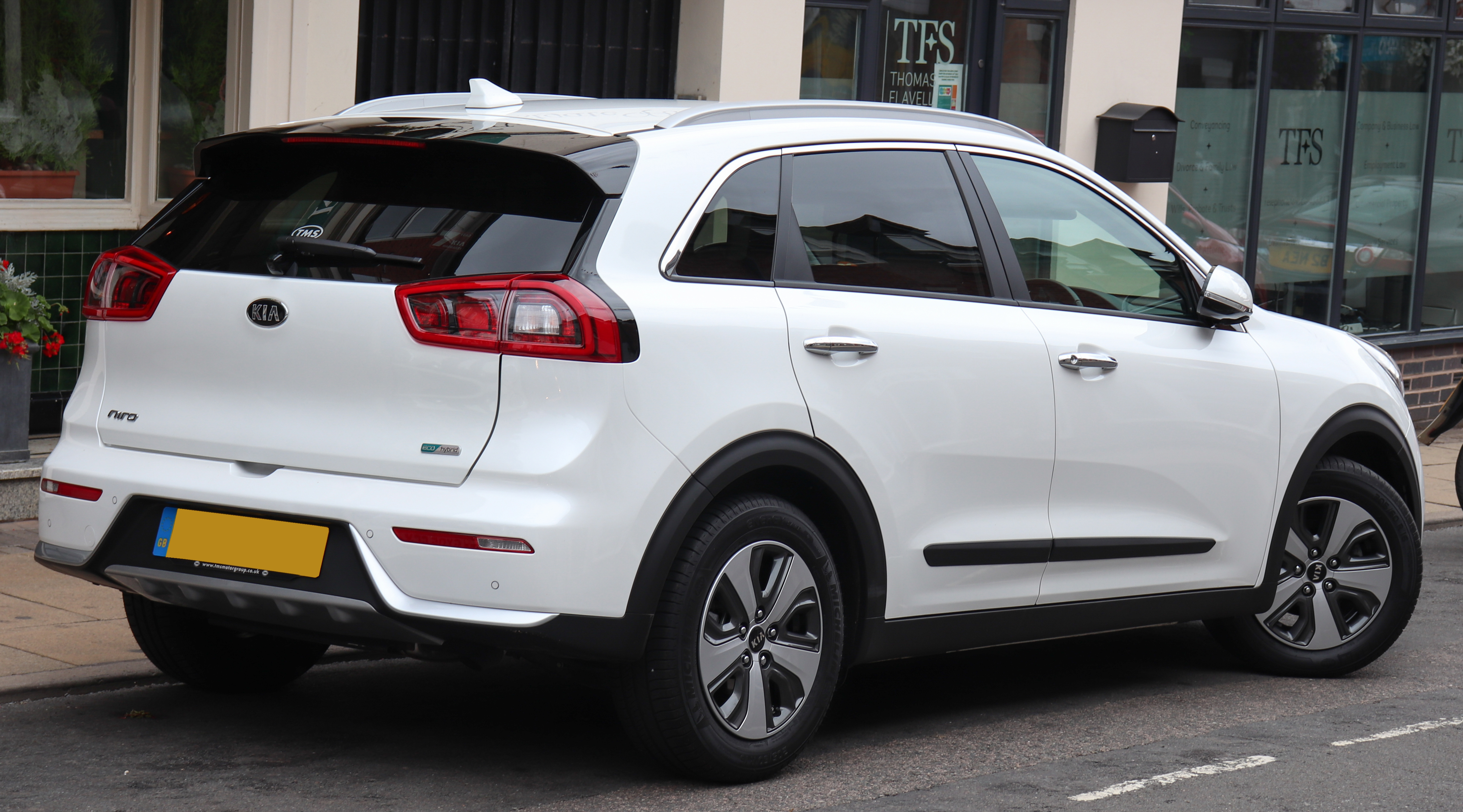
2017 Niro Hybrid (pre-facelift)

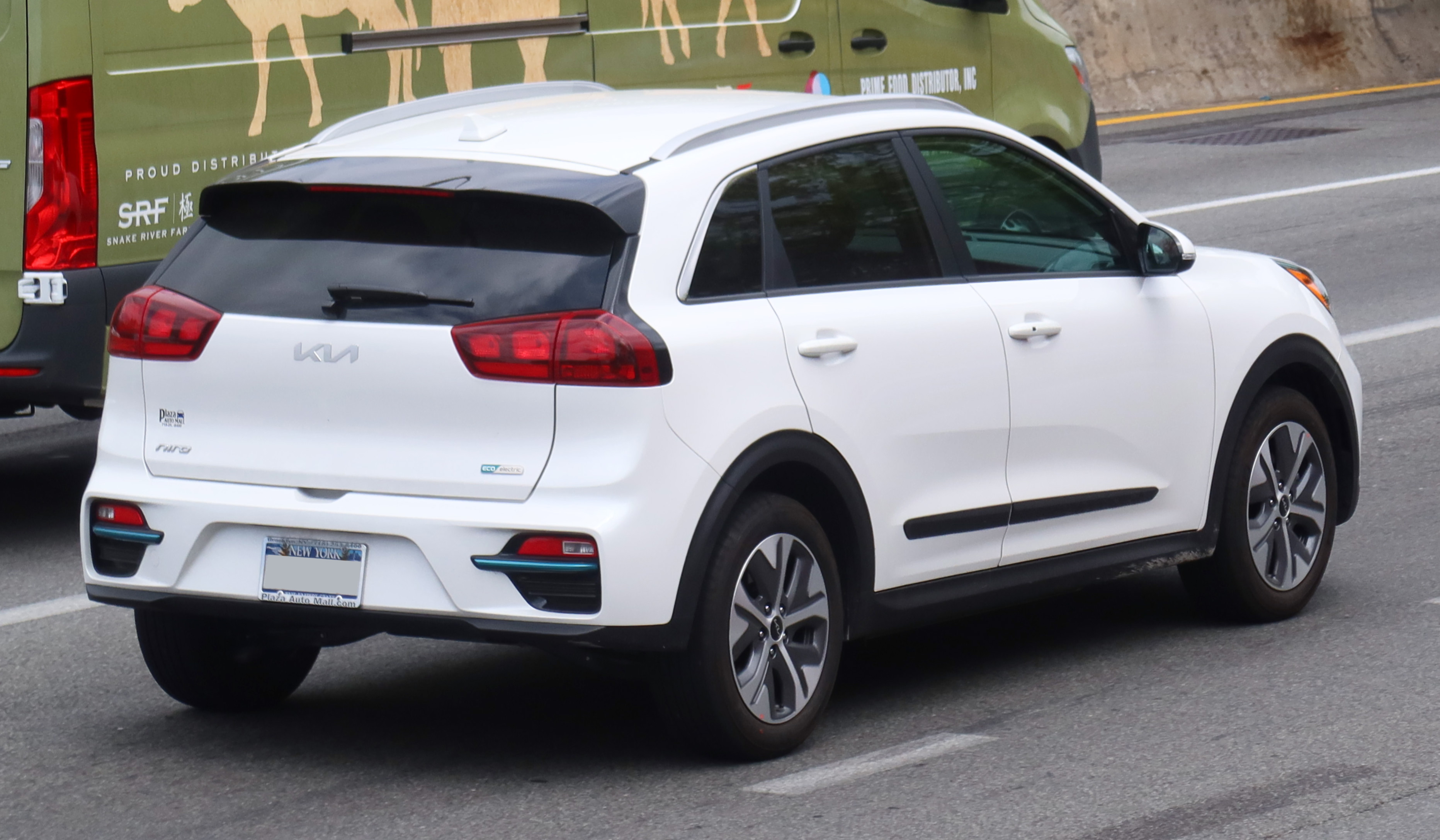
2022 Niro Hybrid (facelift)

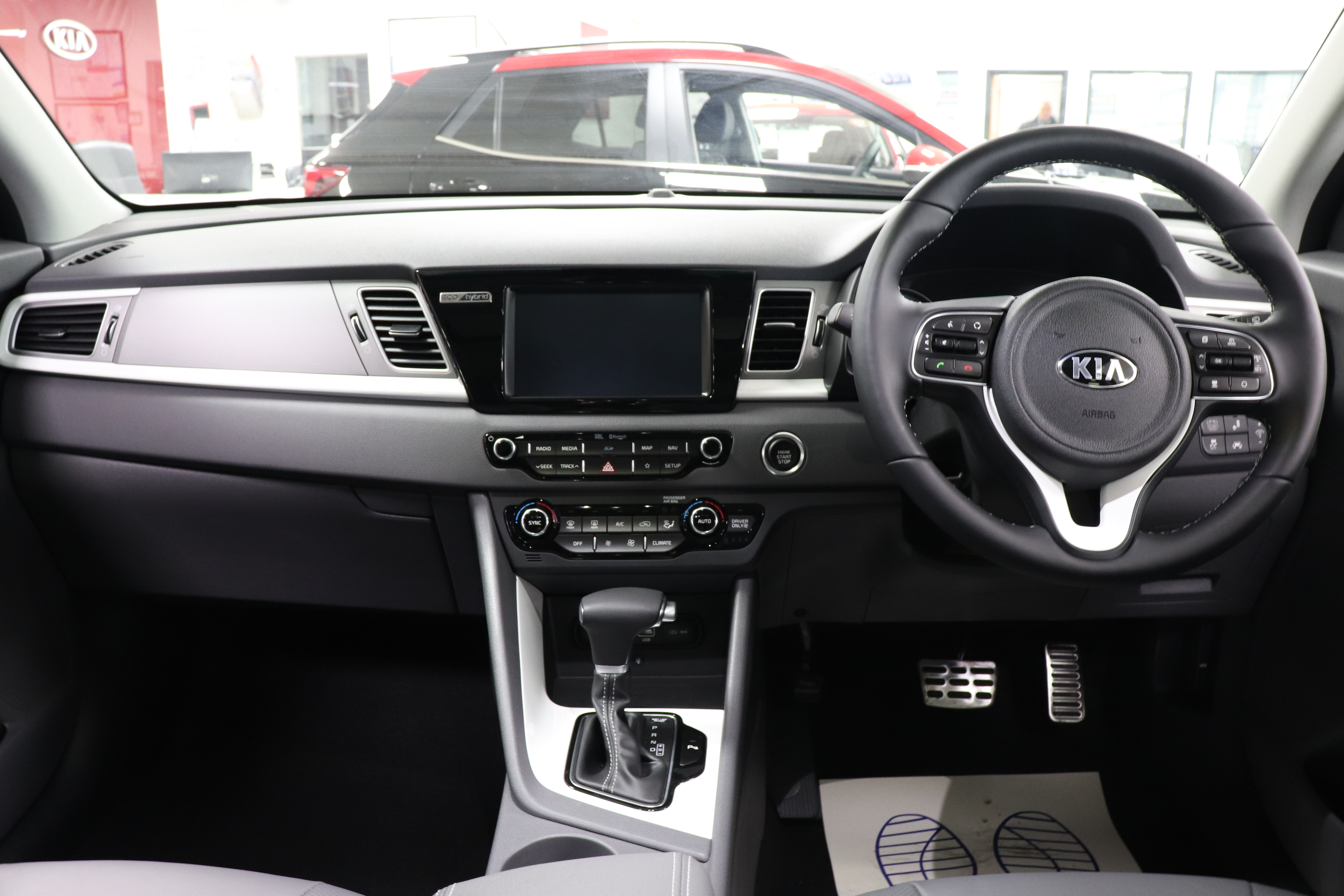
Interior (RHD)

=== Plug-in hybrid (PHEV) ===
A plug-in electric vehicle (PHEV) variant has been offered since September 2018, featuring an 8.9 kWh battery. The Kia Niro and Niro Plug in Hybrid form part of Kia hybrid range, that also includes the Optima Plug-in Hybrid and Optima Sportswagon Plug-in Hybrid. The Kia Niro went on sale in South Korea on 31 March 2016. The plug-in has the same dual-clutch transmission as the hybrid variant, an important differentiator from most other hybrid and plug-in hybrid vehicles which use a continuously variable transmission.

The Niro PHEV was the best selling plug-in car in Denmark in December 2018, with 1,113 sales representing a 24% share, ahead of the Nissan Leaf which took a 14% share respectively. In Sweden during February 2019, the Niro PHEV claimed 2nd position and share of 11%, behind the Mitsubishi Outlander PHEV with a 17% share. Although Kia claimed that the variant could obtain a fuel economy of 1.400 L/100 km; 168.0 mpg_{‑US} (201.8 mpg_{‑imp}), real-world tests suggested 1.96 L/100 km; 120 mpg_{‑US} (144 mpg_{‑imp}) in one test and 4.9 L/100 km; 48 mpg_{‑US} (58 mpg_{‑imp}) in another.

In 2019, Kia announced facelifted versions of its Niro hybrid variants, with new front and rear bumpers, lights and wheels among the changes to its line-up. LED headlights and fog lights became an optional extra, while two new colours red-orange and plum were added.

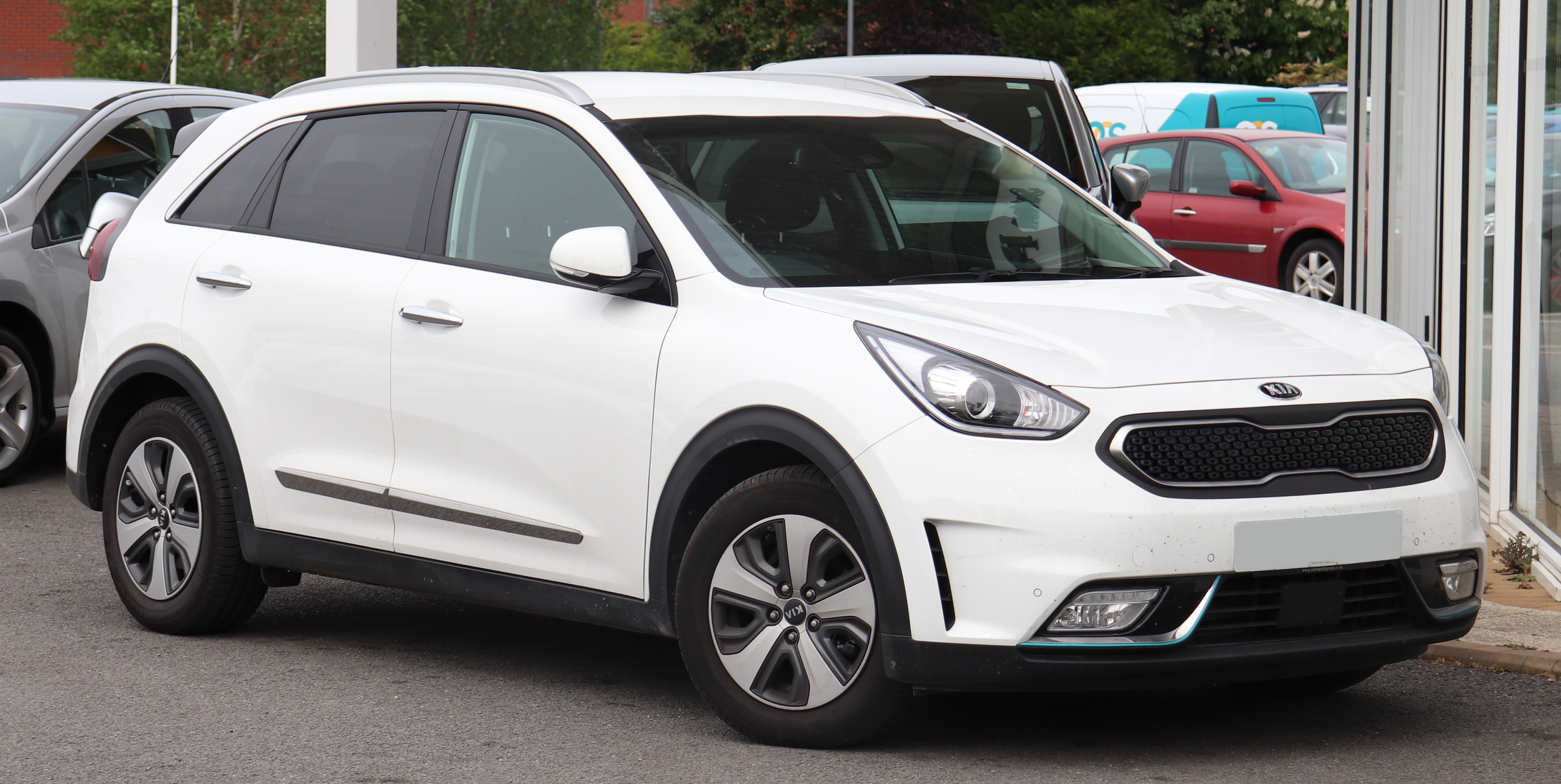
2018 Niro PHEV (pre-facelift)

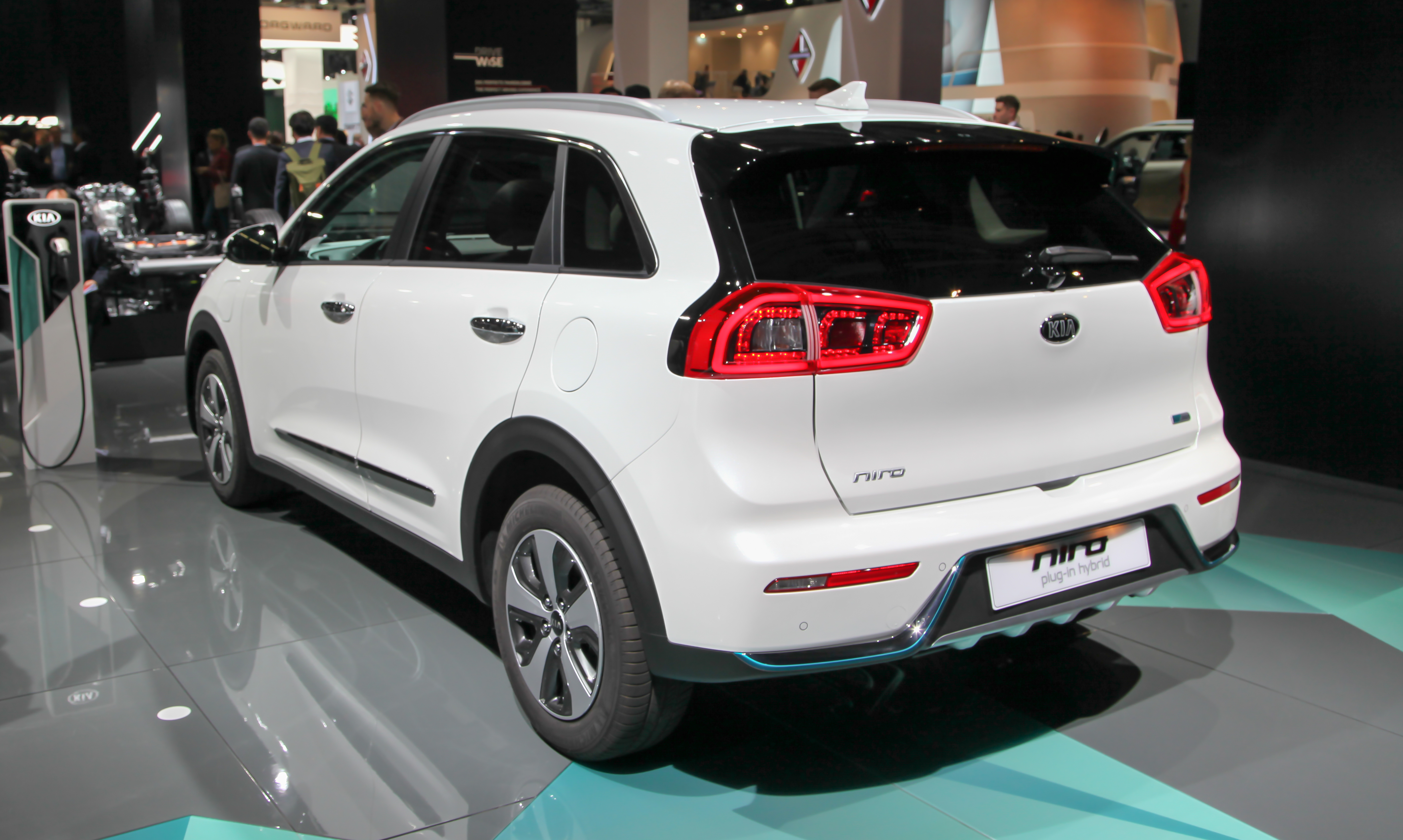
2018 Niro PHEV (pre-facelift)

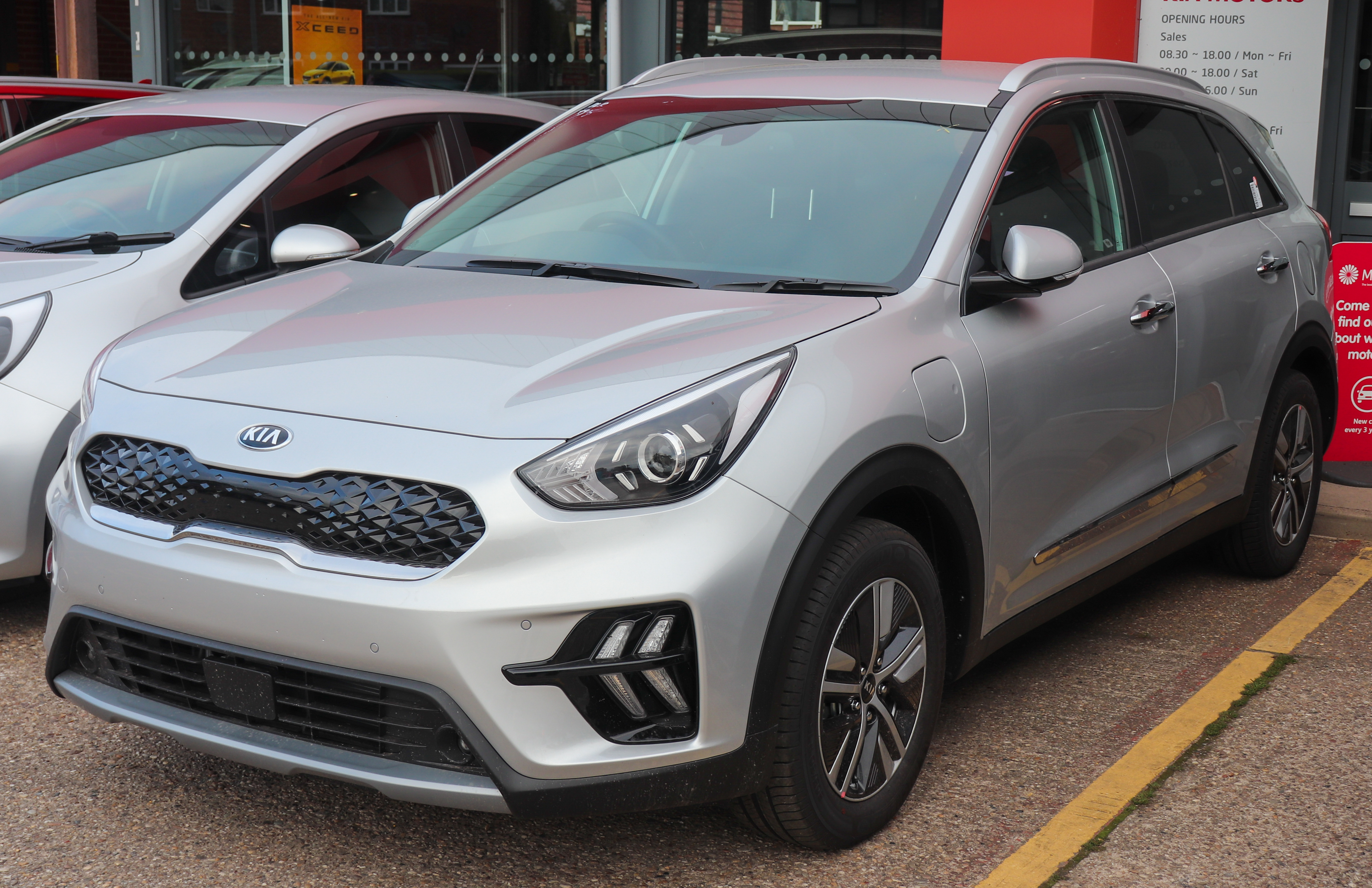
2019 Niro PHEV (facelift)

=== Gasoline engine ===
Both the hybrid and the plug-in hybrid versions of the Niro feature a gasoline engine.

Gasoline/hybrid engine
Engine name	Trim	Displacement (bore x stroke)	Power@rpm, torque@rpm	Compression ratio (:1)
Kappa II GDi HEV	FE, LX, EX, Touring	1,579 cc (96.4 cu in) (72 mm × 97 mm (2.8 in × 3.8 in))	78 kW (104 hp)@5700, 148 N⋅m (109 lb⋅ft)@4000	13:1
Kappa II GDi HEV	FE, LX, EX, Touring	Electric motor	32 kW (43 hp)@1850–2500, 169 N⋅m (125 lb⋅ft)@ 0–1800	na
Kappa II GDi HEV	FE, LX, EX, Touring	Combined	104 kW (139 hp)@5700, 264 N⋅m (195 lb⋅ft)@4000	13:1

=== Niro EV/e-Niro ===
A battery electric version of the Niro was launched in 2018 at the International Electric Vehicle Expo in Korea, named Niro EV in Asia and North America and e-Niro in Europe.

It shares powertrain and battery configuration with the Hyundai Kona Electric. Niro EV is available in two battery versions: 39.2 kWh and 64 kWh. The batteries are liquid-cooled lithium ion polymer. Batteries are manufactured/supplied by SK Innovation, which is different from the Kona Electric, which uses batteries from LG Chem.

The 39.2 kWh version is propelled by a 100 kW (134 hp) permanent-magnet electric motor with 395 Nm (291 lb-ft) of torque and can travel up to 288 km (179 mi) on one charge, according to WLTP, while the 64 kWh version offers 455 km (283 mi) of WLTP range and has a more powerful 150 kW (201 hp) motor producing the same amount of torque. Both cars are front-wheel drive. In the US, the Niro EV has an official EPA range of 239 mi (385 km) on a full charge.

Both versions have a CCS charge port which enables DC rapid charging at up to 77 kW. The onboard charger power is 7.2 kW or optionally 11 kW.

On 3 May 2022, pre-orders of the Niro EV began in South Korea. The Niro EV is equipped with a 64.8 kWh high-voltage battery, smart regenerative braking system 2.0, a heat pump, and a battery heating system. And it can run 463 km (WLTP combined) on a single charge. Also, the battery conditioning function is applied to automatically adjust the battery temperature according to the external environment.

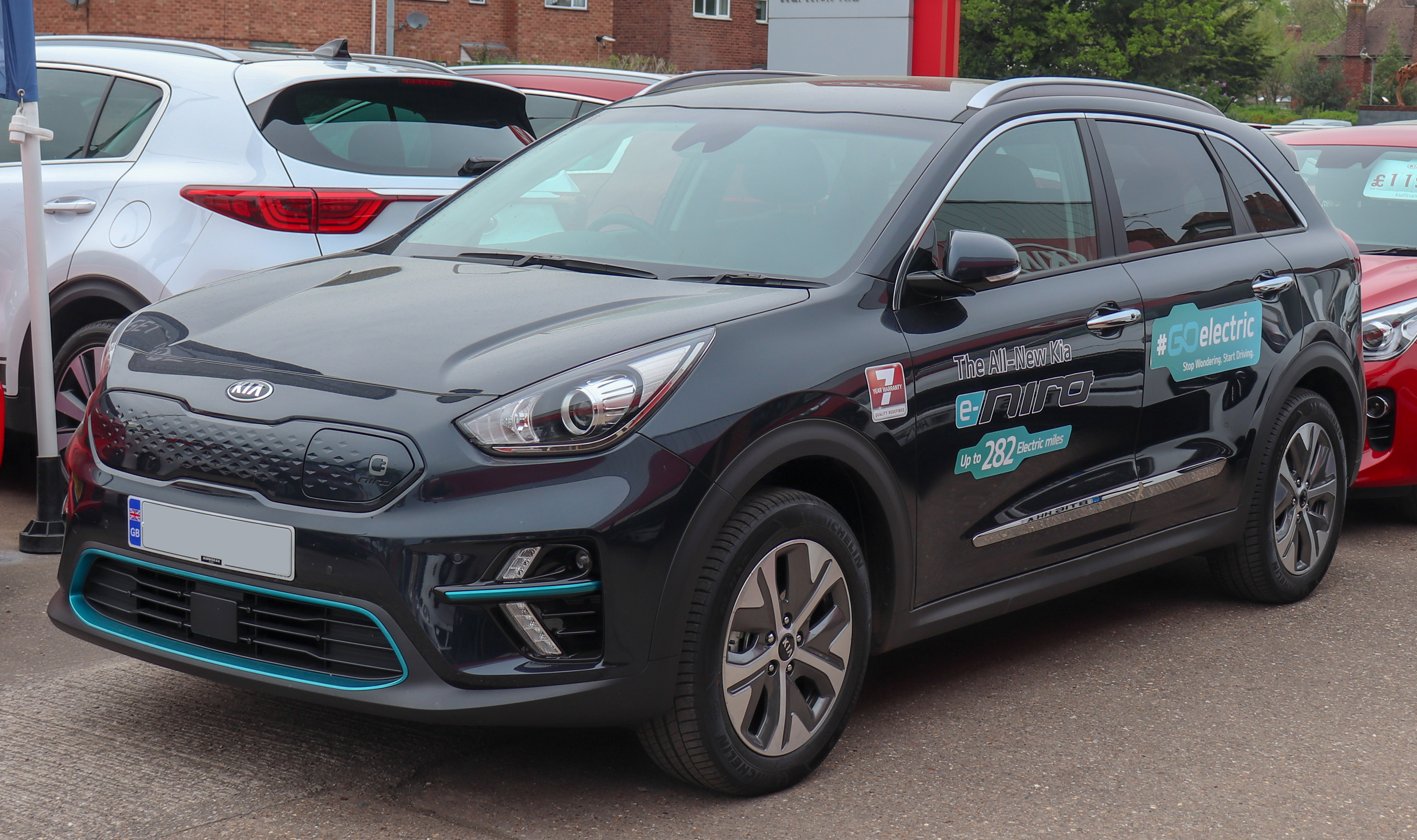
2019 e-Niro

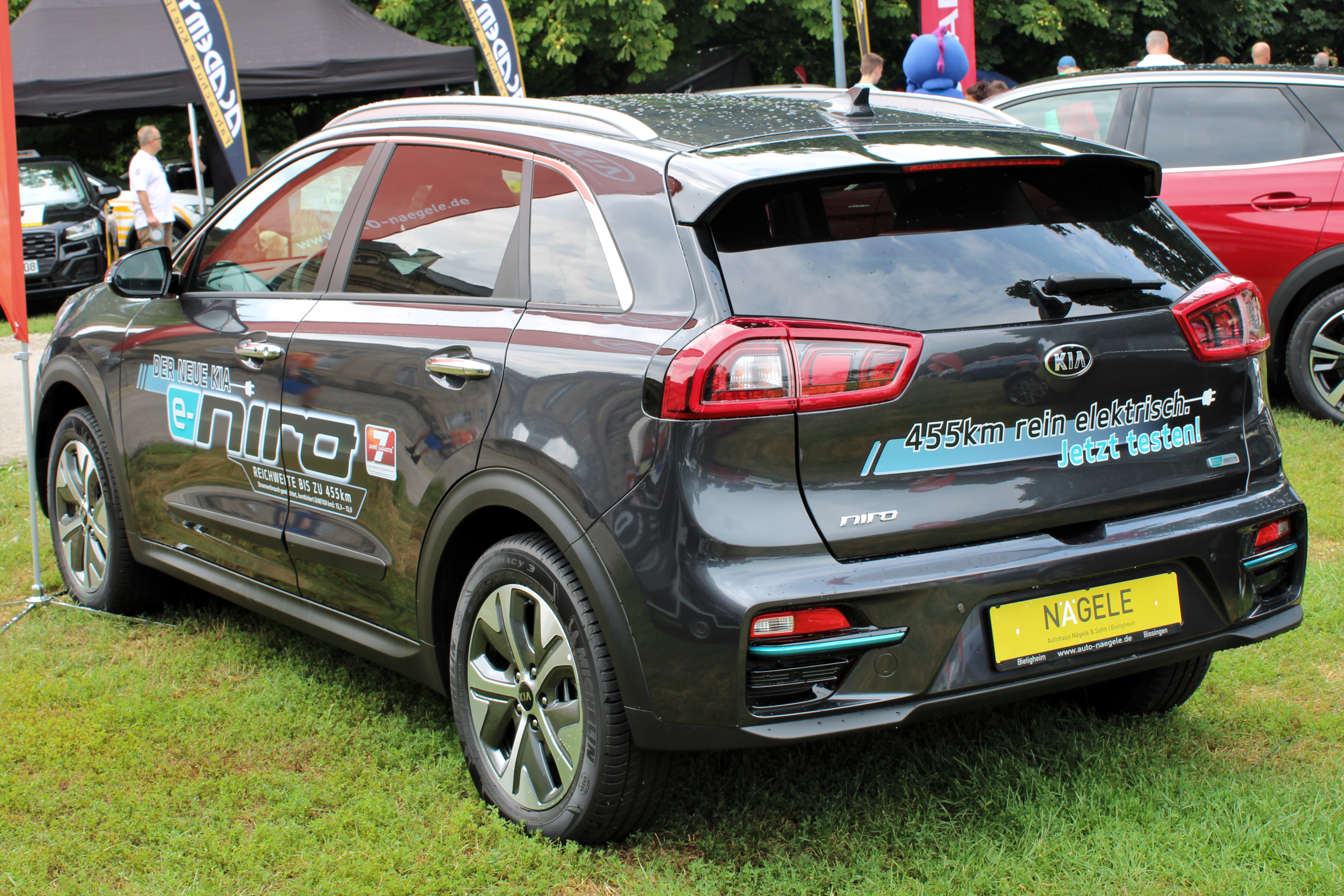
2018 e-Niro

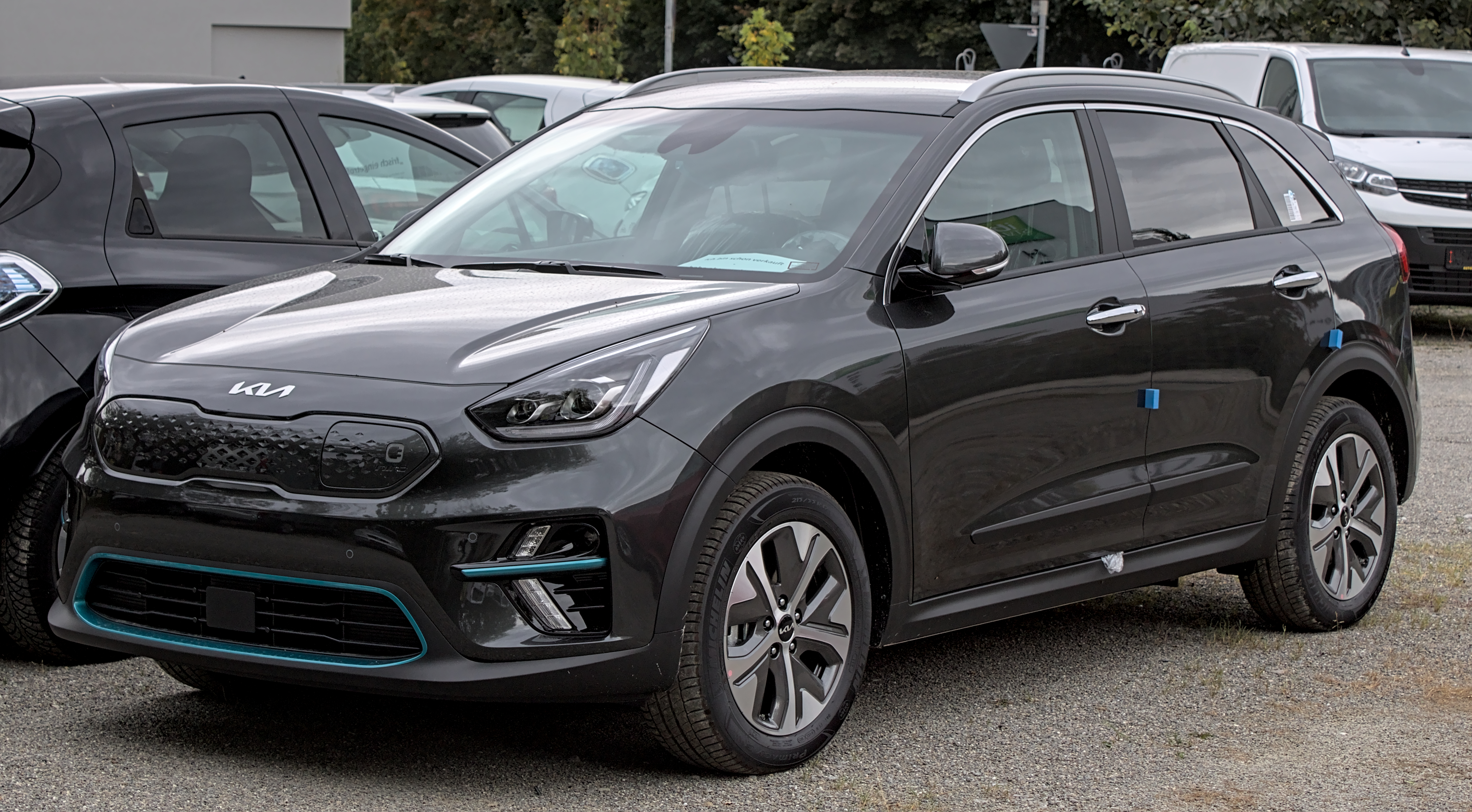
2021 e-Niro

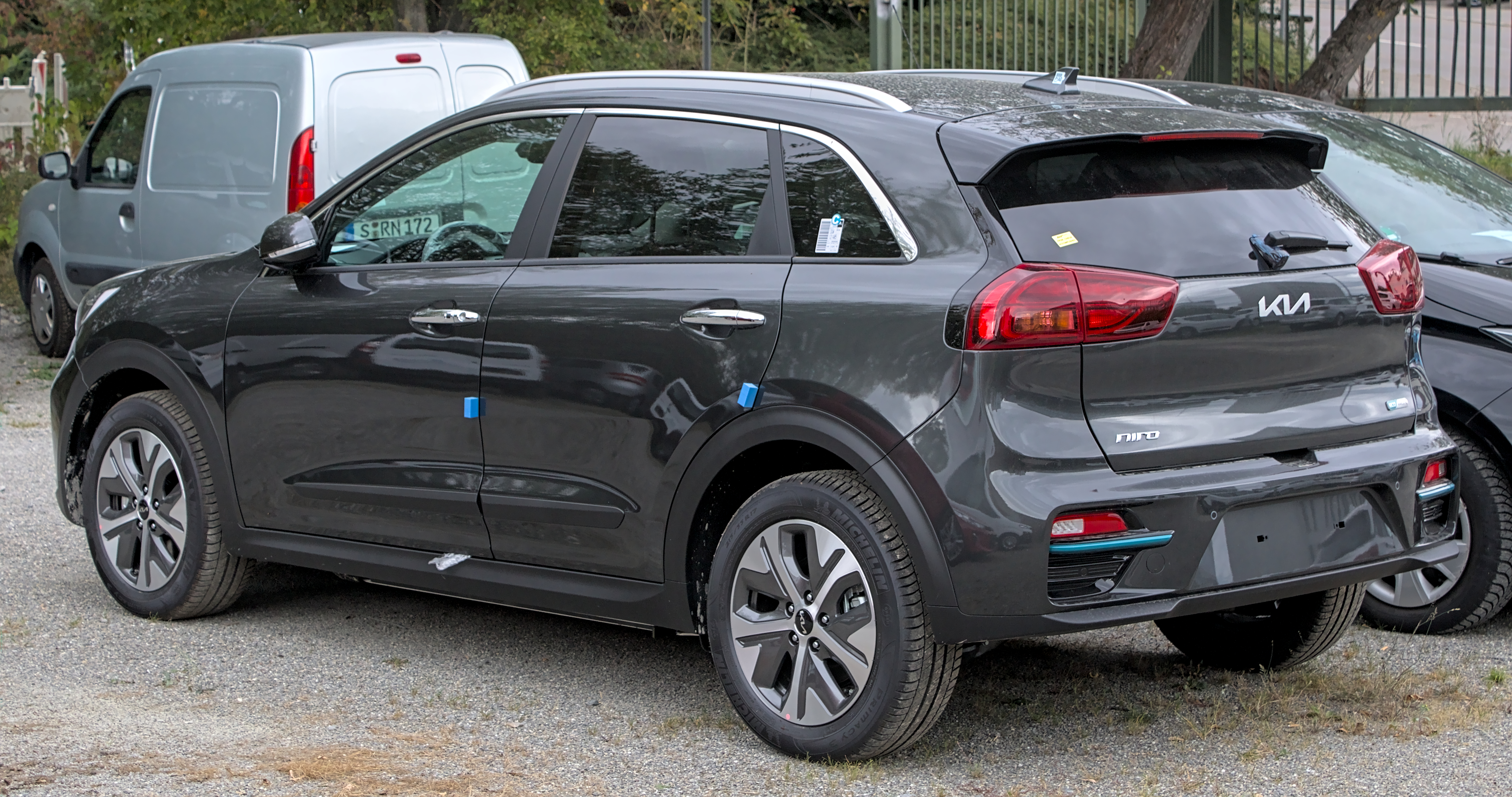
2021 e-Niro

=== Niro Plus ===
Kia introduced the Kia Niro Plus in 3 May 2022. Released in South Korea from the second half of 2022, the Niro Plus is a new variant of the Niro that maximises the onboard space by increasing the height of the vehicle by 80 mm, and by using thinner seats. The total length also increases by 10 mm. The second-row legroom was expanded by 28 mm by adjusting the position of the second-row seat. In addition, the taxi model was applied by additionally applying the power seat and reclining function of the driver seat and lowering the height of the driver seat headrest by 43 mm. An integrated All-in-One Display for taxi model includes navigation, app taximeter, digital tachograph and voice recognition. All-in-one display is applied with AI assistant technology associated with navigation system, informing remaining battery amount at destination or suggesting route via charging station when remaining battery amount is insufficient. Unlike the second-generation Niro, the Niro Plus is assembled by Donghee in Seosan, South Chungcheong Province which also makes the Morning, Ray and the Stonic.

Two variants are offered: the Niro Plus Taxi (specifically intended for cab drivers and only available in BEV) and Kia Niro Plus (offered to all types of customers and available in HEV, PHEV and BEV), while the latter will be exported overseas.

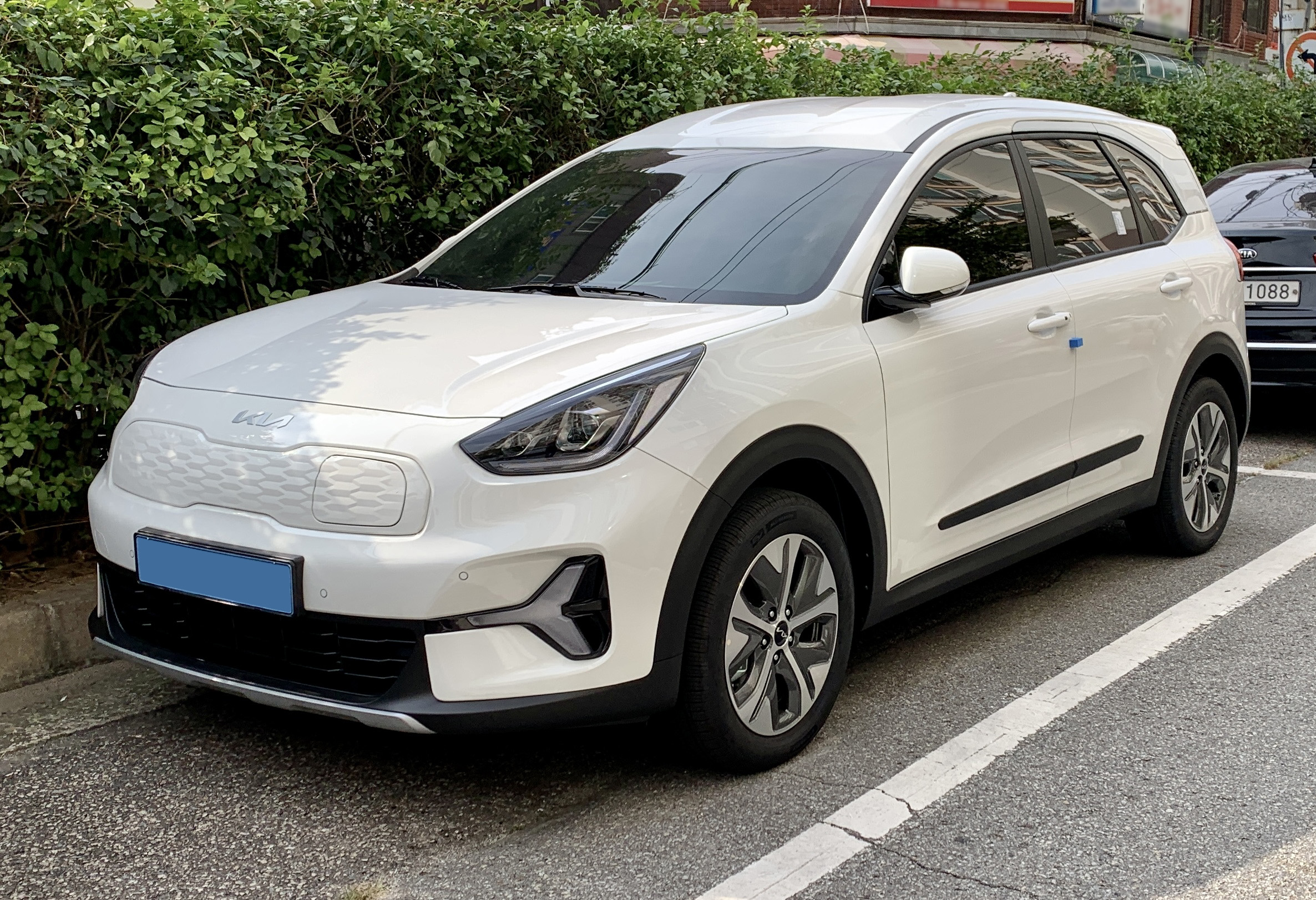
Kia Niro Plus

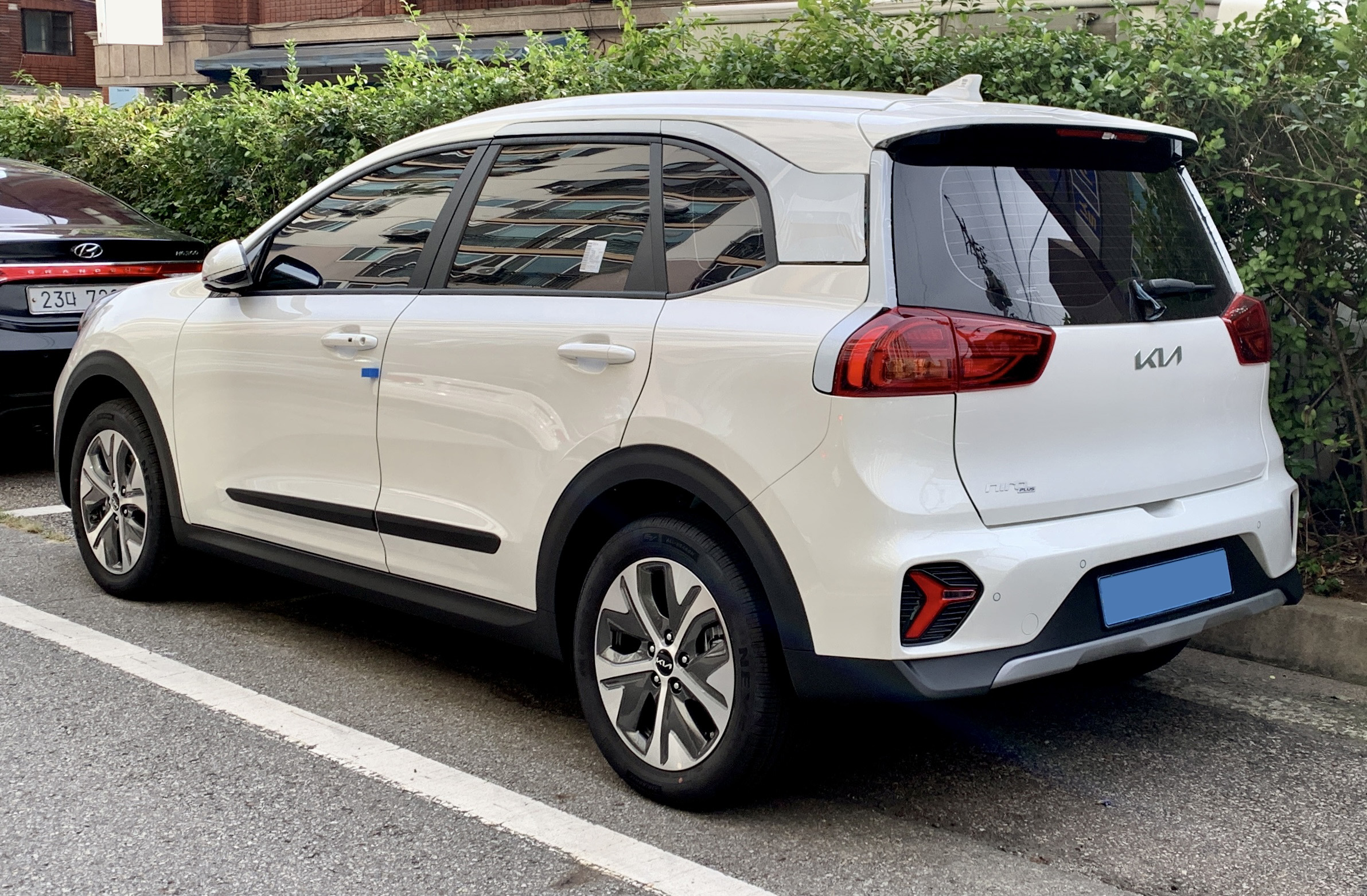
Rear view

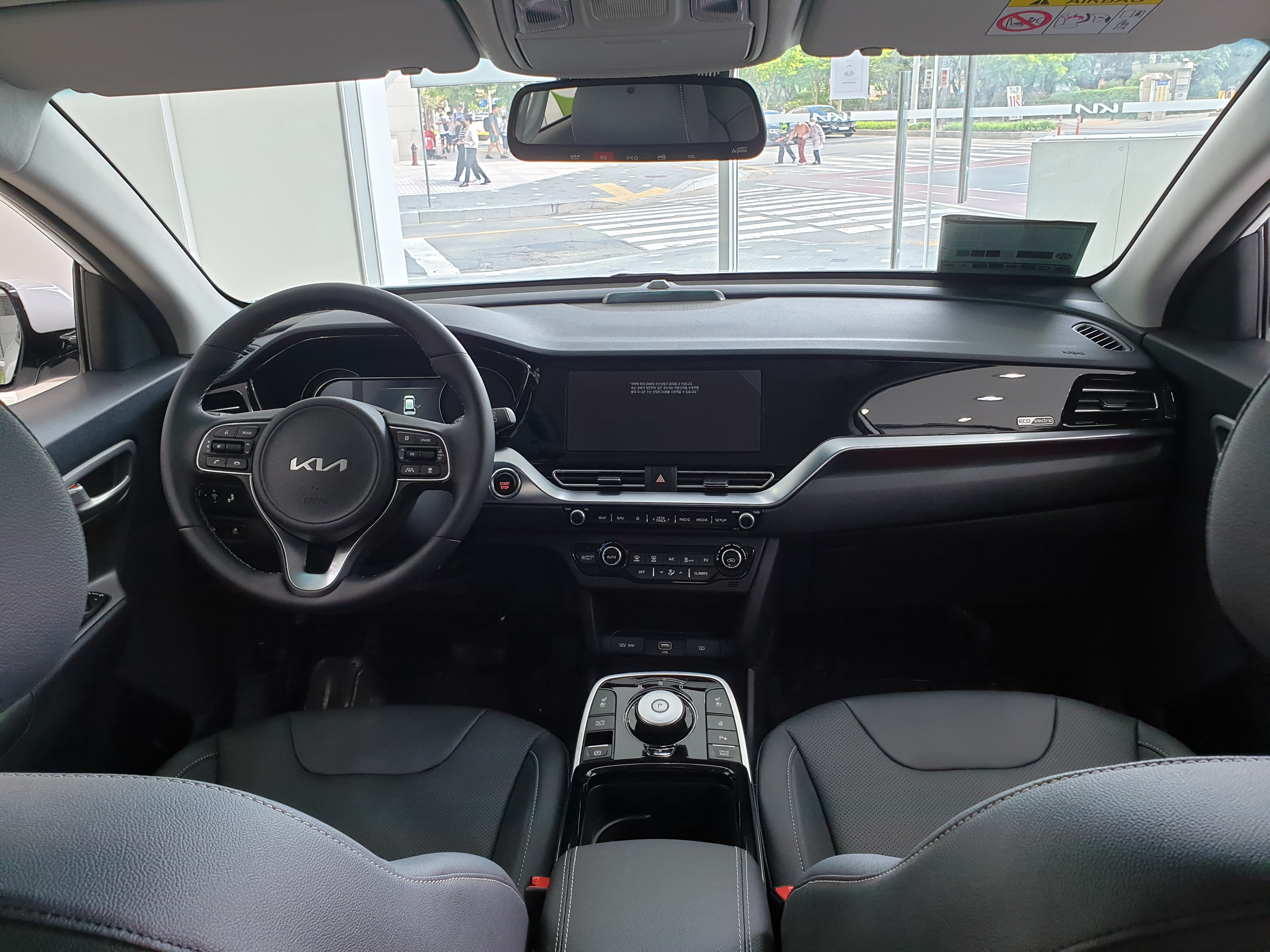
Interior

=== Safety ===
Euro NCAP

Euro NCAP test results for a LHD variant on a registration from 2016:

Test	Score	Points
Overall:	4/5 stars	
Adult occupant:	83%	31.8
Child occupant:	80%	39.6
Pedestrian:	57%	24.3
Safety assist:	59%	7.1

ANCAP test results* Kia Niro 1.6 litre hybrid & PHEV variants, including Niro Plus (2016, aligned with Euro NCAP)
Test	Points	%
Overall:	5 /5 stars	
Adult occupant:	34.8	91%
Child occupant:	39.6	80%
Pedestrian:	29.6	70%
Safety assist:	9.7	77%

=== 2016 Guinness World Record ===
In December 2016, the Niro officially received a Guinness World Records title for the lowest fuel consumption by a hybrid vehicle, as it travelled from Los Angeles to New York City with a fuel consumption record of 76.6 mpg_{‑US} (3.1 L/100 km). This record had last been held by the Kia Optima Hybrid in 2011, with a fuel consumption average of 64.55 mpg_{‑US} (3.6 L/100 km).

== Second generation (SG2; 2021) ==
Second generation
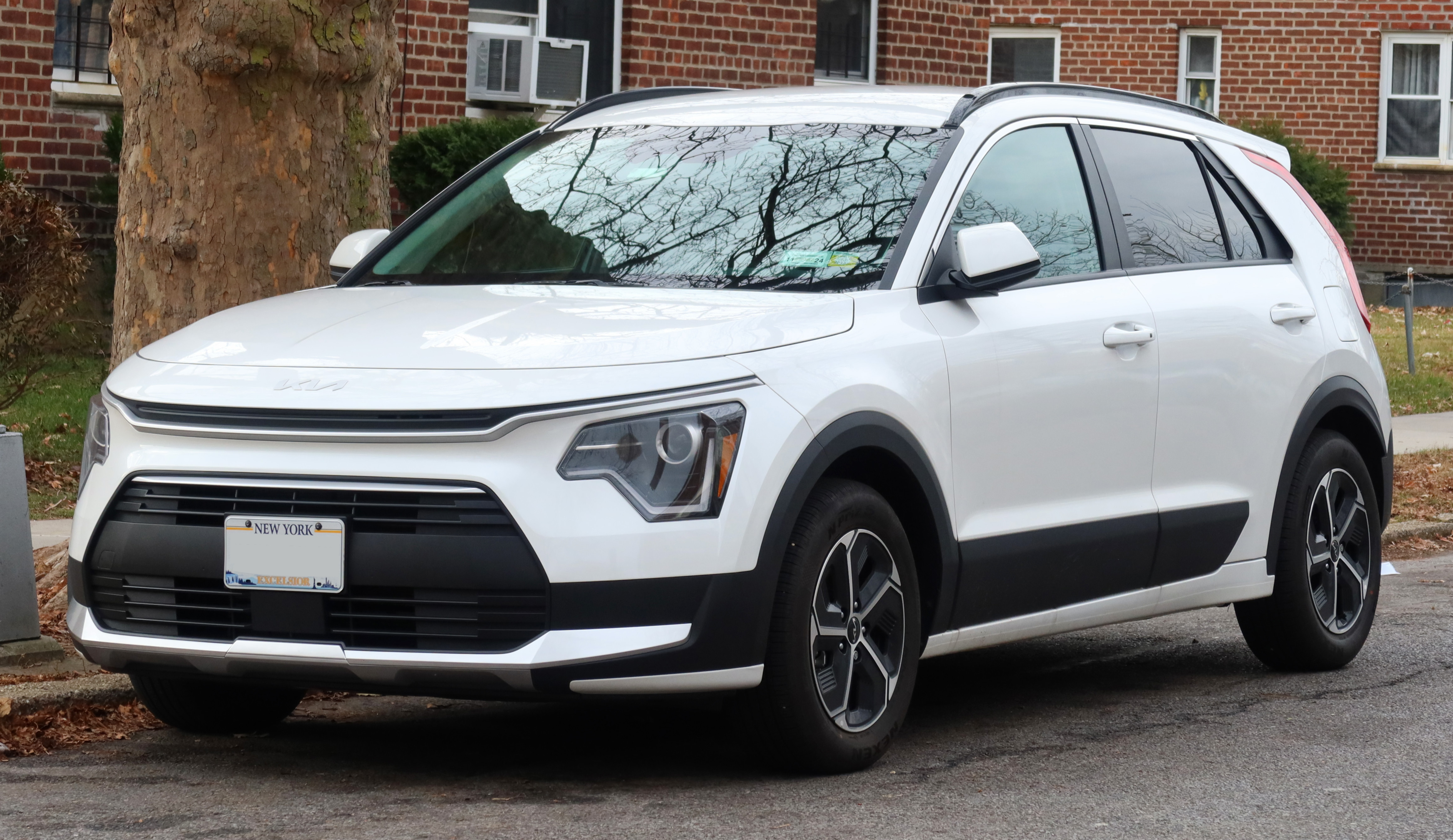
- 2023 Kia Niro EX (SG2, US)

Overview
- Model code: SG2
- Production: 2021–present
- Model years: 2023–present
- Assembly: South Korea: Hwaseong (Autoland Hwasung)

Body and chassis
- Platform: Hyundai-Kia K3
- Related: Hyundai Kona (SX2)

Powertrain
- Engine: Petrol hybrid: 1.6 L Smartstream G1.6 GDi HEV/PHEV I4
- Electric motor: Permanent Magnet Synchronous Motor: 42 kW (56 hp) (HEV); 83 kW (111 hp) (PHEV); 150 kW (201 hp) (EV)
- Transmission: 6-speed D6KF1 dual-clutch (HEV & PHEV); 1-speed reduction gear (EV)
- Hybrid drivetrain: Parallel hybrid; Plug-in hybrid
- Battery: 1.32 kWh Lithium polymer battery (HEV); 11.1 kWh Lithium polymer battery (PHEV); 64.8 kWh Lithium polymer battery (EV)
- Plug-in charging: 94 kW DC (EV); 11.5 kW AC (EV); V2L: 1.8 kW (EV)

Dimensions
- Wheelbase: 2,720 mm (107.1 in)
- Length: 4,420 mm (174.0 in)
- Width: 1,825 mm (71.9 in)
- Height: 1,545–1,585 mm (60.8–62.4 in)
- Curb weight: 1,405–1,490 kg (3,097–3,285 lb) (Hybrid); 1,610 kg (3,549 lb) (Plug-in Hybrid); 1,739 kg (3,834 lb) (Electric)

The second-generation Niro was released at the 2021 Seoul Mobility Show on 25 November. The front part extended the Tiger Face design from the hood to the fender. A C-pillar integrated with a boomerang-shaped LED rear combination lamp was applied to the side, and a vertical LED rear combination lamp was applied to the rear.

In the interior, recycled fibres were used on the ceiling of the vehicle and water-friendly paint without benzene, toluene, and xylene was added to the door panel. The bio-artificial leather sheet used fibres made from raw materials extracted from eucalyptus leaves. It is also equipped with driver assistance systems and infotainment such as head-up displays, remote smart parking assistance, rear passenger notification, and smart power tailgate.

The model was officially launched on 25 January 2022, while the second-generation Niro EV debuted in April 2022.

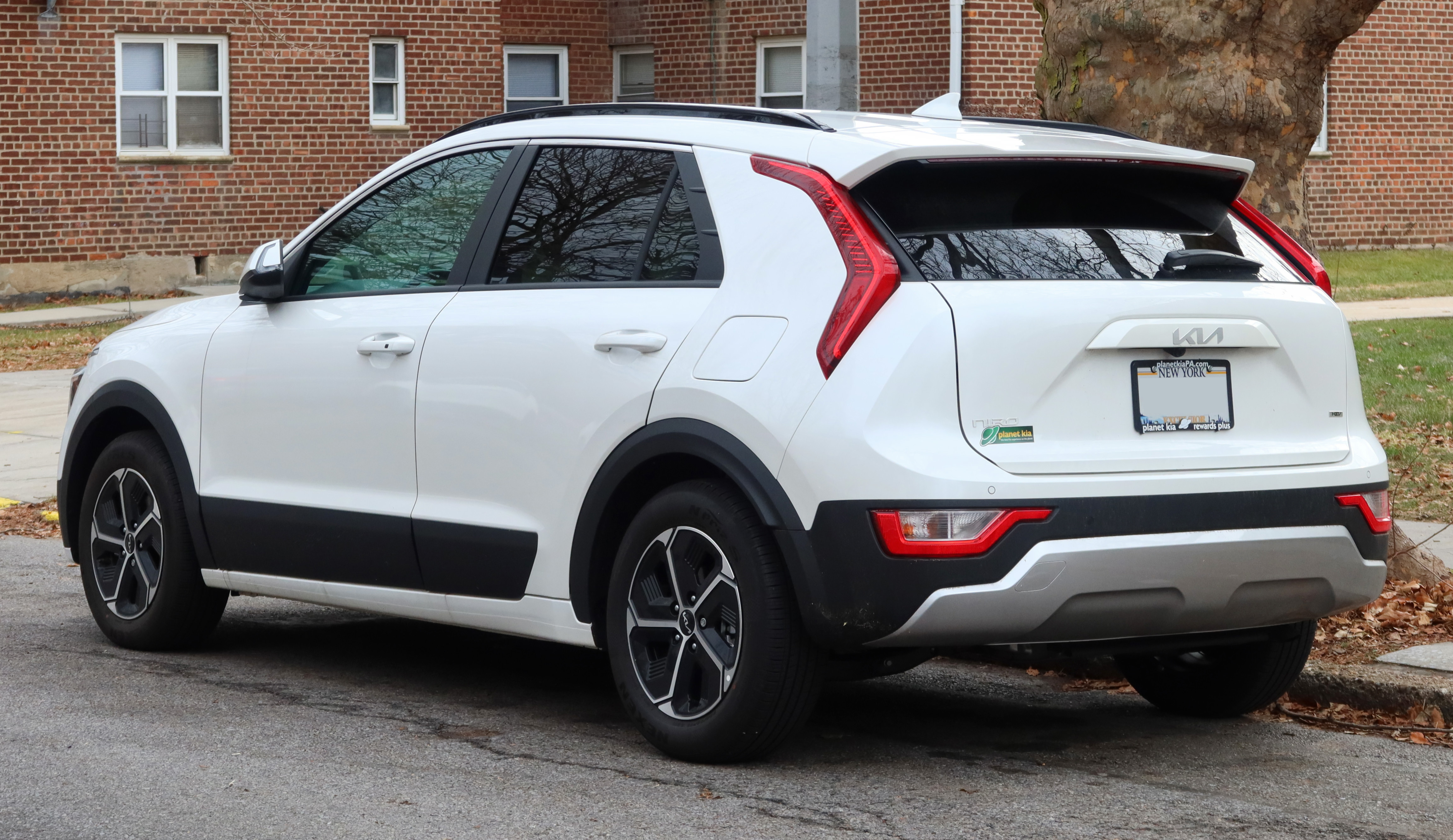
2023 Niro EX (Rear view)

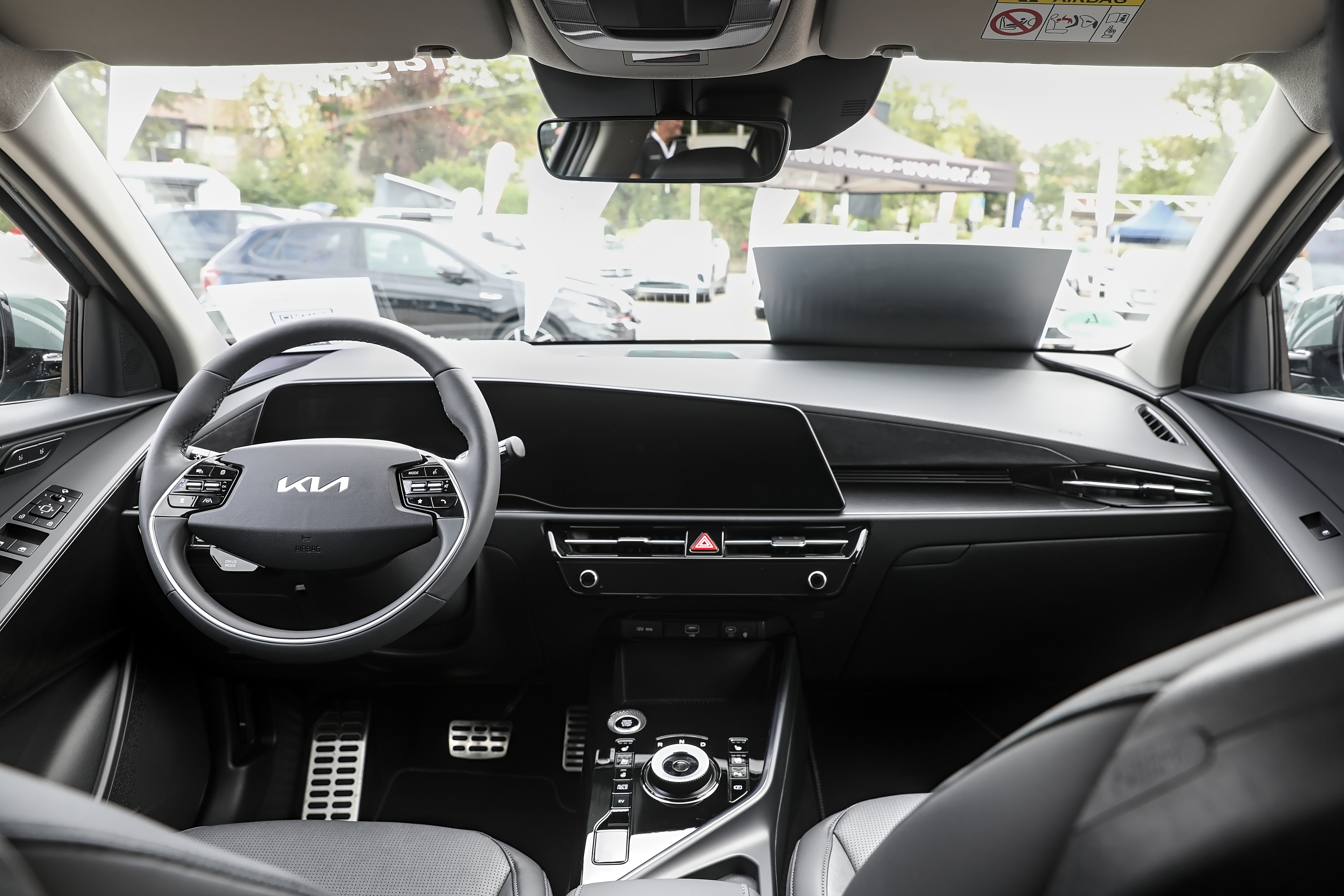
Interior

=== Facelift (2026) ===
The Niro facelift, unveiled in South Korea on 20 January 2026, introduced a revised front and rear design with Kia's "Star Map" lighting signature, new 18-inch wheels, and an updated cabin featuring a horizontal dashboard, two-spoke steering wheel, and dual 12.3-inch displays. Following the update, Kia discontinued both the Niro plug-in hybrid (PHEV) and Niro EV, leaving the facelifted model available exclusively as a conventional hybrid (HEV).

2026 facelift Niro (front)

2026 facelift Niro (rear)

=== Powertrain ===
Hybrid engine
Model	Engine	Transmissions	Power	Torque	0–100 km/h (0–62 mph) (Official)	Top speed
Smartstream G1.6 Hybrid	1,580 cc (96 cu in)	6-speed DCT	104 kW (139 hp) at 5,700 rpm	265 N⋅m (195 lbf⋅ft) at 4,400 rpm	10.4s 10.8s	164 km/h (102 mph)
Plug-in hybrid engine
Smartstream G1.6 Plug-in Hybrid	1,580 cc (96 cu in)	6-speed DCT	134 kW (180 hp) at 5,700 rpm	265 N⋅m (195 lbf⋅ft) at 4,400 rpm	9.6s 9.8s	167 km/h (104 mph); 161 km/h (100 mph)
Electric
Electric	PMS Motor	1-speed	150 kW (201 hp) at 6,000–9,000 rpm	255 N⋅m (188 lbf⋅ft) at 0–5,600 rpm	7.8s	167 km/h (104 mph)

=== Safety ===
Euro NCAP test results Kia Niro (2022)
Test	Points	%
Overall:	4 /5 stars	
Adult occupant:	34.7	91%
Child occupant:	41.2	84%
Pedestrian:	40.6	75%
Safety assist:	9.7	60%

ANCAP test results Kia Niro all variants (2022, aligned with Euro NCAP)
Test	Points	%
Overall:	5 /5 stars	
Adult occupant:	33.71	88%
Child occupant:	41.62	84%
Pedestrian:	41.44	76%
Safety assist:	13.98	87%

== Reception ==
Popular Mechanics named the 2019 Kia Niro EV as its 2019 Car of the Year, praising it for its normal looks, 239-mile range, and that it can use Volkswagen Group of America's Electrify America chargers to allow the car to be used on long car trips.

The UK's What Car? magazine named the Kia e-Niro its 2019 Car of the Year – the first time the prize had been awarded to an electric vehicle.

The car was chosen as one of the Top 10 Tech Cars by the IEEE in 2018.

The Kia Niro was selected as the 'Best Urban Car' at the 2023 Women’s Car of the Year.

== Concept models ==
=== Concept (2013) ===
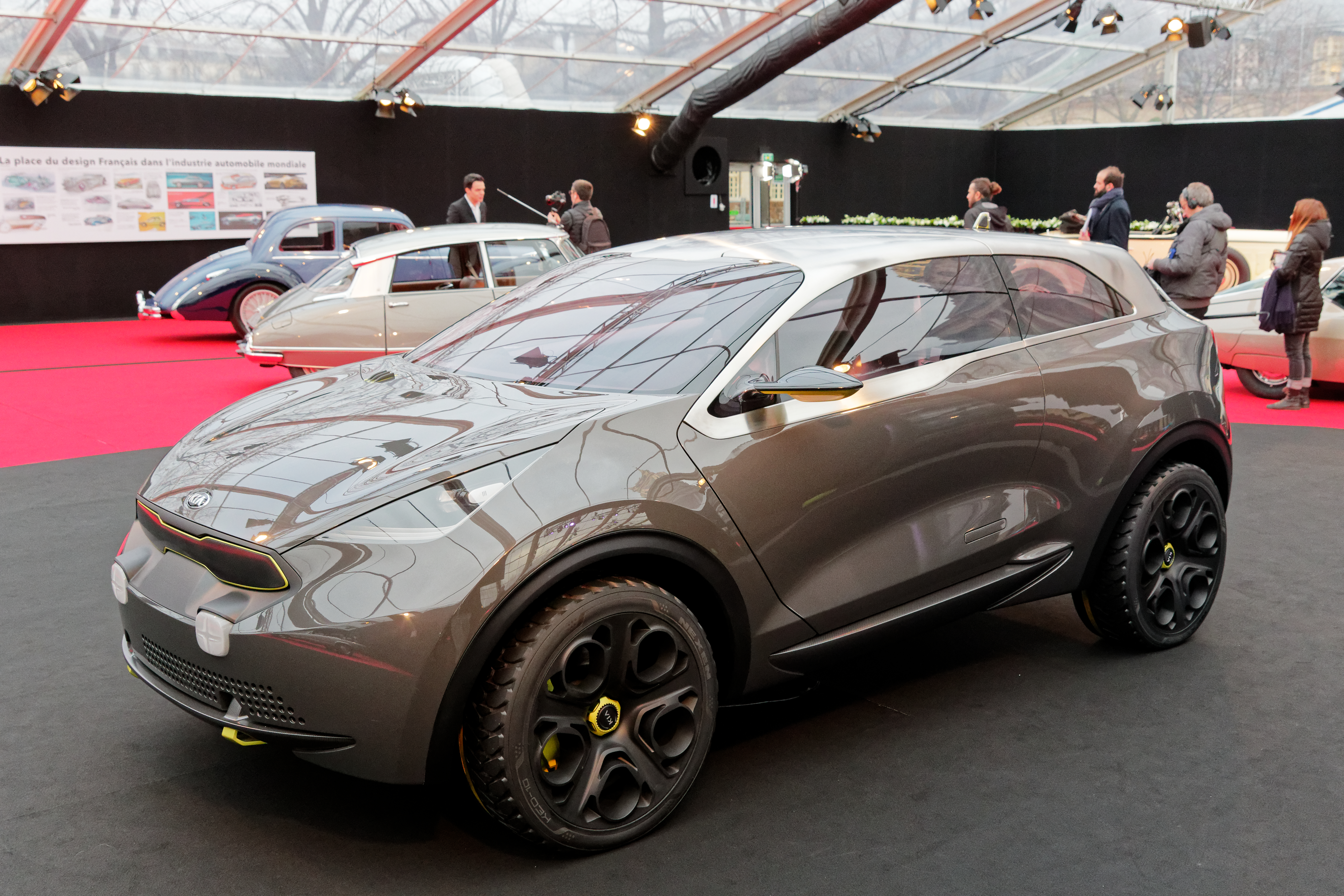
Kia Niro Concept

The Kia Niro concept debuted at the 2013 Frankfurt Auto Show. The car, designed almost entirely by Peter Schreyer at Kia's Frankfurt studio, is a sporty three door subcompact crossover, with butterfly doors that open into the roof panel.

The front wheels are powered by the 1.6-litre Gamma inline-4 producing 160 hp (119 kW) mated with a seven speed rotary-shifted dual-clutch transmission, while a 45 hp electric hybrid system powers the rear wheels when driving in rougher road conditions.

=== KX–3 concept ===
The Kia KX–3 concept followed at the November 2014 Guangzhou Auto Show. Inspired by the earlier Niro concept, it has grown larger in size into a compact SUV, measuring 167.71 inches (4,260 mm) long and 69.48 inches (1,765 mm) wide. A turbocharged 1.6-litre engine delivers power to all four wheels via a seven speed dual clutch transmission.

=== HabaNiro Concept ===
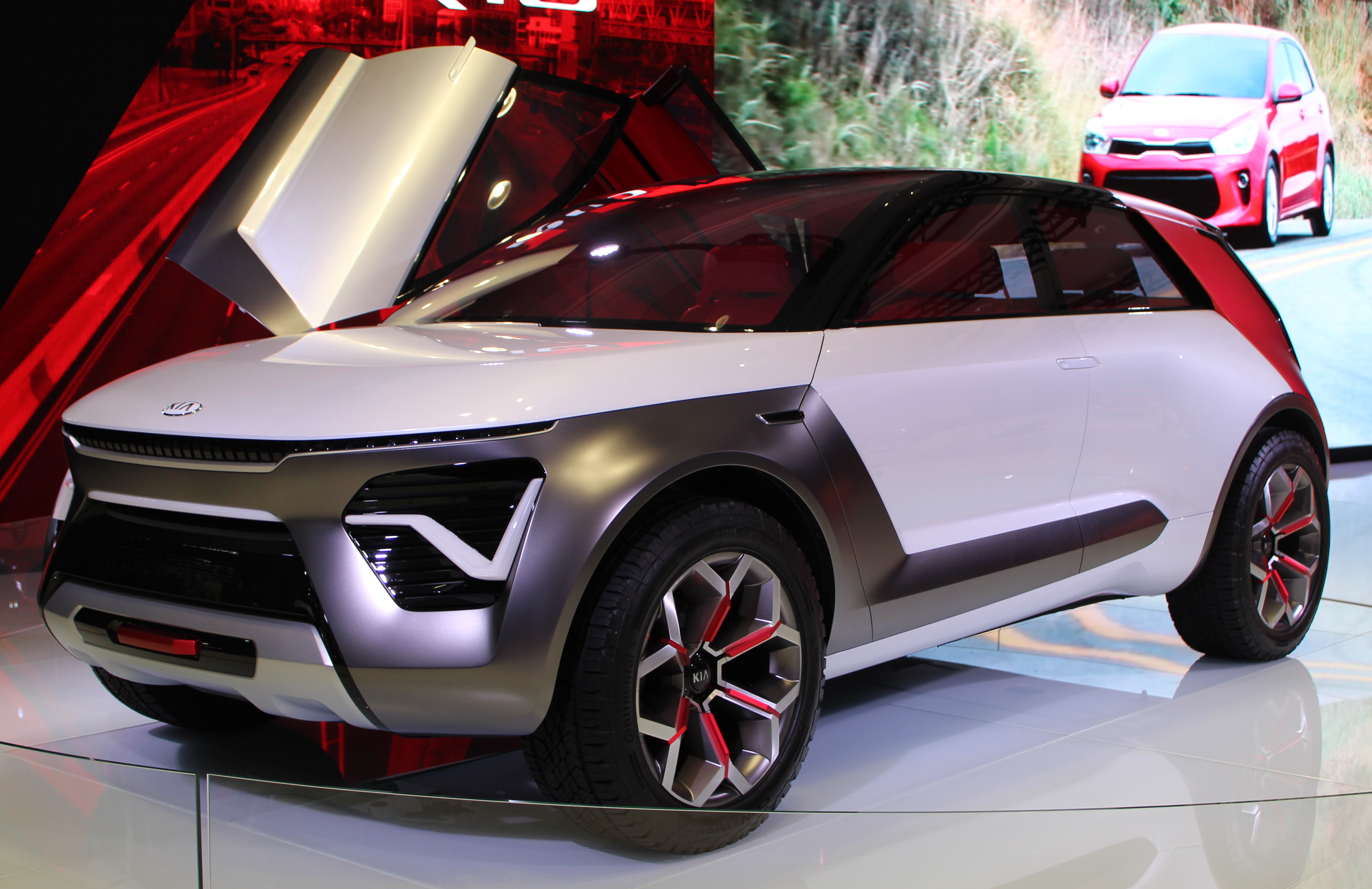
Kia HabaNiro

The Kia HabaNiro Concept was unveiled at the 2019 New York Auto Show. The model featured butterfly doors and also previewed some design elements of the second generation Niro.

== Sales ==
Calendar Year	South Korea		Europe	U.S.	Mexico
Calendar Year	Niro	Niro Plus	Europe	U.S.	Mexico
2016			8,562		
2017	23,647		33,972	27,237	788
2018	22,811		44,225	28,232	1,084
2019	26,246		57,337	24,467	1,334
2020	21,239		77,830	17,434	887
2021	18,504		88,843	26,192	1,010
2022	24,778	4,713	80,320	28,744	1,345
2023	20,559	2,916	72,866	36,300	223
2024	14,570	408	69,214	30,094	
2025				31,182	
