= List of Kia vehicles =

The South Korean automobile manufacturer Kia has produced various cars, SUVs, and buses.

== Passenger vehicles ==
=== Current models ===
| Model | | | Current generation | | | Vehicle description | Global sales (2022, by units) |
| Image | Name(s) | Introduction (cal. year) | Model code | Introduction | Main markets | Vehicle description | Global sales (2022, by units) |
|---|---|---|---|---|---|---|---|
Hatchback
| | Picanto/ Morning | 2004 | JA | 2017 | Global (except North America and China) | City car (A-segment). | 148,197 |
| | Ray | 2011 | TAM | 2011 | South Korea | City car with single rear sliding door based on the Picanto for the South Korean market. Battery electric version is available. | 44,566 |
| | EV2 | 2026 | QV1 | 2026 | Europe and a handful of other regions | Battery electric subcompact hatchback based on the Hyundai E-GMP platform. | - |
| | K3 | 2023 | BL7 | 2023 | Latin America and Middle East | Subcompact (B-segment) hatchback, successor of the Rio hatchback. | - |
| | K4 | 2025 | CL4 | 2025 | Americas, Europe, Australia etc. | Compact (C-segment) hatchback, successor to the Forte/Cerato hatchback and Ceed hatchback. | - |
| | EV4 | 2025 | CT | 2025 | Europe, etc. | Battery electric compact (C-segment) hatchback based on the Hyundai E-GMP platform. | - |
Sedan/liftback
| | Pegas/ Soluto | 2017 | AB | 2017 | Emerging markets | Entry-level subcompact (B-segment) sedan. | 36,755 |
| | K3 | 2023 | BL7 | 2023 | Latin America and Middle East | Subcompact (B-segment) sedan, successor of the Rio sedan. | - |
| | K4 | 2024 | CL4 | 2024 | Americas, Middle East, Australia, etc. | Compact (C-segment) sedan, successor of the Forte/K3/Cerato sedan. | - |
| | EV4 | 2025 | CT | 2025 | Global | Battery electric compact sedan based on the Hyundai E-GMP platform. | - |
| | K5 | 2000 (as Optima) | DL3 | 2019 | North America, South Korea, Middle East, etc. | Mid-size (D-segment) sedan, successor of the Optima. | 121,538 |
| | K8 | 2021 | GL3 | 2021 | South Korea, Eurasia and the Middle East | Full-size sedan (E-segment) oriented for the domestic South Korean market, successor of the K7. | 47,279 |
Station wagon
| | K4 SW | 2026 | CL4 | 2026 | Europe | Station wagon version of the K4, successor to the Ceed SW. | - |
SUV/crossover
| | Sonet | 2020 | QY | 2020 | Global emerging markets | Entry-level subcompact crossover SUV (B-segment) smaller than Stonic. | 112,357 |
| | Syros | 2025 | AY | 2025 | India | Crossover city car (A-segment) developed produced in India. | - |
| | Stonic | 2017 | YB CUV | 2025 | Europe, Australasia and select other regions | Subcompact crossover hatchback (B-segment) based on the Rio. | 104,142 |
| | EV3 | 2024 | SV | 2024 | Majority of regions worldwide | Battery electric compact crossover SUV based on the Hyundai E-GMP platform. | - |
| | Seltos | 2019 | SP3 | 2026 | Global | Subcompact crossover SUV (B-segment). | 299,433 |
| | XCeed | 2018 | CD CUV | 2026 | Europe and select other regions | Two-row compact crossover SUV (C-segment) based on the Ceed. | 53,951 |
| | Sportage | 1993 | NQ5 | 2021 | Global (except India) | Two-row compact crossover SUV (C-segment). Best selling Kia model globally. Sold in China as the Sportage L. | 415,863 |
| | Sportage Ace | 2005 | NP | 2017 | China | Two-row compact crossover SUV for the Chinese market. | 17,582 |
| | Niro | 2016 | SG2 | 2022 | Global (except in select regions) | Alternative fuel vehicle compact crossover SUV. Available as a hybrid. | 141,427 |
| | EV5 | 2023 | OV | 2023 | Global (except the United States and Mexico) | Battery electric mid-size SUV (D-segment) based on the Hyundai-Kia N3 eK platform. | - |
| | EV6 | 2021 | CV | 2021 | Global | Battery electric compact crossover SUV based on the Hyundai E-GMP platform. | 83,411 |
| | Sorento | 2002 | MQ4 | 2020 | Global | Two or three-row mid-size crossover SUV. | 214,476 |
| | Telluride | 2018 | LQ2 | 2026 | North America and Middle East | Larger three-row mid-size crossover SUV. | 106,860 |
| | EV9 | 2023 | MV | 2023 | Global | Battery electric mid-size SUV with three-row seating based on the Hyundai E-GMP platform. | - |
Pickup truck/Ute
| | Tasman | 2025 | TK | 2025 | Australia, New Zealand, South Korea and emerging markets | Mid-size pickup truck. | - |
Minivan/MPV / Van
| | Carens/Carens Clavis | 1999 | KY | 2021 | Asia-Pacific emerging markets | Crossover-styled three-row compact MPV. Battery electric version is available. | 68,874 |
| | Carnival | 1998 | KA4 | 2020 | Global (except Europe) | Three-row or four-row (depending on the market) minivan with sliding doors. | 111,777 |
| | PV5 | 2025 | SW1 | 2025 | Global (except the United States and India) | Battery electric van and minivan based on the E-GMP.S platform. | - |
| | PV7 | 2026 | LW1 | 2026 | Global (except the United States and India) | Battery electric full-size van based on the E-GMP.S platform. | - |

=== Former models ===
| Model | Timeline | | Successor |
| Model | Introduced | Discontinued | Successor |
|---|---|---|---|
| Avella | 1994 | 1999 | Rio/Pride |
| Brisa | 1974 | 1981 | Pride |
| Concord/Capital | 1987 | 1996 | Credos |
| Ceed hatchback | 2006 | 2025 | K4 hatchback |
| Ceed Sportswagon | 2006 | 2026 | K4 estate |
| Credos | 1996 | 2000 | Optima |
| Enterprise | 1998 | 2002 | Opirus/Amanti |
| Elan/Vigato | 1996 | 1999 | |
| Forte/K3/Cerato | 2008 | 2024 | K4 (2024) |
| Joice | 1999 | 2003 | Carens |
| K4 (China) | 2014 | 2020 | - |
| K7/Cadenza | 2009 | 2021 | K8 |
| K9 | 2012 | 2026 | - |
| KX3 | 2015 | 2023 | Seltos |
| KX5 | 2015 | 2021 | Sportage |
| KX7 | 2016 | 2021 | - |
| Mentor | 1994 | 2001 | - |
| Mohave | 2009 | 2024 | - |
| Niro Plus | 2021 | 2024 | - |
| Opirus/Amanti | 2002 | 2011 | K7/Cadenza |
| Potentia | 1992 | 2001 | K9 |
| Pregio | 1995 | 2006 | - |
| Pride | 1986 | 2011 | Rio |
| Proceed | 2006 | 2025 | K4 estate |
| Qianlima | 2003 | 2006 | Rio/Pride |
| Retona | 1998 | 2003 | Sportage |
| Rio | 1999 | 2023 | K3 (BL7) |
| Rondo | 2006 | 2022 | Carens |
| Sephia | 1992 | 2003 | Cerato |
| Spectra | 2000 | 2009 | Forte |
| Stinger | 2017 | 2023 | - |
| Soul | 2008 | 2025 | - |
| Soul EV | 2014 | 2024 | EV3 |
| Venga | 2009 | 2017 | - |
| Visto | 2000 | 2004 | Picanto |

== Commercial vehicles ==
| Model | | | Current generation | | Vehicle description |
| Image | Name(s) | Introduction (cal. year) | Introduction | Main markets | Vehicle description |
|---|---|---|---|---|---|
Van
| | PV5 | 2025 | 2025 | Global | Mid-size battery electric van based on the E-GMP.S platform. |
| | PV7 | 2026 | 2026 | Global | Full-size battery electric van based on the E-GMP.S platform. |
Truck
| | Bongo | 1981 | 2004 | South Korea | Light-duty cabover truck. Related to the Hyundai Porter. |
| | PV5 | 2025 | 2025 | Global | Mid-size battery electric chassis cab based on the E-GMP.S platform. |
| | PV7 | 2026 | 2026 | Global | Full-size battery electric chassis cab based on the E-GMP.S platform. |
Bus
| | Granbird | 1994 | 2020 | South Korea | High-decker coach bus. |

=== Former models ===
| Model | Timeline | | Successor |
| Model | Introduced | Discontinued | Successor |
|---|---|---|---|
| Pregio | 1995 | 2006 | - |
| Combi | 2000 | 2002 | - |

== Concept cars ==
- Cub
- Concept PV1
- Concept PV5
- Concept PV7
- EV2 Concept
- EV3 Concept
- EV4 Concept
- EV5 Concept
- EV9 Concept
- GT
- HabaNiro
- Imagine
- KCV III
- KCV-4 Mojave
- KED-10
- Kee
- KND-4
- KND-7
- KV7
- KOUP
- Kue
- Mohave Masterpiece
- Multi S
- Naimo
- Niro
- Pop
- Provo
- Rondo SX
- Rondo Taxi
- Slice
- Sonet
- SP Concept
- SP Signature
- Telluride
- Vision Meta Turismo

== KIA Defense ==
- KLTV (also called K151) similar to the HMMWV
- KM250 (K500 series) variant of the M35 truck
- KM410 variant of the Willys M38A1 MD Jeep
- KM420 Series (alternately K131) quarter ton Utility Vehicle
- KM450 (K300 series) 1¼ ton modern variant of the M715
- KM500 (K700 series) variant of the M809 truck both as 5 ton and 7 ton variants
- KM1500 (K900 series) 8×8 heavy tactical truck
- K53 Series similar to the Swedish Bandvagn 206 amphibious tracked vehicle

== See also ==
- List of Hyundai engines
- List of Hyundai transmissions
- List of Hyundai vehicles
- List of Genesis vehicles
- Hyundai Motor Company
- Genesis Motor
