= Kia K3 =

Kia K3 may refer to:

- Kia Forte, a compact car known as the K3 in Asia
- Kia K3 (BL7), a subcompact car manufactured since 2023
