= Kia PV5 =

Battery electric van and minivan

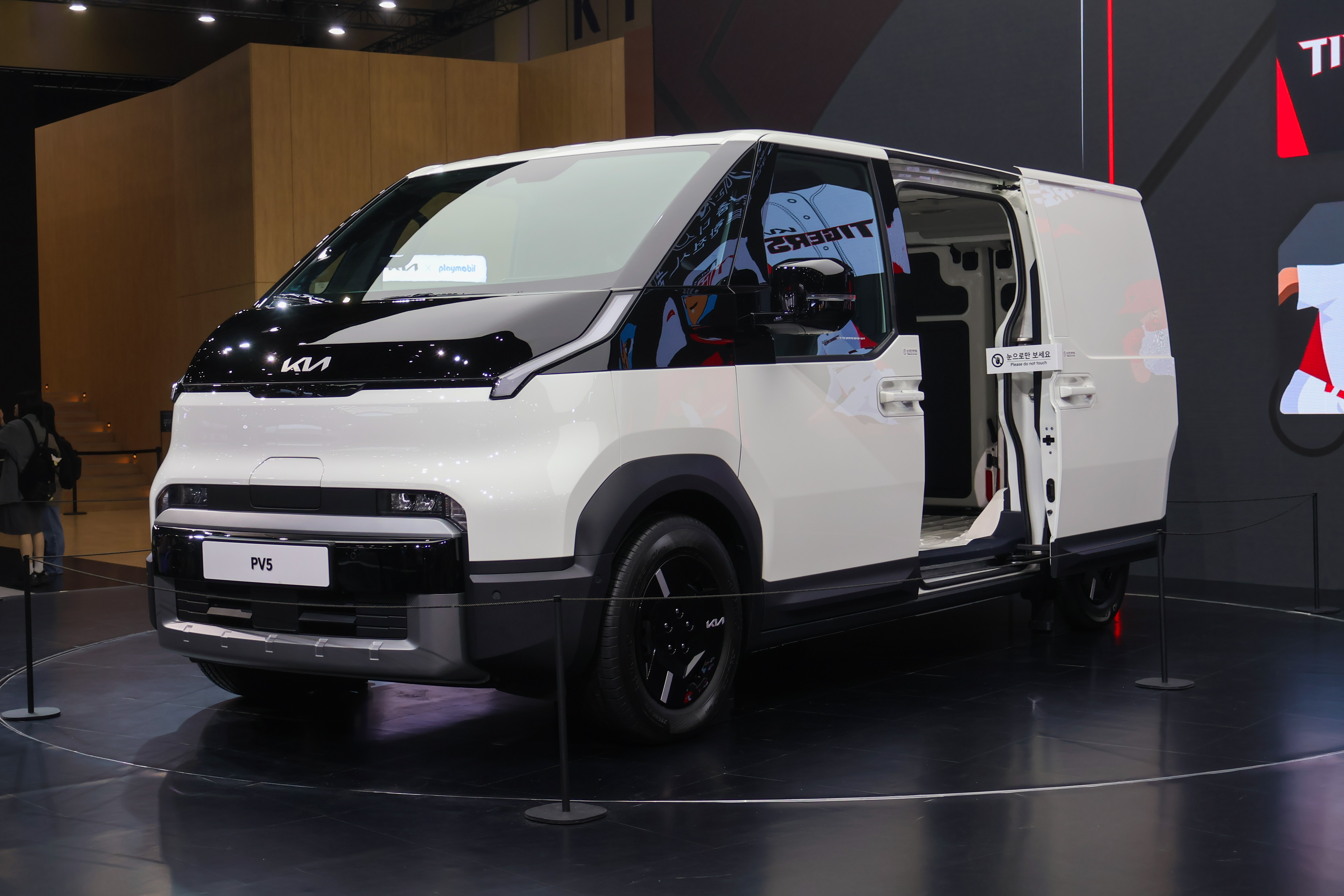

Overview
- Manufacturer: Kia
- Model code: SW1
- Production: 2025–present
- Assembly: South Korea: Hwaseong (Autoland Hwasung)
- Designer: Karim Habib

Body and chassis
- Class: PBV; Minivan; Light commercial vehicle
- Body style: 5-door minivan (Passenger and WAV); 6-door panel van (Cargo); 2-door chassis cab
- Layout: Front-motor, front-wheel-drive
- Platform: E-GMP.S
- Related: Kia PV1 (upcoming); Kia PV7; Kia PV9 (upcoming)

Powertrain
- Electric motor: Permanent Magnet Synchronous Motor on Front Axle
- Power output: 89.4 kilowatts (122 PS; 120 hp)
- Battery: 43.3 kWh CATL 400V Technology LFP (Europe); 51.5 kWh CATL 400V Technology NCM (Standard Range); 71.2 kWh CATL 400V Technology NCM (Long Range)

Dimensions
- Wheelbase: 2,995 mm (117.9 in)
- Length: 4,695 mm (184.8 in), standard; 4,890 mm (192.5 in), long
- Width: 1,895 mm (74.6 in)
- Height: 1,905 mm (75.0 in), standard; 2,200 mm (86.6 in), tall

The Kia PV5 (Korean: 기아 PV5) is a battery electric van and minivan, and PBV produced by Kia since 2025. It is Kia's first-ever dedicated electric van.

Based on the dedicated E-GMP.S platform, it is the first model from the manufacturer's "PV" series.

It is offered in Passenger, Cargo, chassis cab, and wheelchair-accessible versions, while conversion models include leisure, refrigerated, and frozen vehicles, and the PV5 Crew is exclusive to the European market.

== Overview ==
=== Concept ===
The design was previewed when Kia unveiled its purpose-built vehicle concepts, including the PV5, in January 2024.

=== Production model ===
A year later, the production-spec PV5 was first introduced at CES, and fully unveiled alongside the EV2 and EV4 at the 2025 Kia EV Day in Spain on 24 February 2025.

Pre-orders for the PV5 began in South Korea and Europe in the first half of 2025.

The PV5 is an electric van built with an upper body on top of a flat and wide E-GMP.S (service) platform. The E-GMP.S platform was developed based on the Hyundai Electric Global Modular Platform (E-GMP) platform introduced in 2021 to reflect the needs of potential customers in various industries. It is the first model of Kia's PBV series, the PV.

It is designed for various operational purposes such as passenger transport, cargo transport, and wheelchair user assistance, and can be expanded into other forms. It will be released as a basic model for each main purpose, including "Passenger", "Cargo", and "WAV" (Wheelchair Accessible Vehicle). WAV has convenience features for wheelchair users. In addition to the basic models, there will also be a number of conversion PV5 lineups produced and guaranteed by Kia. These include the "Light Camper" optimized for leisure and relaxation, the "Prime" and "Open Bed" luxury passenger models, and the "Crew" exclusive to Europe.

It is equipped with a 12.9-inch screen display with a 16:9 ratio and an infotainment system based on the Android Automotive Operating System.

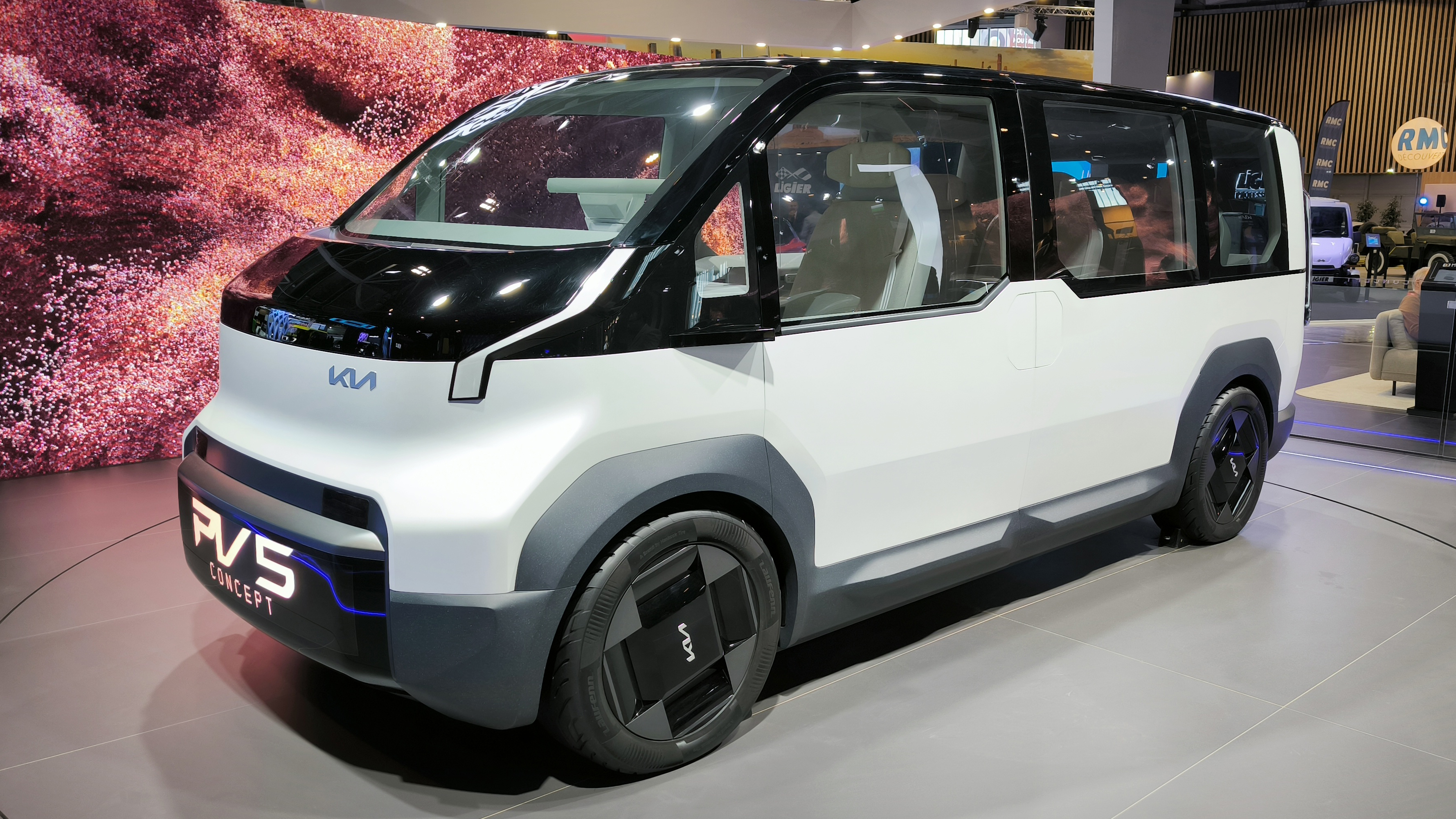
PV5 Passenger Concept

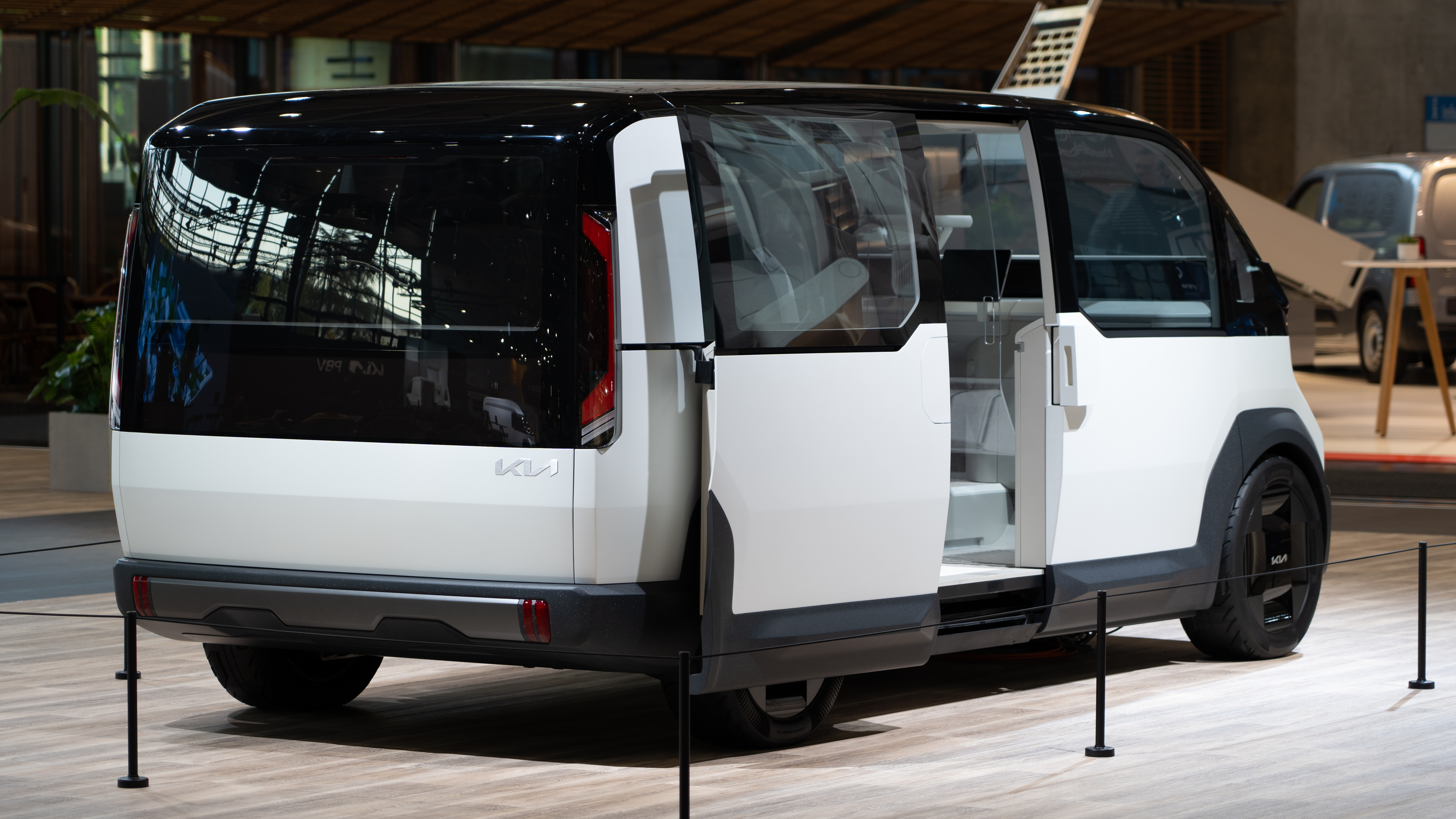
Rear view (Concept)

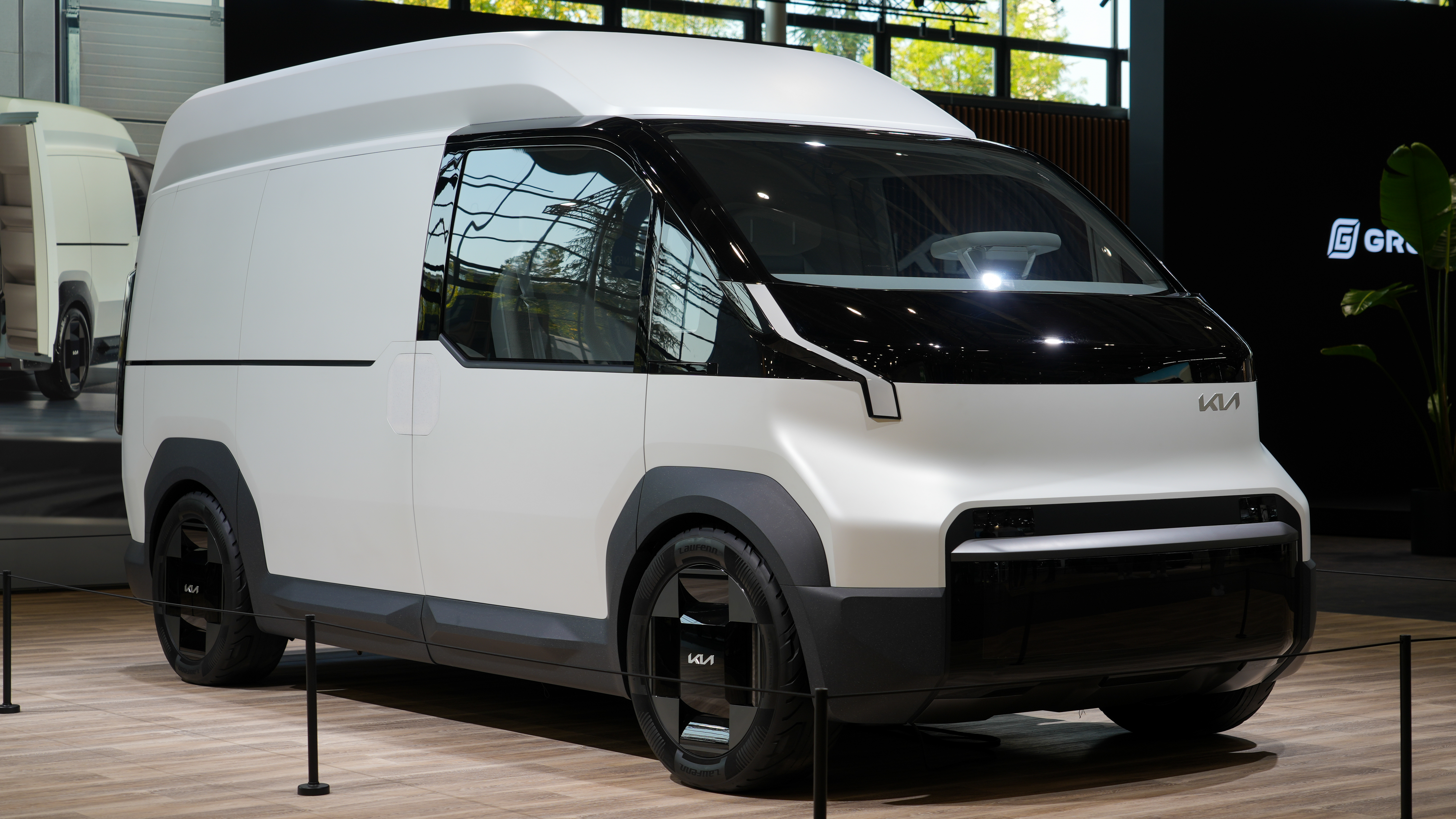
PV5 High-Roof Concept

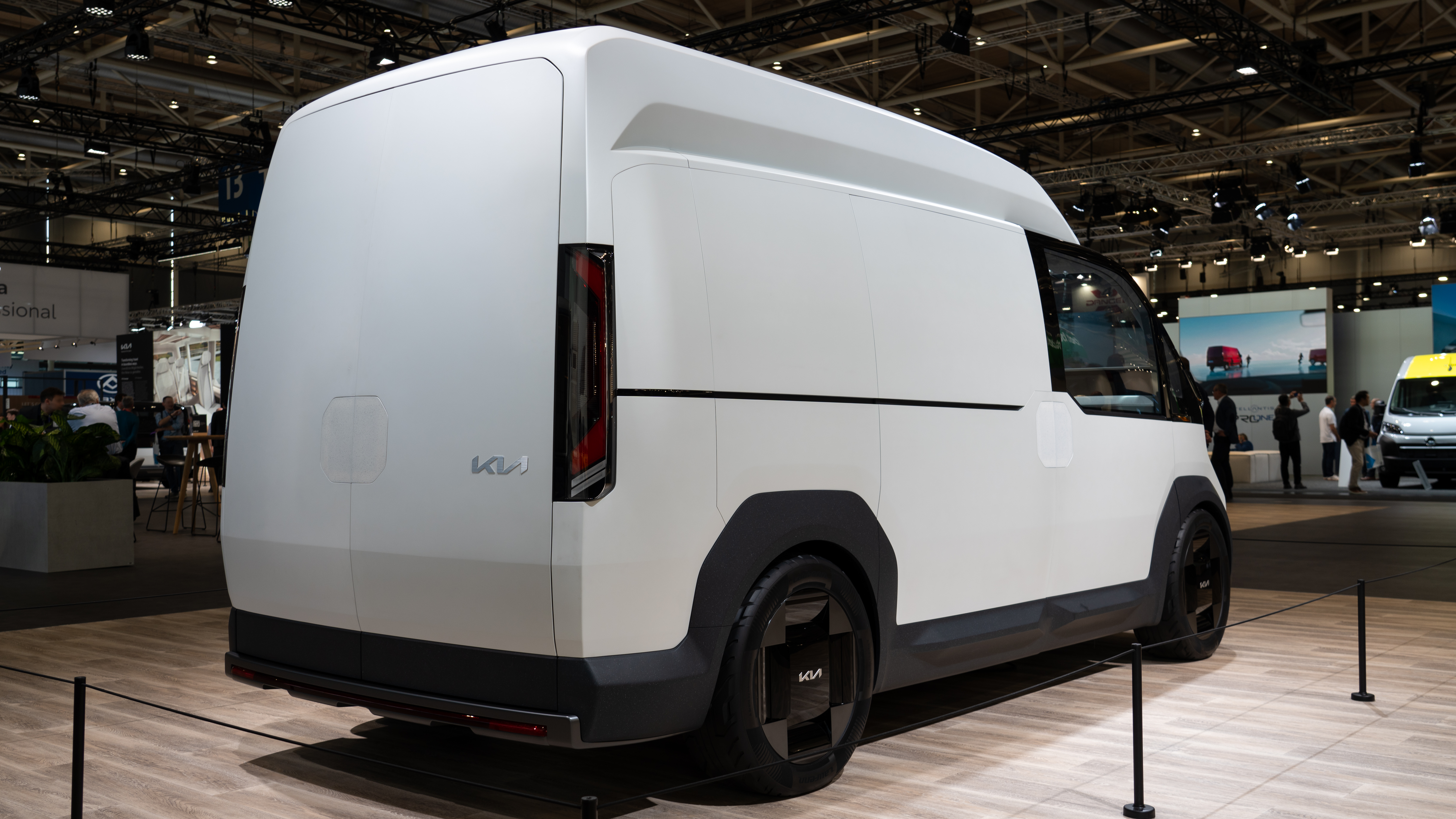
Rear view (Concept)

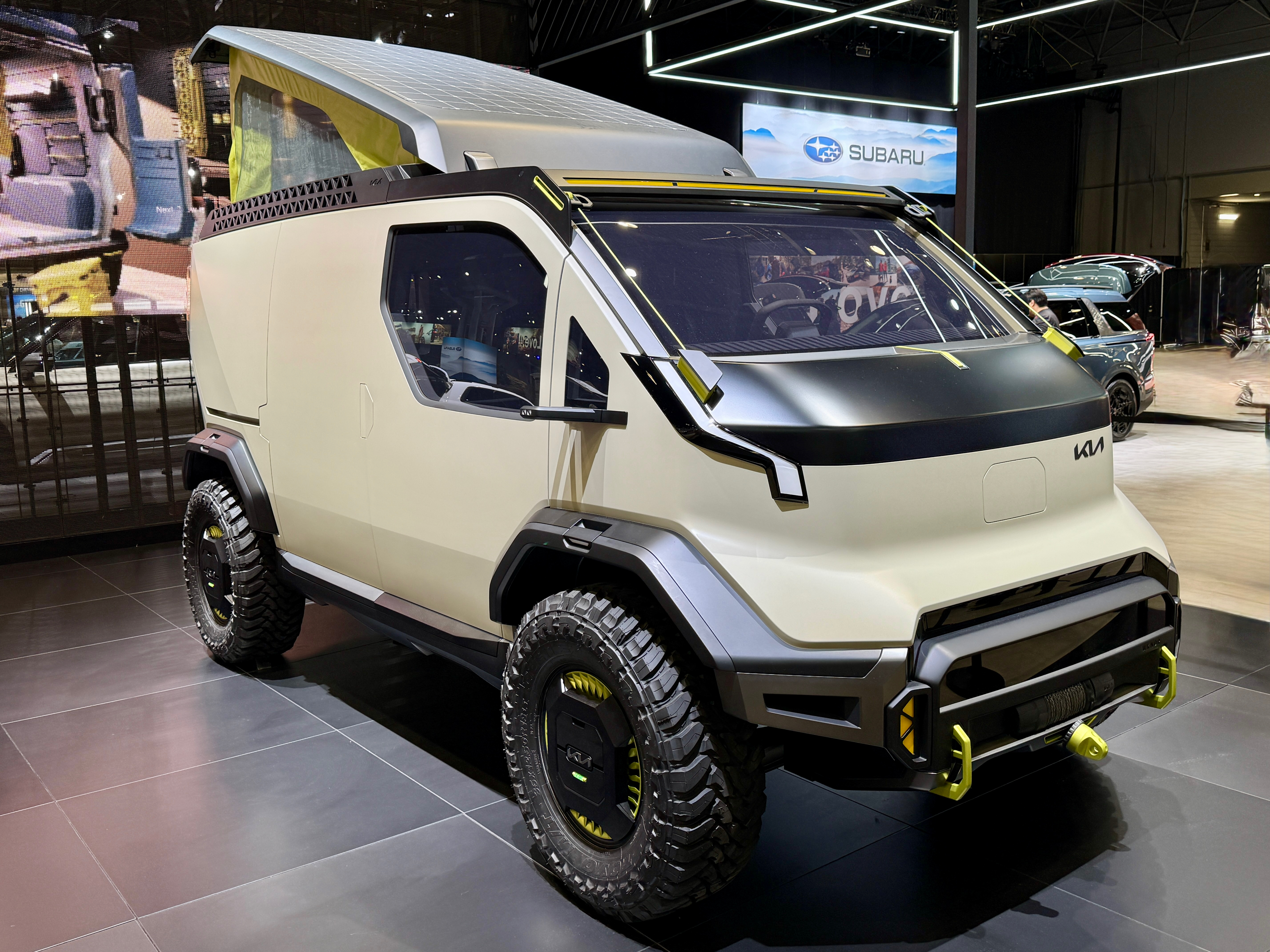
PV5 WKNDR Concept

== Design ==
The platform Kia AdGear was introduced for the first time, allowing users to select cup holders, hangers, as desired. It is a platform that allows users to add items to the interior of their vehicles that meet their needs.

== Versions ==
=== Passenger ===
The Kia PV5 Passenger is a passenger transportation service model. The passenger space is equipped with convenient features such as a USB charging terminal and seat heating switch. The arrangement of the seats in the First to Third rows can be changed depending on the number of passengers and purpose. It is equipped with a NCM battery with a capacity of 71.2 kWh.

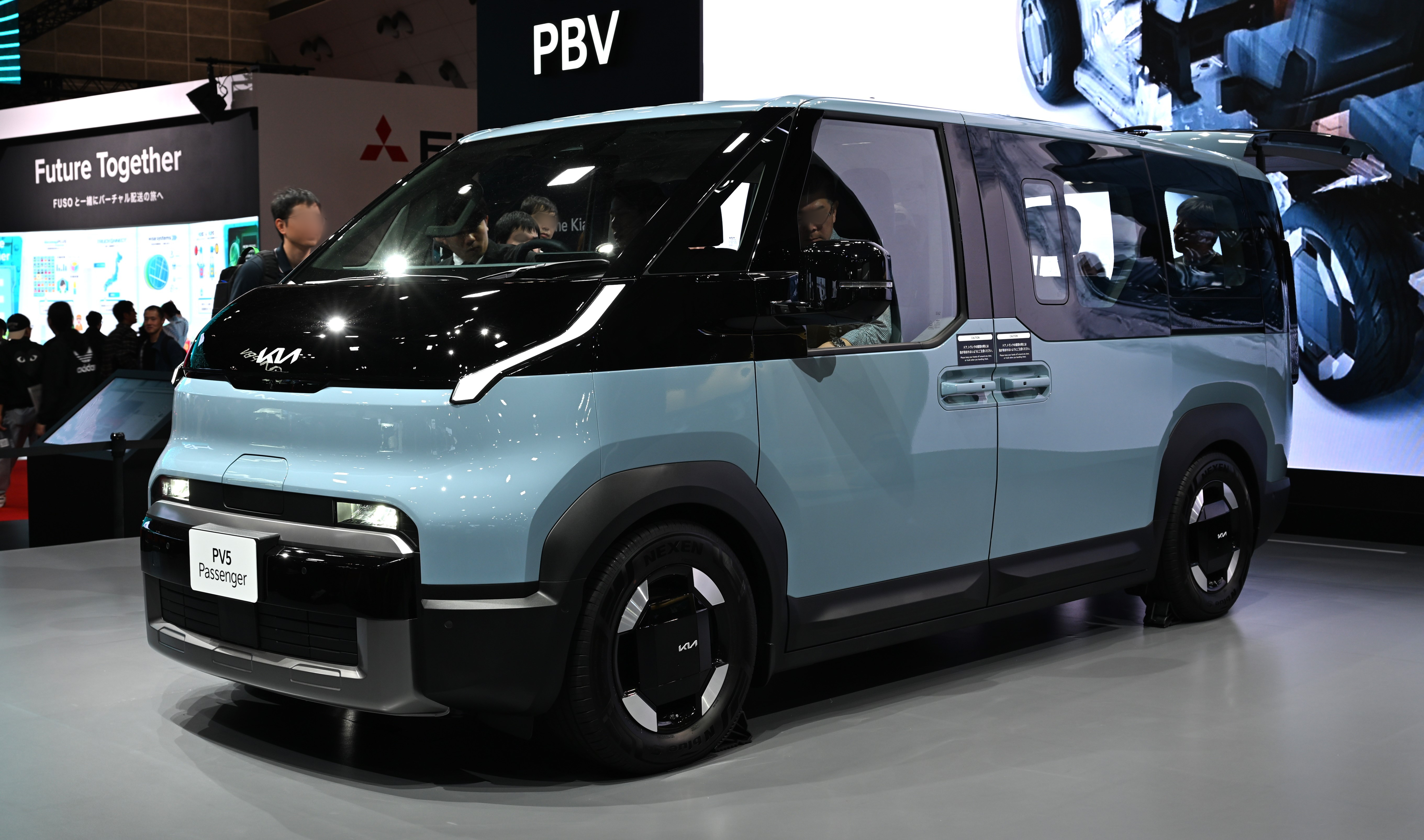
Front

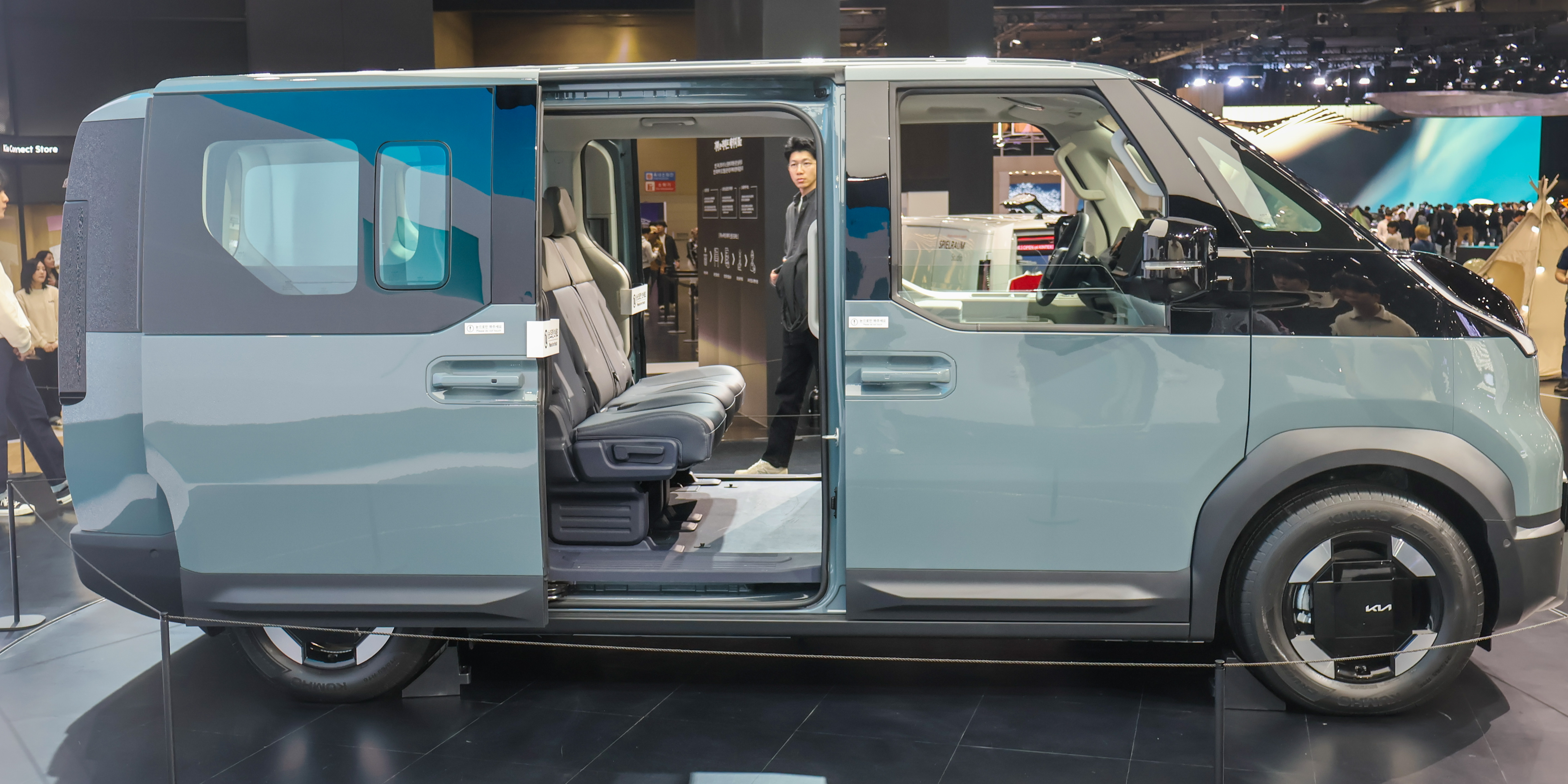
2nd row

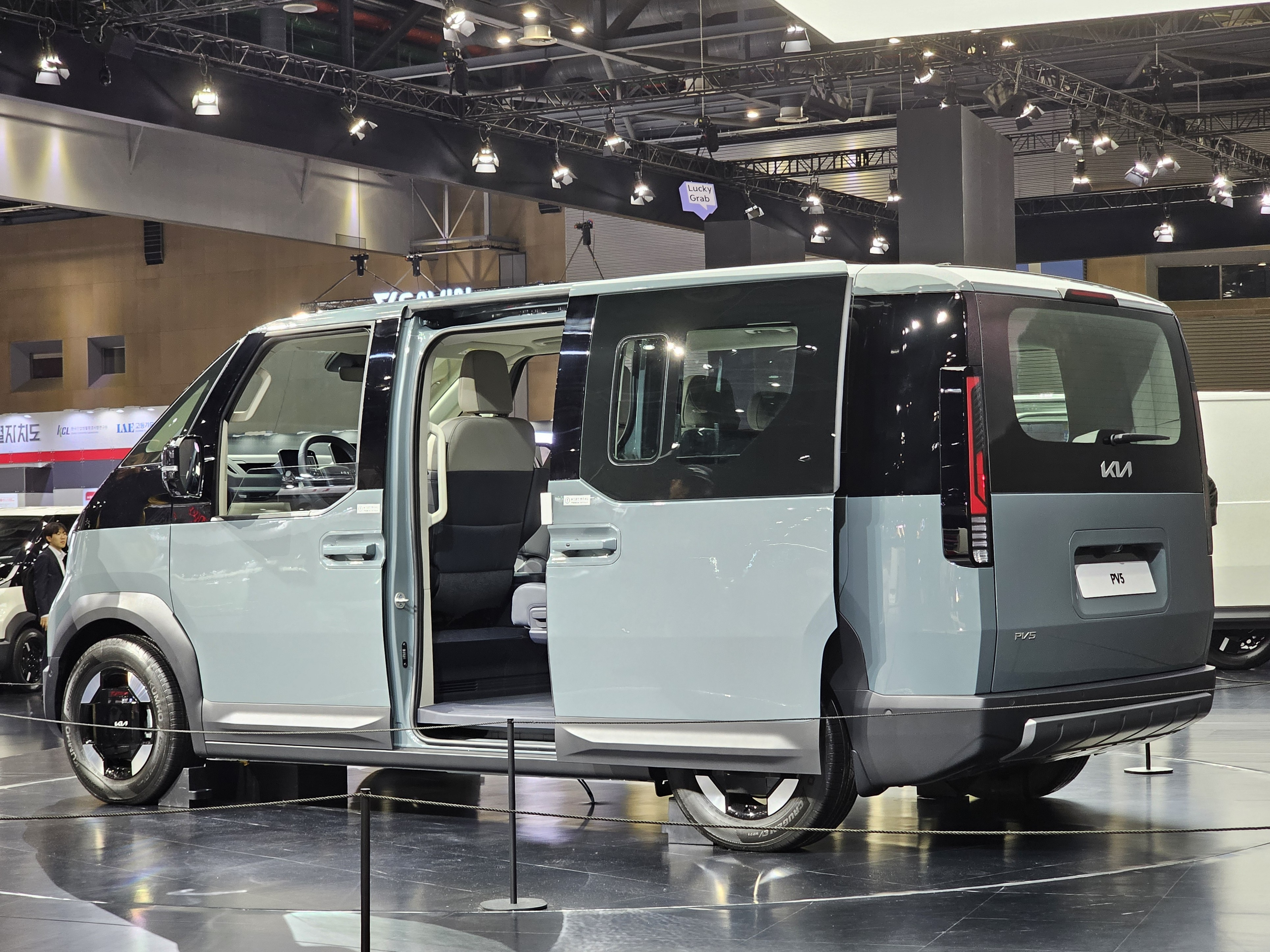
Rear view

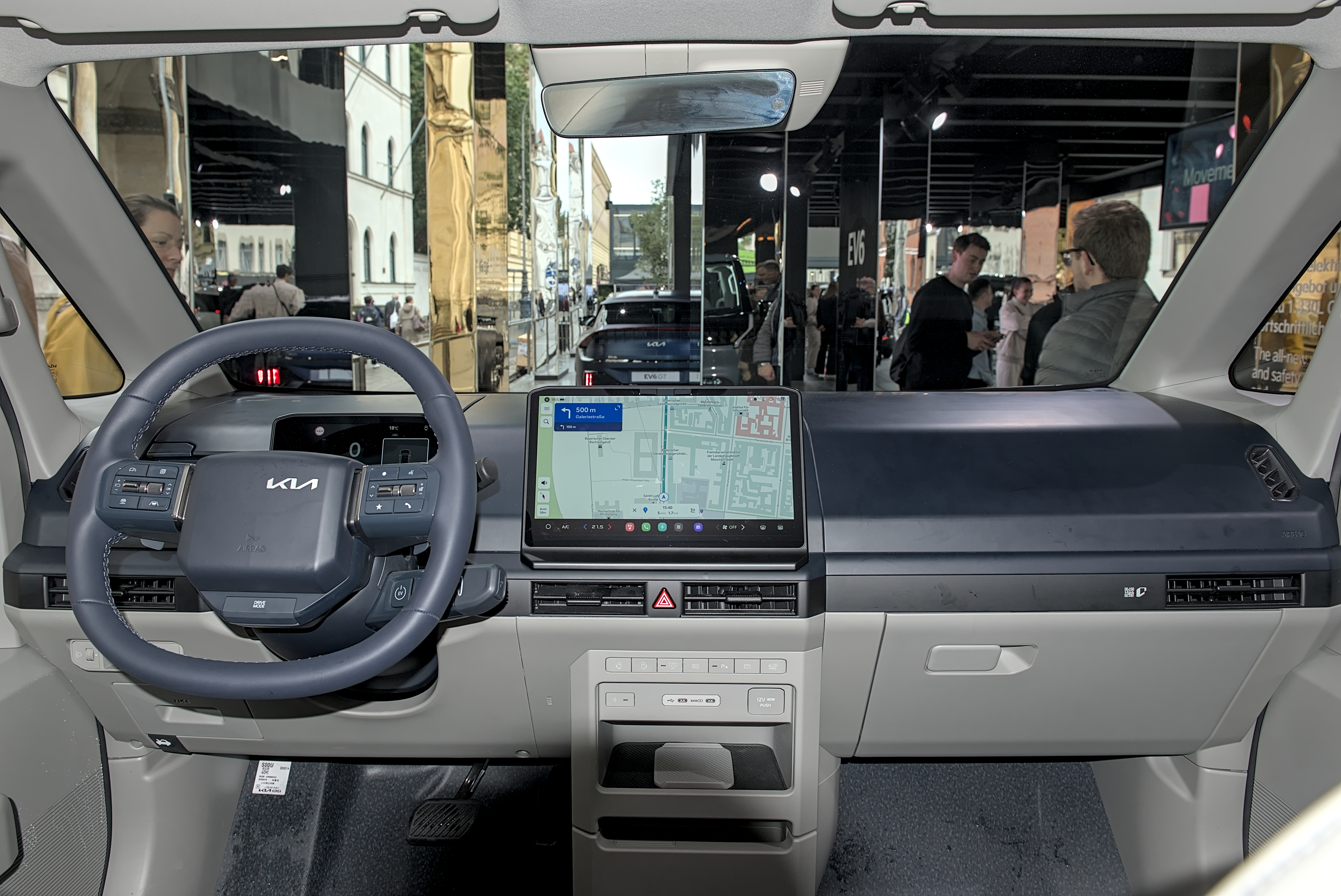
Interior

=== Cargo ===
The Kia PV5 Cargo is divided into three detailed models: Compact, Long, and High Roof, depending on the loading capacity. The cargo space is equipped with an L-track mounting that can be equipped with lights, nets, and fasteners, and has a V2L function. It is equipped with a NCM battery with a capacity of 71.2 kWh or 51.5 kWh. In the European market, a model with a 43.3 kWh LFP battery is also available.

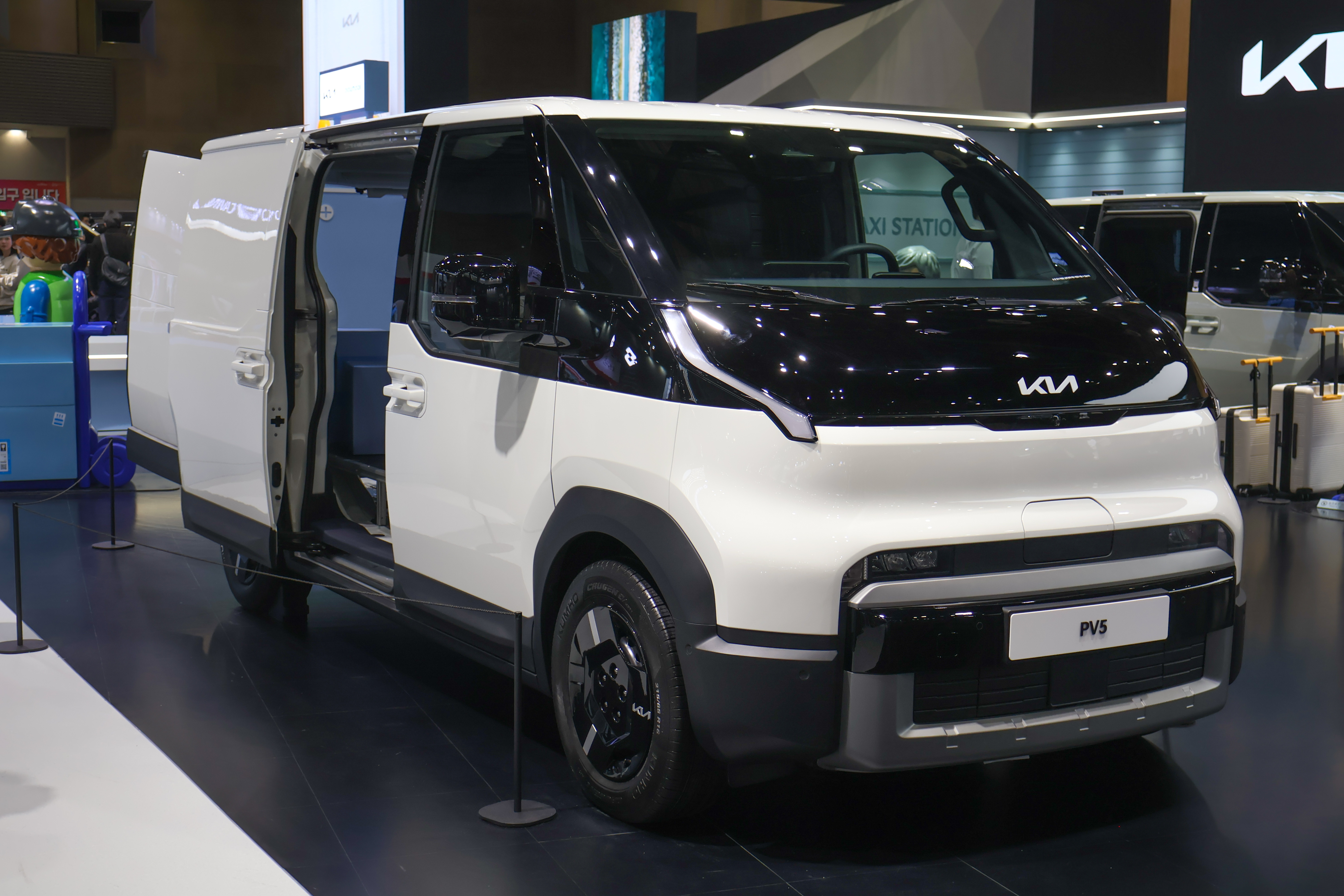
Front

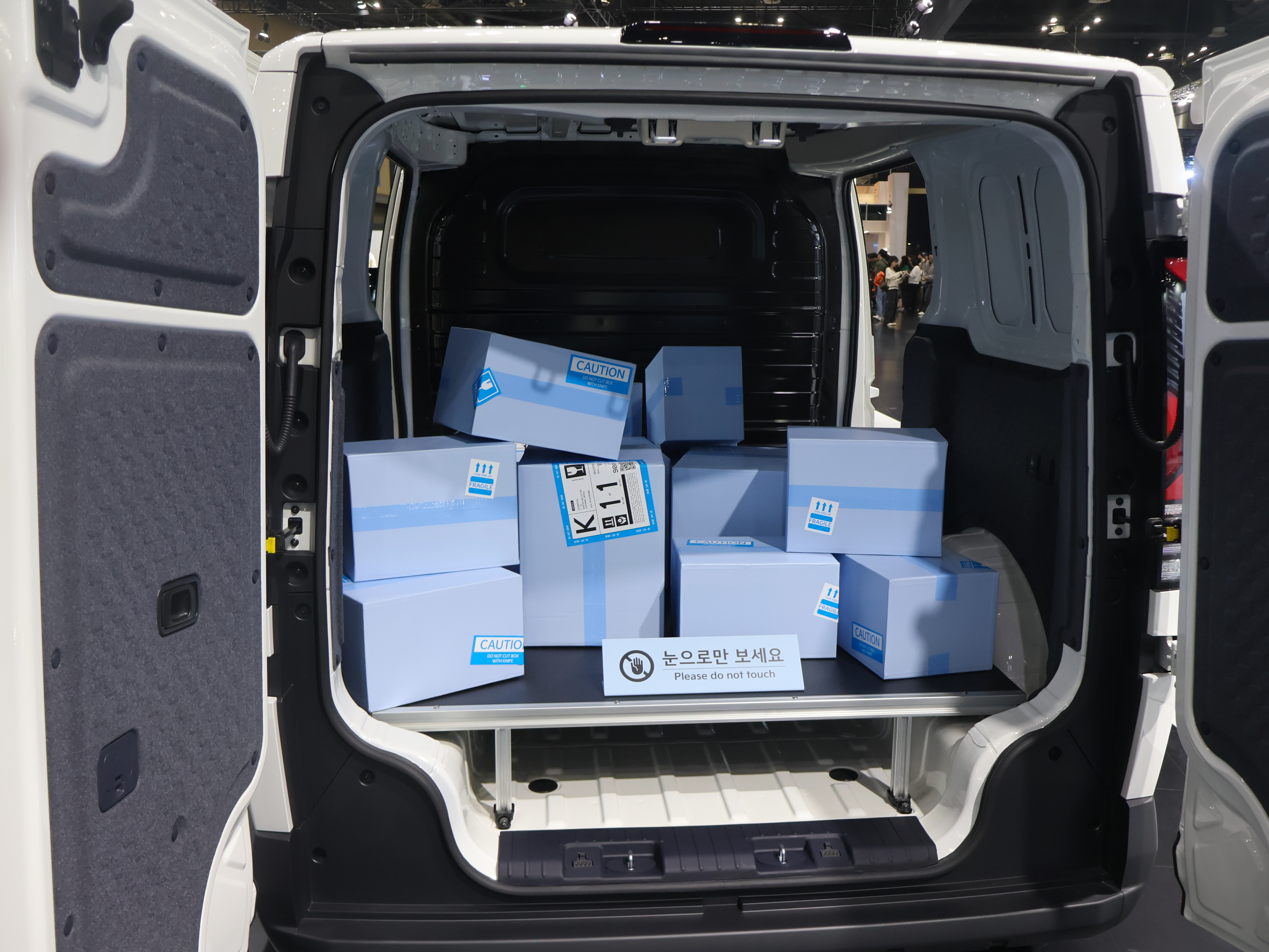
Loading space

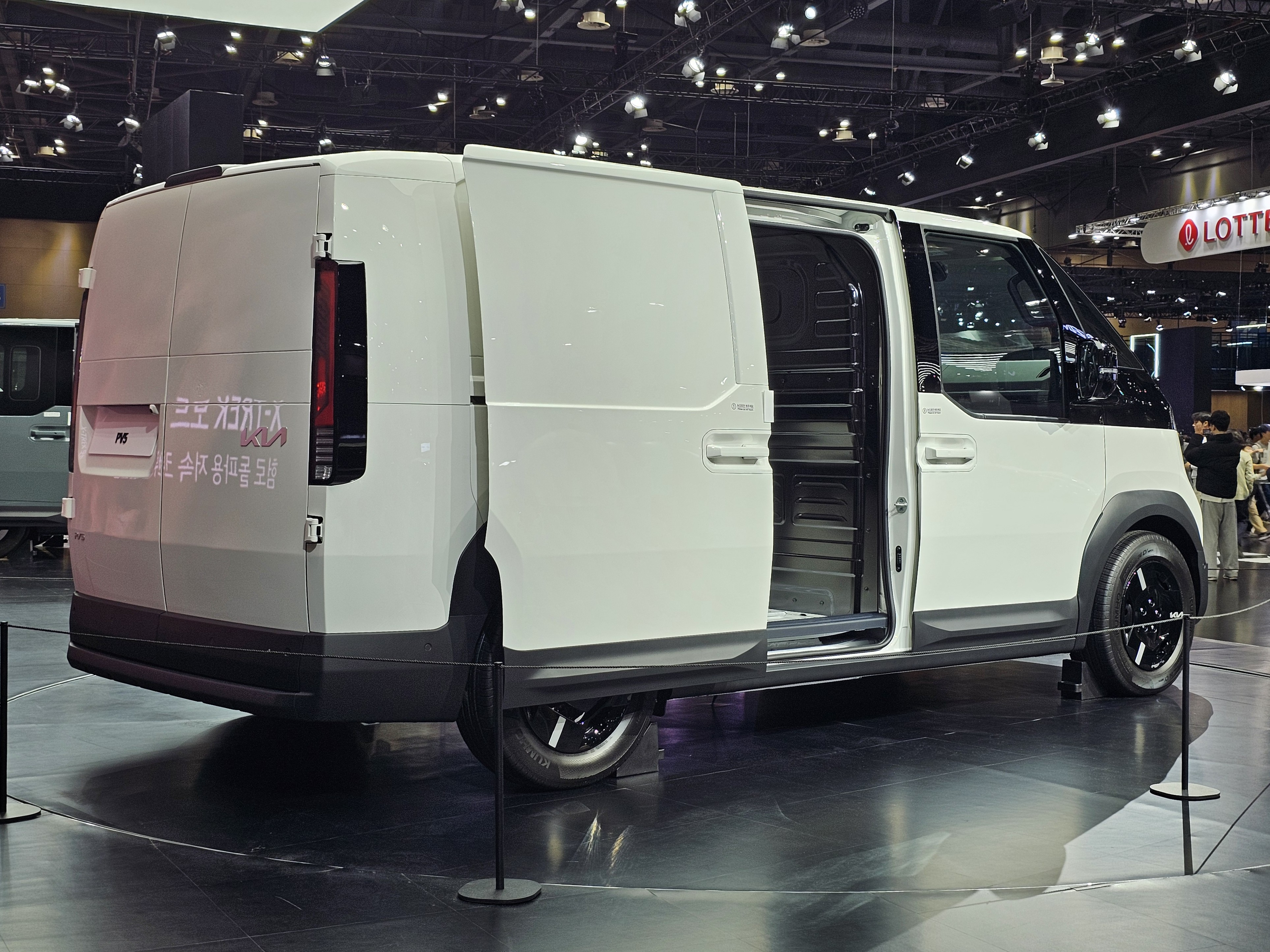
Rear view

=== WAV ===
The Kia PV5 WAV (Wheelchair Accessible Vehicle) has a side-mounted boarding and disembarkation system to allow wheelchair users, such as those with disabilities, to board the second row of the vehicle from sidewalk. A third-row tip-up seat has been installed to allow accompanying guardians to assist passengers.

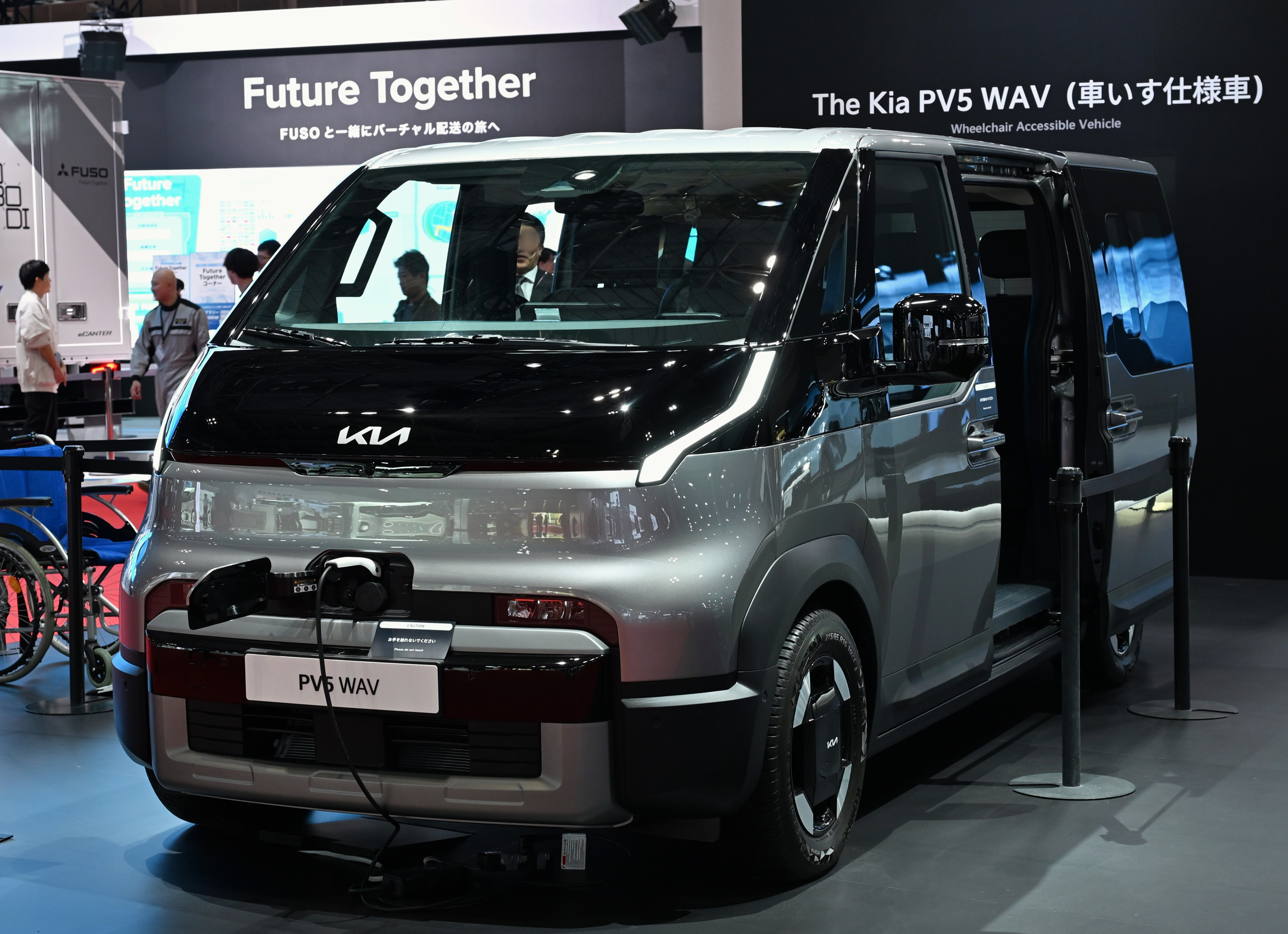
Front

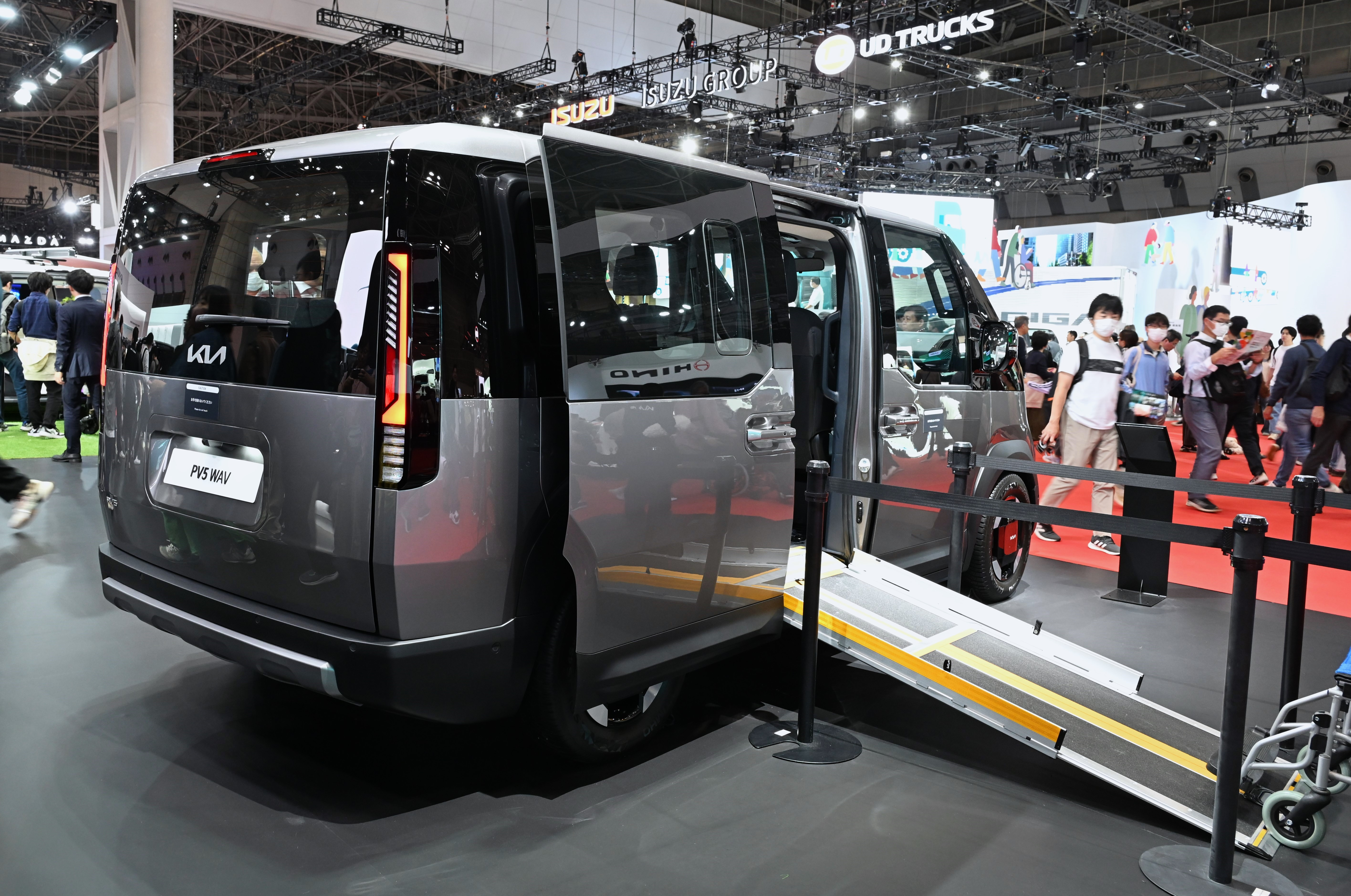
Rear view

== Markets ==
The PV5 launched the Cargo Long and Passenger 5-seater models in Korea and Europe in 2025. Cumulative sales in the European market exceeded 10,000 units by June 2026, half a year after sales began in November 2025.

=== Australia ===
The PV5 is scheduled to launch in the Australian market by mid-2026, aiming to compete with the Toyota HiAce. It will be offered in passenger, cargo, and chassis cab configurations.

=== Canada ===
The PV5 is set to launch in the Canadian market by the fourth quarter of 2026; however, it will initially only be available as a cargo van. The van will come equipped with an NACS port and an 11-kW onboard charger, with a 22-kW option expected to be available at a later date.

=== Japan ===
The PV5 was launched in Japan on 13 May 2026. It is offered in passsenger and cargo configurations. The van will come equipped with an CHAdeMO and an bi-directional V2X.

=== Middle East ===
The PV5 was unveiled in the Middle East and Africa at the Museum of the Future in Dubai, United Arab Emirates, on 24 June 2026, marking the regional debut of Kia's first all-electric "Platform Beyond Vehicle" (PBV).

=== Philippines ===
The PV5 Cargo was launched in the Philippines on 22 October 2026, in the sole Standard Range variant.

=== Thailand ===
The PV5 Cargo was launched in Thailand on 4 August 2026, in the sole Standard Range variant.

== Safety ==
Euro NCAP test results Kia PV5 Passenger 120kW (2025)
Test	Points	%
Overall:	4 /5 stars	
Adult occupant:	33.6	83%
Child occupant:	41.8	85%
Pedestrian:	40.8	64%
Safety assist:	11.8	65%

Euro NCAP test results Kia PV5 Cargo (2025)
Test	Score
Overall:	5 /5 stars
Safe driving	75%
Crash avoidance	80%
Post crash	80%

ANCAP test results Kia PV5 Cargo (2025)
Overall
Grading:	91% (Platinum)

== Sales ==
Year	South Korea	Europe	Global
2025			15,853
