= Purpose-Built Vehicle =

Customized transportation

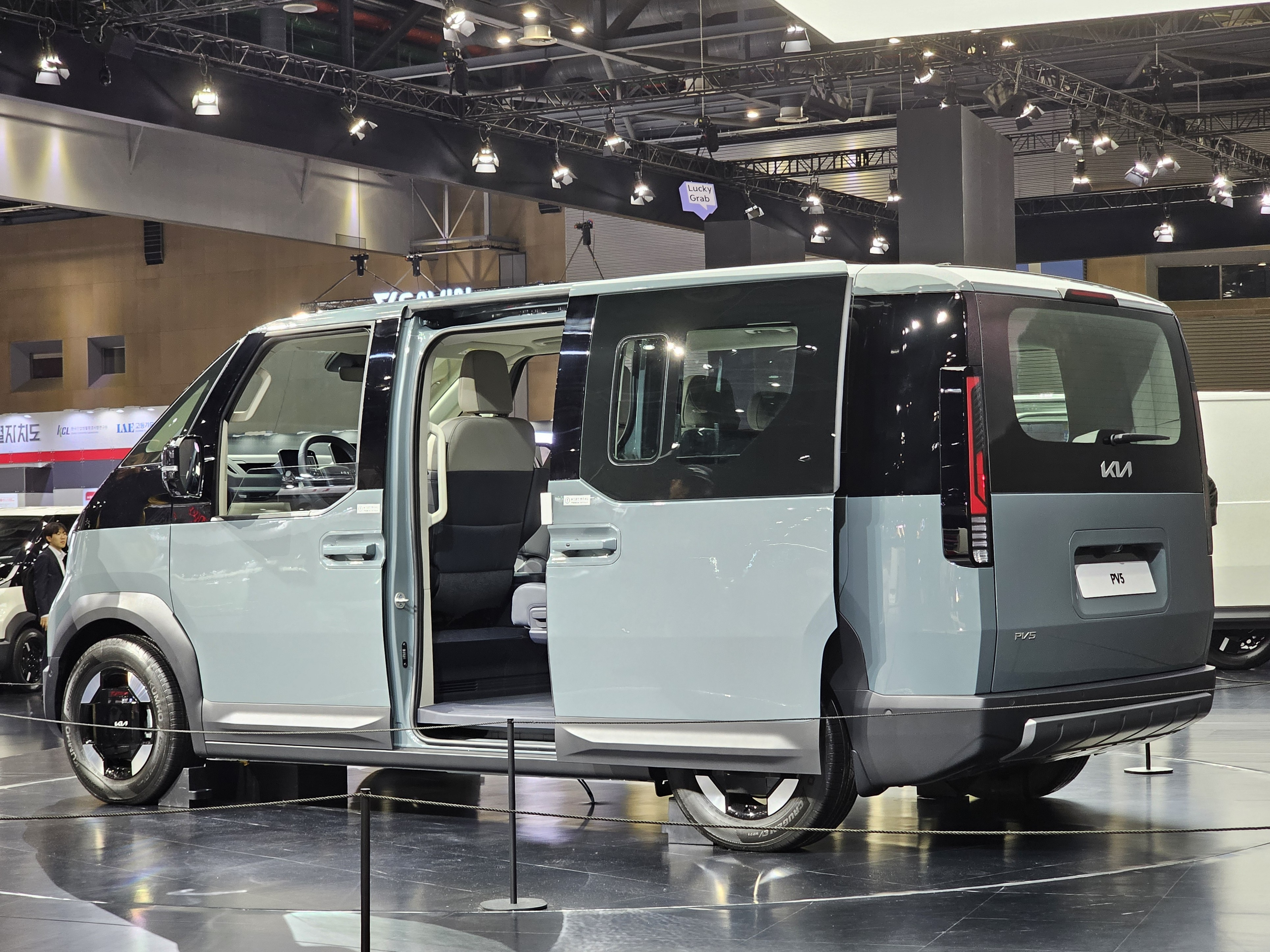
PV5 Passenger, the first model of the Kia PV series

Purpose-Built Vehicle (Korean: 목적 기반 모빌리티, PBV) is a vehicle that can be manufactured in various forms according to the user's purpose. It was presented by Hyundai Motor Company in 2020.

As of 2026, there is one PBV model from Hyundai Motors and two models from Kia.

== Overview ==
On January 6, 2020, Chung Eui-sun, Executive Vice Chairman of Hyundai Motor Group, presented three specific visions for the future mobility business combining air and ground transportation at the CES 2020, and one of them is Purpose-Built Vehicle, PBV. It can share a basic platform but have different appearances and functions depending on their intended use.

In January 2024, Kia unveiled three PBV concept cars at the CES 2024, including the mid-size PV5, the compact PV1, and the large PV7.

== Platform ==
The PBV platform is implemented based on E-GMP.S (Service), which is developed and based on the Hyundai Electric Global Modular Platform (E-GMP) that was unveiled in 2021. It was developed as a skateboard platform concept that can apply various upper bodies on a flat platform, so it can be applied to a wide range of product lineups from small to large PBVs.

== Models ==
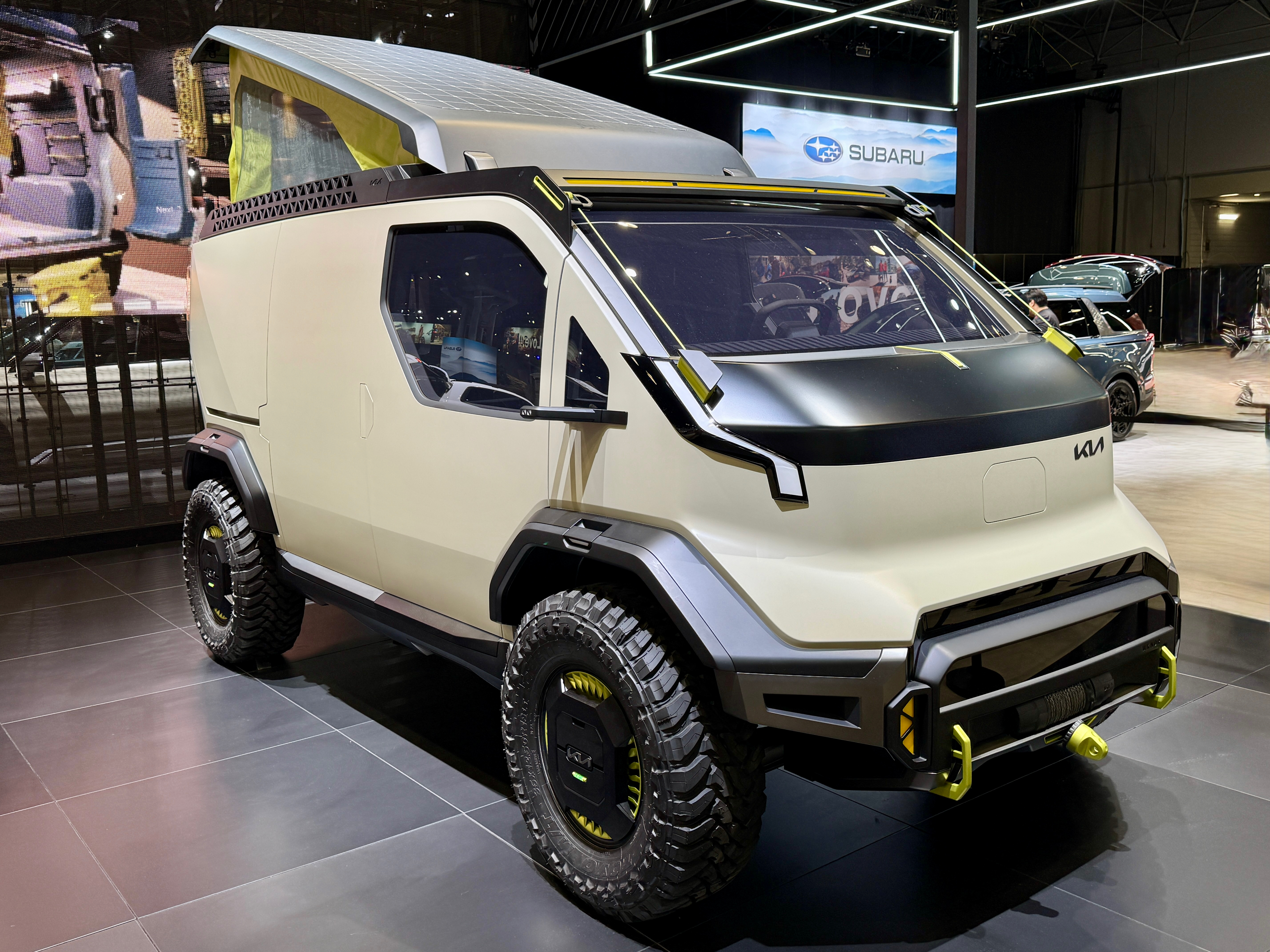
Kia PV5 WKNDR

=== Productions models ===
Name		Production	Image
Kia Niro Plus		2022–2024	
Hyundai ST1		2024–present	
Kia PV5	Passenger	2025–present	
Kia PV5	Cargo	2025–present	
Kia PV5	Chassis Cab	2025–present	
Kia PV7	Passenger	2026–present	
Kia PV7	Cargo	2026–present	

=== Concepts ===
- PV1
- PV5 WKNDR
- PV9
