= Kia PV7 =

Battery electric full-size van

Overview
- Manufacturer: Kia
- Model code: LW1
- Production: 2026–present
- Assembly: South Korea: Hwaseong (Autoland Hwasung)
- Designer: Karim Habib

Body and chassis
- Class: PBV; Full-size van; Light commercial vehicle
- Body style: 5-door van (Passenger and WAV); 6-door panel van (Cargo); 2-door chassis cab
- Layout: Front-motor, front-wheel-drive; Dual-motor, all-wheel-drive
- Platform: E-GMP.S
- Related: Kia PV1 (upcoming); Kia PV5; Kia PV9 (upcoming)

Powertrain
- Electric motor: Permanent Magnet Synchronous Motor on Front Axle
- Power output: 268 horsepower (200 kW; 272 PS)
- Battery: 71.5 kWh (Standard Range); 96.2 kWh (Long Range)

Dimensions
- Length: 5,350 mm (210.6 in)

The Kia PV7 (Korean: 기아 PV7) is a battery electric full-size van and PBV produced by Kia since late 2026. It is the second model from the manufacturer's "PV" series lineup after the PV5.

The PV7 is the all-electric alternative to the Carnival, designed to offer more interior space and a broader range of applications for businesses, fleet operators, and lifestyle users, whereas the PV5 is a smaller-to-midsize electric van that is positioned below its larger sibling.

== Development ==
=== Concept ===
The PV7 was first previewed as the Kia Concept PV7 at the 2024 Consumer Electronics Show (CES) on 8 January 2024.

It is positioned as a battery electric full-size van that slots above the PV5, thanks to its significantly larger dimensions to increase interior space, transport a large number of passengers, and carry oversized cargo.

PV7 Cargo Concept

Side view (concept)

Rear view (concept)

=== Production model ===
Two years later, after the Concept PV7 in early 2024, at the end of August 2026, the first teaser images and videos of the production-spec PV7 were unveiled.

A month later, the production-spec PV7 was fully and officially unveiled at the International Motor Show Germany 2026 in Hanover, Germany on September 14 of the same year, and it stays true to the concept model but in a more realistic shape, as the Kia's second dedicated electric van after the PV5.

== Overview ==
=== Design ===
==== Exterior ====
The PV7 features an upright posture with a bold, boxy, and snub-nosed silhouette designed to maximize interior volume and facilitate tight urban navigation. It incorporates contrasting black trim elements for the hood and pillars, creating a sharp visual separation that mirrors the aesthetic of its smaller sibling, the PV5, and its distinct modern front and rear LED light signatures that solidify a unified corporate face for Kia’s commercial EV fleet.

==== Interior ====
Inside the PV7, it features a 14.6-inch central display powered by the Hyundai Motor Group's Pleos operating system, including artificial intelligence integrations and the ability to install third-party applications.

=== Body styles ===
The PV7 is offered in Passenger, Cargo, and 2-door chassis cab options, similar to the PV5 lineup. The Passenger models can be equipped with either 7-, 9-, or 11-seat configurations, while the Cargo models offer either a 2- or 3-seat first-row configuration. Behind the first-row seats, the Cargo models offer over 6 m^{3} (210 cu ft) of space, while other versions, including the expandable roof, have over 8.1 m^{3} (290 cu ft). The payload is rated up to 1,165 kg (2,568 lb).

=== Platform ===
The PV7 is based on the same dedicated E-GMP.S platform, shared with the PV5, albeit with a significantly stretched body, longer wheelbase, and bigger interior space.

==== Architecture ====
The PV7 features the 800-volt architecture, which marks Kia's third dedicated electric vehicle to feature that architecture after the EV6 (in 2021) and EV9 (in 2023).

==== Powertrain ====
Unlike the PV5, the PV7 is offered in both single-motor, front-wheel-drive and dual-motor, all-wheel-drive. The former launches first, with a front-mounted motor producing a total power output of 268 hp (200 kW; 272 PS) and 310 lb⋅ft (420 N⋅m) of torque.

Two nickel cobalt manganese (NMC) batteries are available – a 71.5 kWh module for Standard Range models and a larger 96.3 kWh module for Long Range models, with the latter providing a range of up to 286 mi (460 km). Using a 350 kW DC fast charger, the PV7 can charge from 20% to 80% in 20 minutes.

== Production and availability ==
=== Factory plant ===
The PV7 is being produced at Kia's Autoland Hwasung plant in Hwaseong, specifically at the EVO Plant West facility located southwest of Seoul in South Korea, where it is built alongside its smaller sibling, the PV5, with production commencing in late 2026.

=== Markets ===
The PV7 will be offered first in Korea and Europe. Then, it will soon be offered in other global markets, including Australia, New Zealand, and parts of Asia.

For North America, no decision has been made by Kia to bring the PV7 to the United States as a competitor to the Ford E-Transit and Mercedes-Benz eSprinter, while Canada is possible, under consideration, and yet to be confirmed that would slot above the PV5 at a higher price.

== Competitors ==
In Europe, even as an electric full-size van and light commercial vehicle, the Kia PV7 rivals the Ford E-Transit Custom, Mercedes-Benz eVito, Renault Trafic E-Tech, and Volkswagen e-Transporter / e-Caravelle.
