= Hyundai ST1 =

Battery electric light commercial vehicle

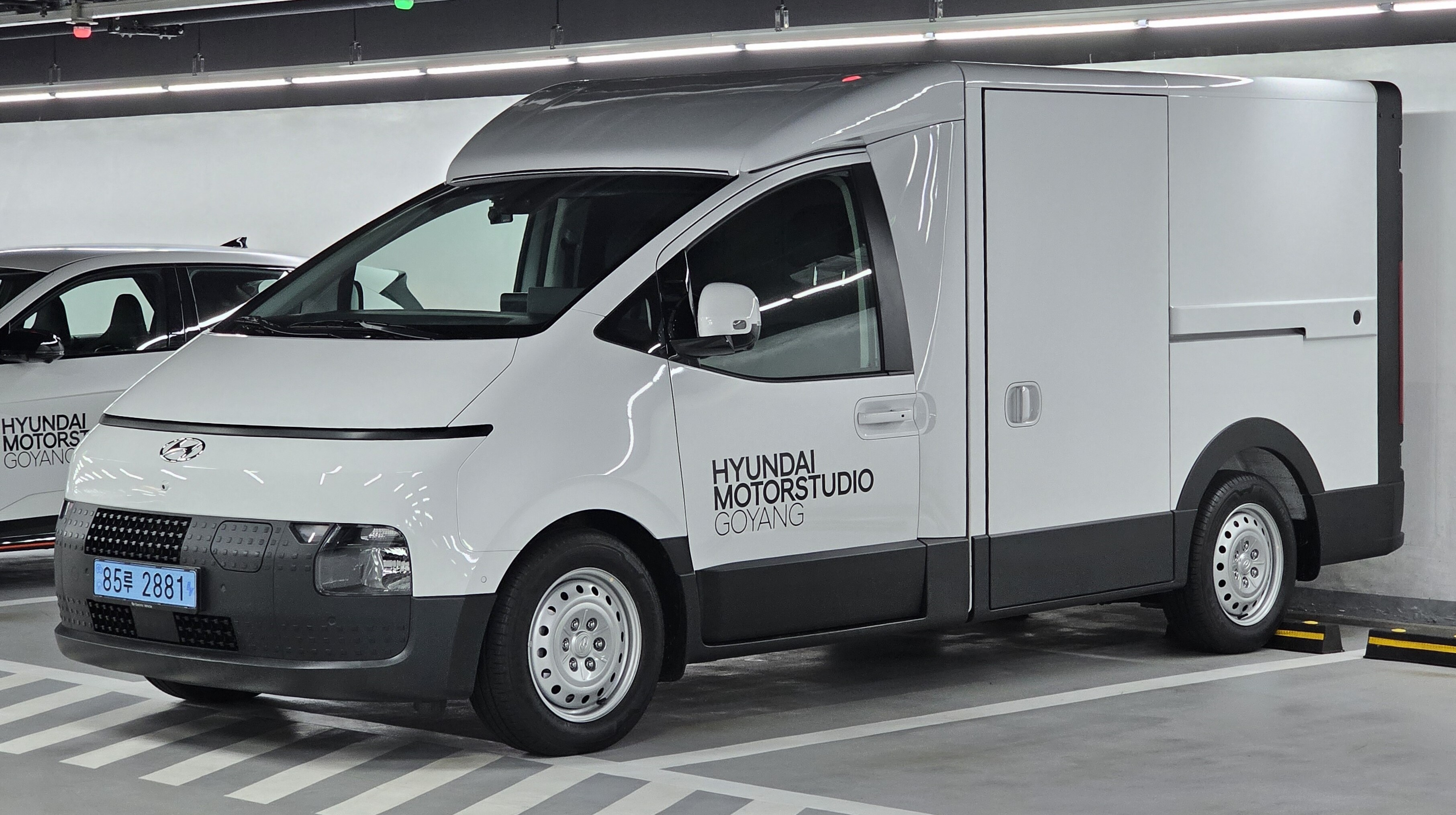

Overview
- Manufacturer: Hyundai
- Model code: A01; PBV LAB EP. 01
- Also called: Iveco eMoovy
- Production: 2024–present
- Assembly: South Korea: Ulsan (Ulsan Plant 4)
- Designer: Joon Seo

Body and chassis
- Class: Light commercial vehicle
- Body style: 2-door pickup truck / cab chassis; 4-door van
- Layout: Front-motor, front-wheel-drive
- Platform: Hyundai-Kia N3
- Related: Hyundai Staria

Powertrain
- Electric motor: Permanent magnet synchronous
- Power output: 160 kW (215 hp; 218 PS)
- Battery: 76.1 kWh NMC SK On
- Electric range: 298–317 km (185–197 mi) (WLTP)
- Plug-in charging: 11 kW (AC); 350 kW (DC)

Dimensions
- Wheelbase: 3,500 mm (137.8 in)
- Length: 5,625 mm (221.5 in)
- Width: 2,015 mm (79.3 in)
- Height: 2,230 mm (87.8 in)
- Curb weight: 2,365–2,510 kg (5,214–5,534 lb)

Chronology
- Predecessor: Hyundai Libero

The Hyundai ST1 is a battery electric light commercial vehicle manufactured by Hyundai since 2024. Described by the company as a Purpose-Built Vehicle (PBV), the ST1 is built with a cabin and dashboard from the Staria, with a boxed rear body. ST1 stands for "Service Type 1".

== Overview ==
The ST1 was introduced in March 2024. It is equipped with a 76.1 kWh battery from SK On with an electric range of 317 km (197 mi) for the standard cargo model and 298 km (185 mi) for refrigerated cargo model.

In September 2024, the vehicle was introduced in Europe by the Italian manufacturer Iveco, as the Iveco eMoovy.

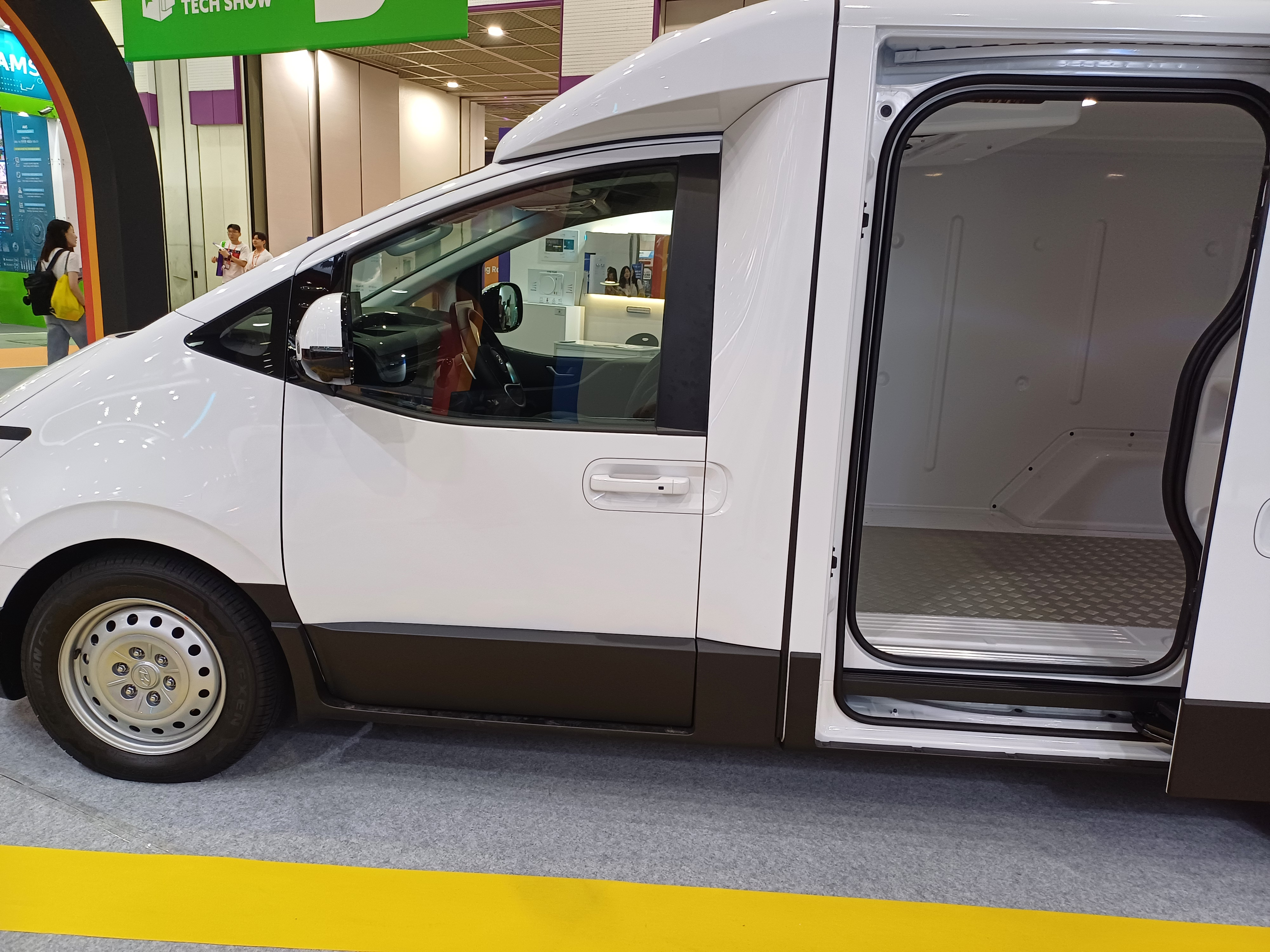
Side view

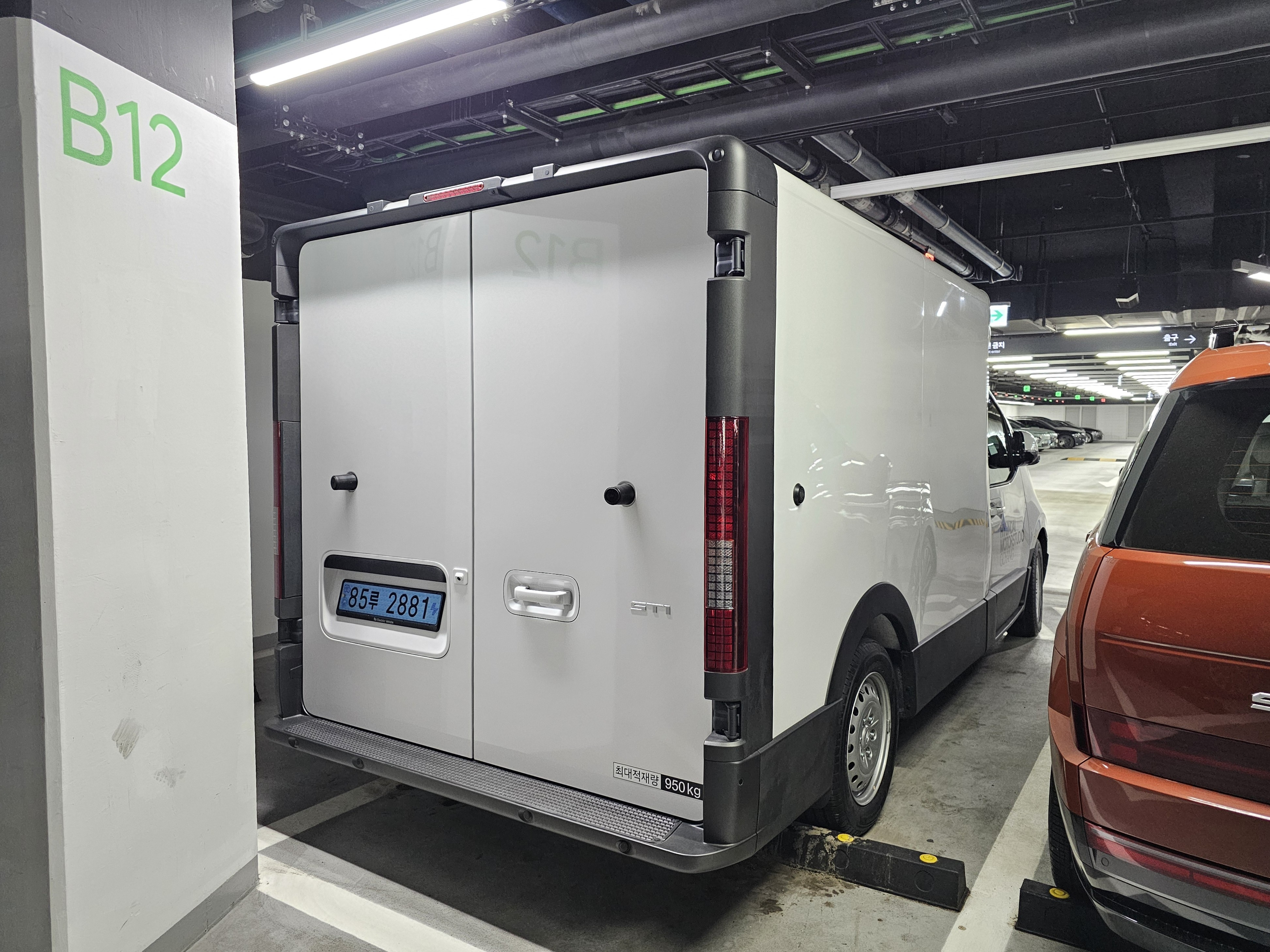
Rear view

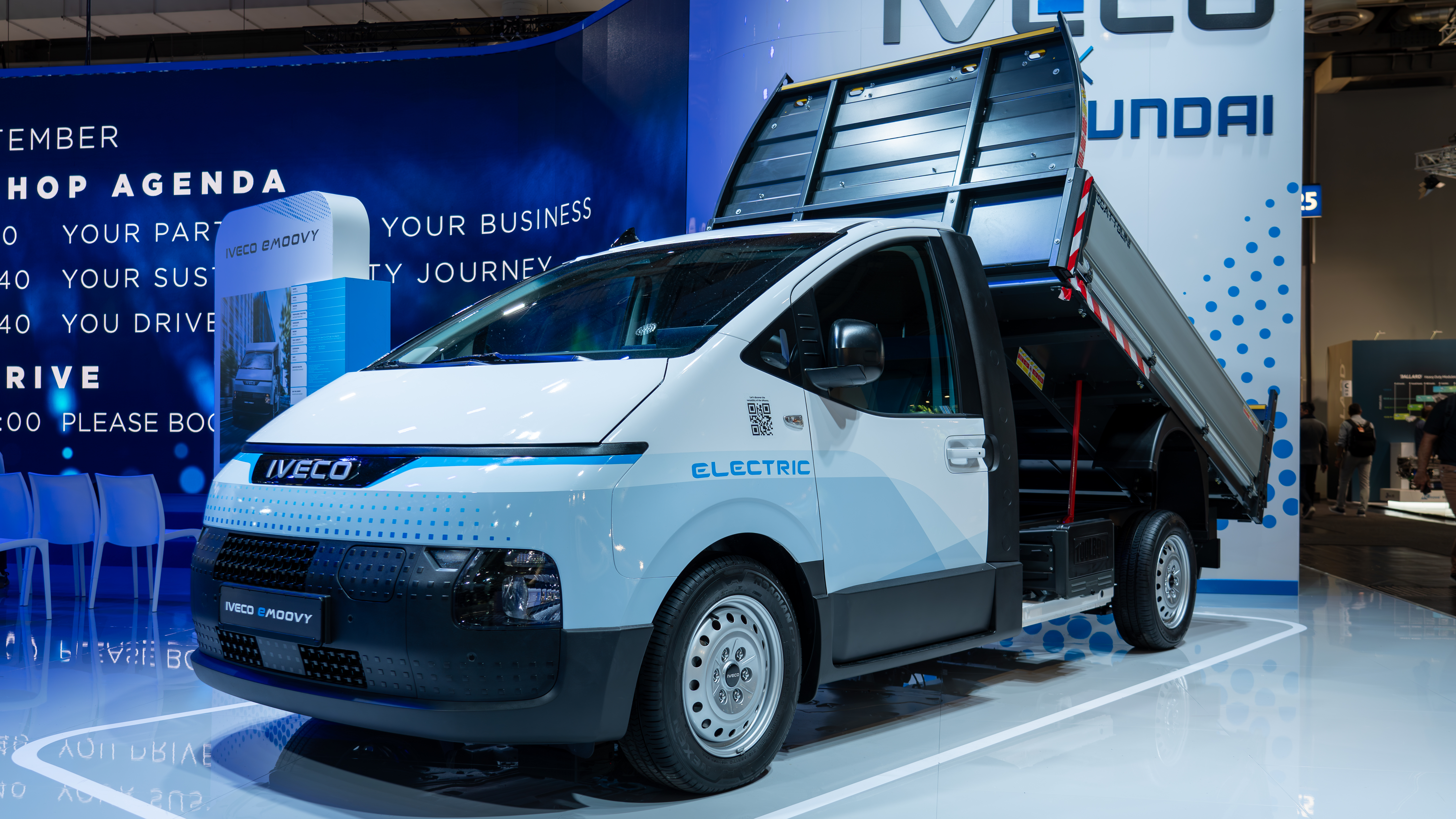
Iveco eMoovy
