= Kia Cub =

Kia concept vehicle

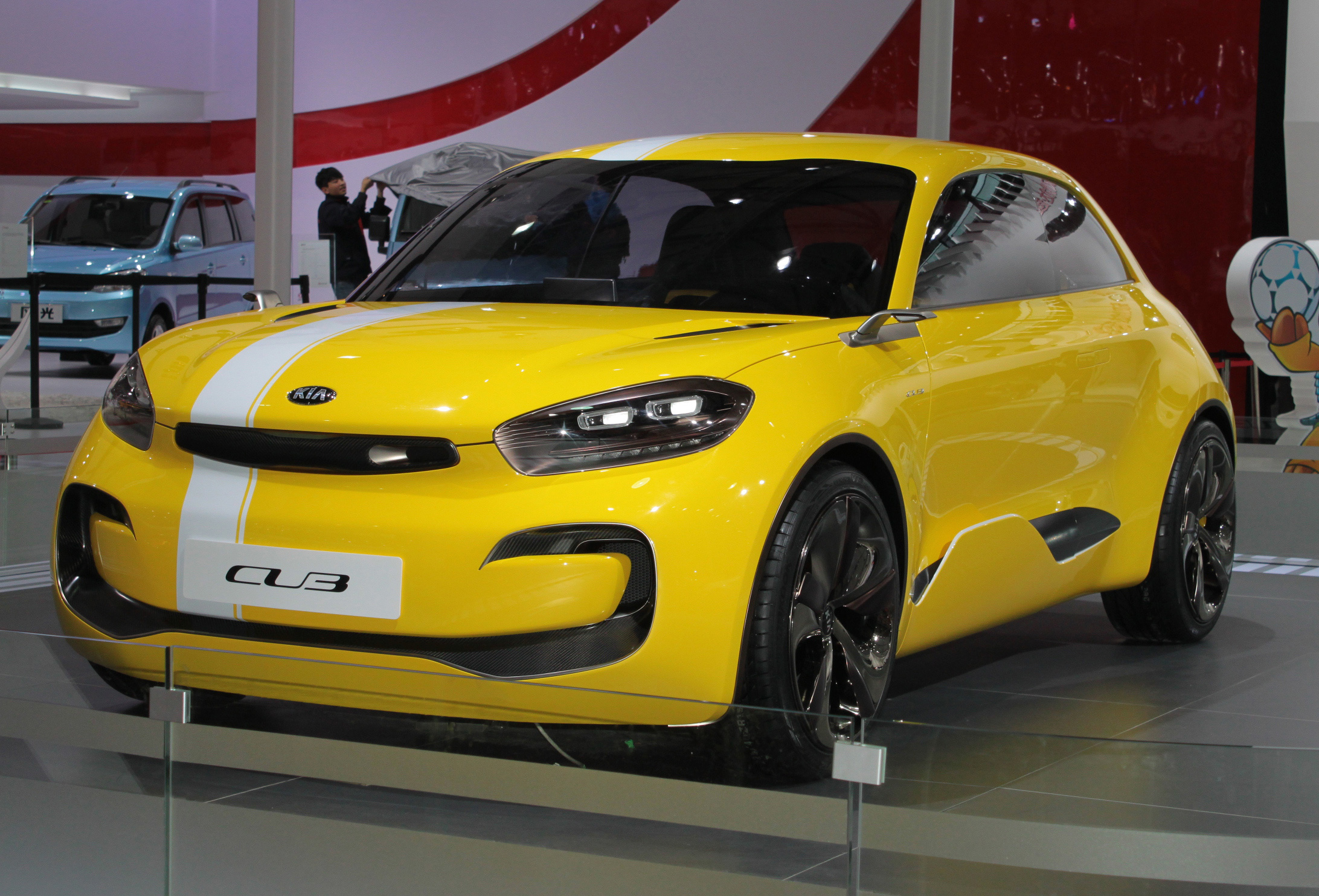
- 2013 Kia Cub at Auto Shanghai (front)

Overview
- Manufacturer: Kia Motors
- Production: 2013
- Designer: Peter Schreyer

Body and chassis
- Class: Subcompact car (B)
- Body style: 5-door hatchback
- Layout: Front-engine, four-wheel drive (F4)

Powertrain
- Engine: 1.6 L Gamma turbo GDI I4
- Transmission: 6-speed manual

The Kia Cub (stylized CUB) is a 5-door subcompact hot hatch concept revealed by South Korean automobile manufacturer Kia Motors at the 2013 Seoul Motor Show.

== Overview ==
The Kia Cub concept was revealed at the Seoul Motor Show on April 3, 2013 in Seoul, South Korea. It is a 5-door subcompact hot hatch, similar in size to the Kia Rio. Thomas Oh, Senior Executive Vice President and Chief Operating Officer of Kia Motors, says that the Cub is “styled to appeal to trend-setting urban dwellers".

== Specifications ==
=== Engine ===
The Kia Cub uses a 1.6 L Gamma turbo GDI I4, which is used in the Hyundai Veloster and another Kia concept hot hatch, the Provo, and has an output of 201 hp. The Cub has a 6-speed manual transmission, and has a top speed of 143 mph (230 km/h) paired with a 0-62 mph (100 km/h) acceleration time of 7.7 seconds.

=== Exterior ===
The Cub concept is finished in a bright yellow paint with an asymmetrical white racing stripe up the hood and roof and down the tailgate. Traditional side mirrors are replaced with cameras.

=== Interior ===
The interior of the Cub is black with yellow accents, and has four leather seats.
