= Kia K3 (BL7) =

Subcompact car

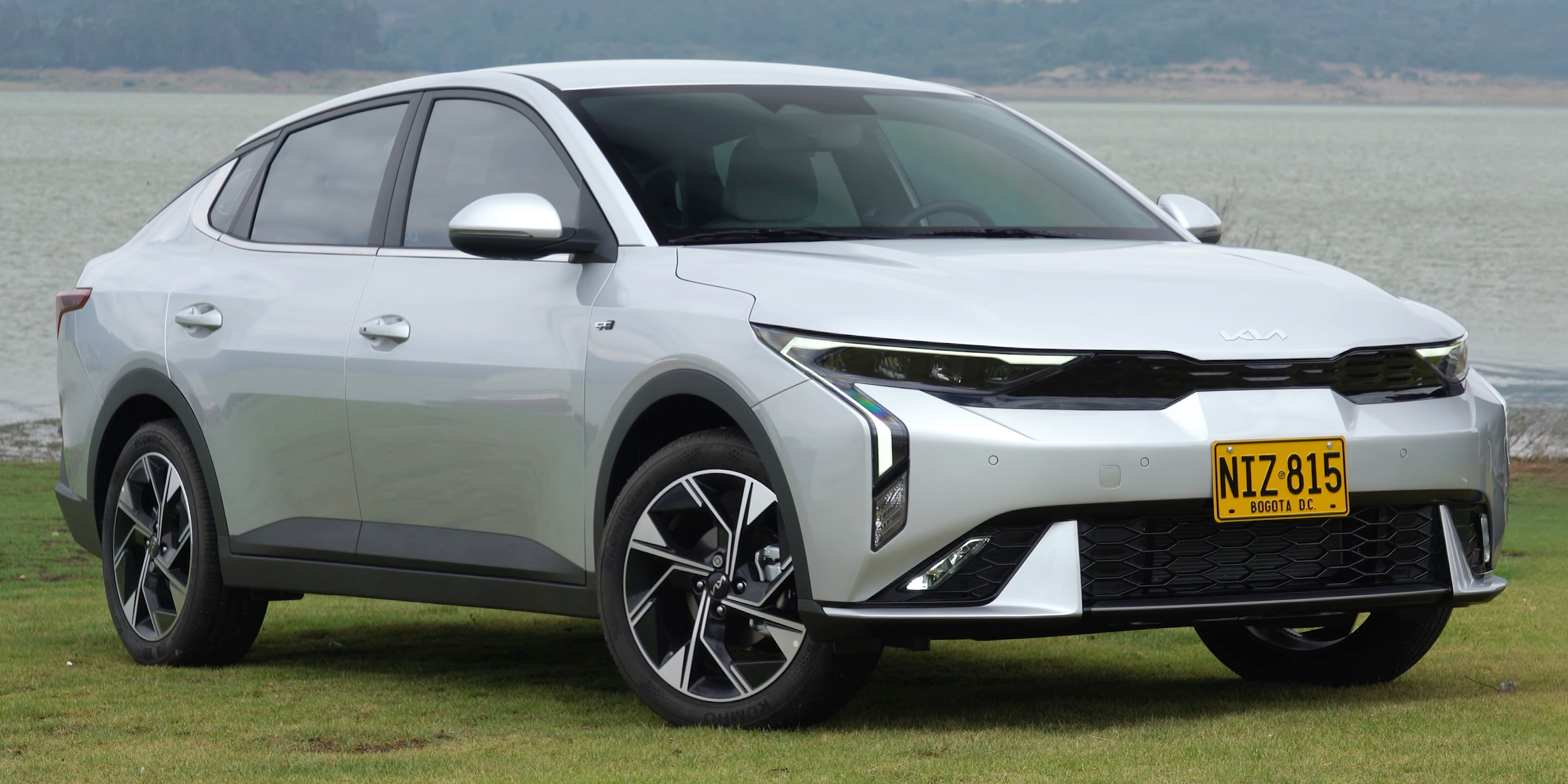
- 2023 Kia K3 GT-Line (Colombia)

Overview
- Manufacturer: Kia
- Model code: BL7
- Production: October 2023 – present
- Model years: 2024–present (Middle East)
- Assembly: Mexico: Pesquería (KMMX); Uzbekistan: Jizzakh (ADM-Jizzakh)

Body and chassis
- Class: Subcompact car (B)
- Body style: 4-door sedan; 5-door hatchback
- Layout: Front-engine, front-wheel-drive
- Related: Hyundai Accent/Verna (BN7)

Powertrain
- Engine: Petrol: 1.4 L Kappa II MPi I4; 1.6 L Smartstream G1.6 MPi I4; 2.0 L Smartstream G2.0 MPi I4
- Transmission: 6-speed manual; 6-speed automatic

Dimensions
- Wheelbase: 2,670 mm (105.1 in)
- Length: 4,295 mm (169.1 in) (hatchback); 4,545 mm (178.9 in) (sedan)
- Width: 1,765 mm (69.5 in)
- Height: 1,495 mm (58.9 in) (hatchback); 1,475 mm (58.1 in) (sedan)

Chronology
- Predecessor: Kia Rio

The Kia K3 is a subcompact car (B-segment) manufactured by Kia since 2023 as a successor to the Rio. Developed under the codename BL7, the K3 is available in hatchback and sedan body styles. The K3 nameplate was previously used by the Chinese and South Korean market Forte/Cerato, which was succeeded by the K4 in 2024 as Kia is realigning their passenger car nomenclature.

== Overview ==
The K3 was first teased on 4 August 2023, and was revealed on 8 August 2023 in Mexico. The hatchback version was announced on 5 October 2023.

The model is offered with a 1.6-liter naturally aspirated Smartstream G1.6 petrol engine that makes 123 PS (121 hp; 90 kW) and 154 N⋅m (15.7 kg⋅m; 114 lb⋅ft) of torque and a 2.0-liter naturally aspirated Smartstream G2.0 petrol engine that makes 152 PS (150 hp; 112 kW) and 192 N⋅m (19.6 kg⋅m; 142 lb⋅ft) of torque. The 1.4-liter Kappa engine from the fourth-generation Rio will be retained, albeit for some export markets.

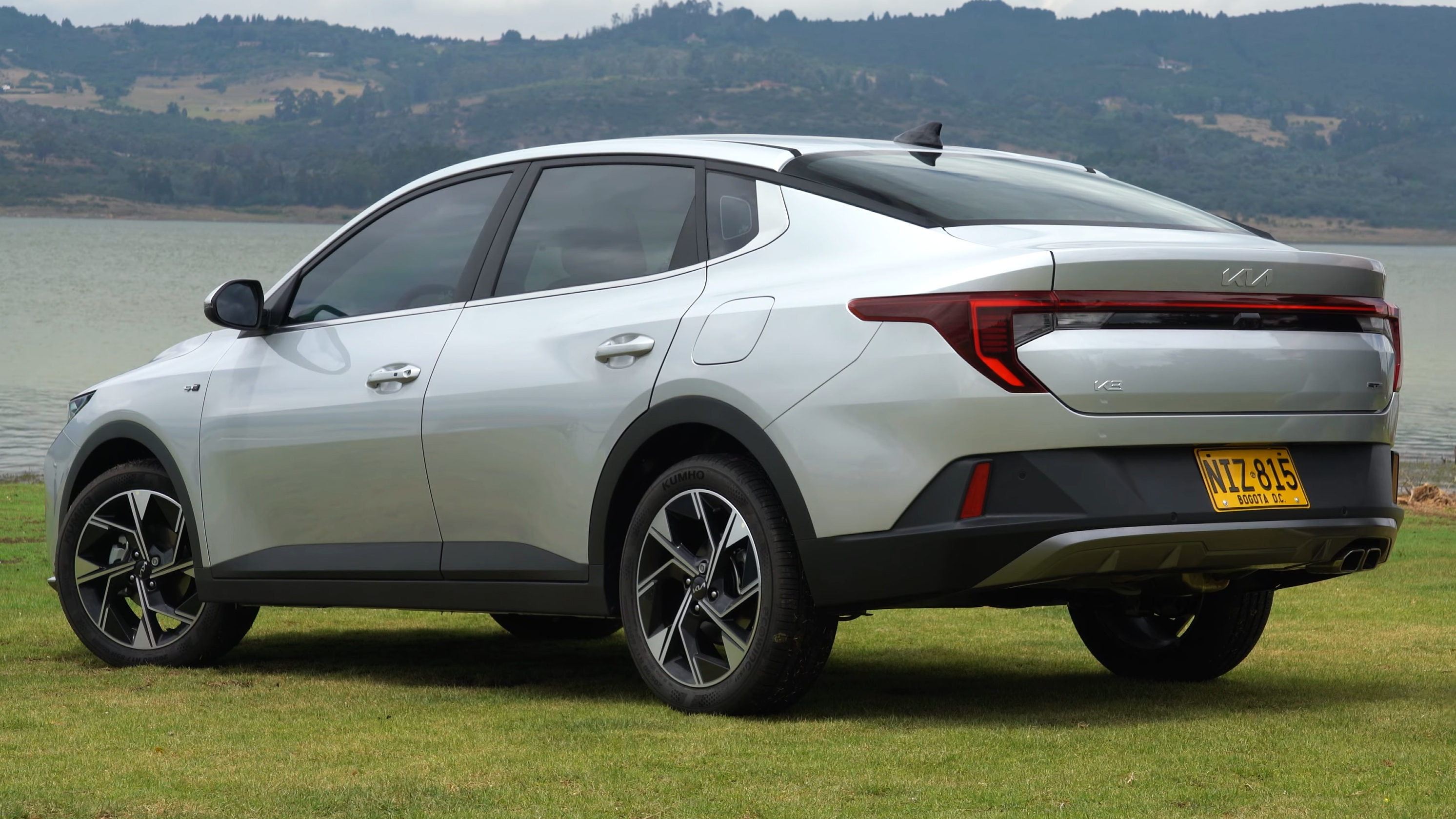
Rear view (sedan)

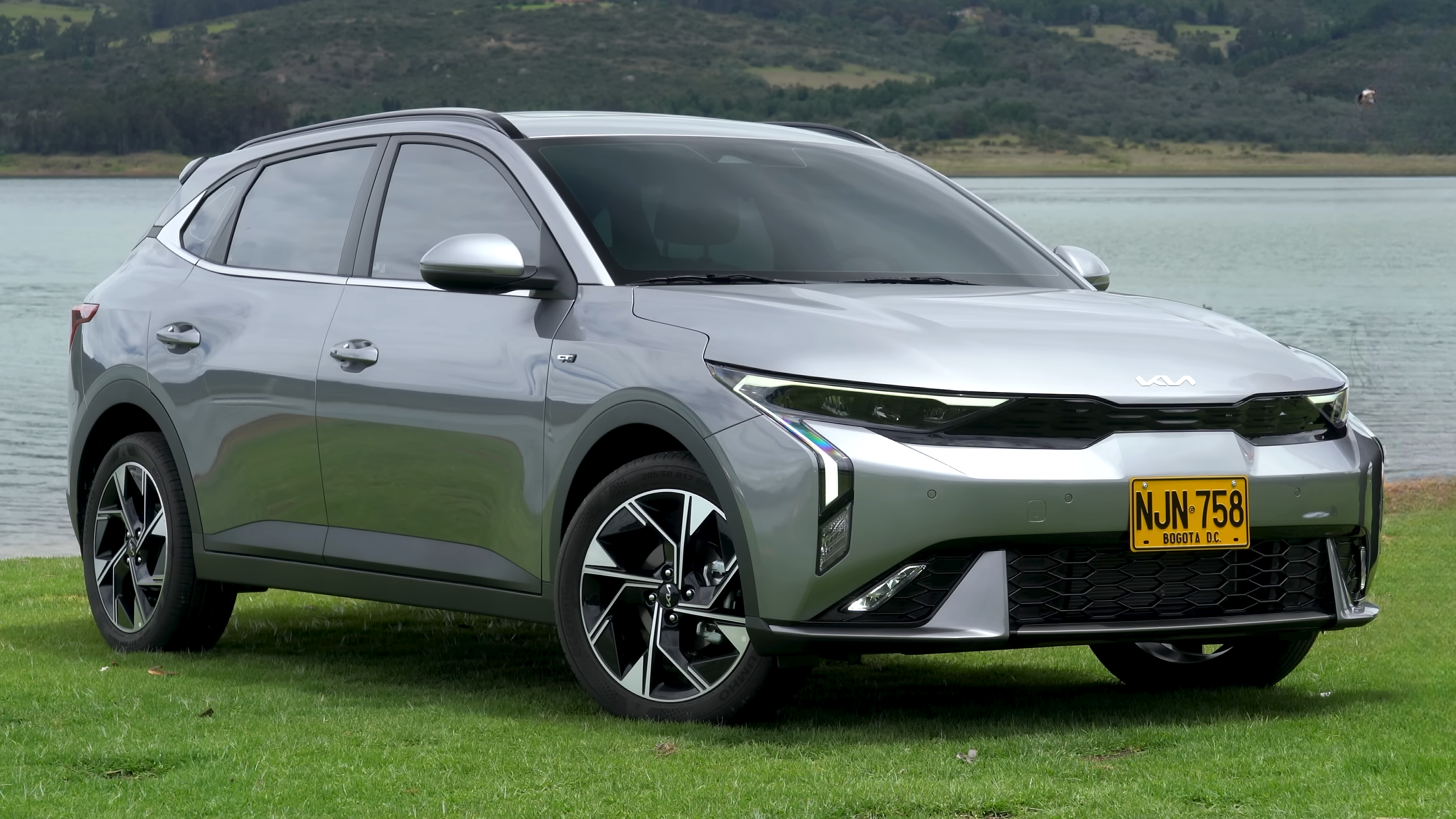
Kia K3 hatchback

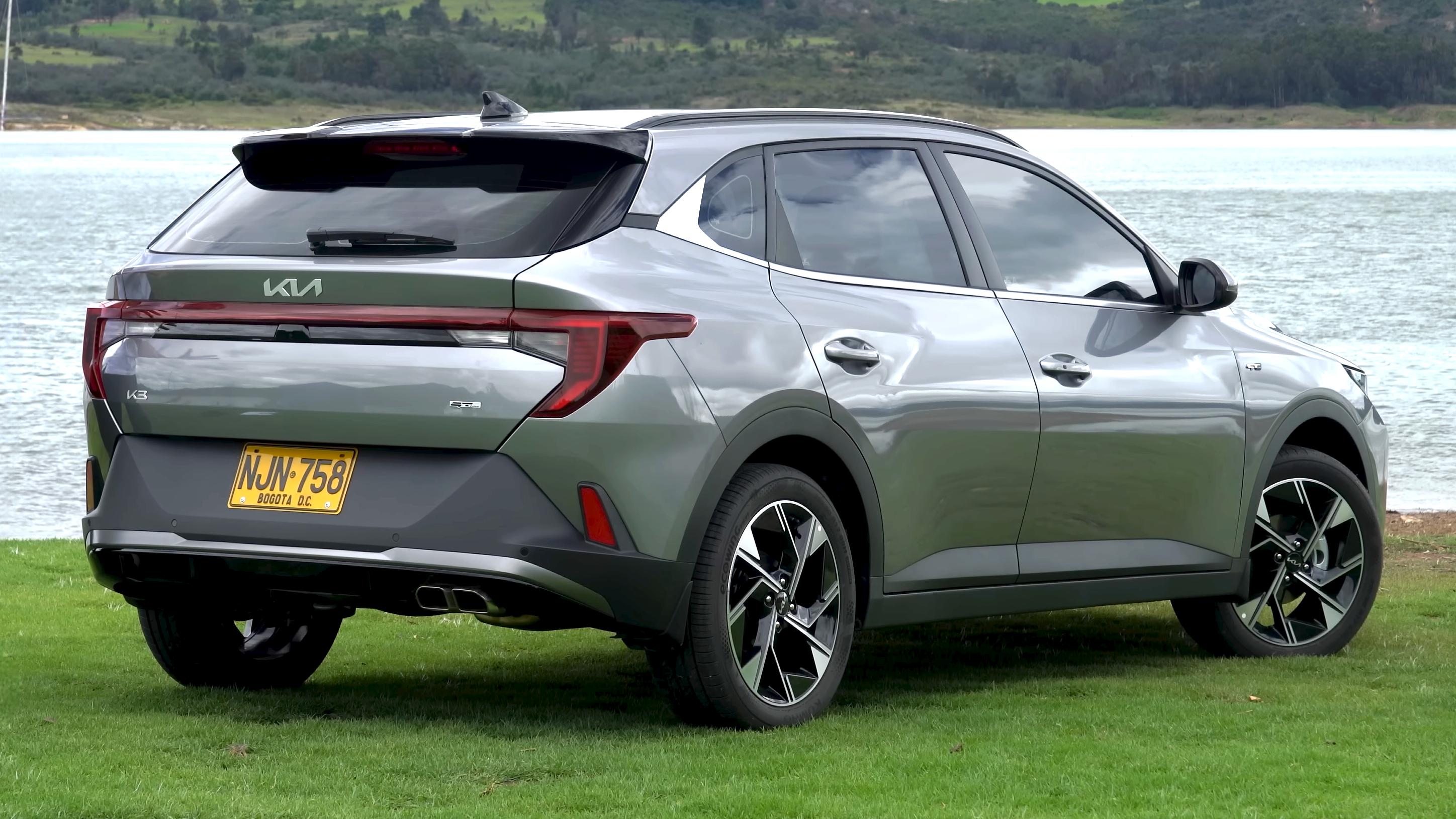
Rear view (hatchback)

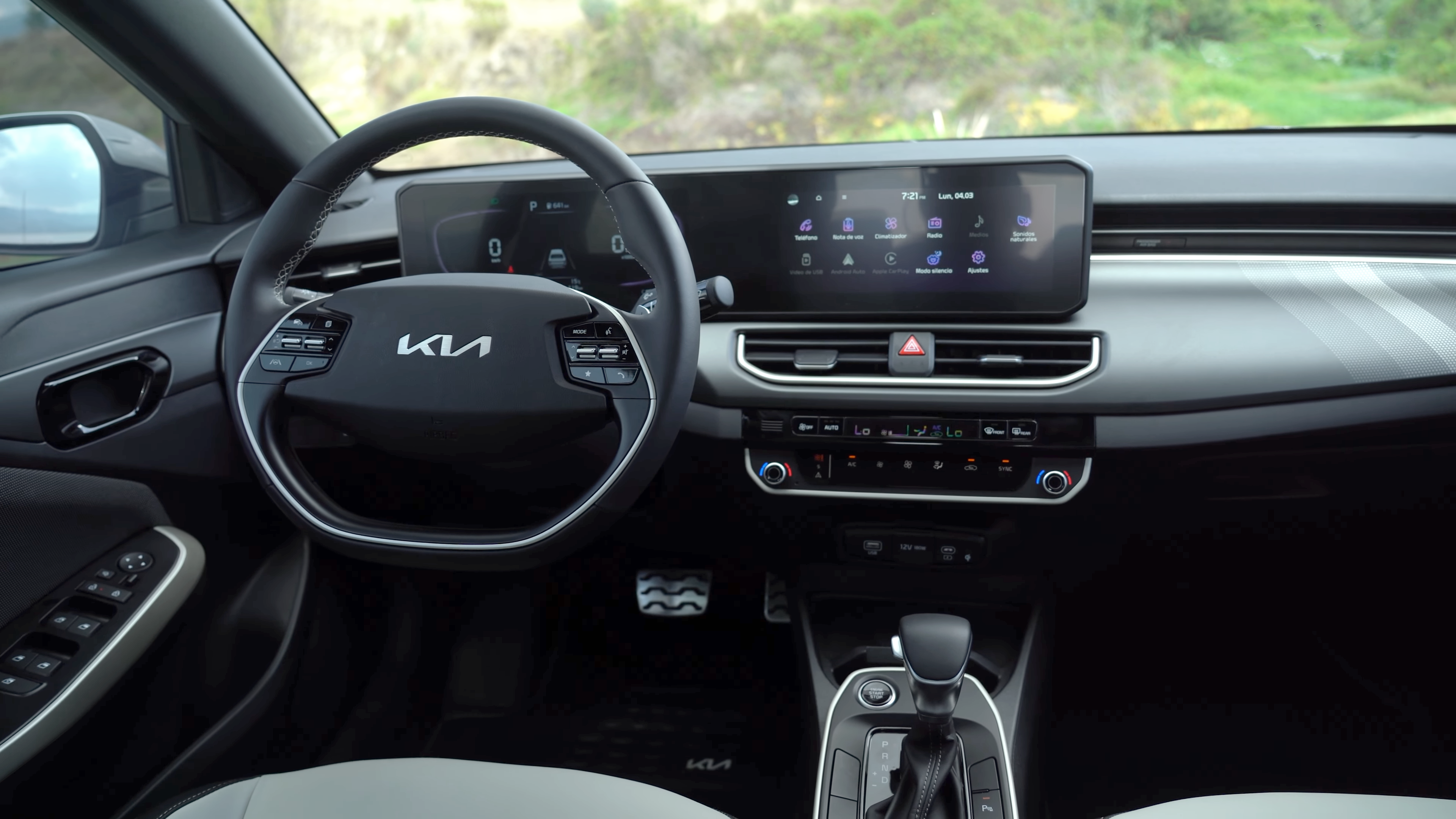
Interior

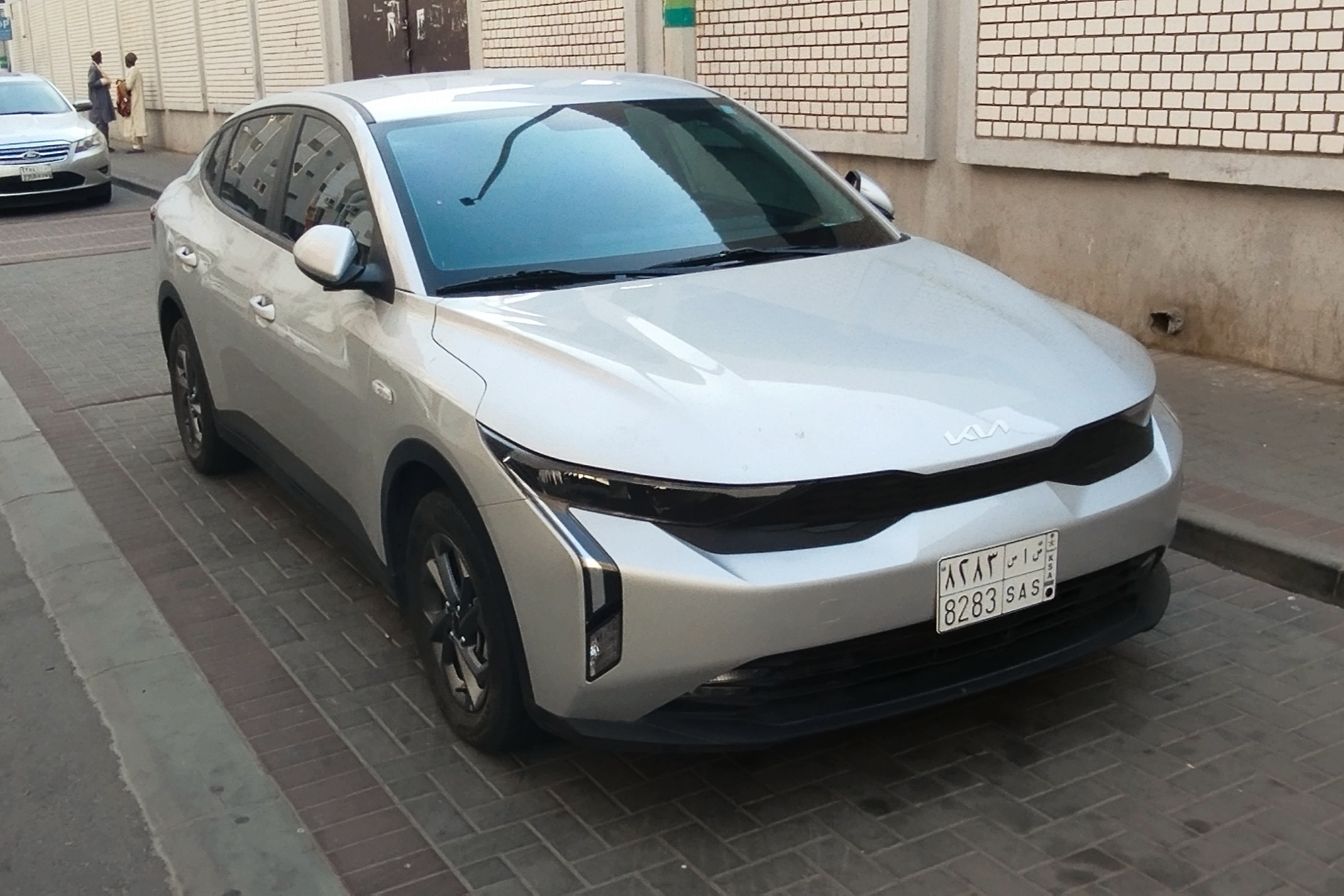
Kia K3 LX sedan (Saudi Arabia)

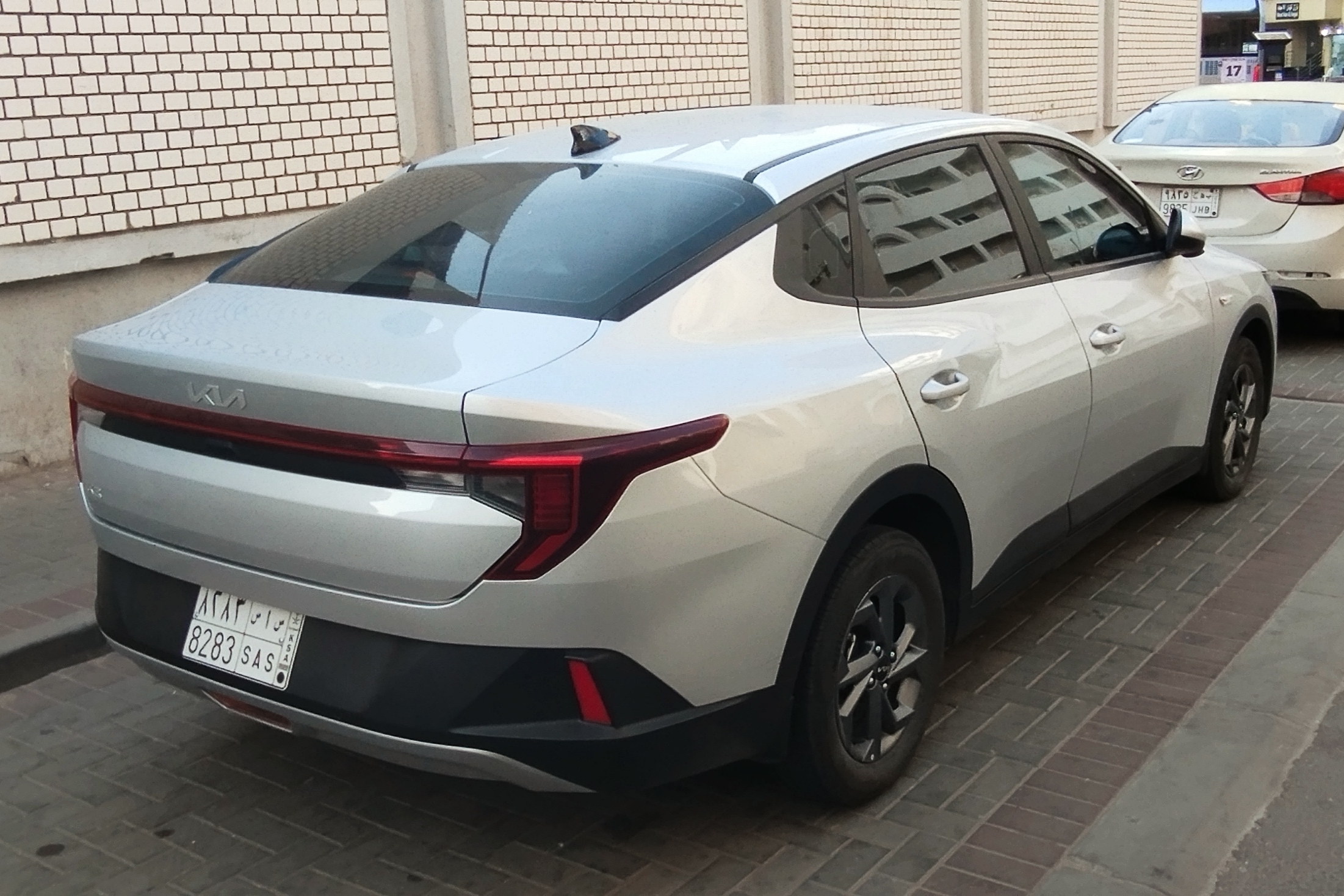
Kia K3 LX sedan (Saudi Arabia)

== Safety ==
Latin NCAP 3.5 test results Kia K3/K3 Sedan - K3 Hatchback/K3 Cross (2024, similar to Euro NCAP 2017)
Test	Points	%
Overall:	5 /5 stars	
Adult occupant:	34.83	87%
Child occupant:	41.00	84%
Pedestrian:	31.42	65%
Safety assist:	34.76	81%

== Markets ==
=== Mexico ===
In the Mexican market, the K3 is available in five variants; L, LX, EX, EX PACK and GT-Line.

=== Middle East ===
The K3 was launched in the GCC markets on 5 December 2023.

=== Latin America ===
The K3 was launched in some Latin American countries as the K3 Cross in 2024.

== Powertrain ==
Model	Years	Transmission	Power	Torque
Petrol
Kappa II 1.4L MPi	2023–present	6-speed manual	95 PS (70 kW; 94 hp) at 6,000 rpm	13.2 kg⋅m (129 N⋅m; 95 lbf⋅ft) at 4,000 rpm
Smartstream G1.6 MPi	2023–present	6-speed manual 6-speed automatic	123 PS (90 kW; 121 hp) at 6,300 rpm	15.7 kg⋅m (154 N⋅m; 114 lbf⋅ft) at 4,500 rpm
Smartstream G2.0 MPi	2023–present	6-speed automatic	152 PS (112 kW; 150 hp) at 6,200 rpm	19.6 kg⋅m (192 N⋅m; 142 lbf⋅ft) at 4,000 rpm

== Sales ==
Year	Mexico	
Year	Sedan	Hatchback
2023	7,743	
2024	40,716	10,913
2025	46,551	10,024
