= Kia Provo =

Kia concept vehicle

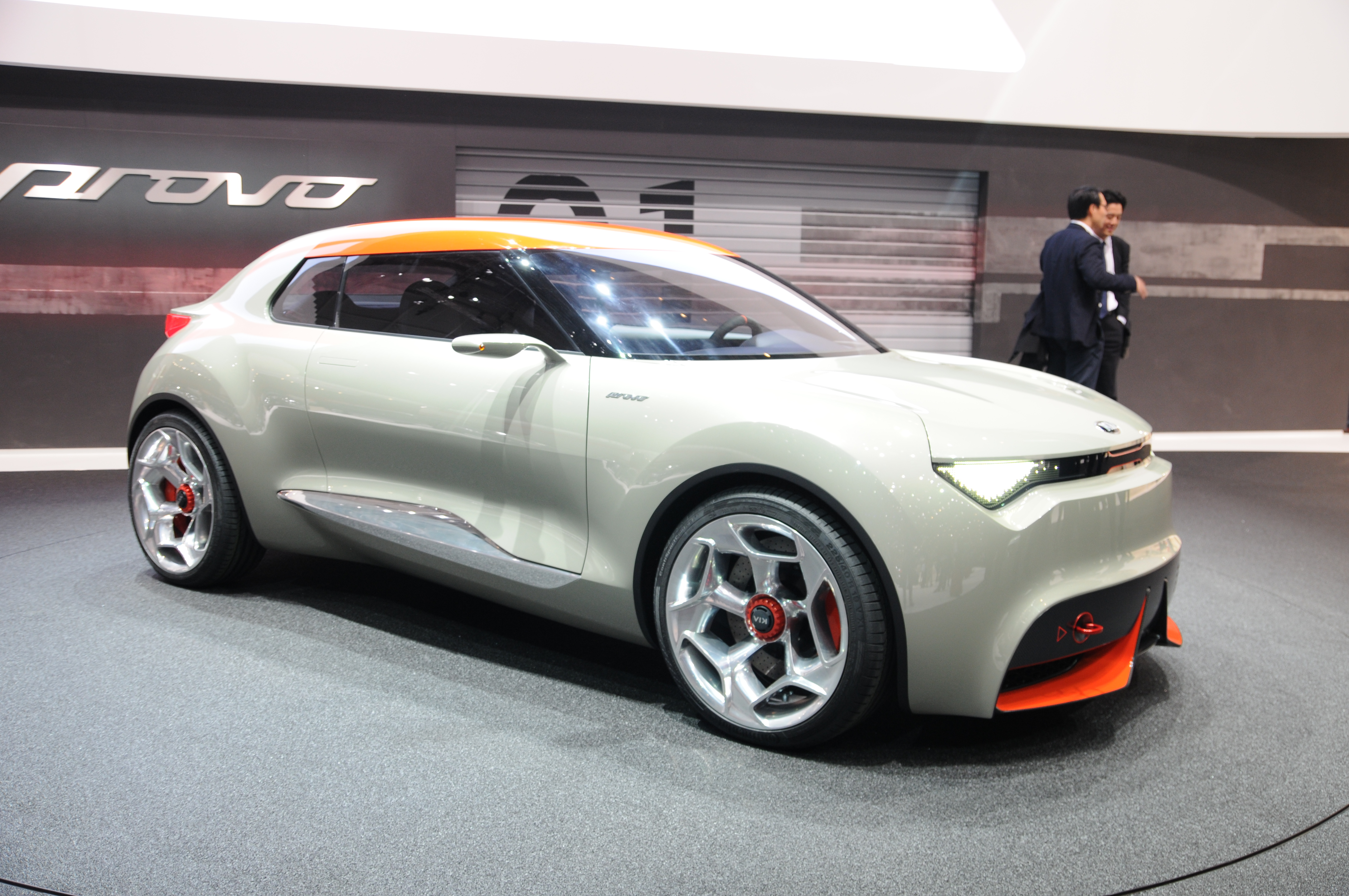
- 2013 Kia Provo at the Geneva Motor Show (front)

Overview
- Manufacturer: Kia
- Production: 2013
- Designer: Gregory Guillame

Body and chassis
- Class: Subcompact car (B)
- Body style: 3-door hatchback
- Layout: Front-engine, four-wheel drive (F4)

Powertrain
- Engine: 1.6 L Gamma turbo GDI I4
- Transmission: 7-speed dual-clutch

Dimensions
- Wheelbase: 2,529 mm (99.6 in)
- Length: 3,881 mm (152.8 in)
- Width: 1,767 mm (69.6 in)
- Height: 1,248 mm (49.1 in)

The Kia Provo is a 3-door subcompact hatchback concept revealed by South Korean automobile manufacturer Kia at the 2013 Geneva Motor Show.

== Name ==
Some media outlets, such as Car and Driver and Motor Trend, speculated that the Kia Provo might be named after the city of Provo, Utah, as Hyundai-Kia has previously named other vehicles after places in the western United States, such as with the Hyundai Tucson and Santa Fe and Kia Sedona, however it is unconfirmed what the name actually means. Nonetheless, the name was actually controversial in the United Kingdom and heavily negatively received by Gregory Campbell, a Member of Parliament for East Londonderry, as "provo" was a term used to refer to members of the Provisional Irish Republican Army, who killed nearly 2,000 people throughout Northern Ireland, England, and some places in Europe. In the House of Commons, Campbell called for the vehicle to never be sold in Northern Ireland or England if brought to production. Ward's Auto noted the orange roof, explaining that the color was associated with Irish unionists and part of Ireland's flag.

== Overview ==
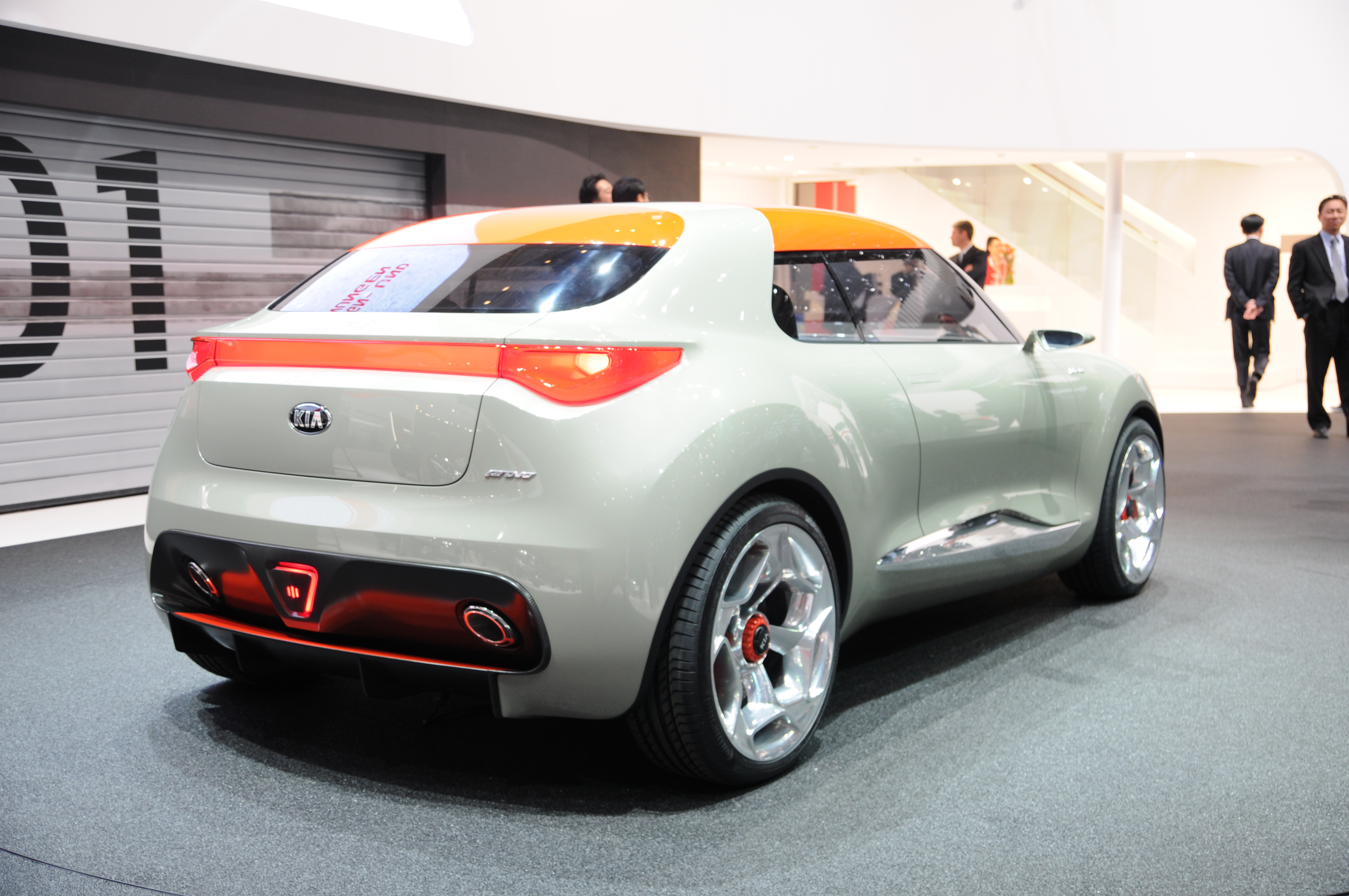
2013 Kia Provo at the Geneva Motor Show (rear)

The Kia Provo concept was revealed at the Geneva Motor Show on March 7, 2013 in Geneva, Switzerland, first teased back in January on Kia's UK website. It is an all-wheel drive crossover-styled 3-door subcompact hatchback, described by Kia as all about "fun—pure and simple". The Provo was designed in Frankfurt, Germany, specifically for the European car market. Gregory Guillaume, chief designer of Kia Europe, says that the Provo concept is "aimed at delivering pure fun and performance for today's city-based enthusiast driver."

== Specifications ==
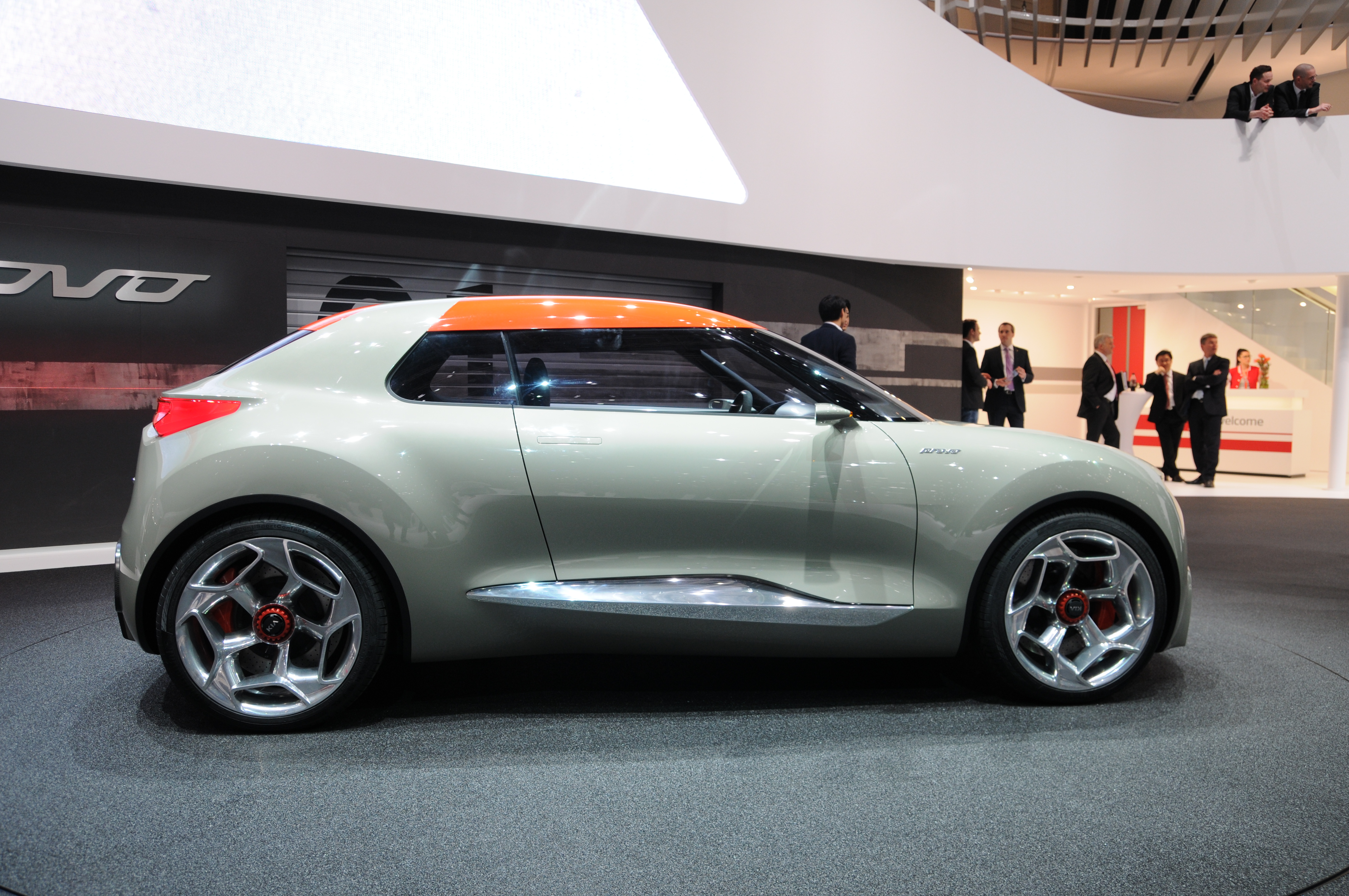
2013 Kia Provo at the Geneva Motor Show (side)

=== Technical specs ===
The Kia Provo is powered by a 1.6 L Gamma turbo GDI I4, which is used in the Hyundai Veloster Turbo and has an output of 201 hp, in the front wheels; and a mild hybrid system powering the rear wheels, providing an extra 44 hp and a total of 245 hp and forming a four-wheel drive powertrain. For the transmission, the Provo uses a 7-speed dual-clutch transmission.

=== Exterior ===
The concept is finished in Kia's "Storm Metal" greenish-gray paint with a deep orange roof and other accents and has large 19-inch wheels. The doors of car feature pop-out door handles. The roof shape and accent color would later appear on the Kia Stonic production vehicle.

=== Interior ===
The designer, Gregory Guillame, described the interior of the Provo concept as “very, very black”. The wave-shaped front bench seat has quilted leather upholstery and adjustable backrests for easier access to the rear seats. The steering column and pedal box are also adjustable since the front seat is fixed in place.
