= Hyundai i-oniq =

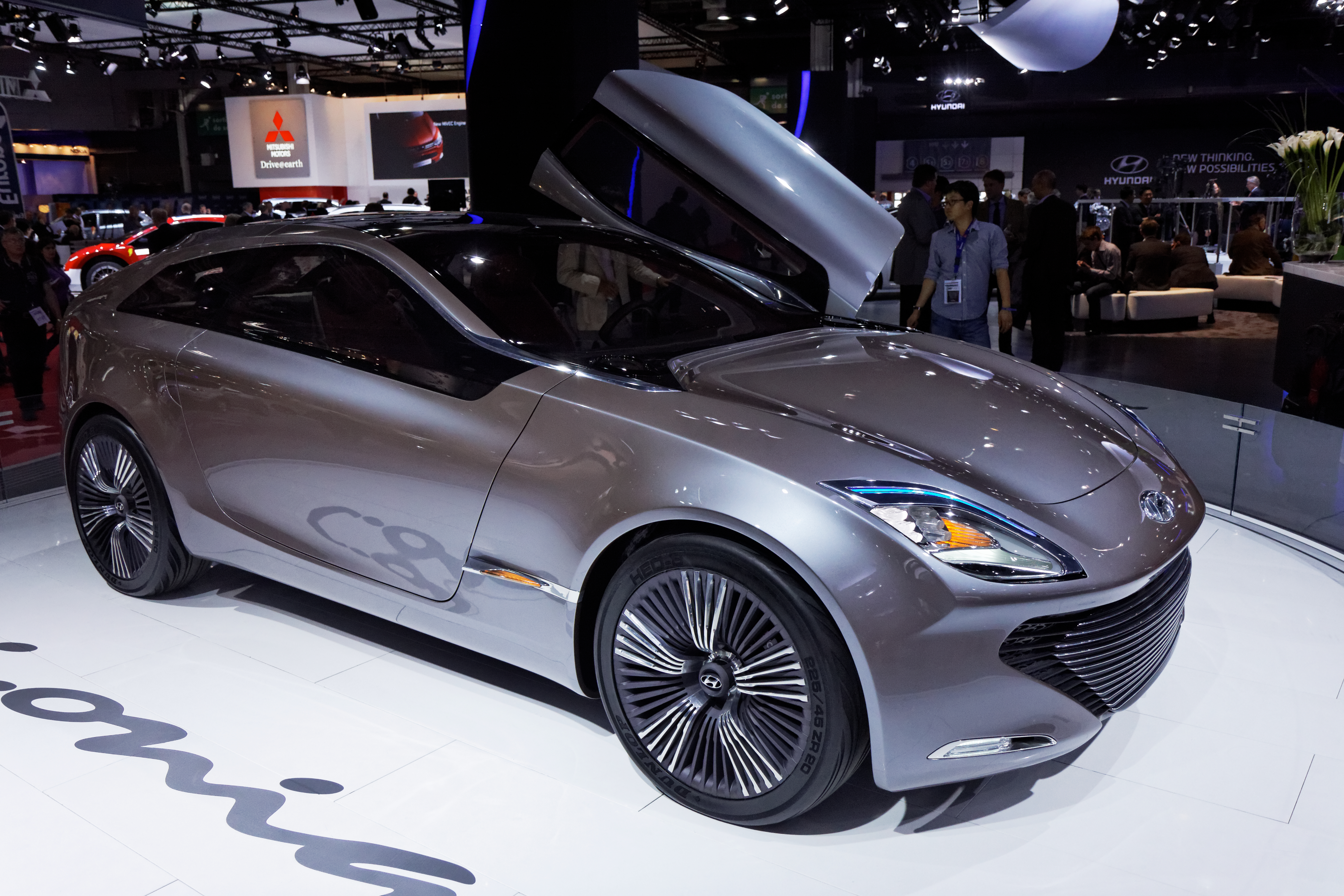
- i-oniq concept at Mondial de l'Automobile (Paris 2012)

Overview
- Manufacturer: Hyundai Motor Corporation

Powertrain
- Engine: 1.0 litre, 3-cylinder (45 kW)
- Electric motor: 80 kW (110 PS; 110 hp)
- Range: 120 km (75 mi) (electric); 700 km (430 mi) (with range extender)

Dimensions
- Wheelbase: 2,650 mm (104.3 in)
- Length: 4,432 mm (174.5 in)
- Width: 1,916 mm (75.4 in)
- Height: 1,400 mm (55.1 in)

Chronology
- Successor: Hyundai Ioniq

The Hyundai i-oniq (also known as the i.oniq and HED-8) was a concept sporty three-door hatchback designed and built by Hyundai Motor Corporation that featured a battery electric powertrain supplemented by a range extending gasoline engine, introduced in March 2012 at the Geneva Motor Show. Its name is a portmanteau of the words "ion" and "unique", which was later reused in 2016 when Hyundai began selling the Hyundai Ioniq. Hyundai subsequently launched the sub-brand Ioniq in 2020 to market electric vehicles built on the E-GMP architecture.

== Design ==
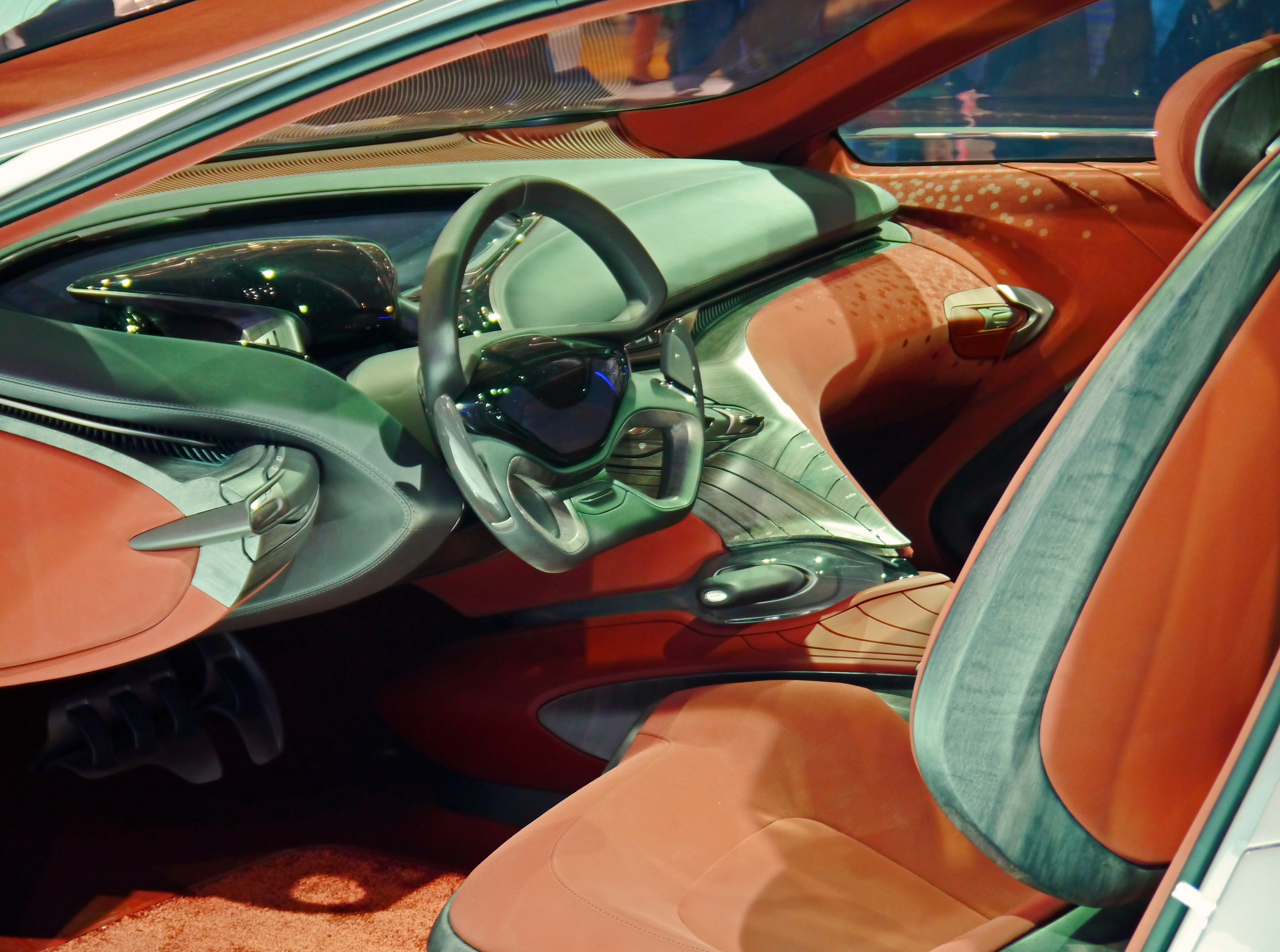
Hyundai i-oniq concept interior

Hyundai state the i-oniq follows the "fluidic sculpture" design language introduced in 2010 with the i-flow concept vehicle. It was designed at the Hyundai Motor Europe Technical Centre in Russelsheim, Germany, under the leadership of Thomas Bürkle. The vehicle has an alternative name, HED-8, which derives from its design origin (Hyundai Europe Design); these are analogous to the HCD-nn line of Hyundai concept vehicles designed at the Hyundai California Design (HCD) Studio.

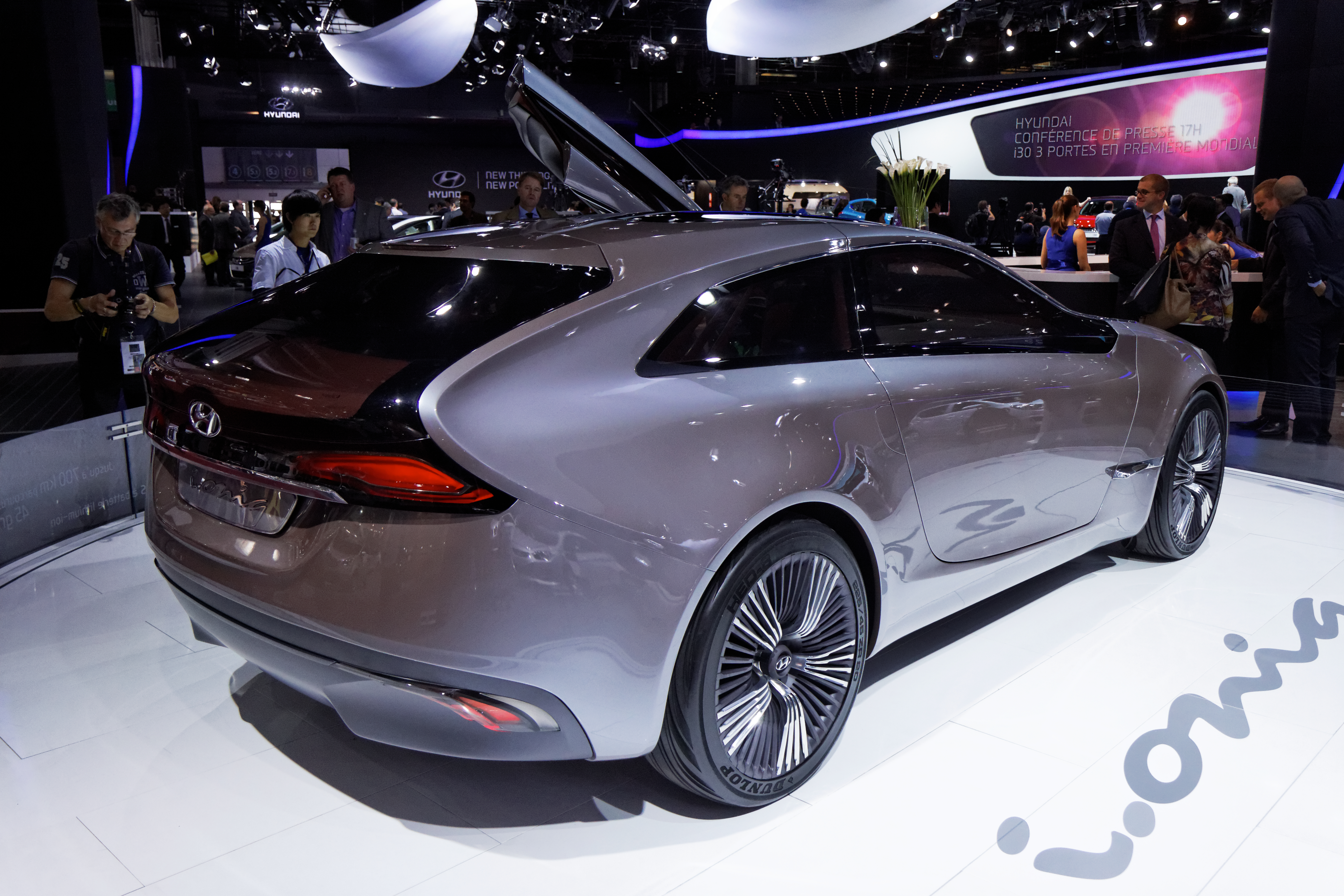
Rear view

The i-oniq concept is equipped with a battery electric powertrain, with a lithium-ion battery supplying power to an 80 kW (110 hp; 110 PS) motor over a claimed range of 120 km (75 mi). When the battery is exhausted, a small, 1.0-litre three-cylinder gasoline engine with an output of 45 kW (60 hp; 61 PS) can be used with a 60 kW (80 hp; 82 PS) generator to supply electricity to the motor, for a total claimed range of 700 km (430 mi). With the range extending engine operating, the vehicle is claimed to emit 45 g/km (2.6 oz/mi) of CO_{2}.

The instrument panel and steering wheel touchscreen displays were designed by MESO Digital Interiors GmbH, using small projectors and Pepper's ghost illusions to provide depth and conform to the complex surface curvature. The seating surface and exterior colors were developed with BASF.
