= Ioniq =

Hyundai Motor Company electric vehicle sub-brand

- Logo of IONIQ since 2016
- Type: Division
- Industry: Automotive
- Founded: 10 August 2020; 6 years ago
- Headquarters: Seoul, South Korea
- Products: Electric vehicles
- Parent: Hyundai Motor Company
- Website: www.hyundai.com/worldwide/ko/brand-journal/ioniq (Korean); www.hyundai.com/worldwide/en/brand-journal/ioniq (English)

IONIQ (stylized in all caps) is an electric car sub-brand and a division of South Korean manufacturer Hyundai Motor Company. It was established in 2020 as part of Hyundai's plan to achieve 1 million electric vehicle sales annually by 2025, with the Ioniq brand projected to contribute 560,000 of those sales.

== History ==
Before it was introduced as a sub-brand, the Ioniq name had been used for the 2012 Hyundai i-oniq concept, a small sporty hatchback that was equipped with a battery-electric drivetrain and a range-extending gasoline engine. Between 2016 and 2022, the name was used for the Hyundai Ioniq, a compact liftback available with a choice of eco-friendly powertrains: gasoline hybrid, plug-in hybrid, or full battery-electric; the 2016 Ioniq was intended to compete with the Toyota Prius hybrid and Nissan Leaf battery-electric vehicles.

On 10 August 2020, the South Korean manufacturer Hyundai Motor Group announced the launching of a new automotive brand called Ioniq (a portmanteau of "ion" and "unique", styled in all-capital letters as "IONIQ") in London, reserved for electric cars. At the launch, the manufacturer revealed its plans to produce electric vehicles named 5, 6 and 7 and based on the Hyundai-Kia E-GMP common electric car platform presented at the 2019 Consumer Electronics Show in Las Vegas.

The first vehicle launched was the Ioniq 5, a crossover utility vehicle that was first sold in 2021. Hyundai is currently expanding its full-electric lineup to include the Ioniq 6, a sedan which debuted in Europe and South Korea in the second half of 2022, and the Ioniq 9 (renamed from its concept - the Ioniq 7), a large SUV which was projected to hit the market in 2024 but was delayed until the first cars were delivered in May of 2025.

== IONIQ in China ==
On 10 April 2026, the Ioniq brand was introduced in China two concepts Venus concept sedan and Earth concept crossover SUV.

== Models ==
Model	Class	Released	Markets	Concept	Notes / Refs.
3	B-segment subcompact car	Apr 2026	Europe	Concept Three; Munich 2025	Sibling vehicles marketed as Kia EV2.
5	C-segment compact crossover SUV	Feb 2021	Global	45 EV Concept; Frankfurt 2019	Sibling vehicles marketed as Kia EV6 and Genesis GV60.
6	D-segment mid-size sedan	Jul 2022	Global	Prophecy; Geneva 2020	Production confirmed for 2022 in an investor presentation.
9	E-segment mid-size crossover SUV	Nov 2024	Global	Seven; Los Angeles 2021	Vehicle with three seating rows, approximately the same size as the Hyundai Palisade. Sibling vehicles to be marketed as Kia EV9 and Genesis GV90.
V	D-segment mid-size sedan	Apr 2026	China	Venus	D-segment sedan produced in China. China's alternative to the Ioniq 6.

The Ioniq 3 subcompact car was released in April 2026 and was previewed by the THREE concept at the 2025 Munich Motor Show in Munich, Germany.

The Ioniq 5 compact crossover SUV was released in February 2021 and was previewed by the Hyundai Concept 45 EV presented at the 2019 Frankfurt Motor Show.

The Ioniq 6 mid-size sedan was released in July 2022 and is foreshadowed by the Hyundai Prophecy concept car, which was scheduled to be presented at the 2020 Geneva International Motor Show but this was canceled due to the COVID-19 pandemic.

The Ioniq 9 mid-size crossover SUV was released in November 2024. Previously known as the Ioniq 7 during development, it is the production model of the Seven concept car, which made its debut at the LA Motor Show in November 2021.

The Ioniq V mid-size sedan was released in April 2026 and was previewed by the Hyundai Venus. It is Hyundai's first Ioniq model that was developed in China.

=== Design ===
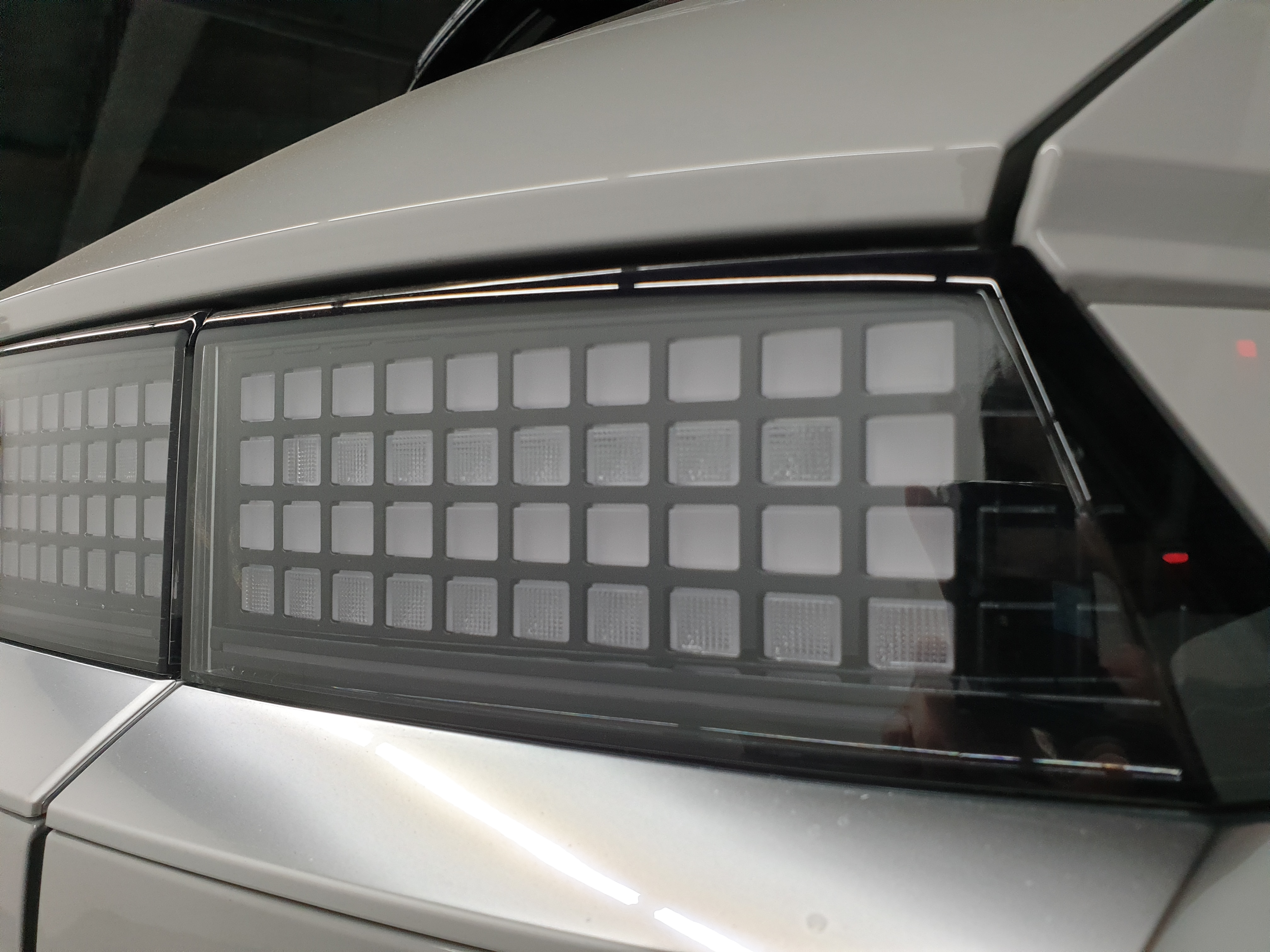
Close-up of Ioniq 5 tail lights, featuring "Parametric Pixel" design.

Under its numeric nomenclature, even numbers are reserved for sedans, while odd numbers are reserved for crossovers and hatchbacks. As a unifying design concept, Hyundai has included "Parametric Pixel" external light designs on each vehicle; these are small square lighting elements which Hyundai characterize as "a unique jewel-like design", reminiscent of 8-bit video game graphics.

In 2022, Hyundai chief of design SangYup Lee clarified there were three "pillars" consistent across the Ioniq brand:

1. Living space-focused interior
2. Parametric Pixel
3. Sustainability and sustainable materials

Because the lineup is designed to embrace "diverse lifestyles ... rather than a one-size-fits-all approach", Lee noted that each model will follow a different theme. The E-GMP platform enables a flat floor inside, giving designers more freedom to personalize the interior for the intended use. For example, the Ioniq 6 has a "mindful cocoon" theme.

=== Heritage Series ===
Hyundai has exhibited several models in its Heritage Series, which are one-off electromod vintage Hyundai vehicles that have been restored and converted with an electric vehicle powertrain; the head- and tail-lights of Heritage Series models share the same "Parametric Pixel" design language as the Ioniq line. Technical details of the powertrains fitted to the Heritage Series vehicles were not disclosed. The Pony Heritage was part of the "Reflections in Motion" exhibition at Hyundai Motorstudio Busan (April 8–27 June 2021) alongside the 45 EV and Prophecy concepts; the pixelated lights of the Pony Heritage were animated, which Hyundai called the "Pixel Roadtrip".

Hyundai Heritage Series models
Model	Released	Based on	Notes / Refs.
Pony Heritage	Apr 2021	Pony (1G), 1975	Exhibited at Hyundai Motorstudio Busan.
Grandeur Heritage	Nov 2021	Grandeur (1G), 1986	Exhibited at Hyundai Motorstudio Goyang and Seoul.
Galloper EV	Cancelled	Galloper (1G), 1991	

== ICCU failures ==
The integrated charging control unit (ICCU) is a component of Hyundai's Electric Global Modular Platform (E-GMP) used by Ioniq vehicles, as well as some Genesis and Kia models. It is responsible for charging the vehicle's 12V battery and powering low-voltage systems, and has been noted for its high failure rate.

On March 15th, 2024, the NHTSA issued a safety recall for certain Hyundai and Genesis vehicles equipped with the ICCU. Because of the component's role in charging the 12V battery, failure of ICCU causes the 12V battery to gradually discharge over time, eventually resulting in complete loss of the vehicle's low voltage systems and motive power. The vehicle will, upon failure, notify the driver through aural and visual warnings on the dashboard and, if in motion, will gradually slow the vehicle until the driver has stopped. The NHTSA issued an additional recall for ICCU failures in November after initial remedies failed to solve the issue.

As of March 2026, Hyundai says that the failure rate is around 1%, but the actual rate may be has high as 10% according to Consumer Reports.

== See also ==
- BMW i
- Honda Ye
- Hyundai EGMP
- Kia EV series
- Toyota bZ
- Mercedes-EQ
- Volkswagen ID. series
