= Hyundai Ioniq 9 =

Battery electric mid-size crossover SUV

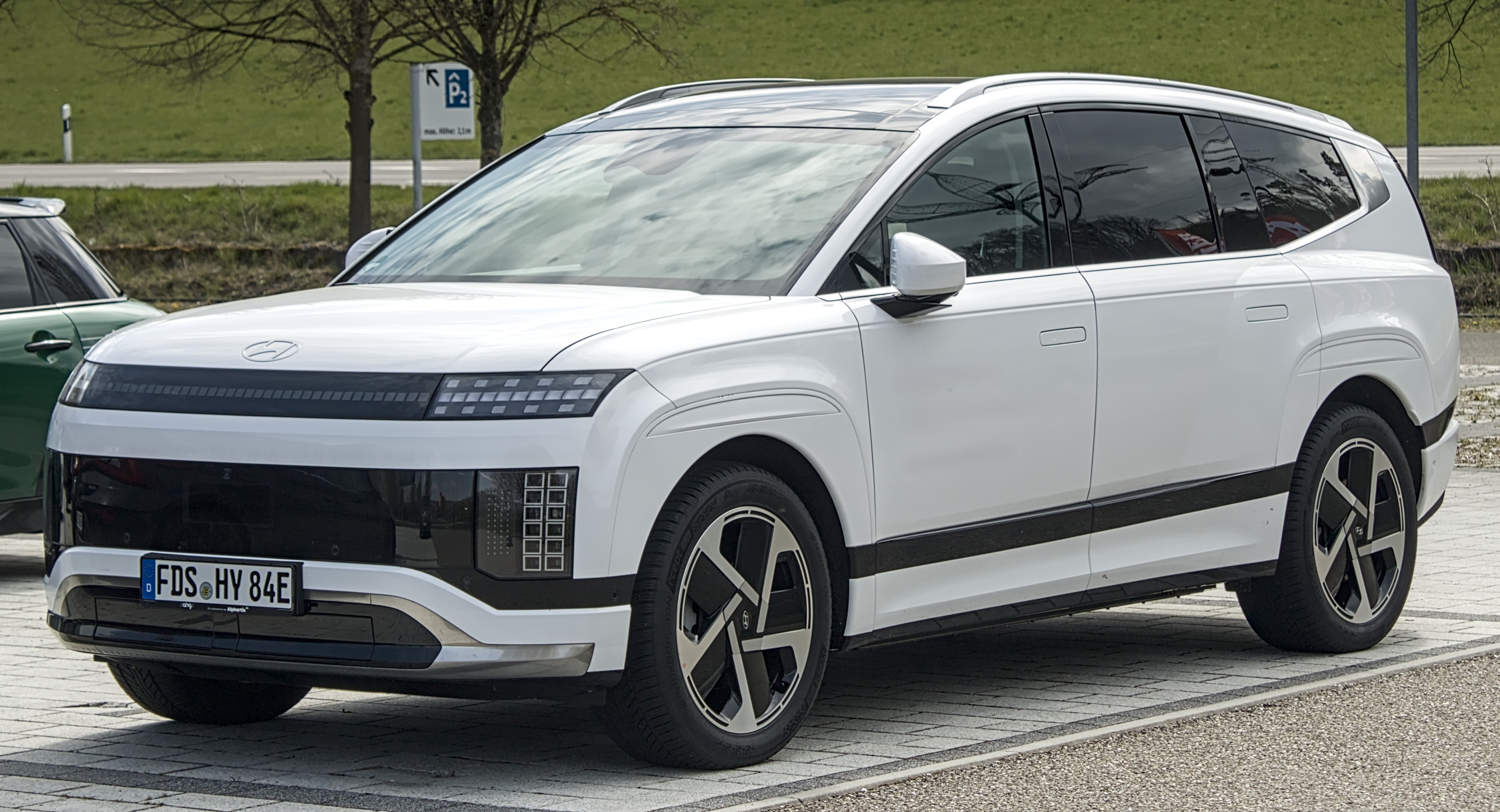
- Hyundai Ioniq 9

Overview
- Manufacturer: Hyundai
- Model code: ME1
- Production: 2025–present
- Model years: 2026–present
- Assembly: South Korea: Asan (Asan Plant); United States: Bryan County, Georgia (HMG Metaplant America)
- Designer: SangYup Lee

Body and chassis
- Class: Mid-size crossover SUV (E)
- Body style: 5-door SUV
- Layout: Rear-motor, rear-wheel-drive; Dual-motor, all-wheel-drive
- Platform: E-GMP
- Related: Hyundai Ioniq 5; Hyundai Ioniq 6; Kia EV6; Kia EV9; Genesis GV60

Powertrain
- Electric motor: Permanent magnet synchronous motors
- Power output: 160 kW (218 PS; 215 hp) (Long Range RWD); 230 kW (313 PS; 308 hp) (Long Range AWD); 320 kW (435 PS; 429 hp) (Performance AWD)
- Battery: 110.3 kWh NCM lithium-ion
- Range: Up to 620 km (385 mi) (WLTP)

Dimensions
- Wheelbase: 3,130 mm (123.2 in)
- Length: 5,060 mm (199.2 in)
- Width: 1,980 mm (78.0 in)
- Height: 1,790 mm (70.5 in)
- Curb weight: 2,505–2,680 kg (5,523–5,908 lb)

The Hyundai Ioniq 9 (Korean: 현대 아이오닉 9) is a battery electric mid-size crossover SUV with three-row seating produced by Hyundai since 2025.

It is the third product to be marketed under the electric cars-focused Ioniq sub-brand, after the Ioniq 5 and Ioniq 6.

It is the largest Hyundai electric SUV in the line-up, acting as a battery electric alternative to the Palisade.

== History ==
=== Concept ===
The Ioniq 9 was first previewed as a concept car called the Hyundai Seven Concept at the 2021 Los Angeles Auto Show in November 2021.

=== Rename ===
Originally, the model was named the Ioniq 7 during its development. At the end of its development program in early 2024, the model was renamed to Ioniq 9.

=== Reveal ===
Months later after the long development of the production model, on 20 November 2024, Hyundai unveiled the Ioniq 9 in Los Angeles, California at the 2024 Los Angeles Auto Show, located from the U.S., and it stays true to the concept model.

== Design ==
Designed under a concept called 'Aerosthetic', the Ioniq 9 incorporates aerodynamically optimized design features, such as a dual-motion active air flap at the front, 3D-shaped underbody cover, and low-resistance tires, achieving a drag coefficient of 0.259 Cd (with digital side mirrors optional in some markets). In the cabin, features a flat floor design and customizable seating options, including six or seven seats with reclinable "Relaxation Seats" in the first and second rows. A Dynamic Body Care system with touch massage functionality and swiveling seats for second-row passengers are among the key interior offerings.

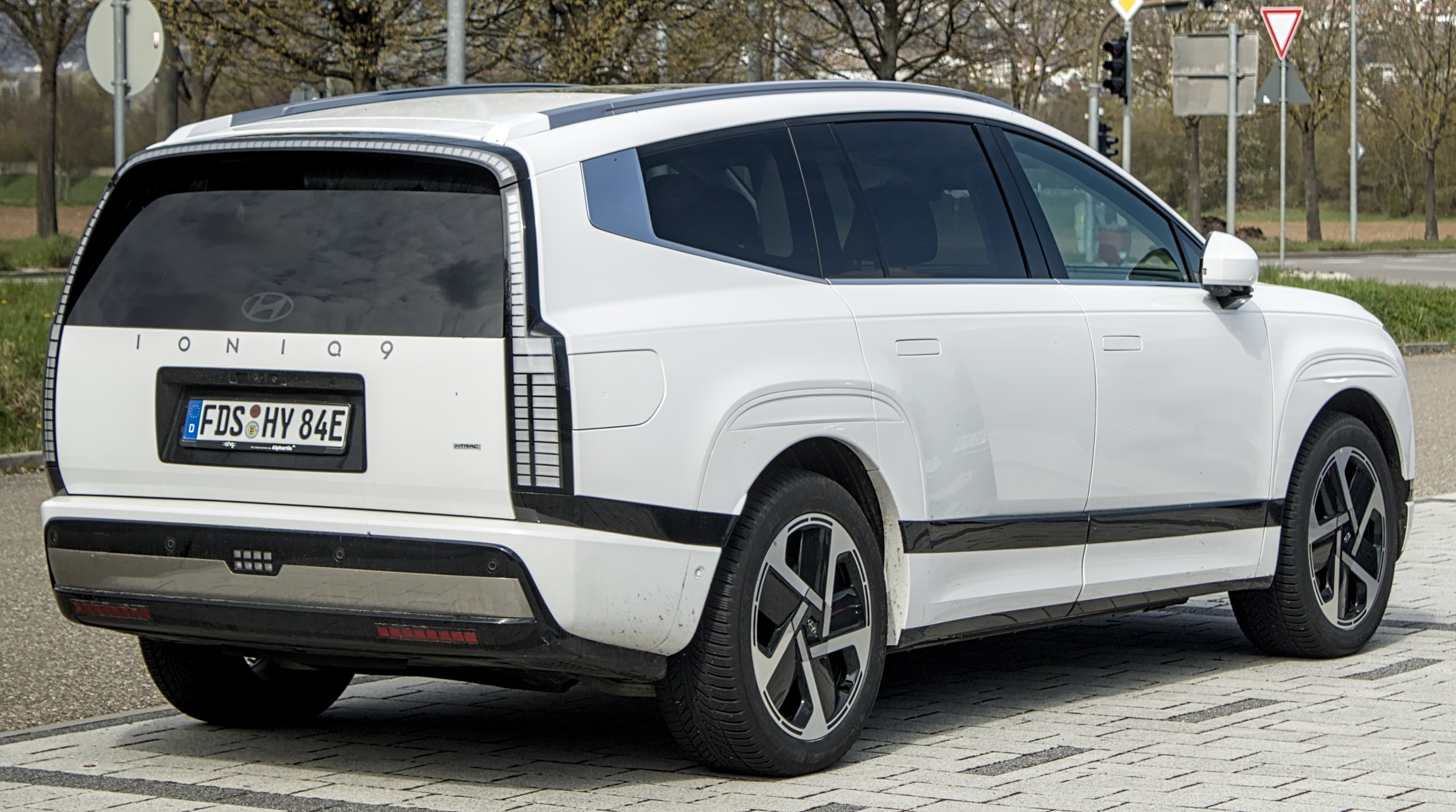
Rear view

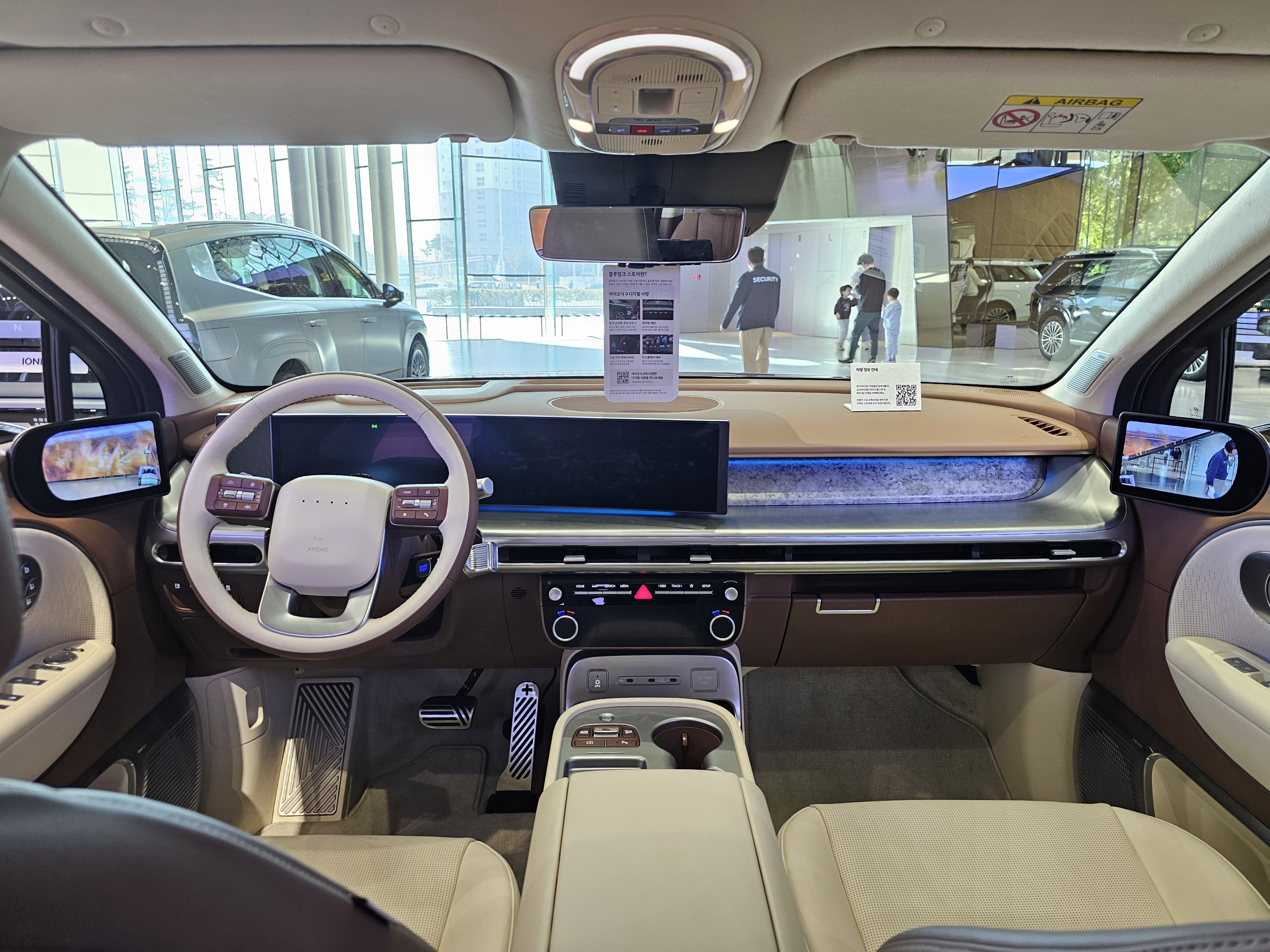
Interior

== Specifications ==
During its introduction, the Ioniq 9 was announced with a single battery size option, an NCM lithium-ion battery with a capacity of 110.3 kWh. The Long Range RWD variant is claimed to have achieved a WLTP-estimated range of 620 km (390 mi). The vehicle supports 400V/800V charging and can charge from 10% to 80% in 24 minutes using a 350 kW charger. Trim levels announced during launch include Long Range RWD, Long Range AWD, and Performance AWD. The latter is claimed to be able to complete a 0–100 km/h (0–62 mph) acceleration test in 5.2 seconds.

== Markets ==
Sales of the Ioniq 9 commenced in South Korea and the United States in the first half of 2025, followed by Europe and other regions.

=== Asia ===
==== Indonesia ====
The Ioniq 9 was launched in Indonesia on 29 July 2026, in the sole AWD variant.

==== Philippines ====
The Ioniq 9 was launched in the Philippines on 23 July 2025, in the sole AWD Calligraphy variant. In the Philippines, the Ioniq 9 was available through the made-to-order scheme and could only be ordered at selected Hyundai showrooms in the country.

==== Singapore ====
The Ioniq 9 was launched in Singapore on 10 December 2025, with three variants: Standard 7-Seater, Calligraphy 7-Seater and Calligraphy 6-Seater.

=== Australia ===
The Ioniq 9 was launched in Australia on 15 July 2025, in the sole Calligraphy AWD variant. In Australia, the Ioniq 9 is available with options such as the 6-seater configuration (includes the second-row Premium Relaxation seats) and digital side mirror cameras. At the time of its introduction, the Ioniq 9 was the most expensive Hyundai vehicle on sale in Australia.

=== North America ===
The Ioniq 9 was released in the North American market in May 2025. For North America, it is available with either RWD, AWD and AWD Performance powertrains.

==== United States ====
Six trim levels are available in the US: S, SE, SEL, Limited, Calligraphy and Calligraphy Design. The vehicle is manufactured at the Hyundai Motor Group Metaplant America.

==== Canada ====
In Canada, the trim levels are: Essential RWD, Preferred AWD, Preferred AWD+, Preferred AWD w/Luxury Package, and Preferred AWD+ w/ Ultimate Calligraphy Package.

== Powertrain ==
Powertrain
Model	Power	Torque	0–100 km/h (0–62 mph) (official)	Range
RWD	160 kW (218 PS; 215 hp)	350 N⋅m (258 lbf⋅ft)	9.4 s	620 km (385 mi) (WLTP); 532 km (331 mi) (South Korea)
AWD	230 kW (313 PS; 308 hp)	605 N⋅m (446 lbf⋅ft)	6.7 s	503 km (313 mi) (South Korea)
AWD Performance	320 kW (435 PS; 429 hp)	700 N⋅m (516 lbf⋅ft)	5.2 s	501 km (311 mi) (South Korea)

== Safety ==
=== Euro NCAP ===
Euro NCAP test results Hyundai Ioniq 9 4x4 GLS (LHD) (2025)
Test	Points	%
Overall:	5 /5 stars	
Adult occupant:	33.9	84%
Child occupant:	43.0	87%
Pedestrian:	49.0	77%
Safety assist:	15.0	83%

=== ANCAP ===
ANCAP test results Hyundai IONIQ 9 (2025, aligned with Euro NCAP)
Test	Points	%
Overall:	5 /5 stars	
Adult occupant:	33.86	84%
Child occupant:	42.57	86%
Pedestrian:	48.99	77%
Safety assist:	15.46	85%

== See also ==
- Ioniq
- List of Hyundai vehicles
- Kia EV9
