= Hyundai Ioniq V =

Mid-size sedan

Overview
- Manufacturer: Hyundai
- Model code: EA1c
- Production: 2026–present
- Assembly: China: Beijing (Beijing Hyundai)

Body and chassis
- Class: Mid-size car (D)
- Body style: 4-door fastback sedan
- Layout: Front-motor, front-wheel drive
- Platform: Electric Global Modular Platform

Powertrain
- Electric motor: 168 kW CF4B PMSM
- Power output: 188–225 hp (140–168 kW; 191–228 PS)
- Battery: 53.5 kWh LFP CATL; 66.8 kWh LFP CATL
- Electric range: 520–650 km (323–404 mi) (CLTC)

Dimensions
- Wheelbase: 2,900 mm (114.2 in)
- Length: 4,900 mm (192.9 in)
- Width: 1,890 mm (74.4 in)
- Height: 1,470 mm (57.9 in)
- Curb weight: 1,707–1,808 kg (3,763–3,986 lb)

The Hyundai Ioniq V (Chinese: 现代艾尼氪V; pinyin: Xiàndài Àiníkè V; pronounced "Vee", not "Five") is a battery electric and range extender mid-size fastback sedan produced by Hyundai Motor Company since 2026.

It is marketed under the battery electric-focused Ioniq sub-brand and developed in China.

The Ioniq V is China's alternative to the Ioniq 6, featuring its fastback look, but with wedged looks of a supercar, contributing to a low drag coefficient of 0.23Cd.

== Overview ==
The Ioniq V was first shown as the Venus concept, which debuted alongside the Earth concept on April 10, 2026.

A couple of weeks later, the production vehicle was introduced on April 24, 2026, at the Beijing Auto Show, as China's first Ioniq model, and it stays true to the concept car.

Pre-sales began on August 21, 2026, on the first day of the 2026 Chengdu Auto Show, with a starting price of ¥119,000 ($17,836) and 3 variants being available. Two single motor powertrains are available producing 140kW and 168kW respectively, matched with 53.48kWh and 66.85kWh battery packs with CLTC pure electric range of 540km and 650km.

The Ioniq V went on sale on 29 September 2026.

Rear view

Interior

The Ioniq V uses MacPherson strut front suspension and torsion beam rear suspension.

=== Design ===
Hyundai describes the design of the Ioniq V to feature a "single-curve silhouette", with a sloping front end, fastback-like rear profile, and crisp lines. Despite this, it features a traditional trunk. It features "Dimensional Light Blade" headlights and "Dimensional Star Track" taillights.

The company's new design language, The Origin, debuts with the Ioniq V. It also uses frameless doors. It has a drag coefficient of 0.23 C_{d}.

=== Features ===
The interior of the Ioniq V uses a 27-inch 4K central touchscreen that stretches to the right of the dashboard, allowing it to also be used by the passenger. A 11.98-inch heads-up display is used in place of a digital instrument cluster. It does not use physical controls and is powered by a Qualcomm Snapdragon 8295P SoC. All models are equipped with a 1.2 m^{2} (12.9 sq ft) panoramic sunroof, and it has a trunk capacity of 465 L (16.4 cu ft).

It has access to an optional Starry Sky Level 2 ADAS system developed with Momenta, which uses a sensor suite consisting of one mmWave radar, 7 cameras and 12 ultrasonic sensors, and is capable of assisted driving on highway roads.

== Specifications ==
Hyundai claims that the Ioniq V will be able to drive 600 km (370 mi) on a single charge based on the China Light-Duty Vehicle Test Cycle. The powertrain is an 800-volt class system. The Ioniq V will also be available as a range-extender in the future.

Specifications
| Battery | | Power | Torque | Range | 30–80% charge | 0–100 km/h (62 mph) | Top speed | Kerb weight |
| Type | Weight | Power | Torque | CLTC | 30–80% charge | 0–100 km/h (62 mph) | Top speed | Kerb weight |
|---|---|---|---|---|---|---|---|---|
| 53.5 kWh LFP CATL | 395 kg (871 lb) | 188 hp (140 kW; 191 PS) | 250 N⋅m (184 lb⋅ft) | 540 km (336 mi) | 20 min | 7.9 s | 165 km/h (103 mph) | 1,707 kg (3,763 lb) |
| 66.8 kWh LFP CATL | 465 kg (1,025 lb) | 225 hp (168 kW; 228 PS) | 250 N⋅m (184 lb⋅ft) | 650 km (404 mi) | 20 min | 7.7 s | 165 km/h (103 mph) | 1,782 kg (3,929 lb) |
