= Genesis GV60 =

Battery electric compact crossover SUV

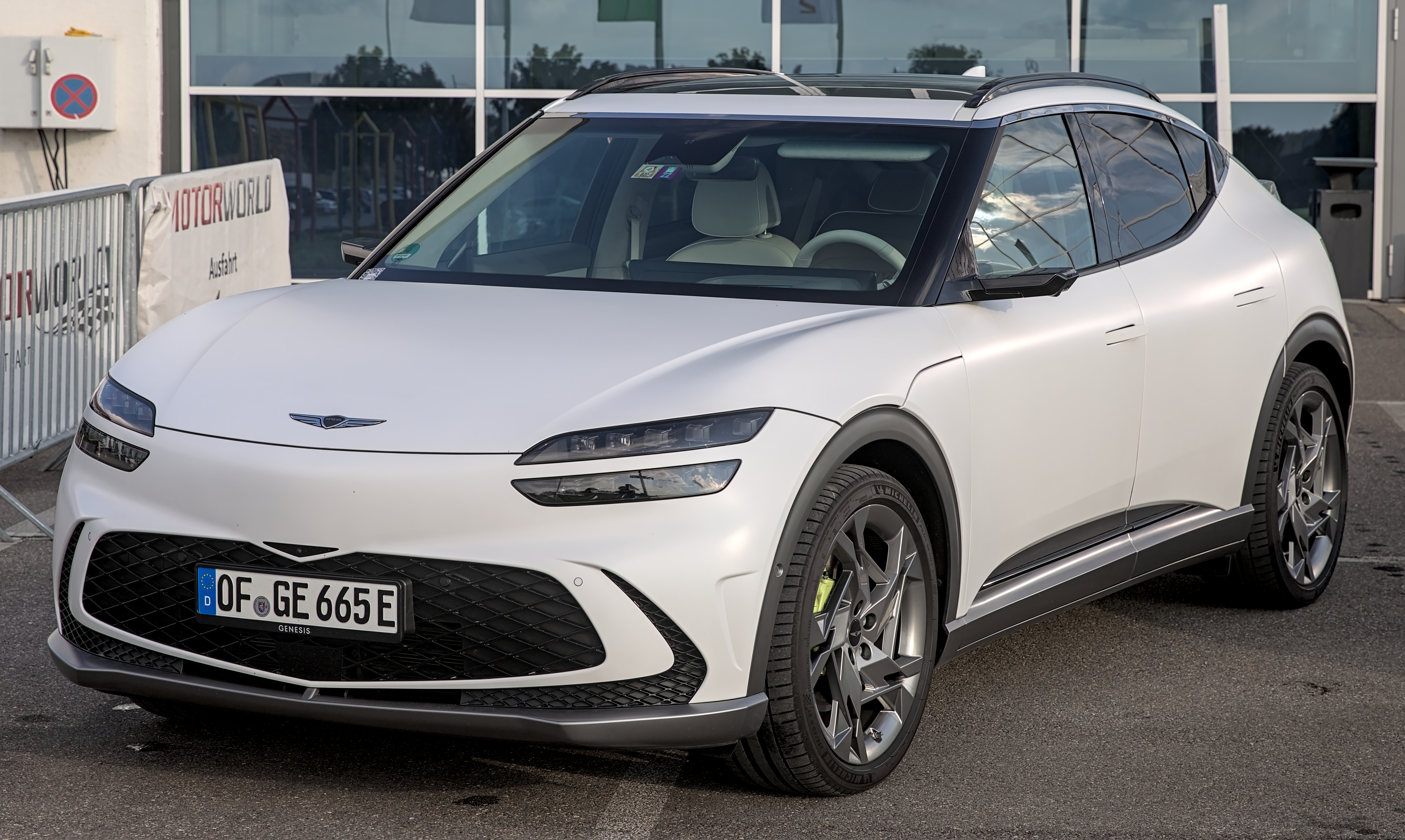

Overview
- Manufacturer: Genesis Motor (Hyundai)
- Model code: JW1
- Production: 2021–present
- Model years: 2023–present (North America)
- Assembly: South Korea: Ulsan (Ulsan Plant)
- Designer: Jung Myung-jin

Body and chassis
- Class: Compact luxury crossover SUV
- Body style: 5-door coupe SUV
- Layout: Rear-motor, rear-wheel-drive; Dual-motor, all-wheel drive
- Platform: Hyundai E-GMP
- Related: Hyundai Ioniq 5; Hyundai Ioniq 6; Hyundai Ioniq 9; Kia EV6; Kia EV9

Powertrain
- Electric motor: Permanent magnet synchronous reluctance motor
- Power output: 168–478 kW (228–650 PS; 225–641 hp)
- Transmission: Single-speed reduction gear
- Battery: 77.4 kWh SK On lithium-ion polymer (NMC); 84 kWh SK On lithium-ion polymer (NMC)
- Electric range: Up to 516 km (321 mi) (WLTP); Up to 294 mi (473 km) (EPA)
- Plug-in charging: 350 kW 800 V V2L: 3.6 kW

Dimensions
- Wheelbase: 2,900 mm (114.2 in)
- Length: 4,515 mm (177.8 in) (Pre-facelift); 4,545 mm (178.9 in) (Facelift)
- Width: 1,890 mm (74.4 in)
- Height: 1,580 mm (62.2 in)
- Curb weight: 1,975–2,190 kg (4,354–4,828 lb)

The Genesis GV60 is a battery electric compact luxury crossover SUV produced by Genesis, a luxury vehicle marque of Hyundai, since 2021.

Slotted below the GV70, it is the first Genesis product to be developed on the Hyundai Electric Global Modular Platform (E-GMP).

It is the third SUV model from the Genesis brand, after the GV80 and GV70.

== Overview ==
Genesis unveiled the GV60 on 19 August 2021; it was released globally on 30 September 2021. Codenamed JW during development, the vehicle sits on a dedicated EV platform shared by the Hyundai Ioniq 5 and the Kia EV6. Powertrain details include a single-motor application for lower trim levels as well as a dual-motor all-wheel-drive model.

The GV60 is the first to apply a new Genesis emblem imprinted with an elaborate guilloche pattern and a clamshell hood that removes joints between the bodies. Also, the GV60 is equipped with Face Connect which recognizes the driver's face to control the door lock, seat, steering wheel, side mirrors, and infotainment. A smartphone-based digital key can be used to open the door of the vehicle and start the engine. This can be used through wireless software updates.

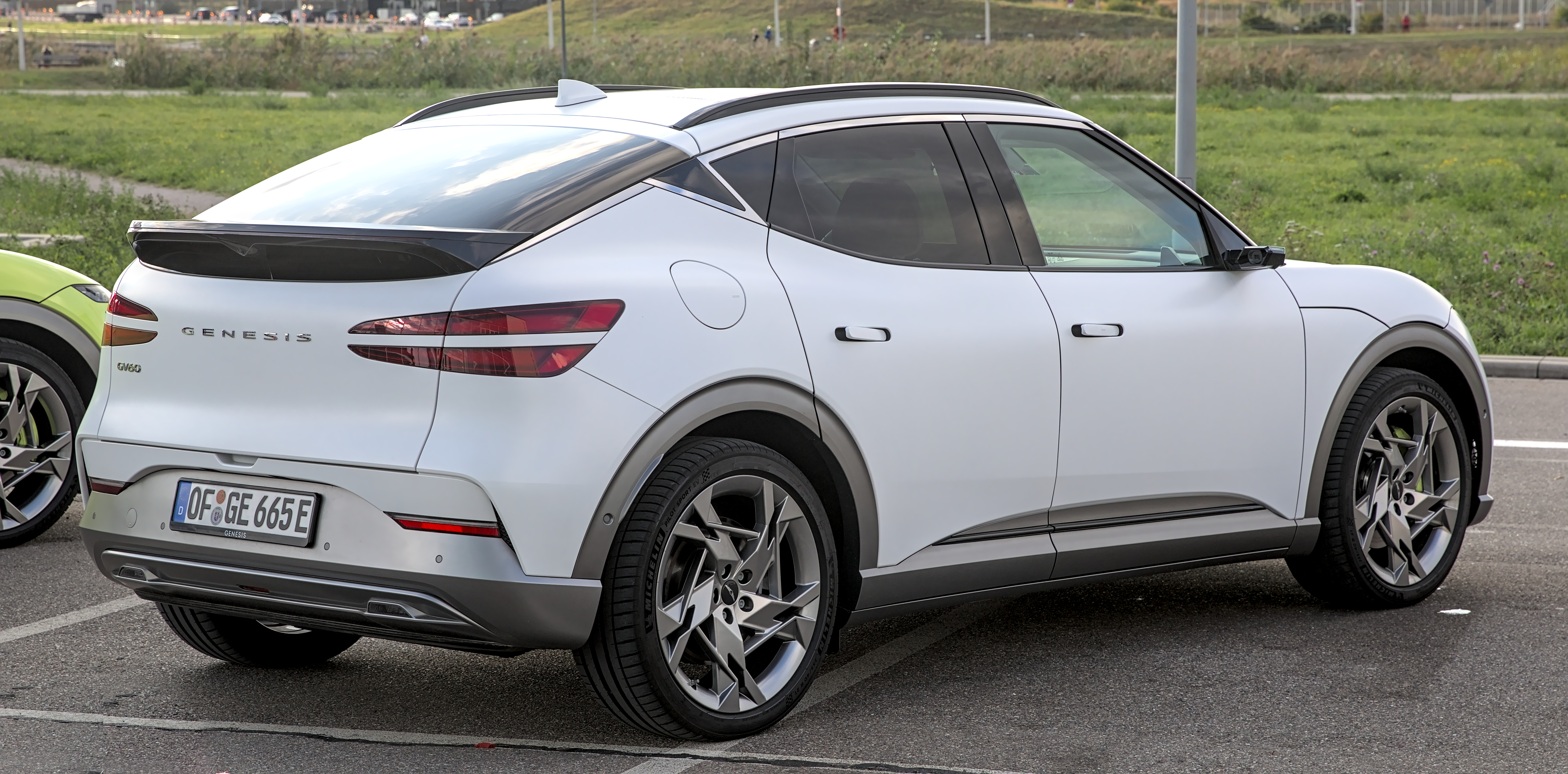
Rear view

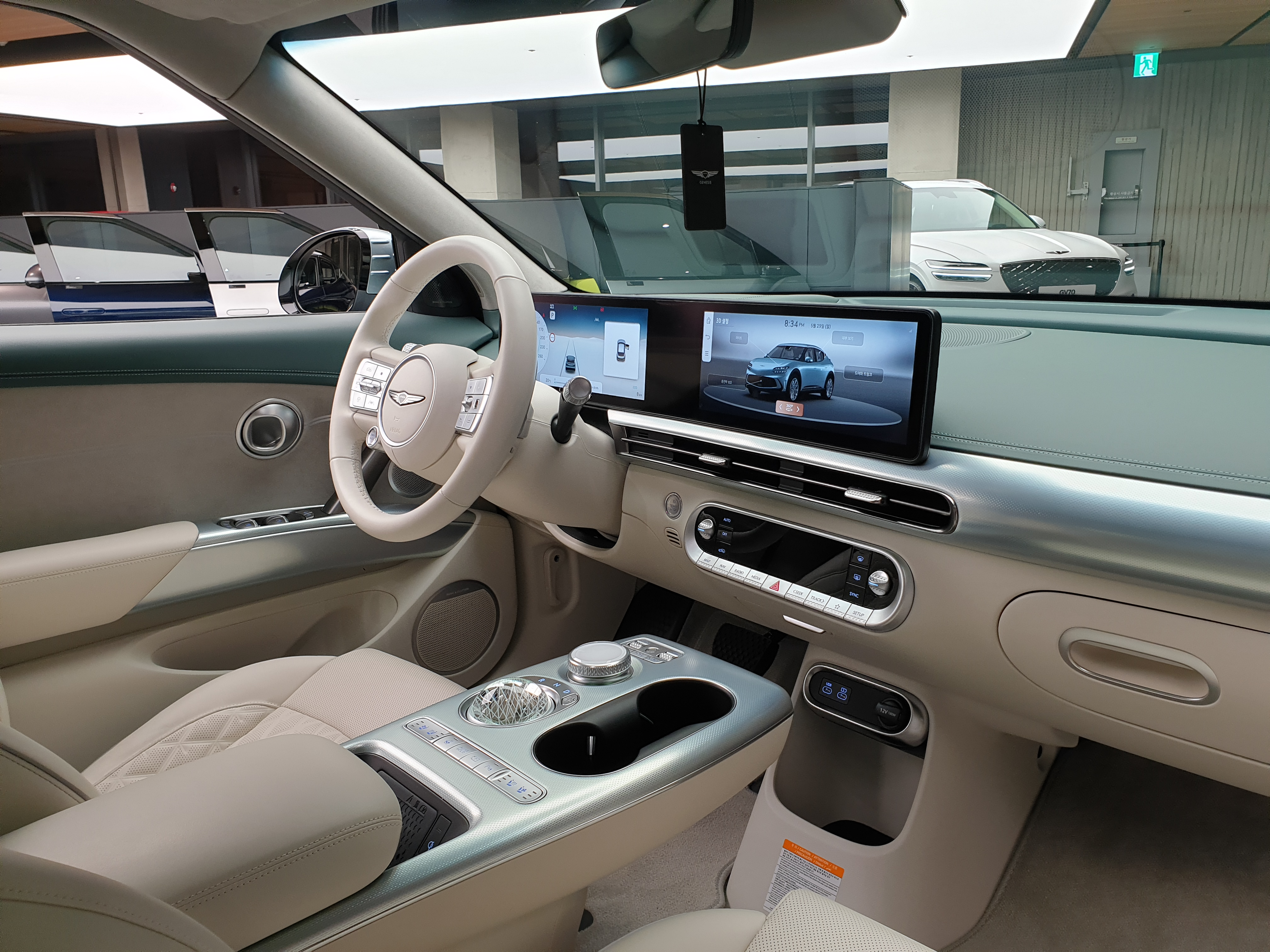
Interior

== Facelift ==
The facelifted version of the GV60 was officially announced on January 6, 2025, and subsequently launched in South Korea on March 6, 2025.

The updated exterior features a reshaped front fascia including headlights with Micro Lens Array technology, body-colored side skirts and wheel arches, and new wheel options. The drag coefficient has been lowered to 0.28 Cd.

The interior features a new 3-spoke steering wheel. The dual displays of the previous model has been replaced by a single 27-inch display, where the driver and central displays have been combined with no bezel.

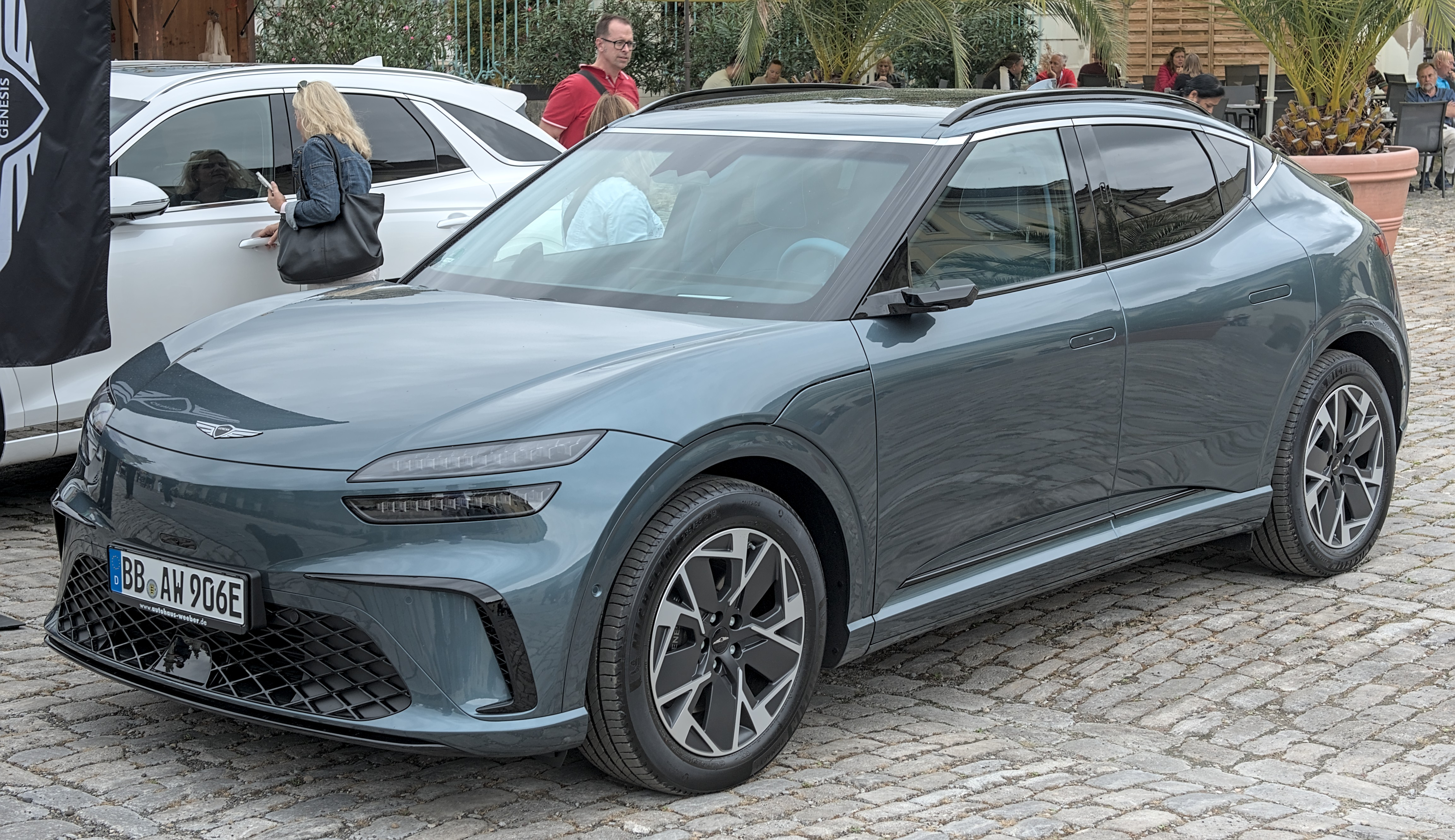
Front View

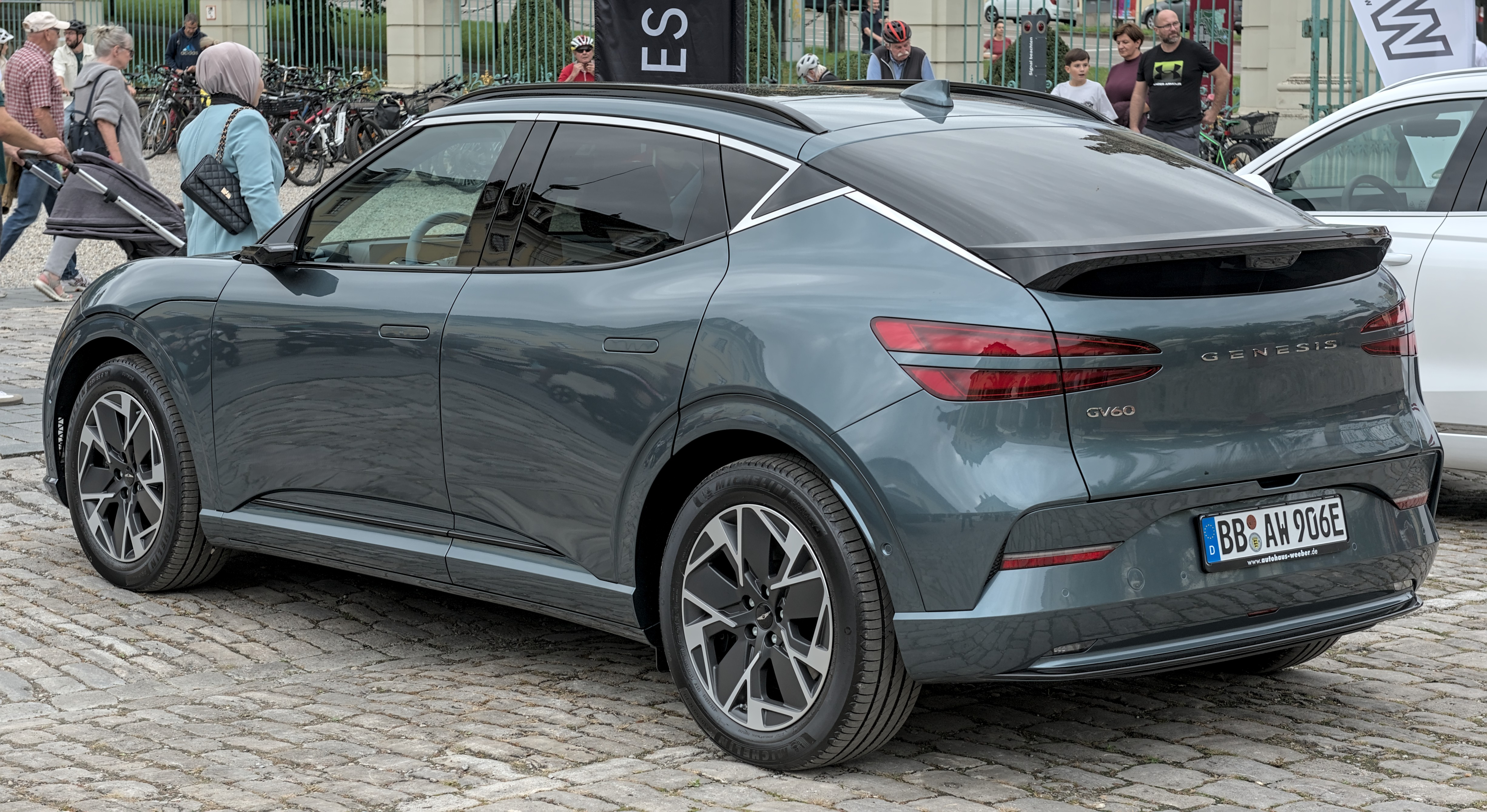
Rear View

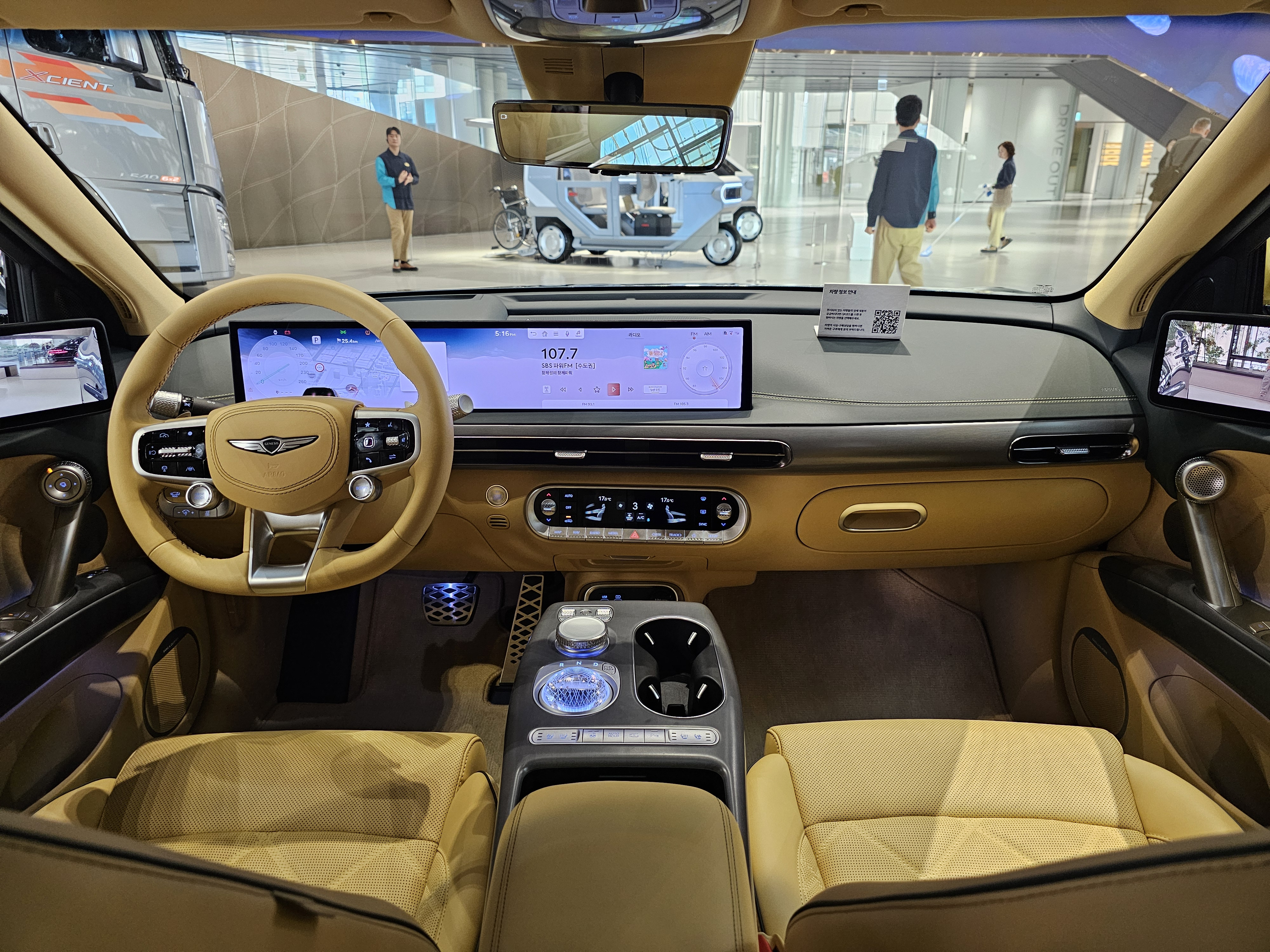
Interior

== GV60 Magma ==
The GV60 Magma is a high-performance version of the GV60 announced on 20 November 2025 for the 2027 model year. It was officially launched in North America on 30 July 2026.

Compared to the standard GV60, the GV60 Magma is 0.8 in (20 mm) lower. It also features widened fenders, a reworked front fascia that includes triple cooling vents, exclusive 21-inch forged wheels, as well as a functional rear wing. The interior uses a black and orange themed "Chamude" upholstery.

It retains the 84-kWh battery pack from the AWD Performance variant with an improved dual-motor all wheel drive powertrain, producing 641 hp (478 kW) and 583 lb⋅ft (790 Nm) of torque. It has a claimed 0-60 mph time of 3.4 seconds and a top speed of 164 miles per hour (264 km/h). It is also equipped with a faux gear shift system similar to that from the Hyundai Ioniq 5 N, known as the "Virtual Gear Shift" system. Compared to that system, which provides purely simulated shifts, this system is able to adjust the motor output and torque, including during regenerative braking. It has an artificial redline at 9000 rpm. Additionally, there are a choice of 3 artificial sounds, including that of a simulated V6 petrol engine.

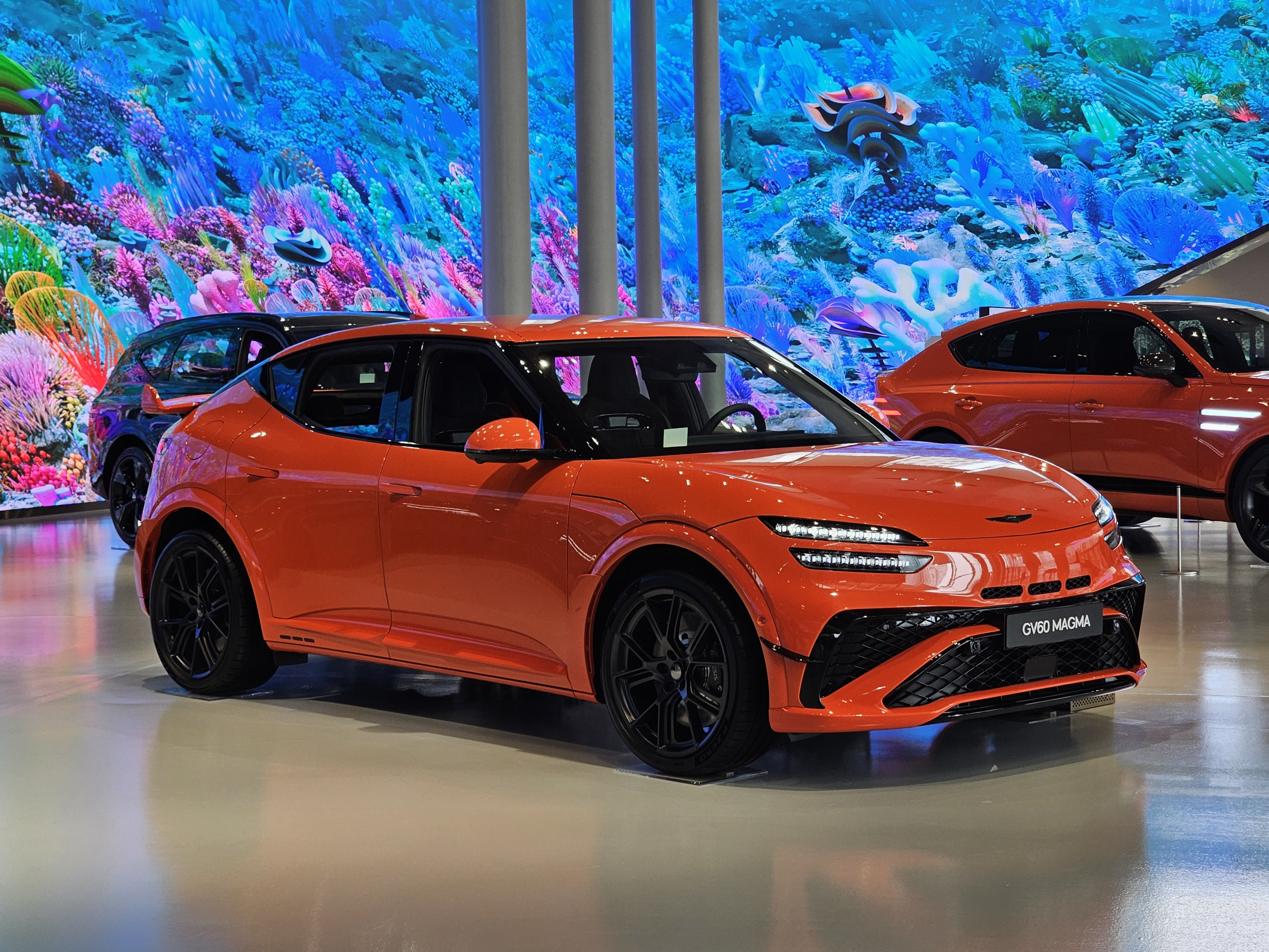
GV60 Magma

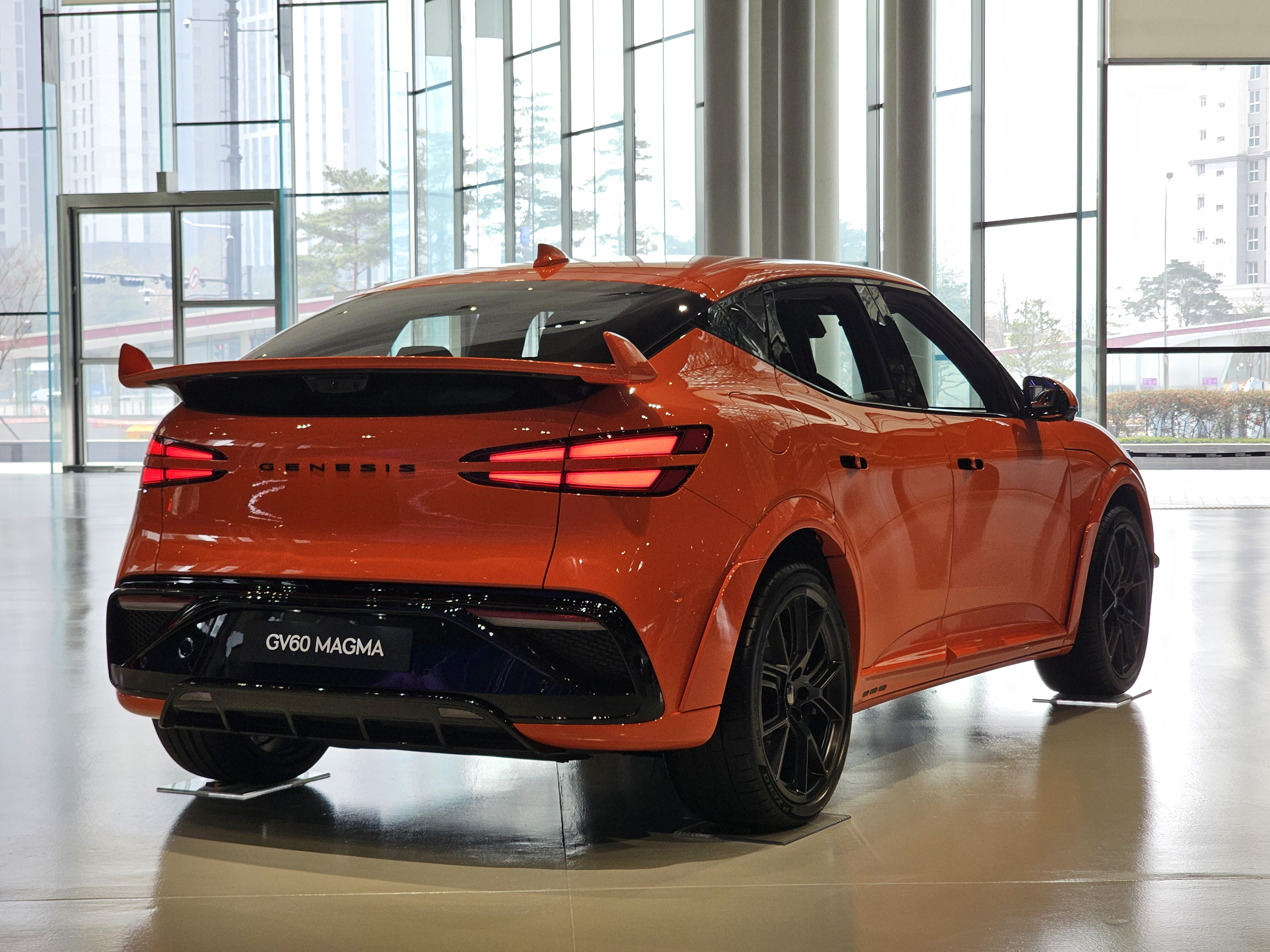
Rear View

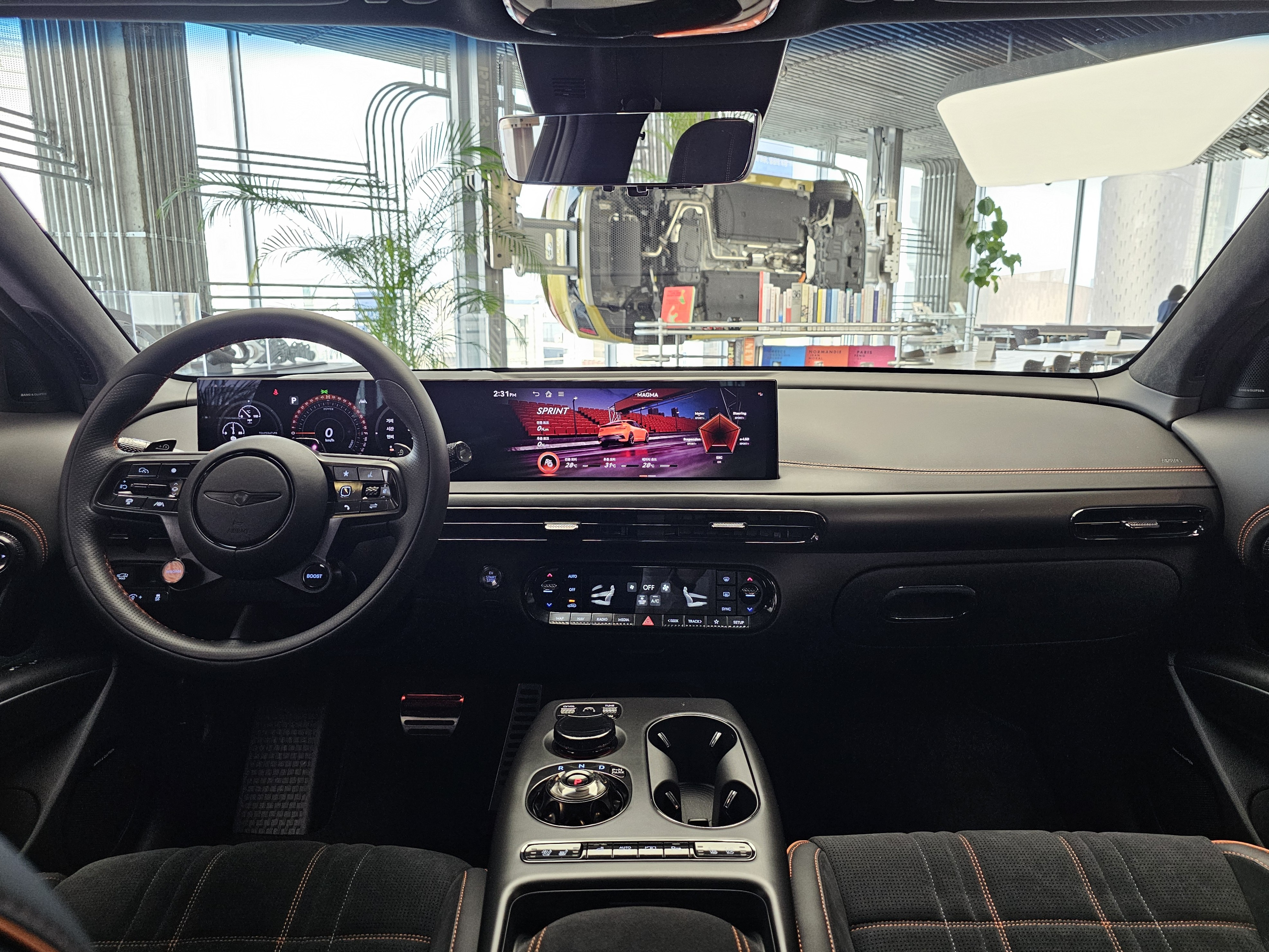
Interior

== Powertrain ==
The vehicle is available with a 77.4 kWh battery that can be charged from 10 to 80% in 18 minutes with its 800 V charging capabilities by using a 350 kW charger.

Specifications
Layout/Type	Years	Battery	Power	Torque	0–100 km/h (0–62 mph) (official)	Top speed	Range
RWD	2021–2025	77.4 kWh	168 kW (228 PS; 225 hp)	350 N⋅m (258 lbf⋅ft)	7.8 s	185 km/h (115 mph)	516 km (321 mi) (WLTP); 451 km (280 mi) (South Korea); 294 mi (473 km) (EPA)
RWD	2025–present	84 kWh	168 kW (228 PS; 225 hp)	350 N⋅m (258 lbf⋅ft)	7.8 s	185 km/h (115 mph)	481 km (299 mi) (South Korea)
AWD	2021–2025	77.4 kWh	234 kW (318 PS; 314 hp)	605 N⋅m (446 lbf⋅ft)	5.5 s	200 km/h (124 mph)	470 km (292 mi) (WLTP); 400 km (249 mi) (South Korea); 248 mi (399 km) (EPA)
AWD	2025–present	84 kWh	234 kW (318 PS; 314 hp)	605 N⋅m (446 lbf⋅ft)	5.5 s	200 km/h (124 mph)	437 km (272 mi) (South Korea)
AWD Performance	2021–2025	77.4 kWh	320 kW (435 PS; 429 hp)	605 N⋅m (446 lbf⋅ft)	4.0 s	235 km/h (146 mph)	466 km (290 mi) (WLTP); 368 km (229 mi) (South Korea); 235 mi (378 km) (EPA)
AWD Performance	2025–present	84 kWh	320 kW (435 PS; 429 hp)	605 N⋅m (446 lbf⋅ft)	4.0 s	235 km/h (146 mph)	382 km (237 mi) (South Korea)
Magma	2026–present	84 kWh	641 hp (478 kW)	790 N⋅m (583 lbf⋅ft)	3.4 s	264 km/h (164 mph)	-

== Safety ==
Euro NCAP test results for a LHD five door, with a registration from 2022.

Test	Score	Points
Overall:	5/5 stars	134.4
Adult occupant:	89%	34.1
Child occupant:	87%	43
Pedestrian:	63%	43.2
Safety assist:	88%	14.1

The vehicle features 7 airbags.

It has a SAE Level 2 pedestrian protection rating and features AEB and FCA.

ANCAP test results Genesis GV60 (2022, aligned with Euro NCAP)
Test	Points	%
Overall:	5 /5 stars	
Adult occupant:	34.09	89%
Child occupant:	43.62	89%
Pedestrian:	34.22	63%
Safety assist:	14.22	88%

== Awards ==
- Red Dot Award: Product Design 2022 (Cars and Motorcycles category)

== Sales ==
Year	South Korea	U.S.	China	Global
2021	1,190			1,214
2022	5,639	1,590		11,031
2023	3,198	3,400	81	10,145
2024	590	2,866	66	4,286
2025			22	
