= Hyundai Electric Global Modular Platform =

Electric Global Modular Platform (E-GMP)
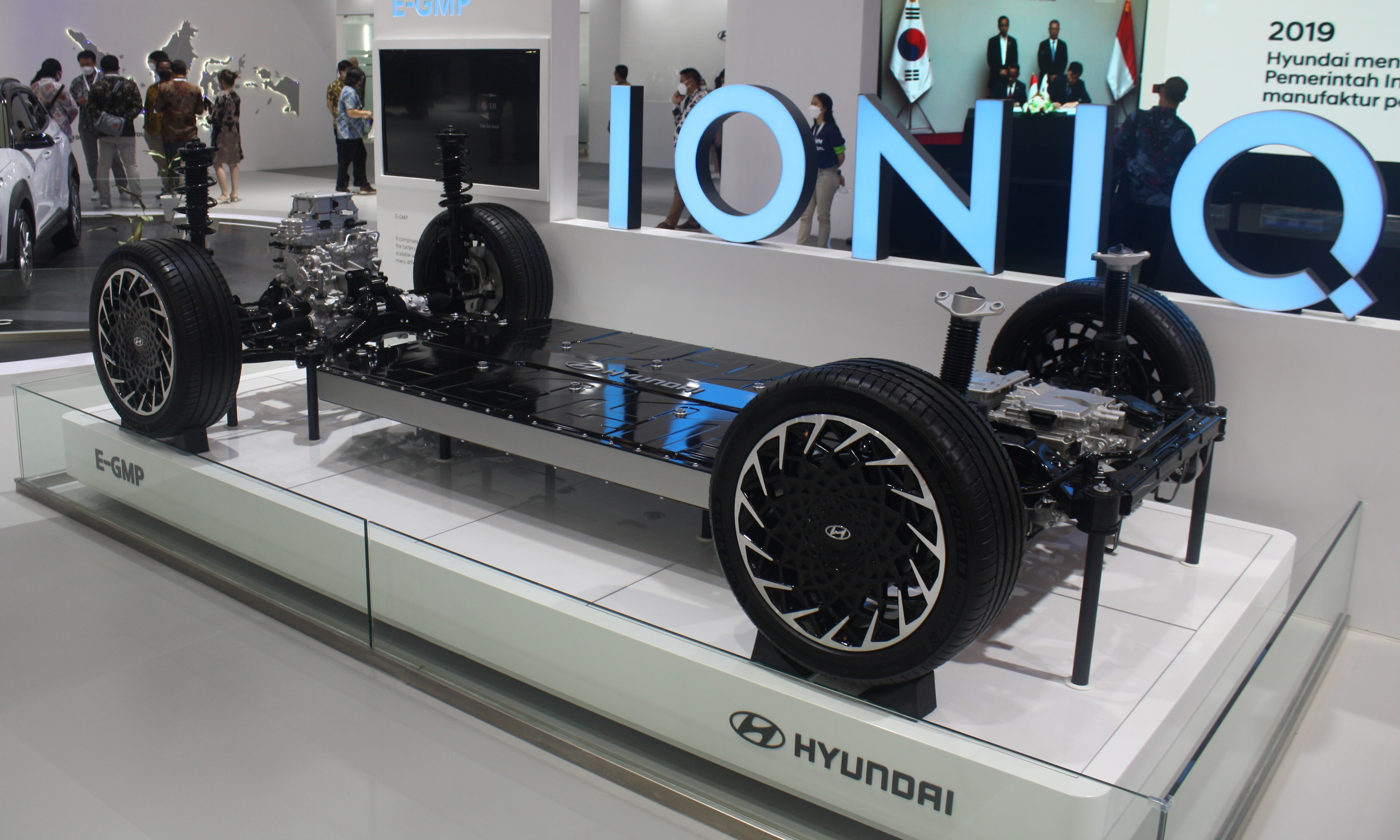
- Hyundai Electric Global Modular Platform components on display

Overview
- Manufacturer: Hyundai Motor Company; Kia Corporation
- Parent company: Hyundai Motor Group
- Production: 2021–present

Body and chassis
- Layout: Front-motor, front-wheel-drive; Rear-motor, rear-wheel-drive; Dual-motor, all-wheel-drive

Hyundai E-GMP (Electric Global Modular Platform) is a dedicated battery electric vehicle platform for Hyundai Motor Group automobiles. It is the first electric-only dedicated platform by Hyundai. It has been used for Hyundai, Kia, and Genesis automobiles since 2021. It follows Hyundai's earlier Power Electric System (PE System), which describes the drivetrain of an electric vehicle, including the traction motor, storage battery, and power electronics.

== History ==
=== 800 V architecture ===
The PE System serves the same function for an electric vehicle as an engine and a transmission for a vehicle powered by a conventional internal combustion engine. The first generation PE system used a discrete traction motor and power inverter electronic module, connected with an orange three-phase cable. In the second-generation PE system, the motor and inverter have been integrated, eliminating the cables and connectors.

In 2017, Hyundai confirmed reports that it was developing a dedicated platform for electric vehicles; at the time, only a few manufacturers had done so. The third-generation PE System consists of a compact, integrated powertrain module, including traction motor, reduction gear transmission, and power inverter. The third-generation PE system is used in the E-GMP platform. Four-wheel drive is provided by placing motors on the front and rear wheels. The integration of the motor-inverter housing lowered the inverter height by about 30 mm (1.2 in).

The PE System has also been installed into the Hyundai Vision FK concept, an eco-friendly hydrogen electric vehicle. In this vehicle, the PE System has been combined with a hydrogen fuel cell system.

A standardized battery system can be tuned and implemented as part of the system appropriate for a specific vehicle segment. This system is said to maximize driving range or meet the needs of a customer.

=== 400 V architecture ===
Kia markets EV3 and EV5 as based on the E-GMP 400 V architecture. Their chassis are derived from the front-wheel-drive Hyundai-Kia K3 and N3 platforms, with body structures redesigned for the battery electric vehicles.

== Technical design (800 V architecture) ==
The E-GMP platform is an 800 V architecture with scalable wheelbase length, and supports batteries from multiple manufacturers. The motor, inverter, and transmission are integrated into a single powertrain unit.

=== Traction motor ===
Both single motor 2WD (rear axle) and dual motor AWD are supported. Hyundai claim the motor is approximately 10% more efficient than a conventional motor due to "hairpin winding technology", allowing the coils to be wound more densely, and more effective cooling.

=== Reduction gear transmission ===
The transmission reduces the traction motor speed and applies torque to the driven axle. This effectively multiplies torque at the wheel for electric vehicles. In addition, an EV Transmission Disconnector is provided, which allows for the motor and drive axle to be disconnected, which enables free shifting between 2WD (two-wheel drive) and 4WD (four-wheel drive). This is only available for the all-wheel drive system.

=== Battery and charging ===
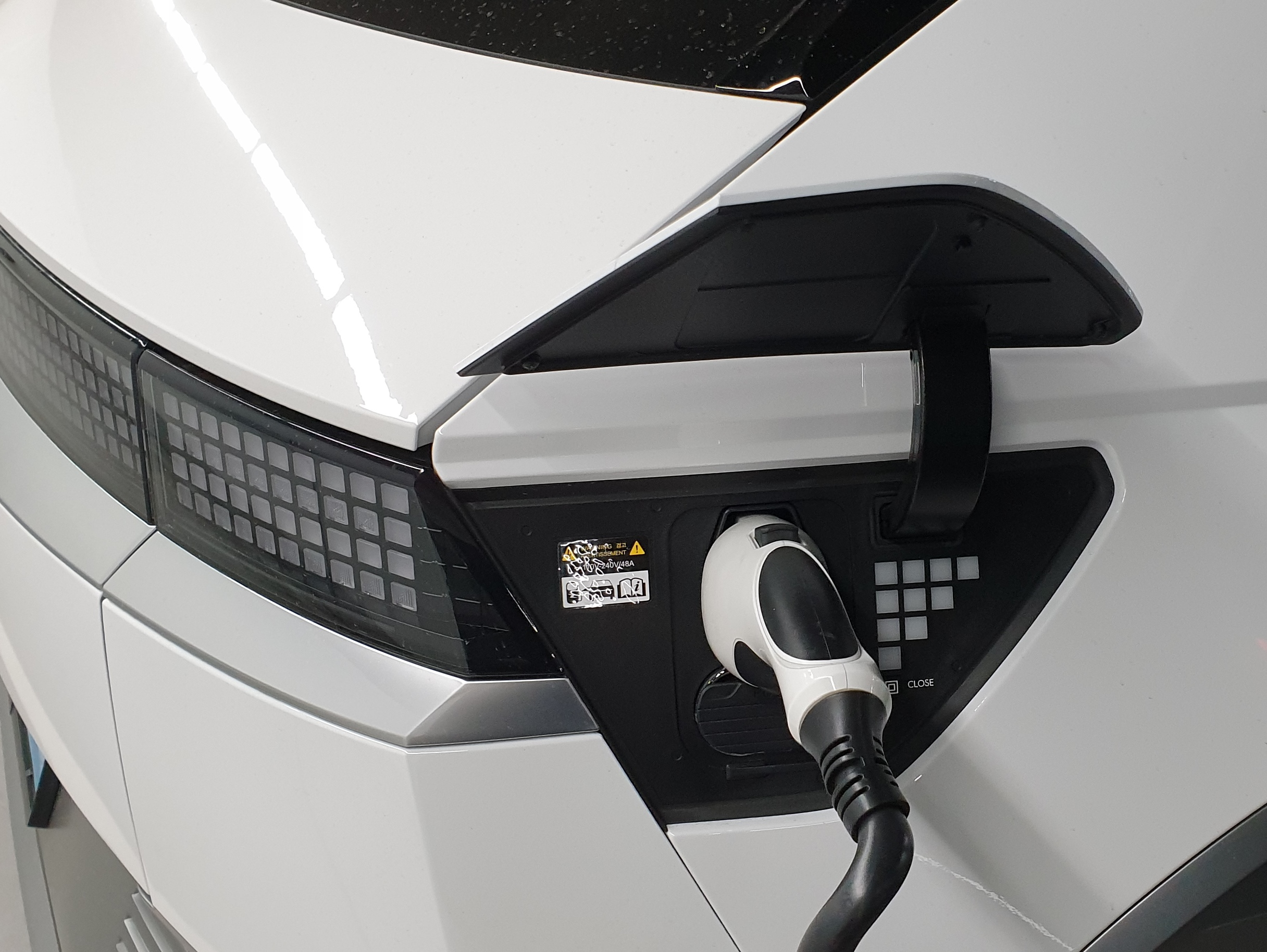
Hyundai Ioniq 5 charging

The Li-ion batteries are pouch-format and the battery pack is designed to be 13 cm (5.1 in) tall. E-GMP vehicles are expected to have a range of at least 500 km (310 mi) under the WLTP test cycle. Vehicles will support 200 kW fast charging; Hyundai claim an 18-minute charge will restore 80% of capacity (80% SOC of 77.4 kWh in 18 minutes) and a 5-minute charge will add 100 km (62 mi) of range when using a high-power (800 V/350 kW) DC fast charging supply. By standardizing the battery type and size, repairs can be carried out more economically by replacing a single module, rather than the entire battery pack. Hyundai claim that power density has increased by 10% with the E-GMP.

Current (as of 2022) DC fast charging infrastructure has a power and voltage of 50–350 kW and 400-920 V. The E-GMP electronics support voltages of both 400 V and 800 V charging systems and offers bi-directional charging (V2L (110/230 V and up to 3.7 kW), V2V and V2G). The platform uses the vehicle's motor/inverter to convert incoming DC current at 400 V to 800 V.

=== Inverter ===
The inverter converts direct current electrical energy stored in the battery to the alternating current power used in the traction motor. The inverter power module comes with silicon carbide (SiC) semiconductors. These are proven to be more efficient than existing semiconductors that are only made with Silicon, as one but not limited to the increase of thermal management, where the thermal conductivity of silicon carbide is 1490W/m-K (Watts per meter-Kelvin), compared to the 150 W/m-K offered by Silicon. SiC is used for the rear (main) motor to minimize conversion losses and to facilitate its use in high-voltage and high-current circuits. The front motor, on vehicles so equipped, will use silicon-based power electronics to reduce costs. In 2022, Hyundai announced that it will switch to SiC for the front motor inverter also, improving efficiency and range by approximately 5%.

=== Chassis ===
The platform supports a wheelbase exceeding 3,000 mm (118.1 in). E-GMP supports various sizes and configurations of vehicles, including C-segment, E-segment, CUV, sedan, and SUV, including three-row SUVs with seven seats. Albert Biermann stated that "existing [derivative] EVs on ICEV platforms will see some expansions into smaller segments", which was clarified to mean that smaller EVs would continue to use a front-wheel-drive platform. The rear suspension uses a five-link arrangement. An integrated drive axle is used, in which the drive shaft and wheel bearings are a single unit; this reduces the number of parts and increases rigidity.

The battery is attached to the full-perimeter frame using eight bolts running completely through the battery for strength. The front and rear crumple zones are designed to absorb and dissipate the energy of a potential impact, and high strength steel is used to protect the battery and passenger compartment.

== Applications ==
Hyundai plans to release 23 battery electric vehicles, including 11 exclusively electric vehicles, using the E-GMP platform.

=== 800 V architecture ===
- Genesis GV60 (JW) (2021–present)
- Hyundai Ioniq 5 (NE) (2021–present)
- Kia EV6 (CV) (2021–present)
- Hyundai Ioniq 6 (CE) (2022–present)
- Kia EV9 (MV) (2023–present)
- Hyundai Ioniq 9 (ME) (2025–present)
- Hyundai Elexio (OE1) (2025–present)

=== 400 V architecture ===
- Hyundai Ioniq 3 (BJ1) (2026-present)
- Kia EV2 (QV1) (2026–present)
- Kia EV3 (SV) (2024–present)
- Kia EV4 (CT) (2025–present)
- Kia EV5 (OV) (2025–present)

=== Ioniq in China ===
- Hyundai Ioniq V (EA1c) (2026–present)

==== 800 V architecture ====
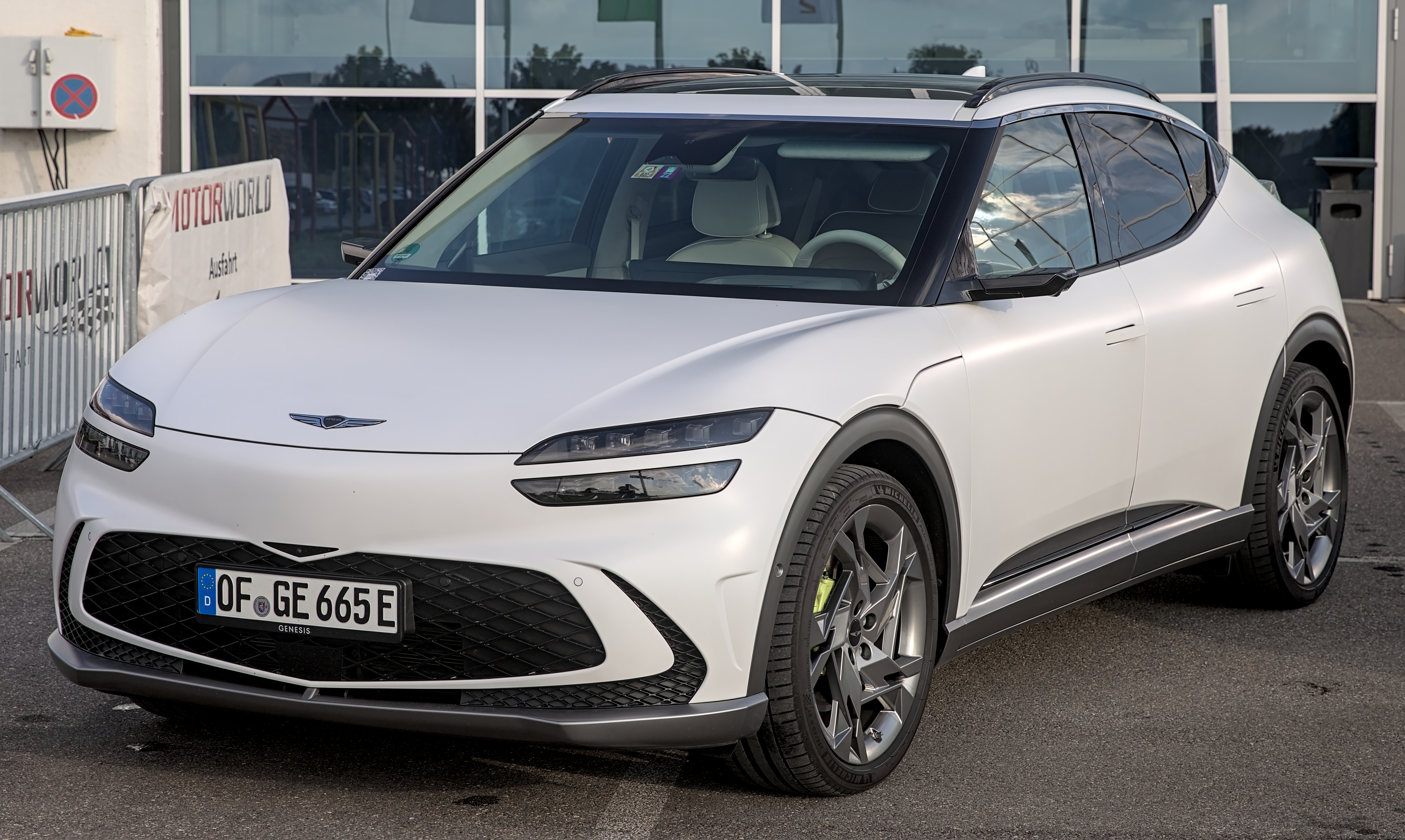
Genesis GV60

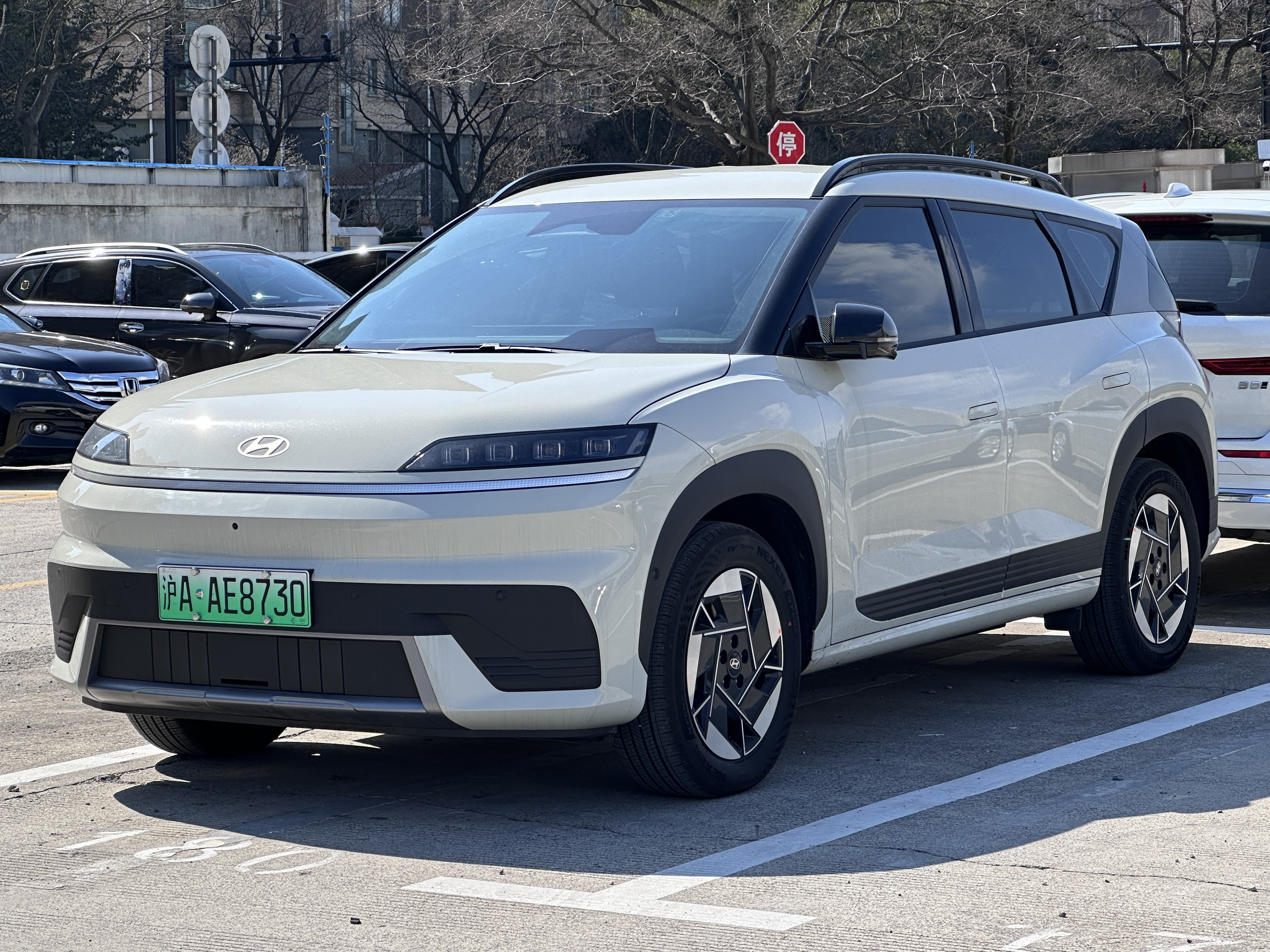
Hyundai Elexio

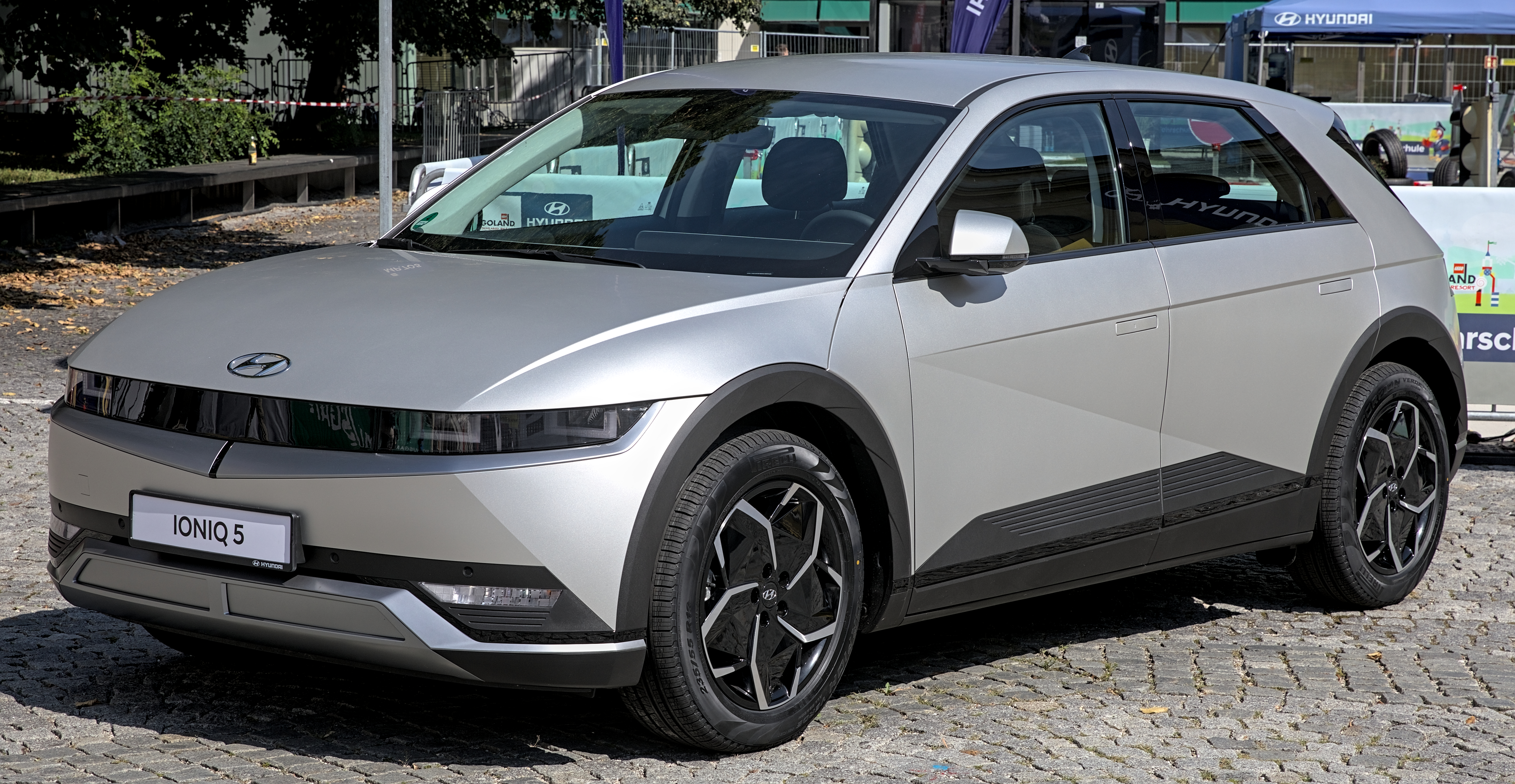
Hyundai Ioniq 5

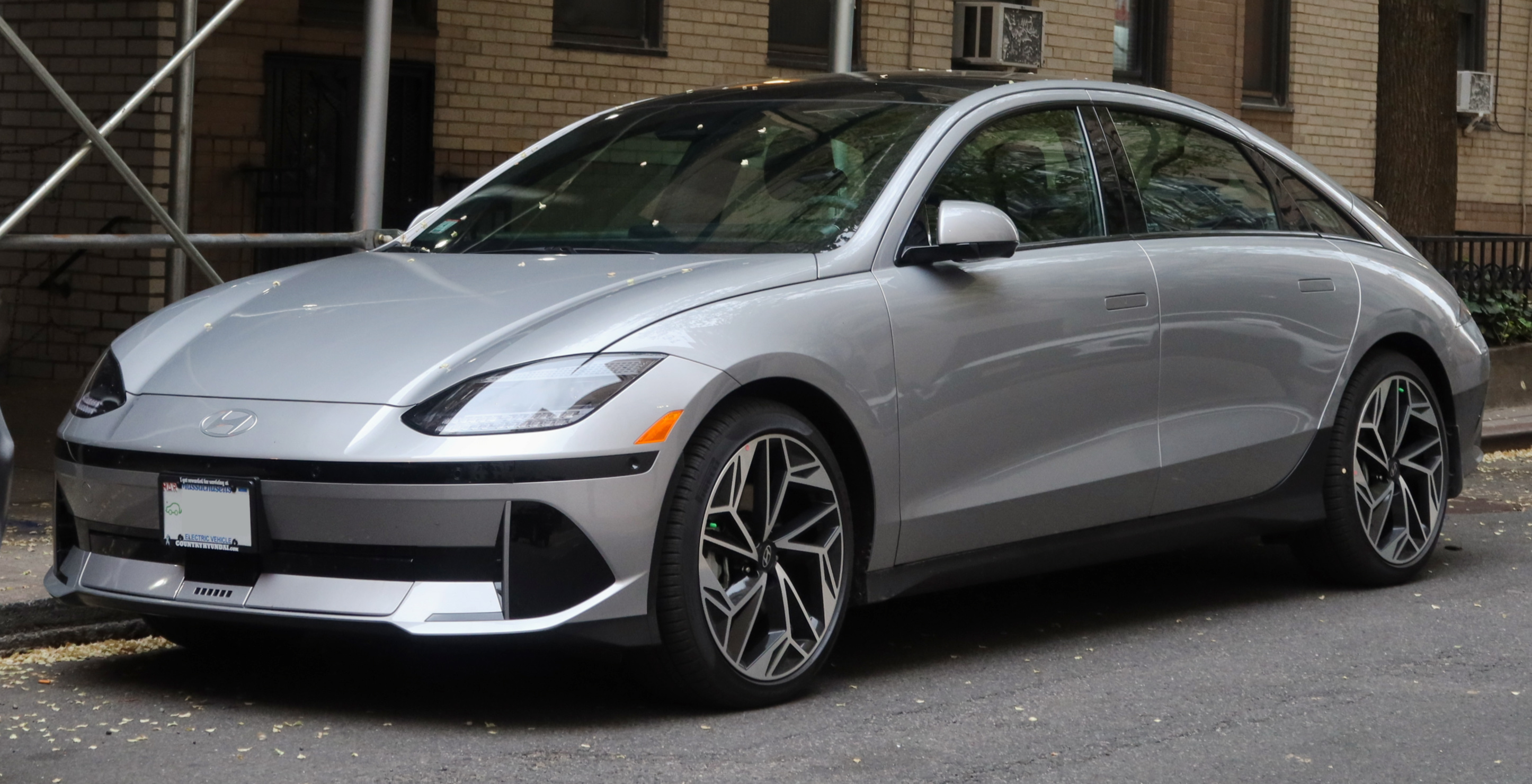
Hyundai Ioniq 6

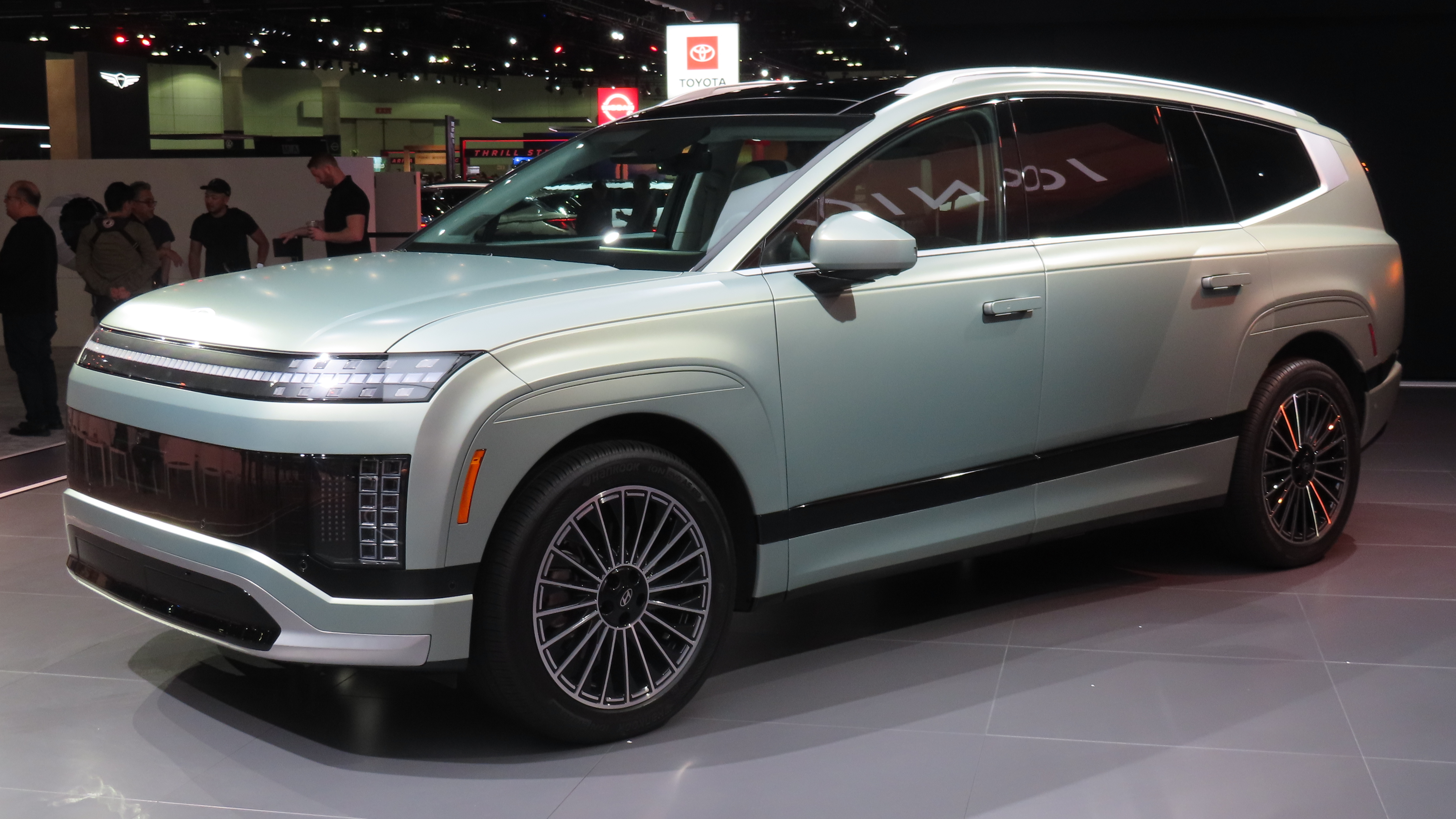
Hyundai Ioniq 9

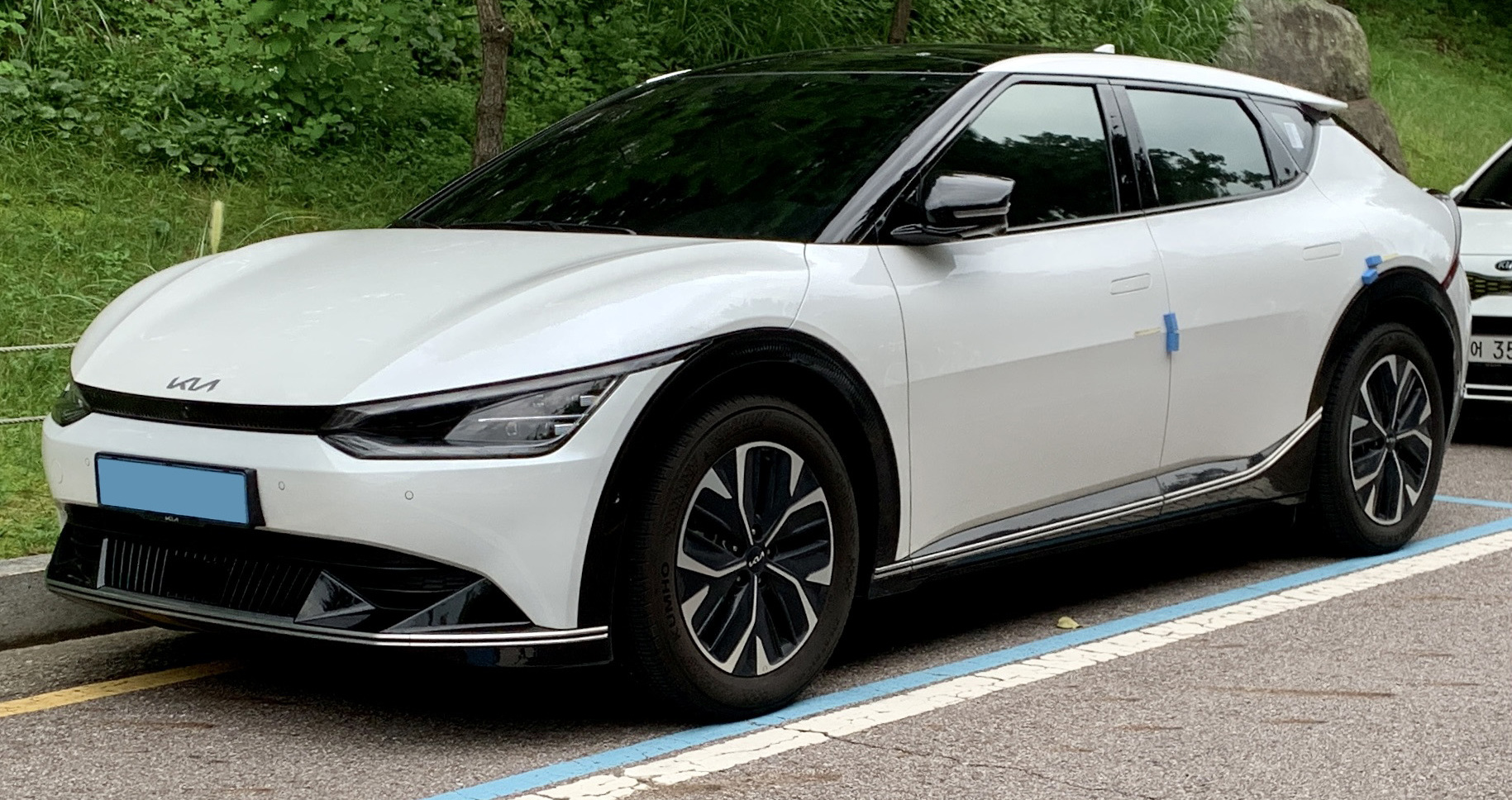
Kia EV6

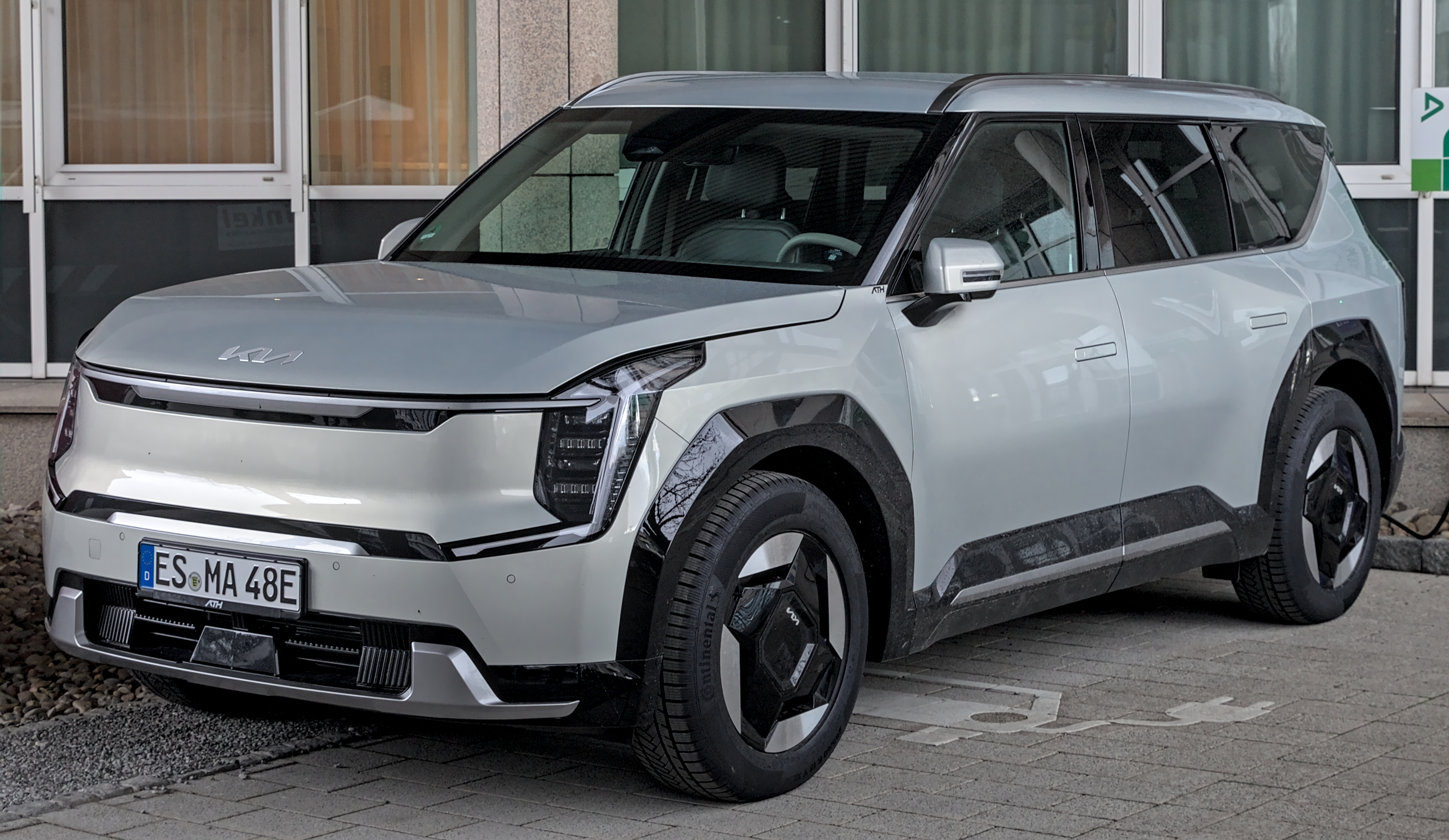
Kia EV9

==== 400 V architecture ====
Hyundai Ioniq 3

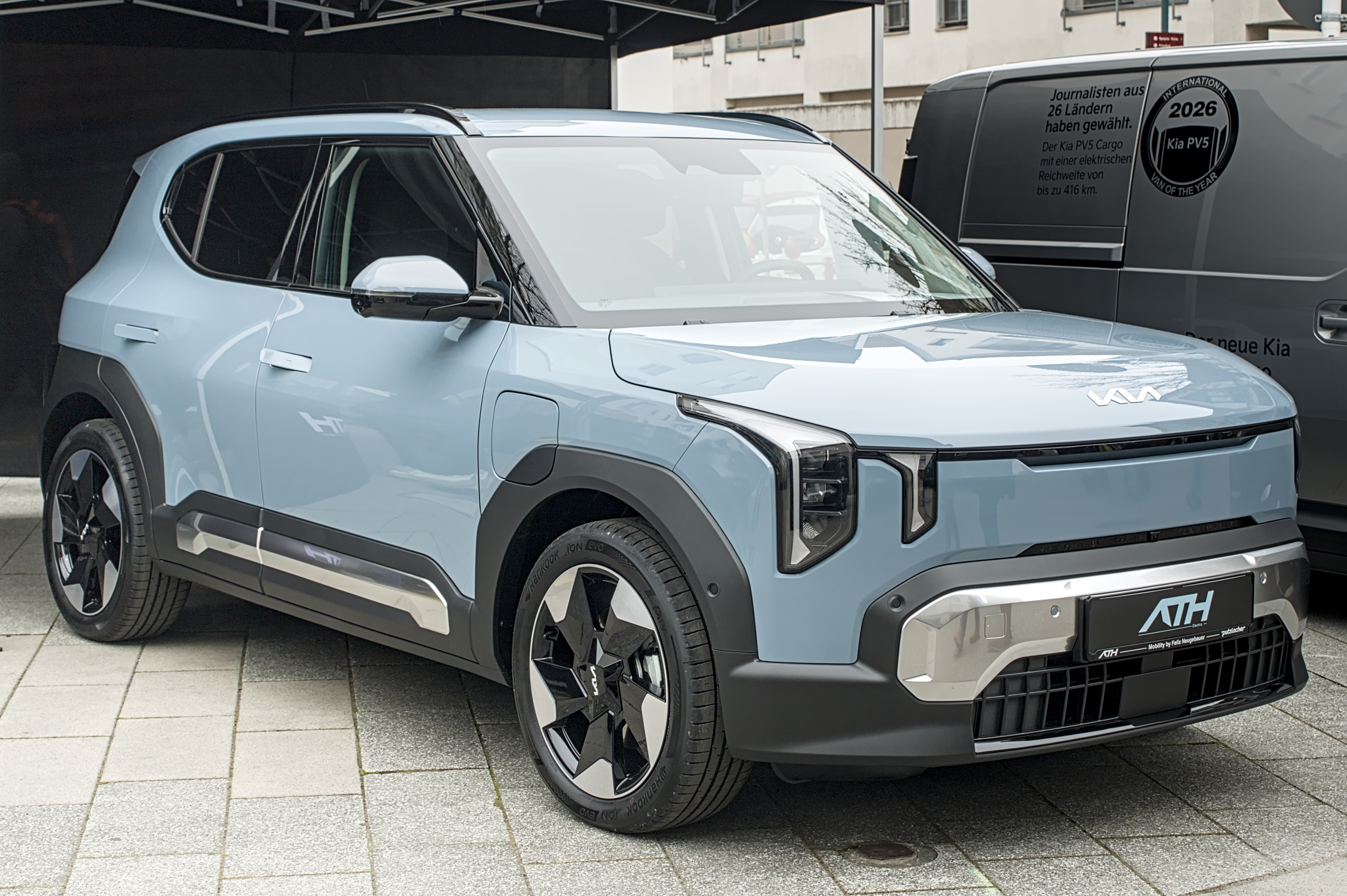
Kia EV2

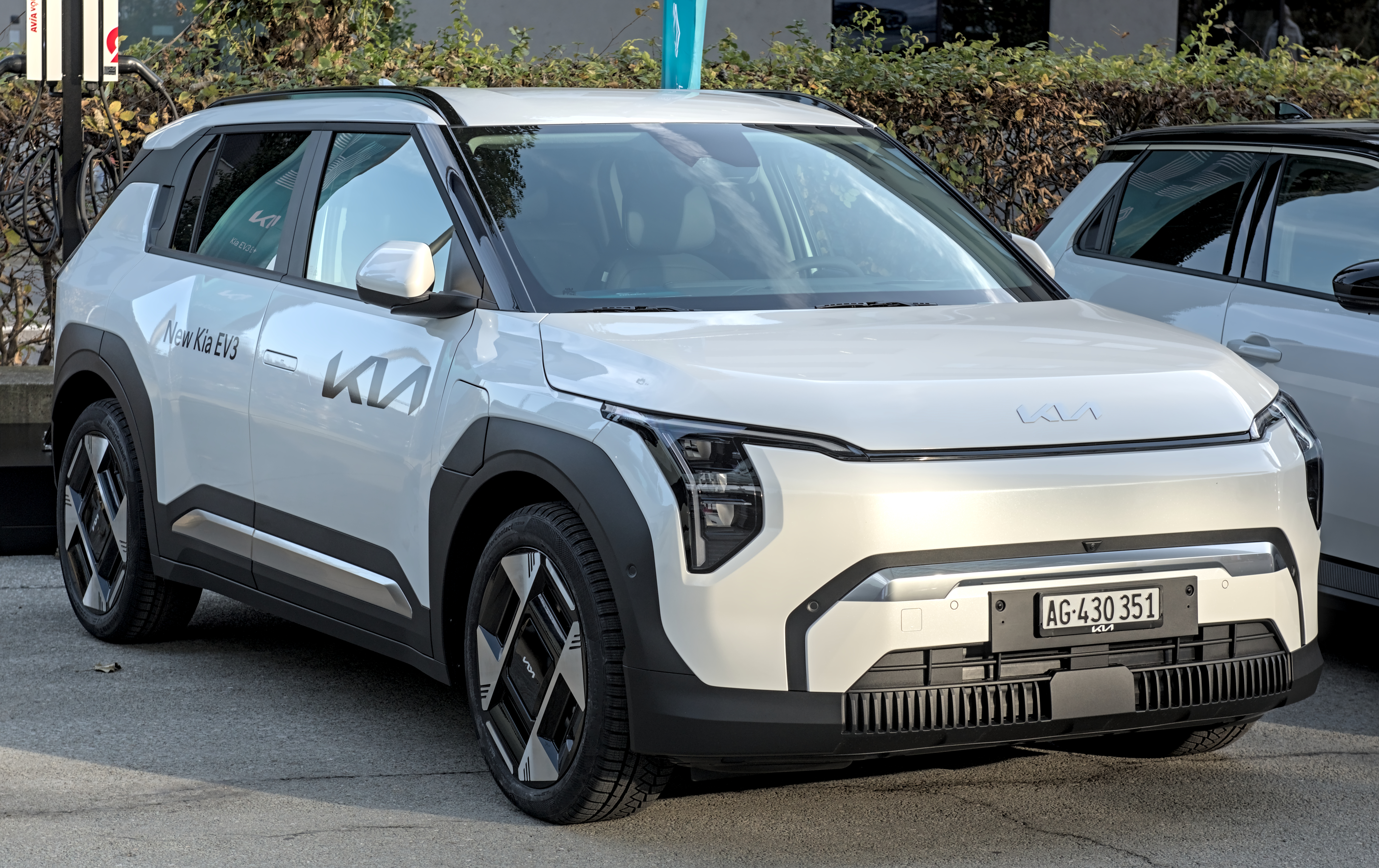
Kia EV3

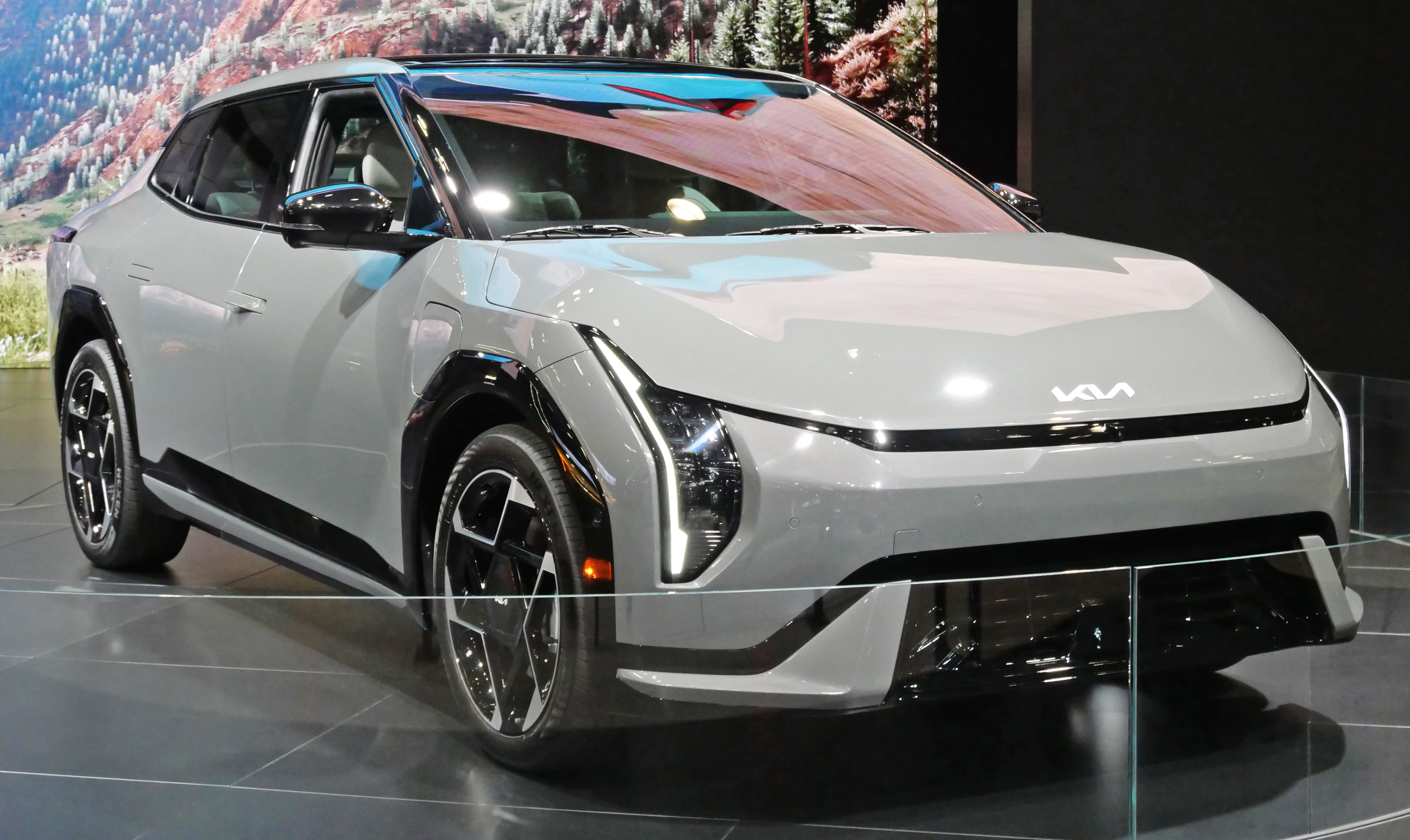
Kia EV4

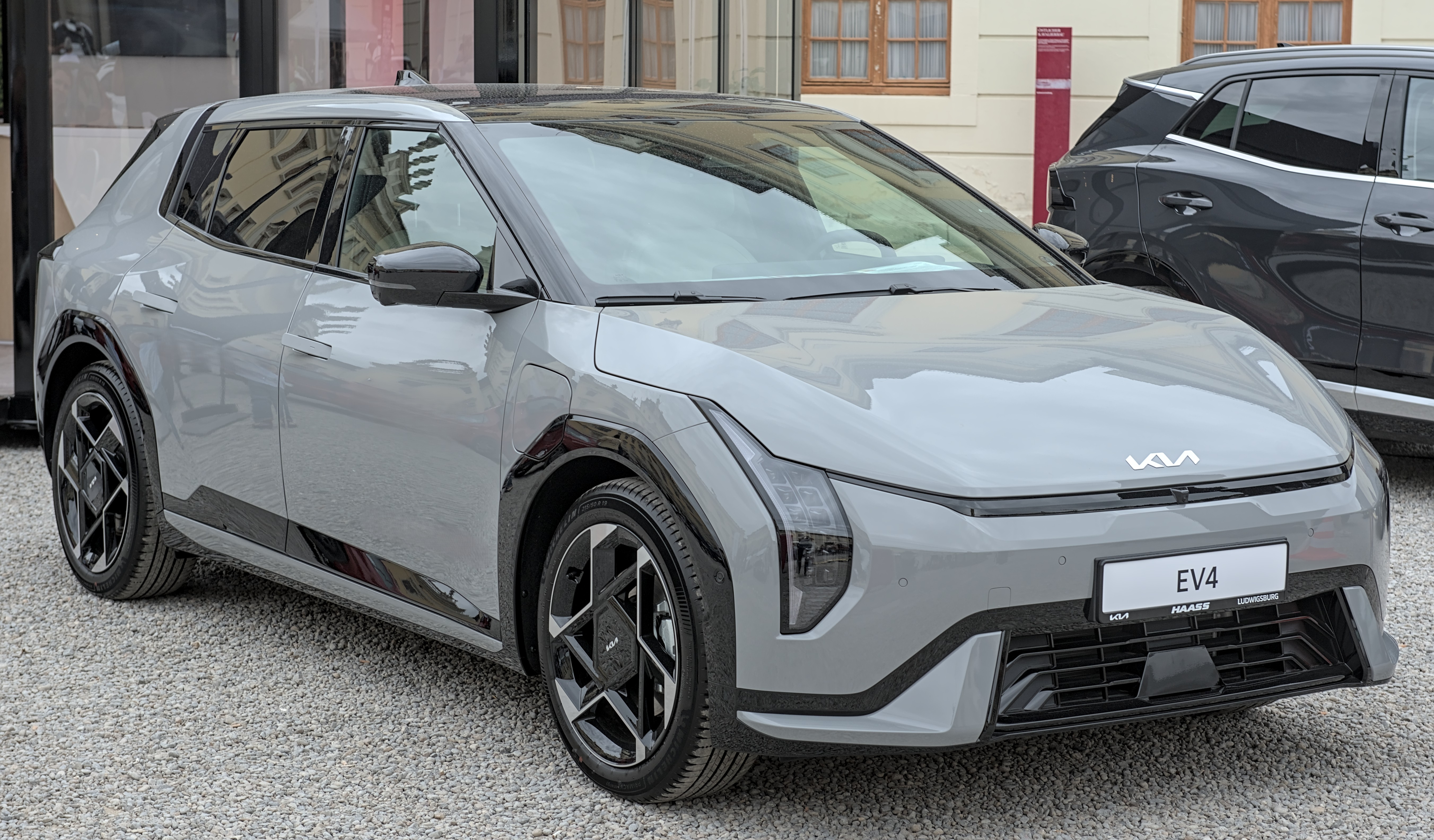
Kia EV4 hatchback

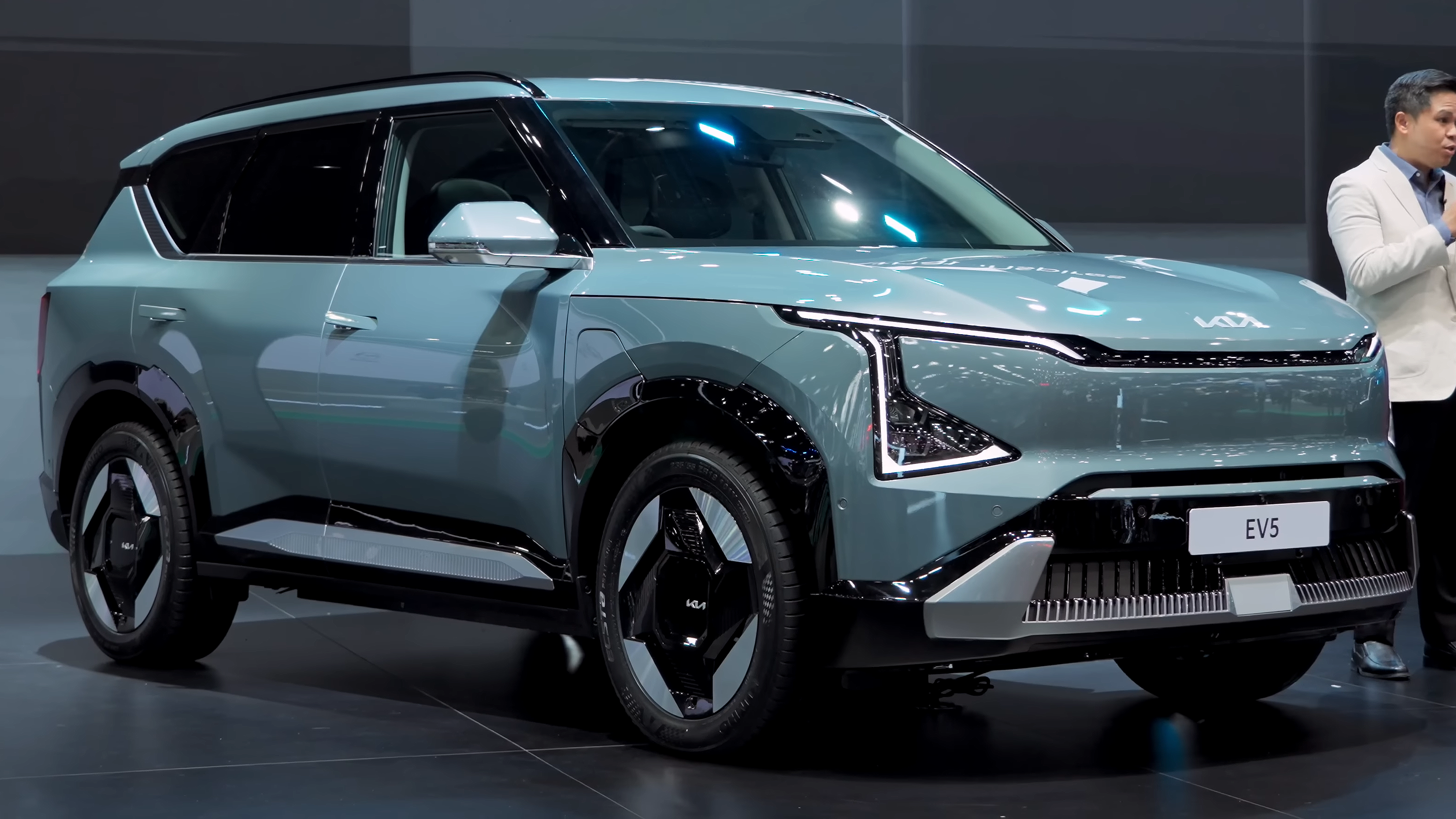
Kia EV5

==== Ioniq in China ====
Hyundai Ioniq V

== E-GMP.S ==
The E-GMP.S (service) is based on the E-GMP. It is configured in a form that allows various upper bodies to be applied on top of the flat platform of E-GMP, and was first installed in Kia's Purpose-Built Vehicle model, the PV5.

=== Applications ===
- Kia PV5 (SW1) (2025–present)
- Kia PV7 (LW1) (2026–present)
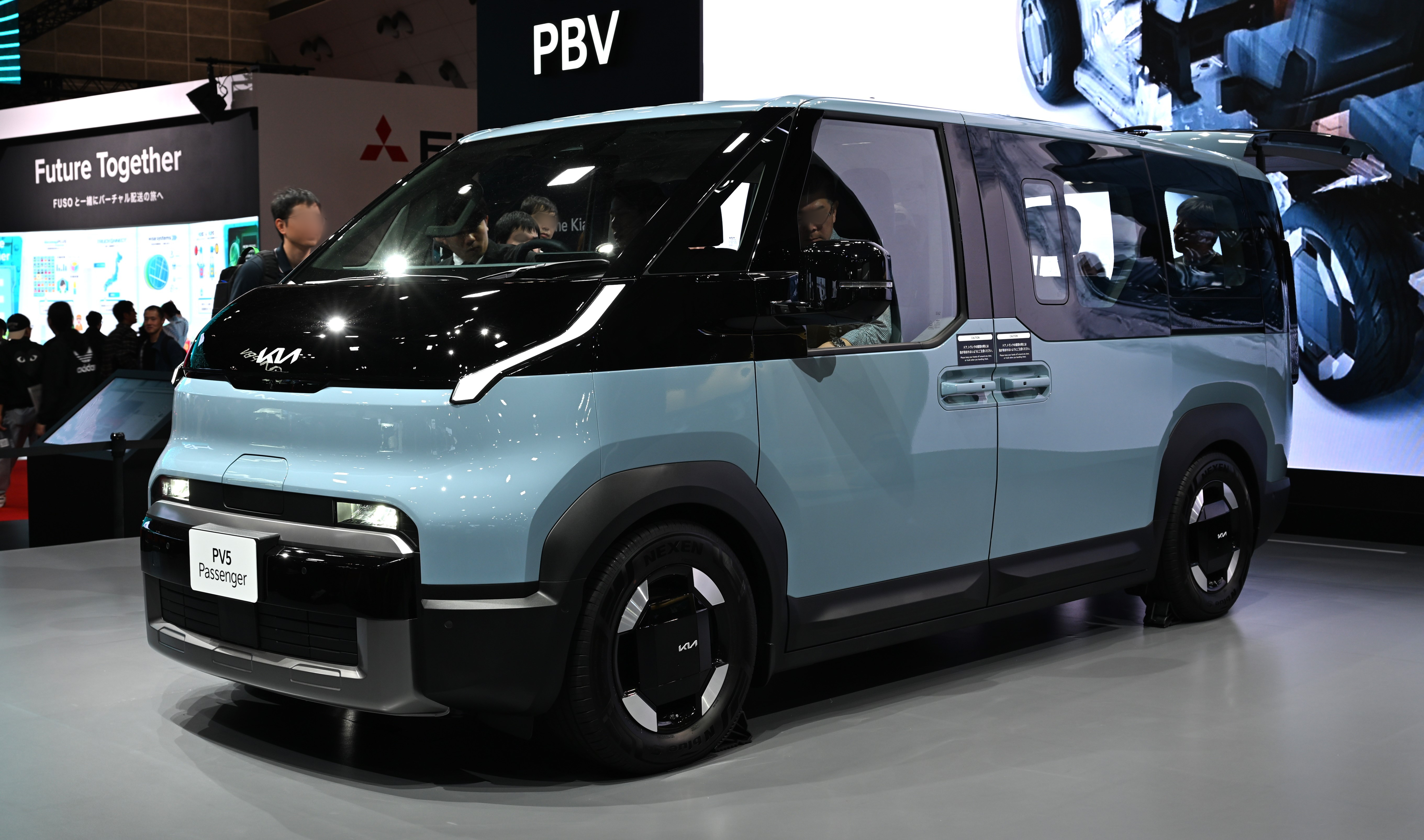
Kia PV5

== See also ==
- Volkswagen Group MEB platform – a similar multi-vehicle electric platform
- Hyundai Purpose-Built Vehicle platform – a similar multi-vehicle electric platform for commercial vehicles
- Ioniq
- Kia EV series
