= Kia electric vehicles =

Electric car series

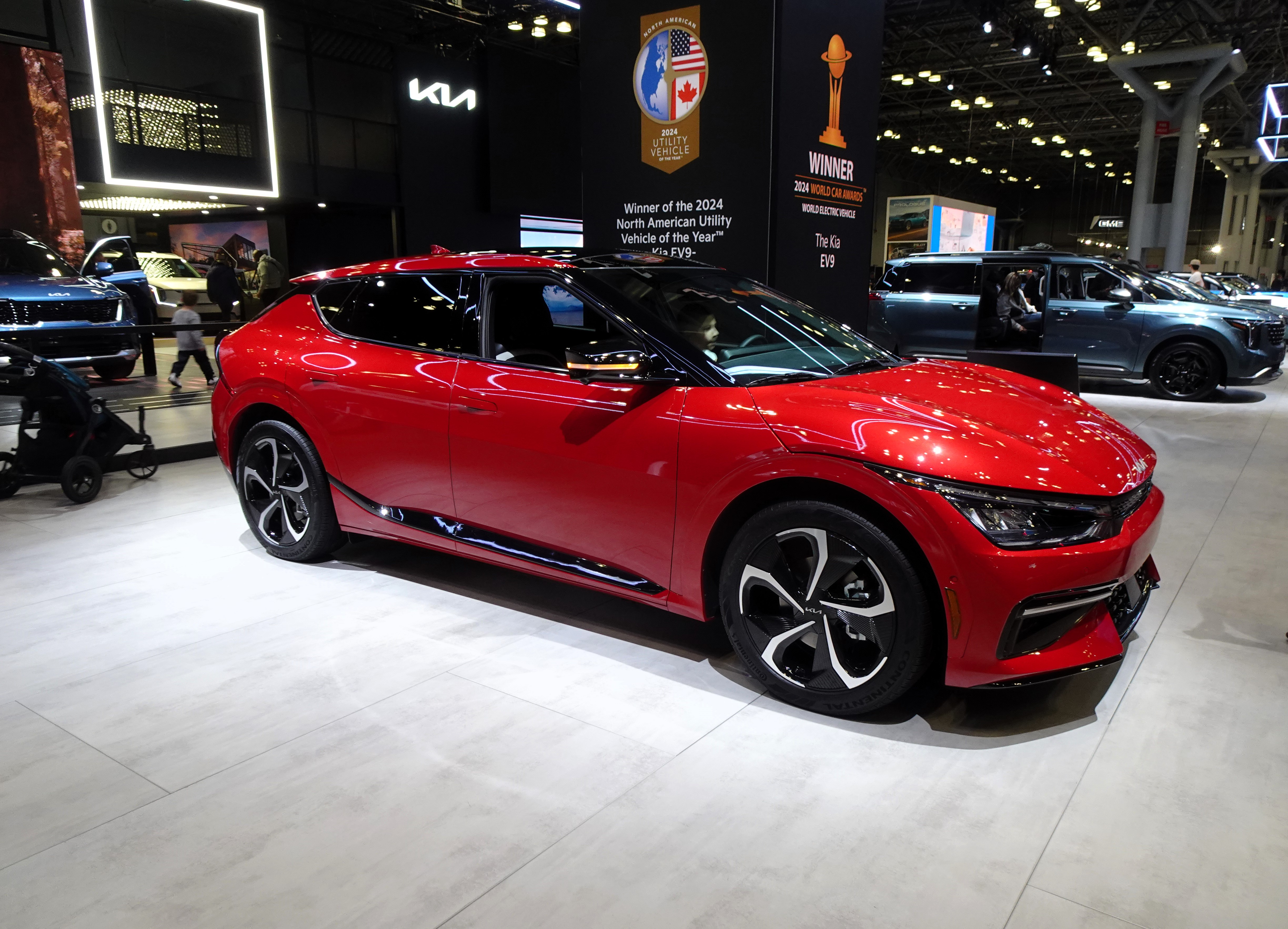
- The Kia EV6 GT at the 2024 New York International Auto Show
- Product type: Battery electric vehicles
- Produced by: Kia
- Introduced: 2021; 5 years ago

The Kia electric vehicles include the Kia EV series and the PV series. It is a family of battery electric vehicles from Kia. All EV models are built using the Electric Global Modular Platform (E-GMP), with the exception of EV5, which uses the Hyundai-Kia N3 eK platform.

== History and etymology ==
The vehicle names of the Kia EV series are "EV" appended by a number according to the vehicle class. The first vehicle in the EV series is the EV6. The EV9, which was released in Korea in June 2023, won the 2024 World Car Awards and the World Car of the Year.

== Kia EV Day ==
The Kia EV Day is an event to introduce new electric vehicles while sharing the brand's vision.

The 2023 Kia EV Day was held in Yeoju, Gyeonggi Province, Korea. The EV5 was first unveiled in Korea, and the EV4 Concept and EV3 Concept were introduced for the first time in the world.

The 2024 Kia EV Day was held in Taipei, Taiwan. The EV3 and EV5 were first unveiled in Taiwan, and the EV4 Concept and PV5 Concept were introduced for the first time in the Asia.

The 2025 Kia EV Day was held in Tarragona, Spain, and the EV4, PV5, EV2 Concept for the first time in the world.

== Production models ==
The following electric vehicles are produced by the Korean automobile manufacturer Kia:

- Bongo EV (Korea only), 2020–present
- Carens Clavis EV, 2025–present
- EV2, 2026–present
- EV3, 2024–present
- EV4, 2025–present
- EV5, (except United States) 2023–present
- EV6, 2021–present
- EV9, 2023–present
- PV5, 2025–present
- PV7, 2026–present
- K3 EV (China only), 2019–2021
- KX3 EV (China only), 2018–2019
- Niro Plus, 2022–2024
- Niro EV (e-Niro in Europe), 2018–2026
- Ray EV, 2011–2018; 2023–present
- Soul EV (e-Soul in Europe), 2014–2024
- Syros EV, 2026–present

| Model | Release | Markets | Concept | Vehicle information |
|---|---|---|---|---|
| EV6 | August 2021 | Global | Kia Imagine | Battery electric compact crossover SUV Featuring shooting brake looks |
| EV9 | March 2023 | Global | Concept EV9 | Battery electric mid-size crossover SUV with three-row seating |
| EV5 | August 2023 | Global (except United States) | Concept EV5 (China) | Battery electric mid-size crossover SUV Younger sibling to the EV9 |
| EV3 | May 2024 | Majority of regions worldwide | Concept EV3 | Battery electric compact crossover SUV |
| EV4 Sedan | February 2025 | Global | Concept EV4 | Battery electric compact sedan |
| EV4 Hatchback | February 2025 | Europe | – | Battery electric compact hatchback Hatchback version of the EV4 |
| EV2 | January 2026 | Europe | Concept EV2 | Battery electric subcompact car / supermini car Features inspiration from the Soul. |

== See also ==
- Ioniq
- E-GMP
