= Kia EV2 =

Battery electric supermini car produced by Kia

Overview
- Manufacturer: Kia
- Model code: QV1
- Production: March 2026 – present
- Assembly: Slovakia: Žilina (Kia Slovakia)

Body and chassis
- Class: Subcompact car (B)
- Body style: 5-door hatchback
- Layout: Front-motor, front-wheel-drive
- Platform: E-GMP (400 V architecture)
- Related: Hyundai Ioniq 3

Dimensions
- Wheelbase: 2,565 mm (101.0 in)
- Length: 4,060 mm (159.8 in)
- Width: 1,800 mm (70.9 in)
- Height: 1,575 mm (62.0 in)

Chronology
- Predecessor: Soul EV/e-Soul (Europe)

The Kia EV2 is a battery electric subcompact car / supermini car produced by South Korean automaker Kia since 2026.

It is the sixth model in the manufacturer's "EV" battery electric car lineup, and the Kia's fourth dedicated electric vehicle to feature the 400-volt architecture after the EV4.

== Development ==
=== Concept ===
The EV2 was first introduced as a concept car on 27 February 2025, alongside the EV4 and PV5.

It is positioned as a battery electric subcompact car, also known in European classification as a “supermini car”, that slots under the EV3. It is similar in size to the Hyundai Inster. The concept model features suicide doors. The Star Map front lighting from the EV9 is also present on the concept. Inside, there is a panoramic glass roof, colour-coordinated headrest speakers, and a metal-accented dashboard housing a wide touchscreen.

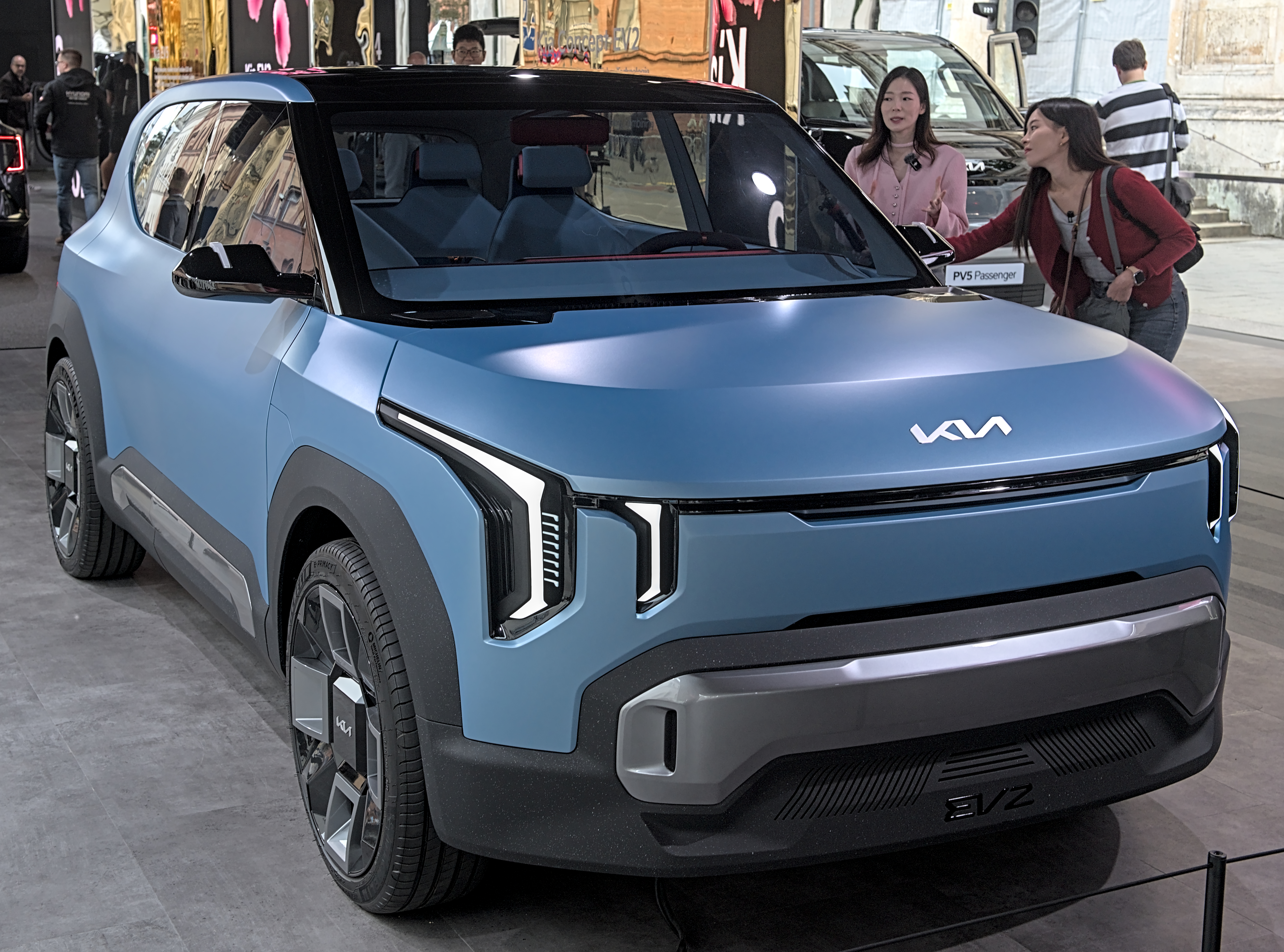
EV2 Concept Front view

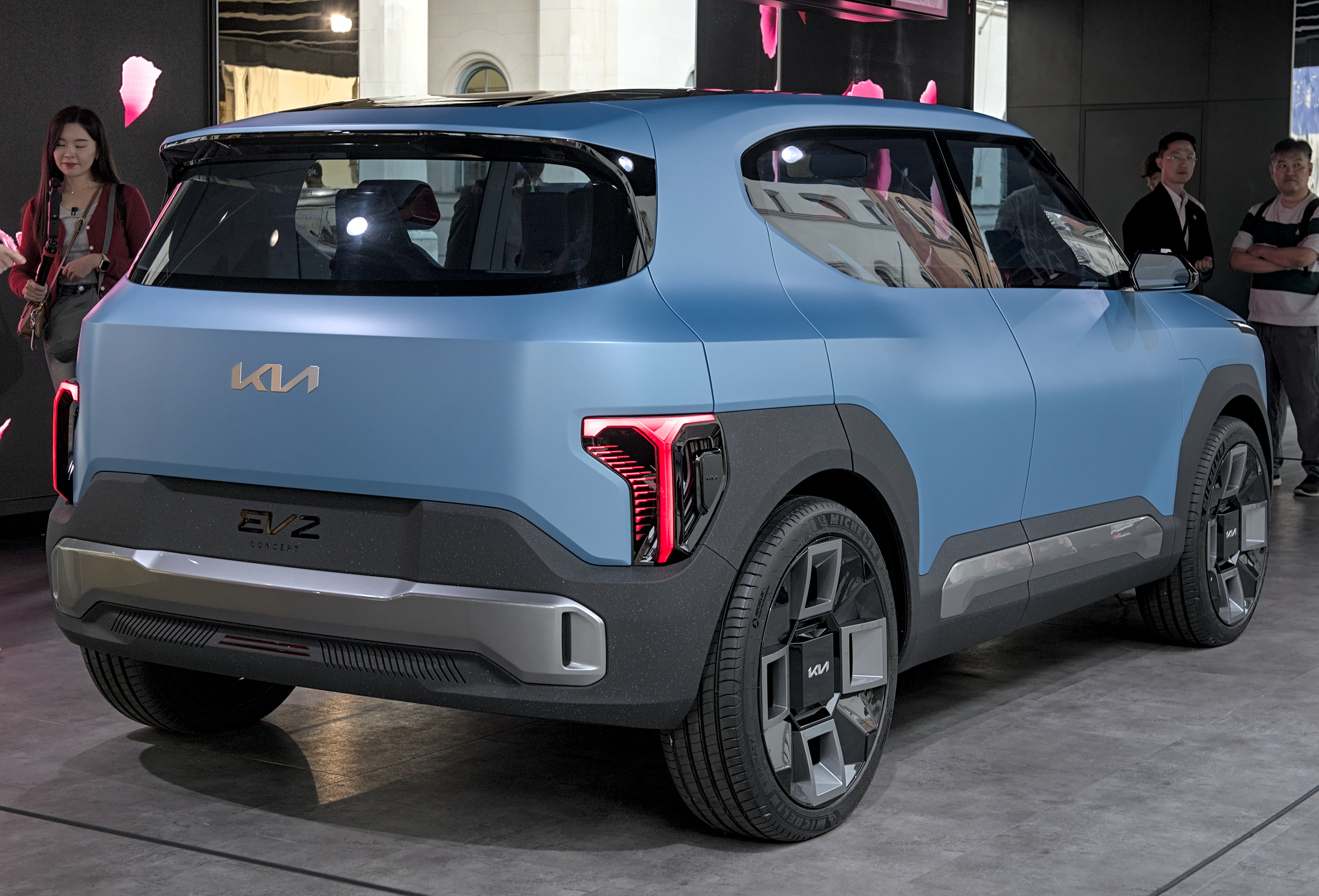
EV2 Concept Rear view

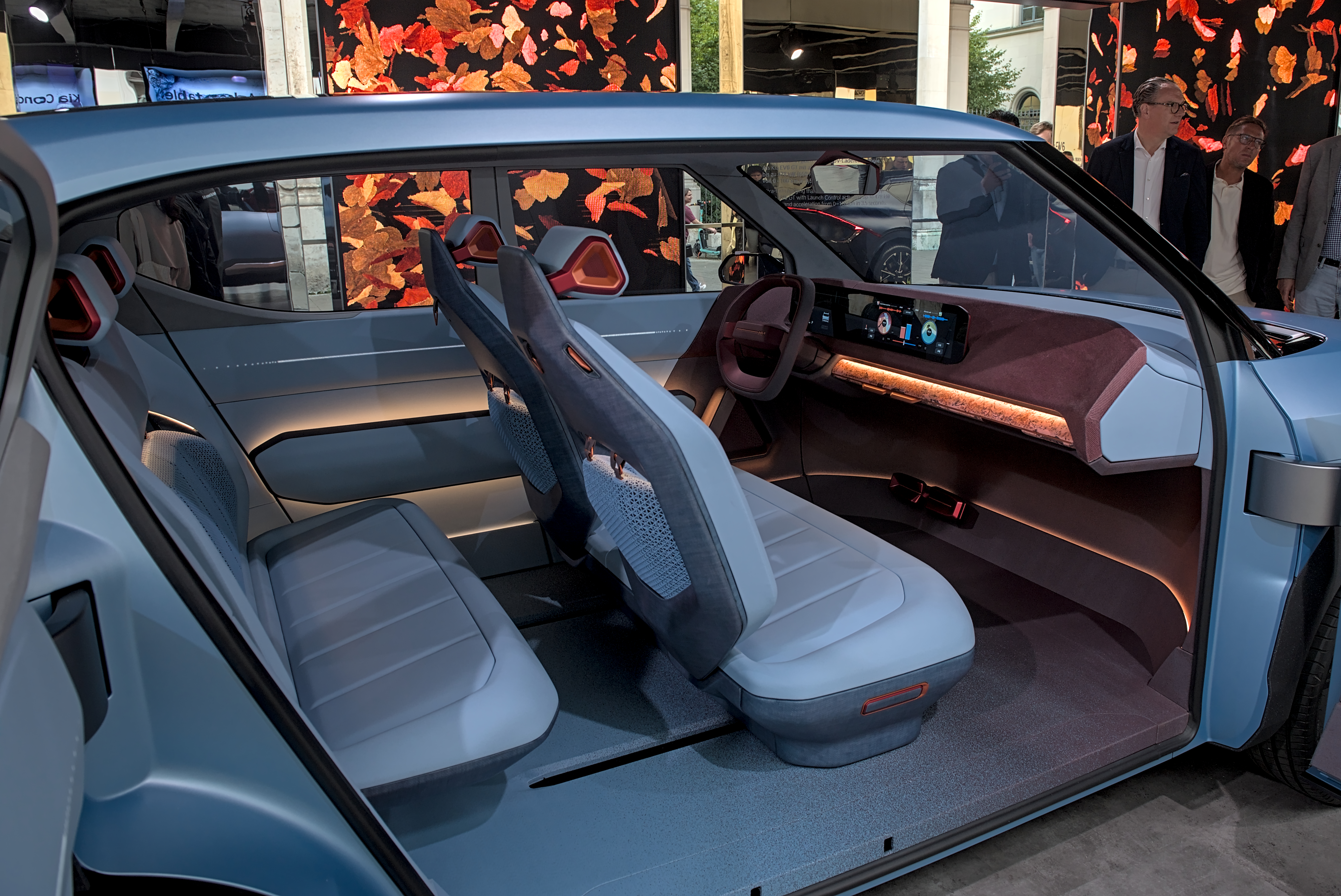
EV2 Concept Interior

=== Production model ===
A year later, on 9 January 2026, Kia unveiled the production-spec EV2 at the 2026 Brussels Motor Show, and it stays true to the concept model.

=== Successor ===
The EV2 is the successor to the Soul EV, also known in Europe as the e-Soul, which was produced from 2014 to 2024, and it fills the gap in the lineup as Kia's electric subcompact vehicle.

== Overview ==
=== Design and features ===
==== Exterior ====
The production-spec EV2 closely resembles the concept car, carrying over most design elements, including the dual headlights and low taillights. It has some inspiration from the Soul, such as its boxcar shape, size, crossover-like styling, and a similar front-wheel-drive layout.

==== Interior ====
Inside the EV2, it is offered with two seating arrangements — a five-seat version, or a four-seat version featuring sliding rear seats. A triple-screen infotainment setup is used, featuring dual 12.3-inch driver and central displays and a 5.3-inch climate control display in between.

=== Powertrains ===
The EV2 is based on the E-GMP 400V architecture, with two battery choices available: 42.2 kWh and 61 kWh units that provide up to 197 and 278 miles of WLTP range, respectively. It can charge from 10% to 80% in 30 minutes and supports home AC 11kW or 22kW slow charging.

Rear view

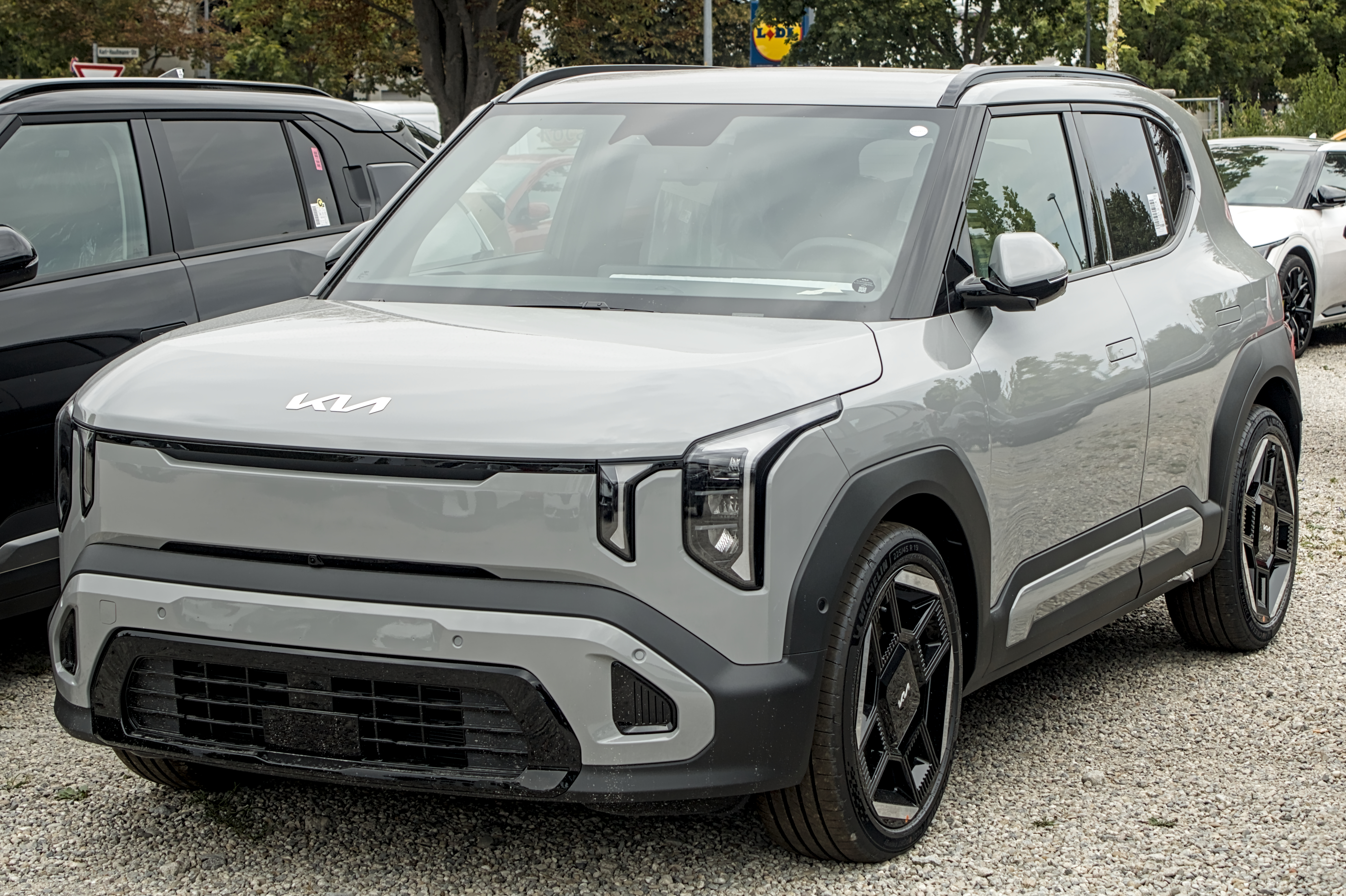
EV2 GT-Line

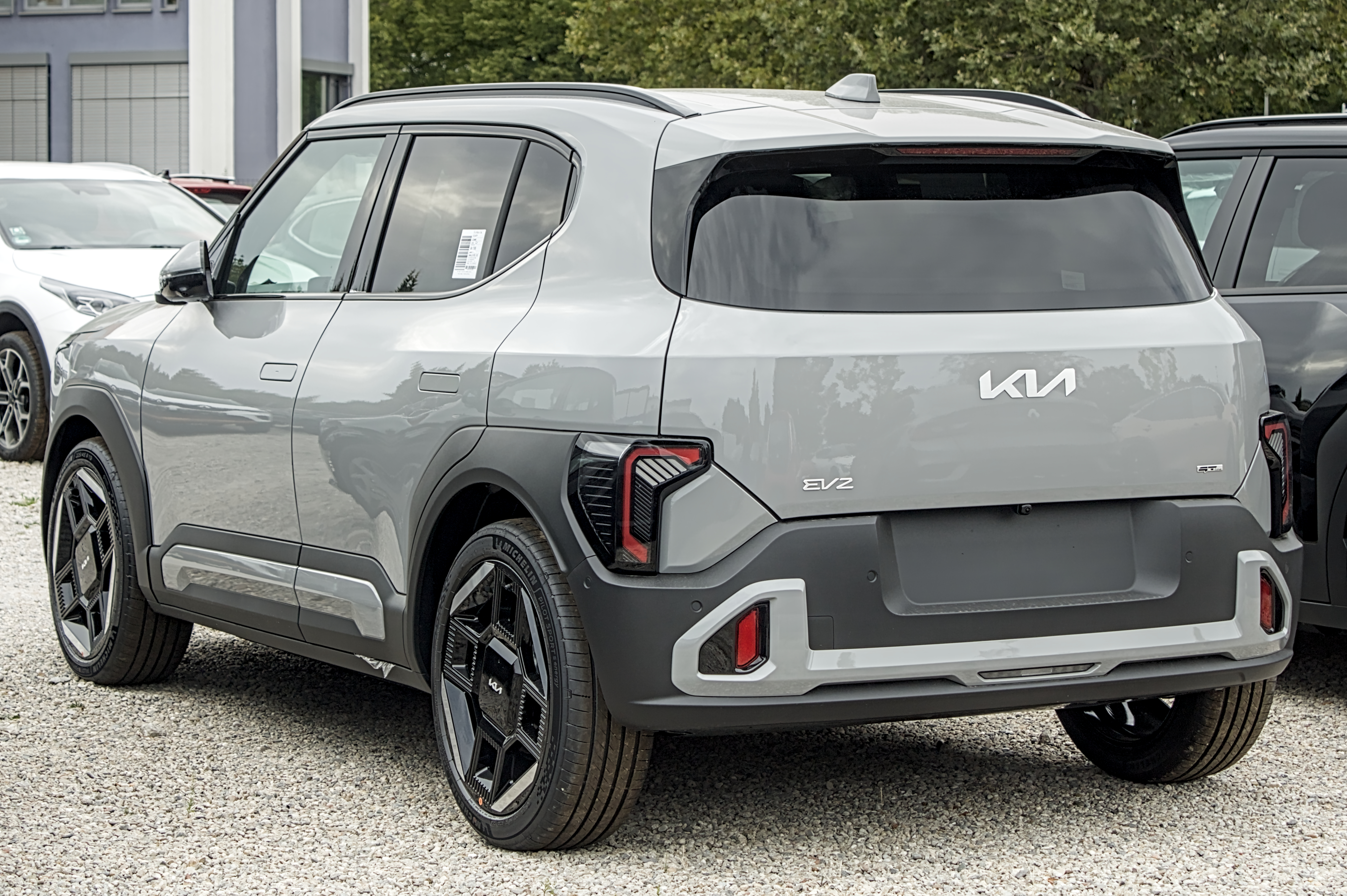
Rear view (GT-Line)

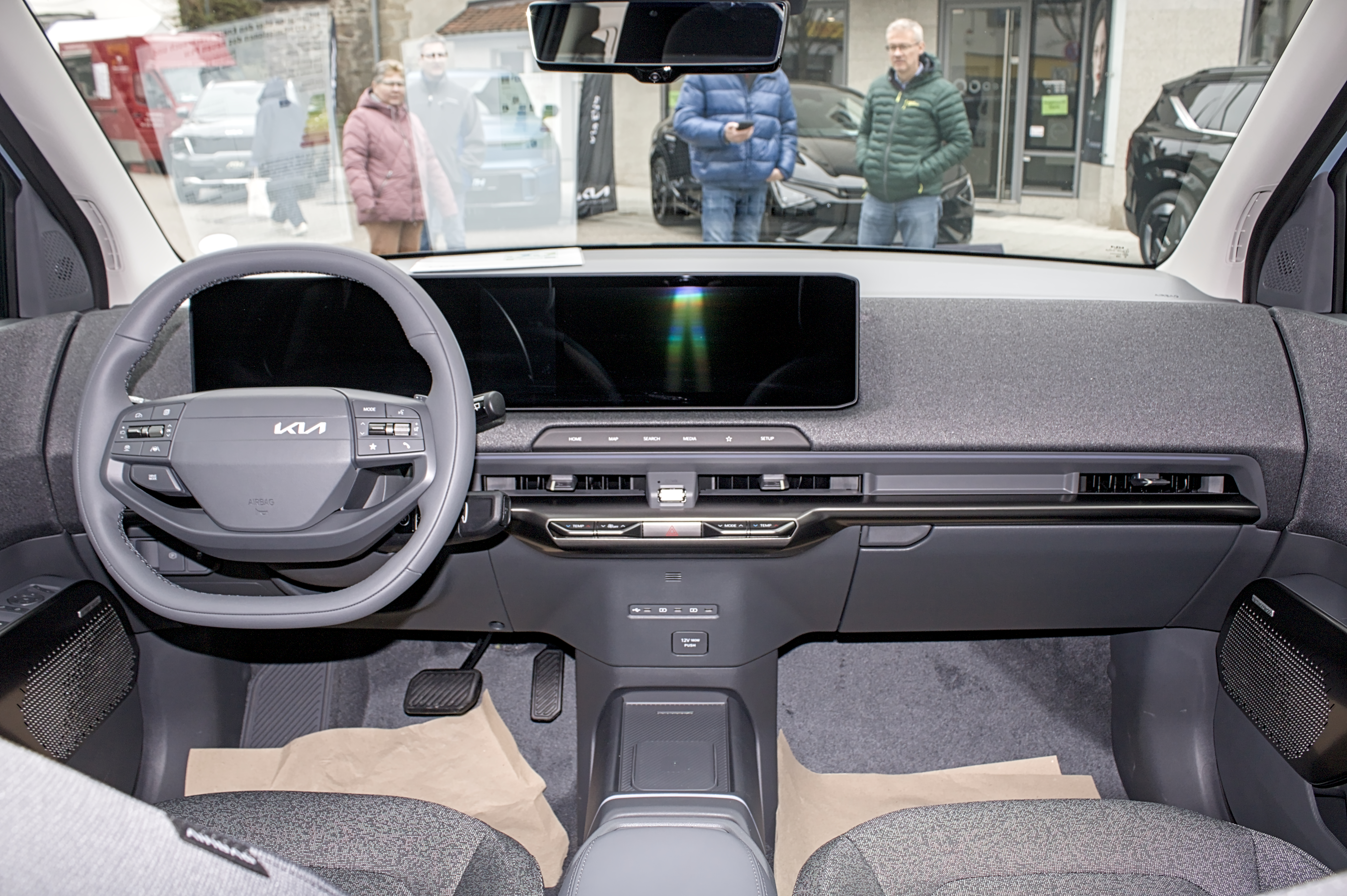
Interior

=== Grades ===
The EV2 is offered in four different trim levels; Light, Air, Earth, and GT-Line.

=== Safety ===
Euro NCAP test results Kia EV2 (2026)
Test	Score
Overall:	5 /5 stars
Safe driving	66%
Crash avoidance	74%
Crash protection	89%
Post crash	86%

== Production and availability ==
=== Factory plant ===
Unlike its predecessor, the Soul EV, the EV2 is produced at the Kia Motors Slovakia plant in Žilina, Slovakia, as the second battery electric vehicle from Kia that is being assembled in Europe after the hatchback-styled EV4.

Production commenced on 27 March 2026.

=== Markets ===
Like the hatchback-styled EV4, the EV2 is being exclusively sold in Europe.

Sales in the European market began on the same date as the vehicle's production commenced.
