= Korea Car of the Year =

Annual automotive award in Korea

Car of the Year
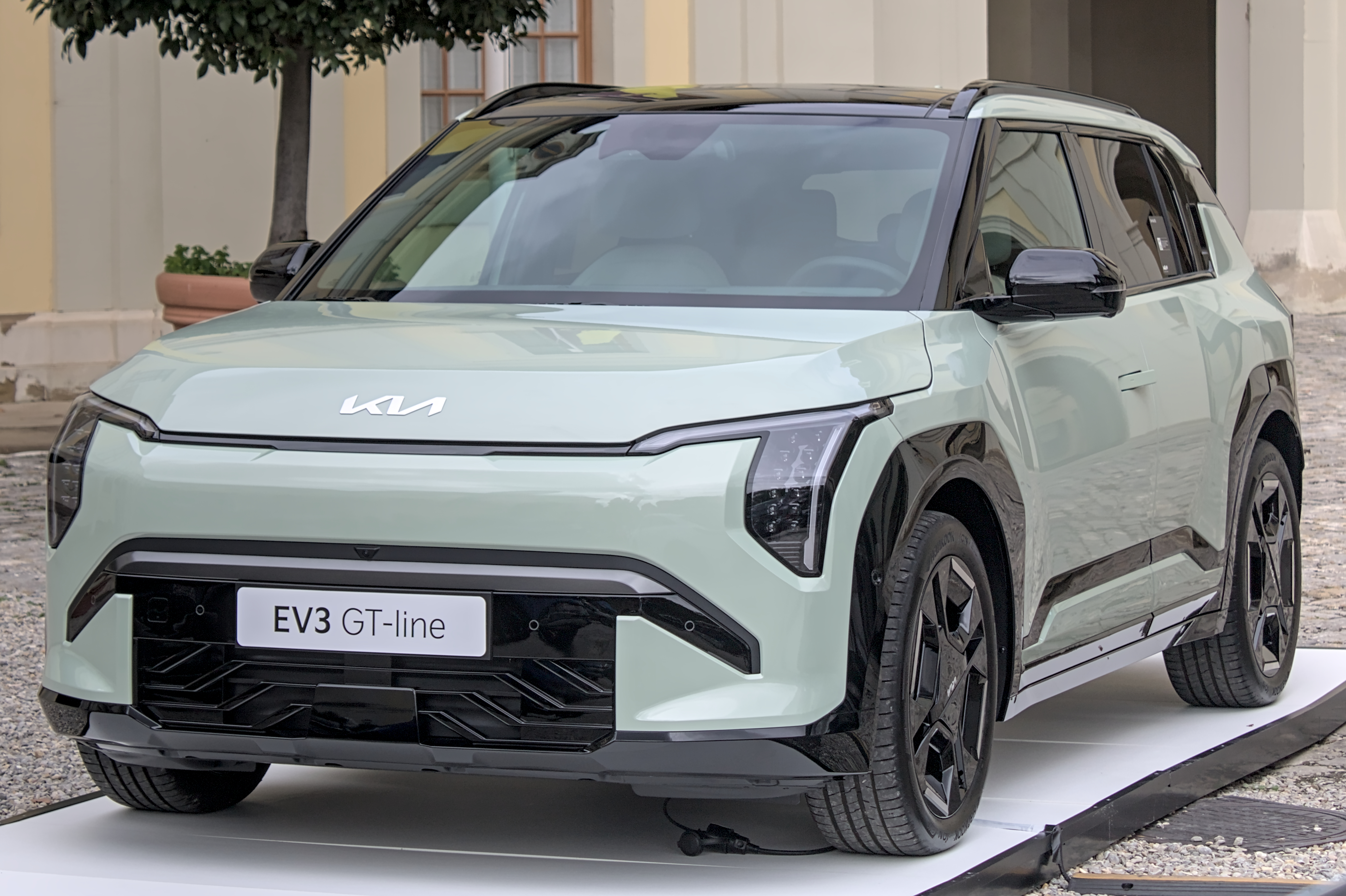
- 2025 winner, Kia EV3
- Formation: 2011
- Website: www.kaja.org/50

The Korea Car of the Year (Korean: 대한민국 올해의 차) is an annual Car of the Year award given for newly released or redesigned vehicles released in the car buying market in South Korea.

== Recipients ==
=== Korea Car of the Year ===
| Year | Winner |
|---|---|
| 2011 | Kia K5 |
| 2012 | Hyundai i40 |
| 2013 | Toyota Camry |
| 2014 | Hyundai Genesis |
| 2015 | Kia Carnival |
| 2016 | Genesis EQ900 |
| 2017 | Hyundai Grandeur |
| 2018 | Genesis G70 |
| 2019 | Hyundai Palisade |
| 2020 | Kia K5 |
| 2021 | Genesis G80 |
| 2022 | Genesis G90 |
| 2023 | Hyundai Grandeur |
| 2024 | Hyundai Ioniq 5 N |
| 2025 | Kia EV3 |

- Underlining indicates the vehicle won the World Car Awards.

=== Korea Import Car of the Year ===
| Year | Winner |
|---|---|
| 2016 | Mercedes-Maybach S-Class |
| 2017 | Mercedes-Benz E-Class |
| 2018 | BMW 5 Series |
| 2019 | Mercedes-Benz CLS |
| 2020 | BMW 5 Series |
| 2021 | BMW 5 Series |
| 2022 | Mercedes-Benz EQS |
| 2023 | BMW 7 Series |
| 2024 | BMW 5 Series |
| 2025 | Mercedes-Benz E-Class |

== Most wins by manufacturer ==
| Total wins | Manufacturer |
|---|---|
| 6 | Hyundai |
| 4 | Kia |
| 4 | Genesis |
| 1 | Toyota |

== See also ==
- List of motor vehicle awards
