= Kia EV4 =

Battery electric compact car

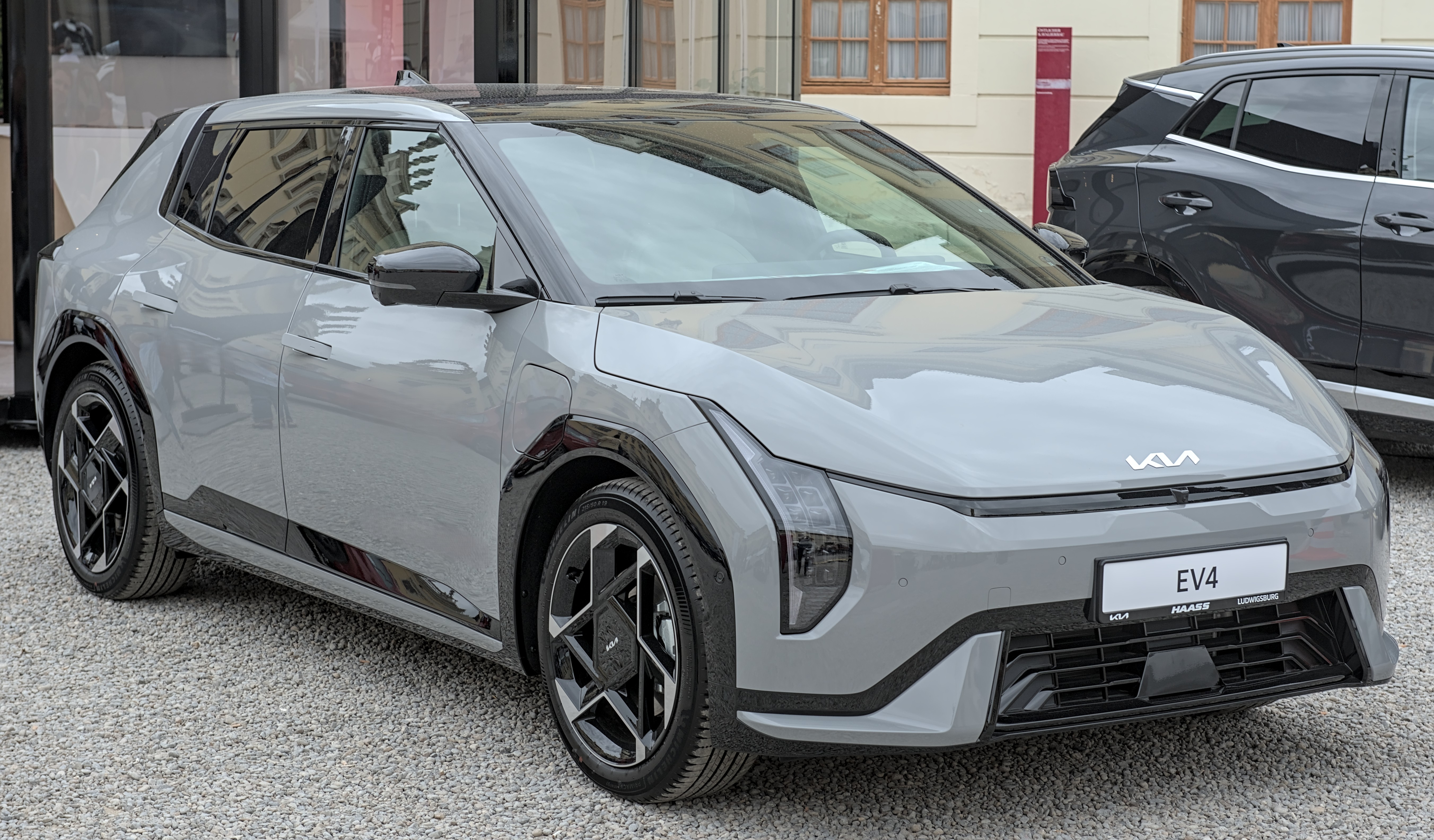

Overview
- Manufacturer: Kia
- Model code: CT
- Production: March 2025 – present
- Model years: 2026 – present
- Assembly: South Korea: Gwangmyeong (Autoland Gwangmyeong, sedan); Slovakia: Žilina (Kia Slovakia, hatchback)
- Designer: Karim Habib

Body and chassis
- Class: Compact car (C)
- Body style: 4-door sedan (Fastback, Europe); 5-door hatchback
- Layout: Front-motor, front-wheel-drive (2025–present); Dual-motor, all-wheel-drive (2026–present)
- Platform: E-GMP (400 V architecture)
- Related: Kia EV3

Powertrain
- Electric motor: Permanent magnet synchronous motor

Dimensions
- Wheelbase: 2,820 mm (111.0 in)
- Length: 4,730 mm (186.2 in) (sedan); 4,450 mm (175.2 in) (hatchback)
- Width: 1,860 mm (73.2 in) (sedan)
- Height: 1,480 mm (58.3 in) (sedan); 1,485 mm (58.5 in) (hatchback)
- Curb weight: 1,900–2,041 kg (4,189–4,500 lb)

The Kia EV4 (Korean: 기아 EV4) is a battery electric (C-segment) compact car produced by Kia since 2025. It is the fifth model in the manufacturer's "EV" electric car line-up, and Kia’s third dedicated electric vehicle to feature the 400-volt architecture after the EV3.

The EV4 Kia’s first non-SUV dedicated electric vehicle, acting as a battery electric counterpart to the K4, and it is offered in both sedan and hatchback forms.

== Overview ==
The EV4 was previewed by the concept car, which was presented on 12 October 2023 during the manufacturer's Kia EV Day event, then exhibited at the LA Auto Show in November.

Two years later, on the first quarter of 2025, it was first revealed on 17 February 2025, and later fully introduced on 27 February 2025 in its production form, which stays true to the concept model, alongside the EV2 and PV5. It is Kia’s first global non-SUV segment model, and it is also available as a hatchback model in Europe.

It features vertical headlamps and Kia's signature star map lighting. The sedan model has a roof spoiler placed on both ends of the rear of the car.

The first row is equipped with a panoramic wide display that includes a 12.3-inch cluster, a 5-inch air conditioning unit, and a 12.3-inch infotainment system. There are hidden touch buttons below the display, but the media power, volume, air conditioning temperature, and wind speed functions are physical buttons. It is the first Kia vehicle to feature a 2-row rotating armrest and over-the-air software update function linked to the Kia mobile app.

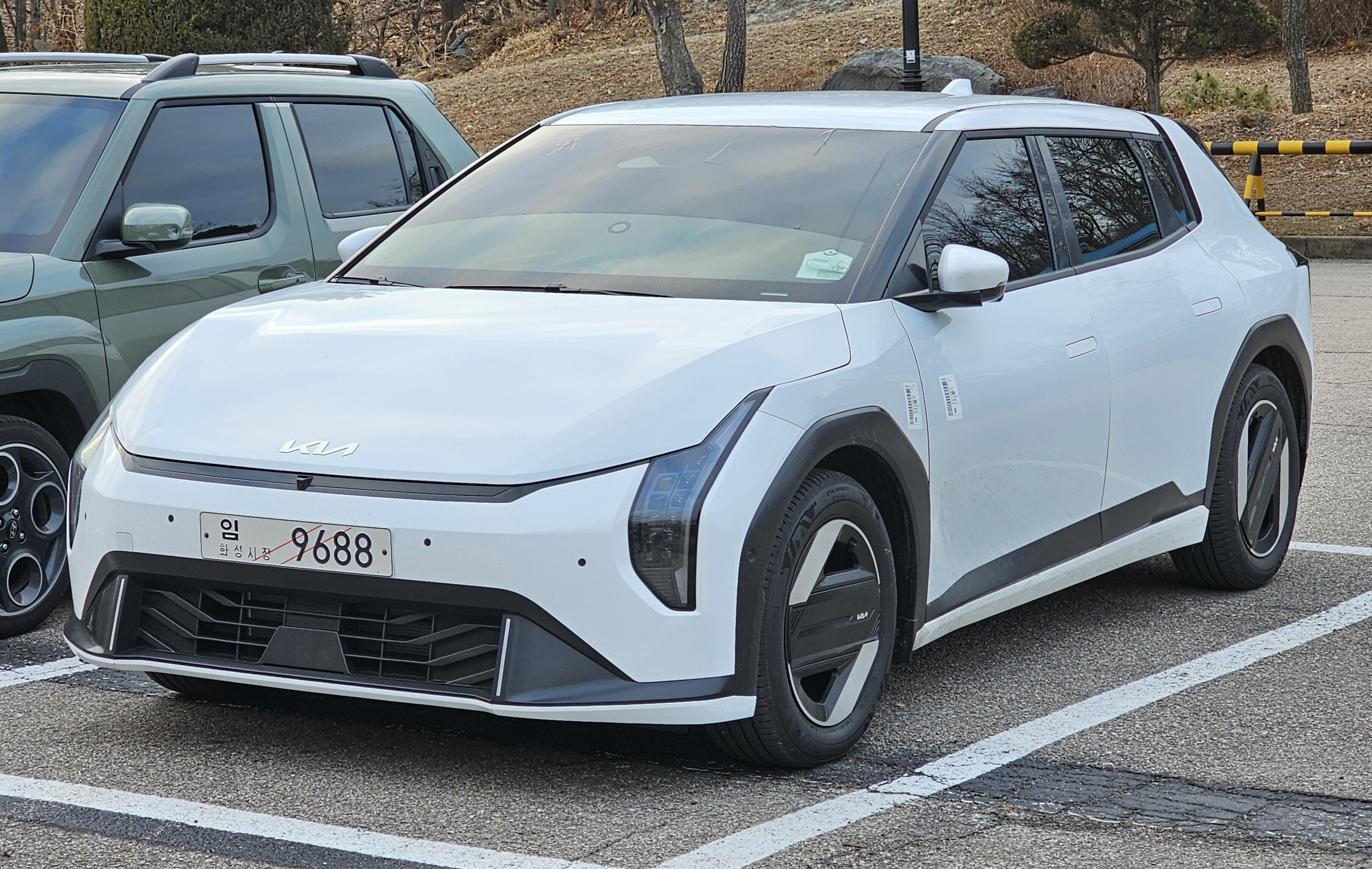
Kia EV4 hatchback (front)

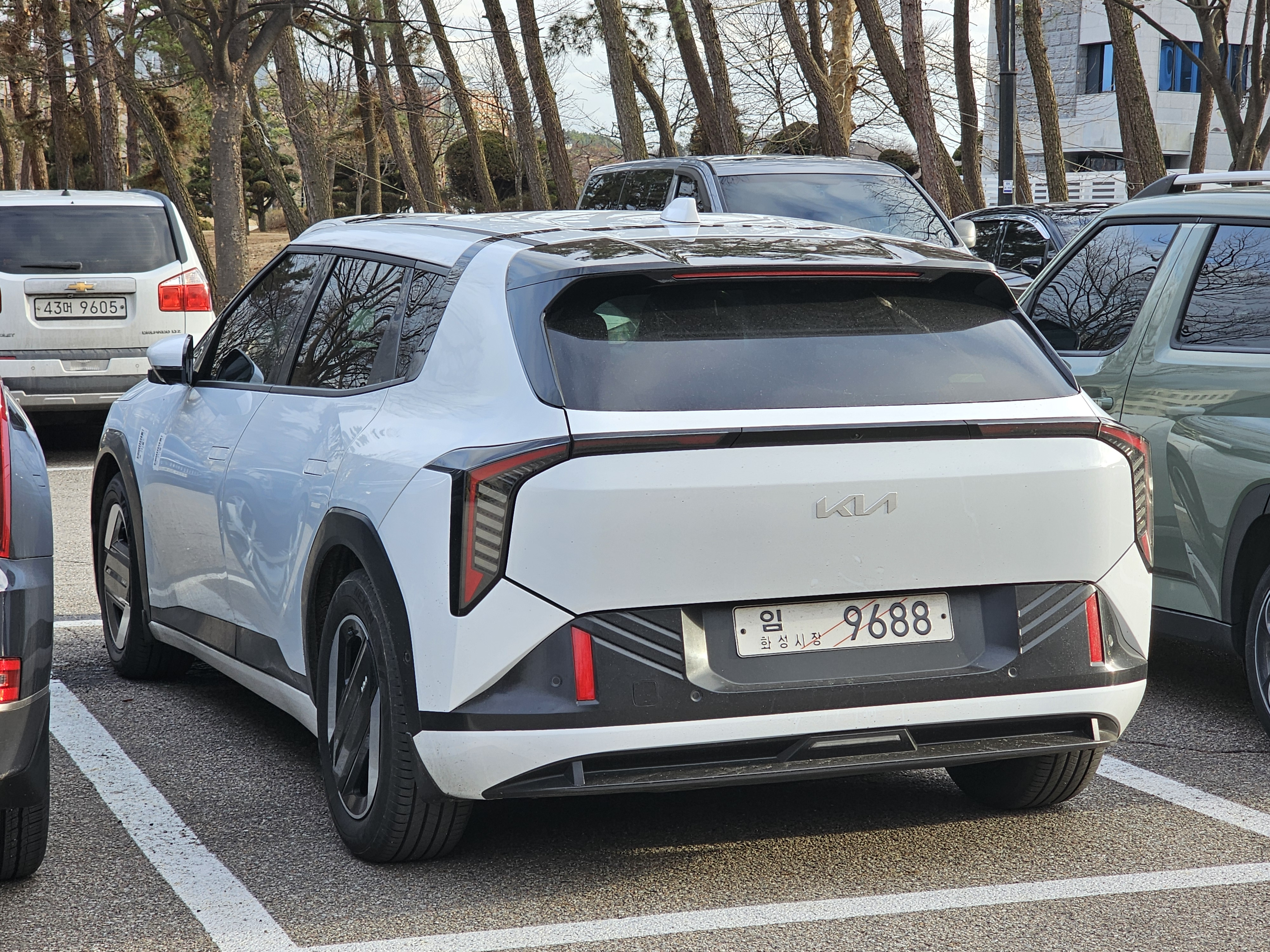
Kia EV4 hatchback (rear)

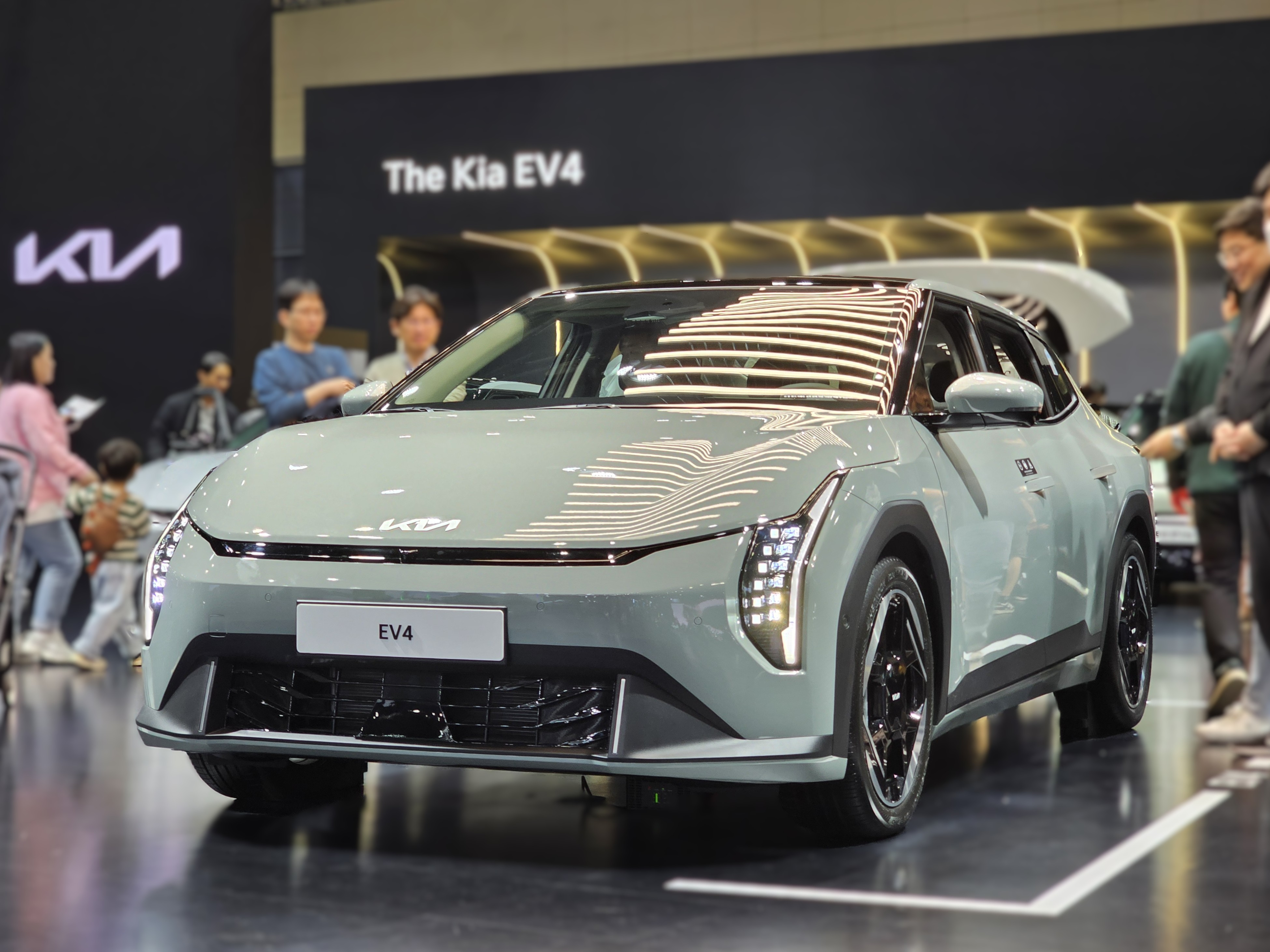
Kia EV4 sedan (front)

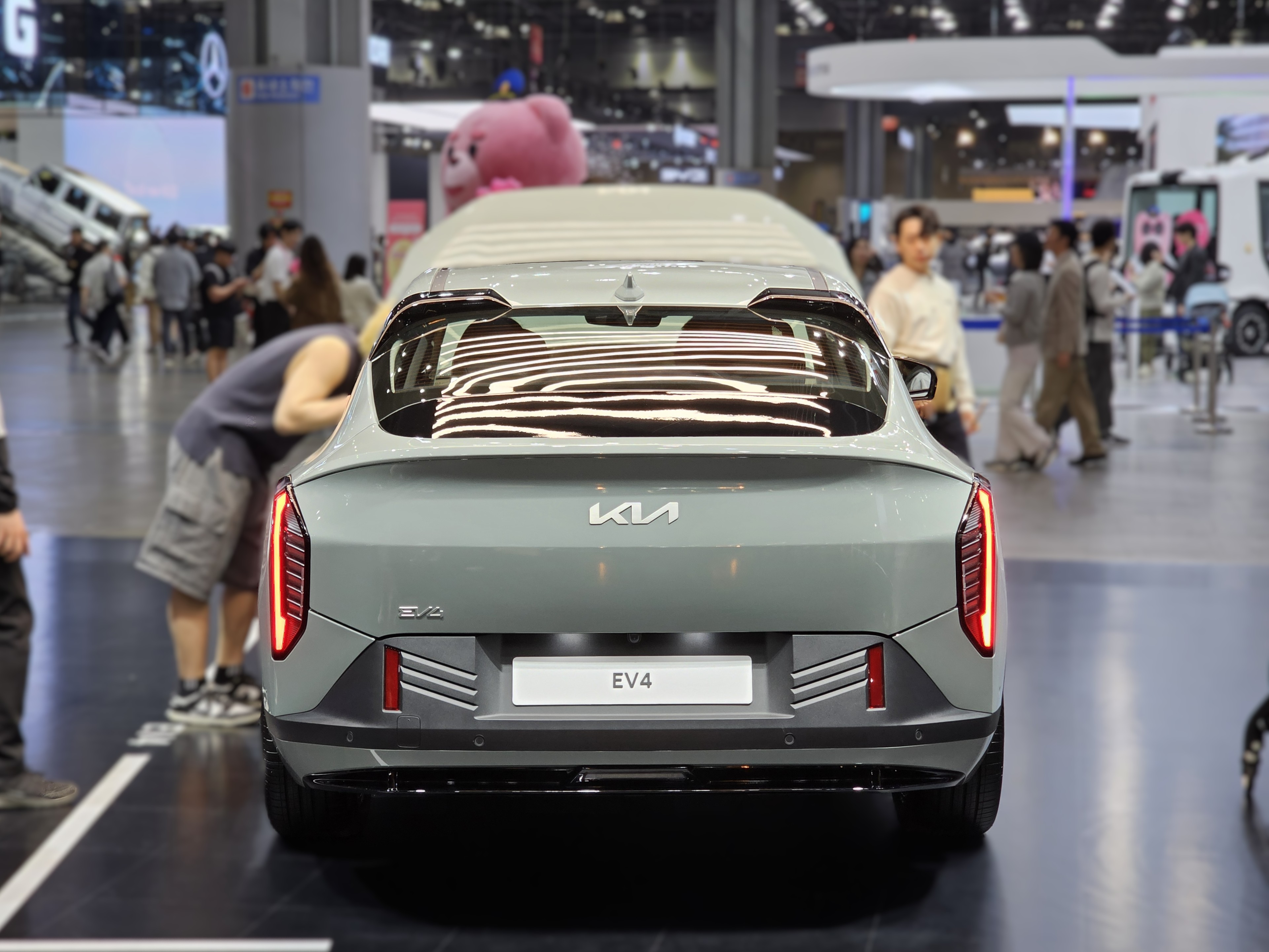
Kia EV4 sedan (rear)

=== GT-Line ===
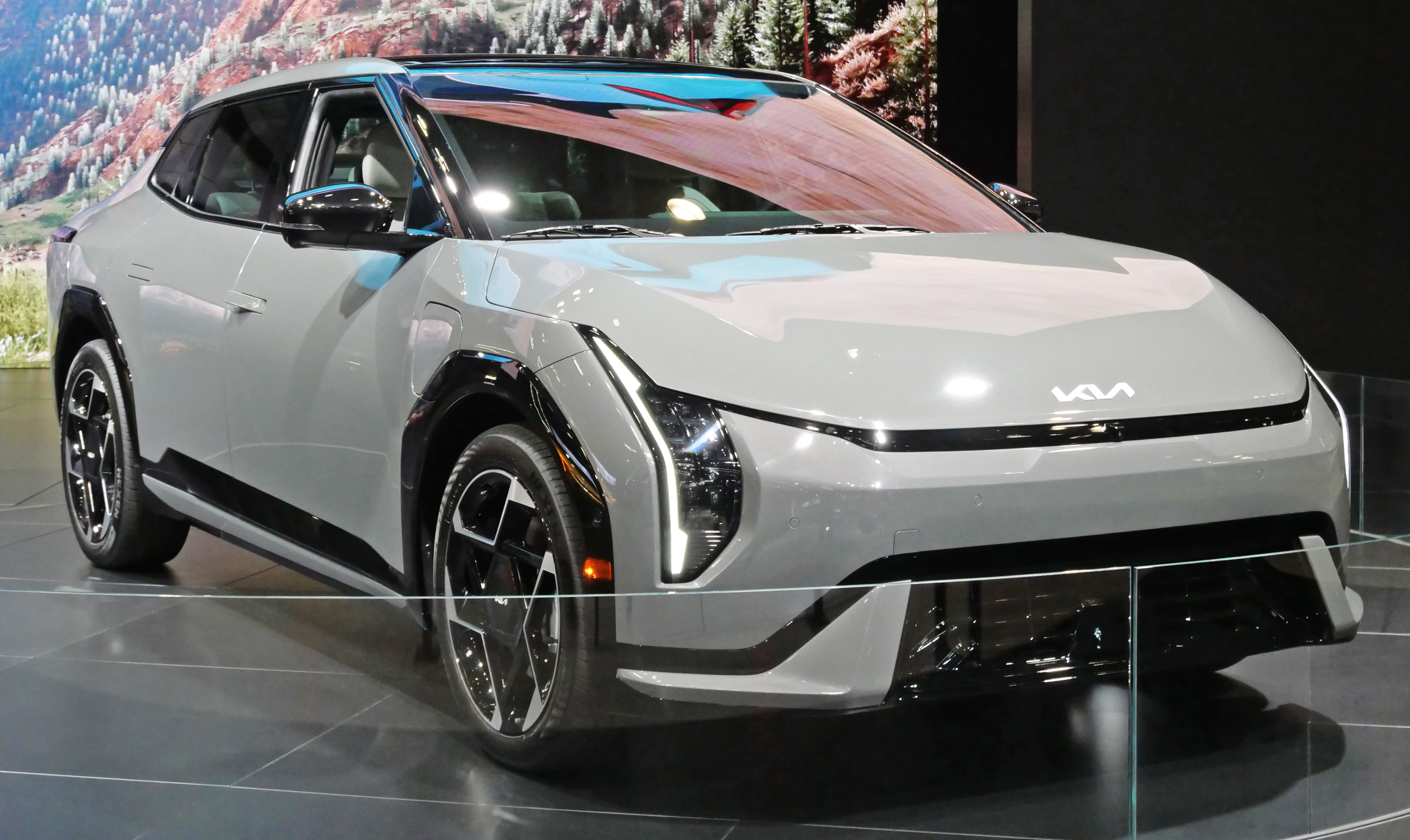
GT-Line sedan (front)

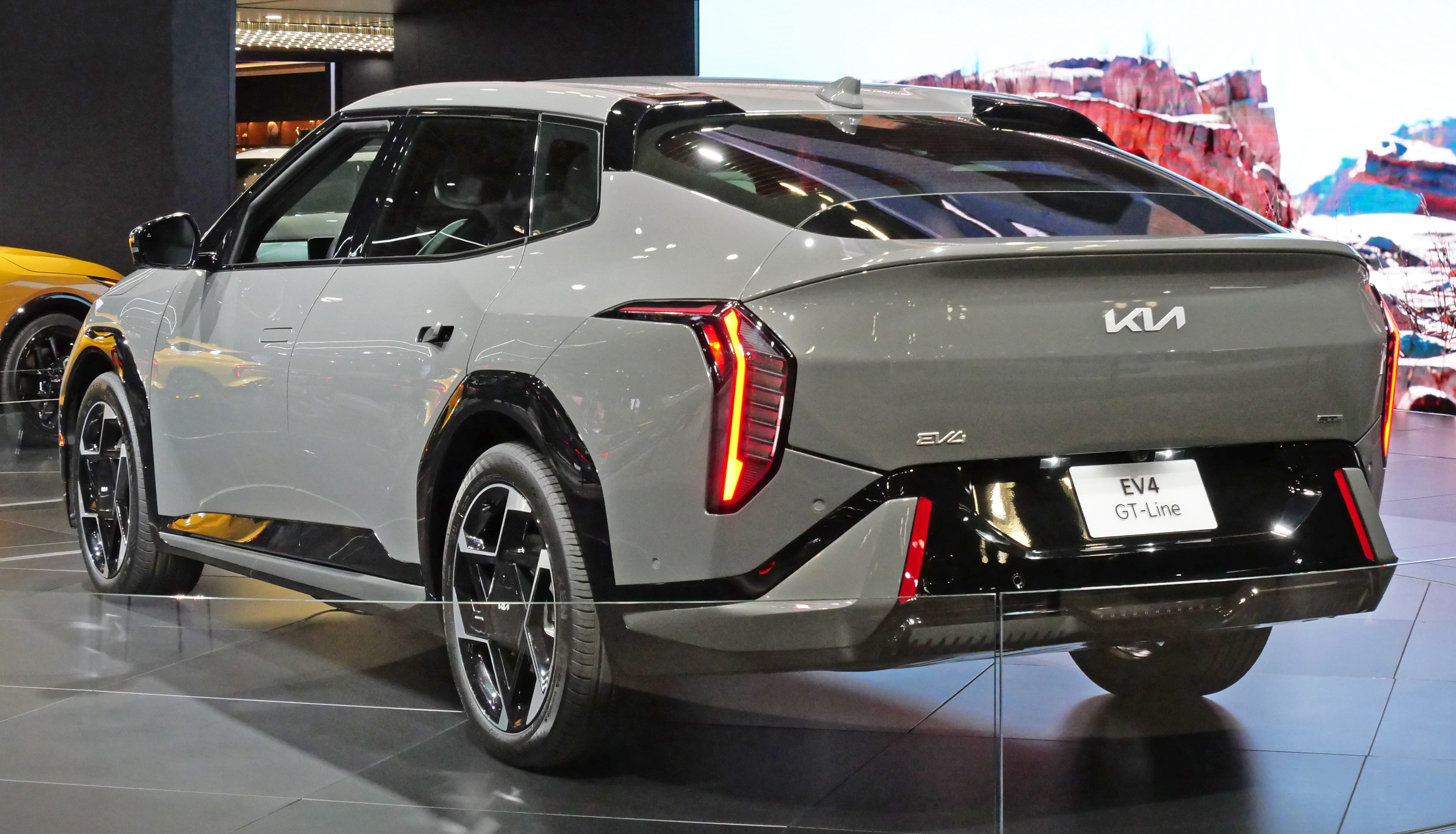
GT-Line sedan (rear)

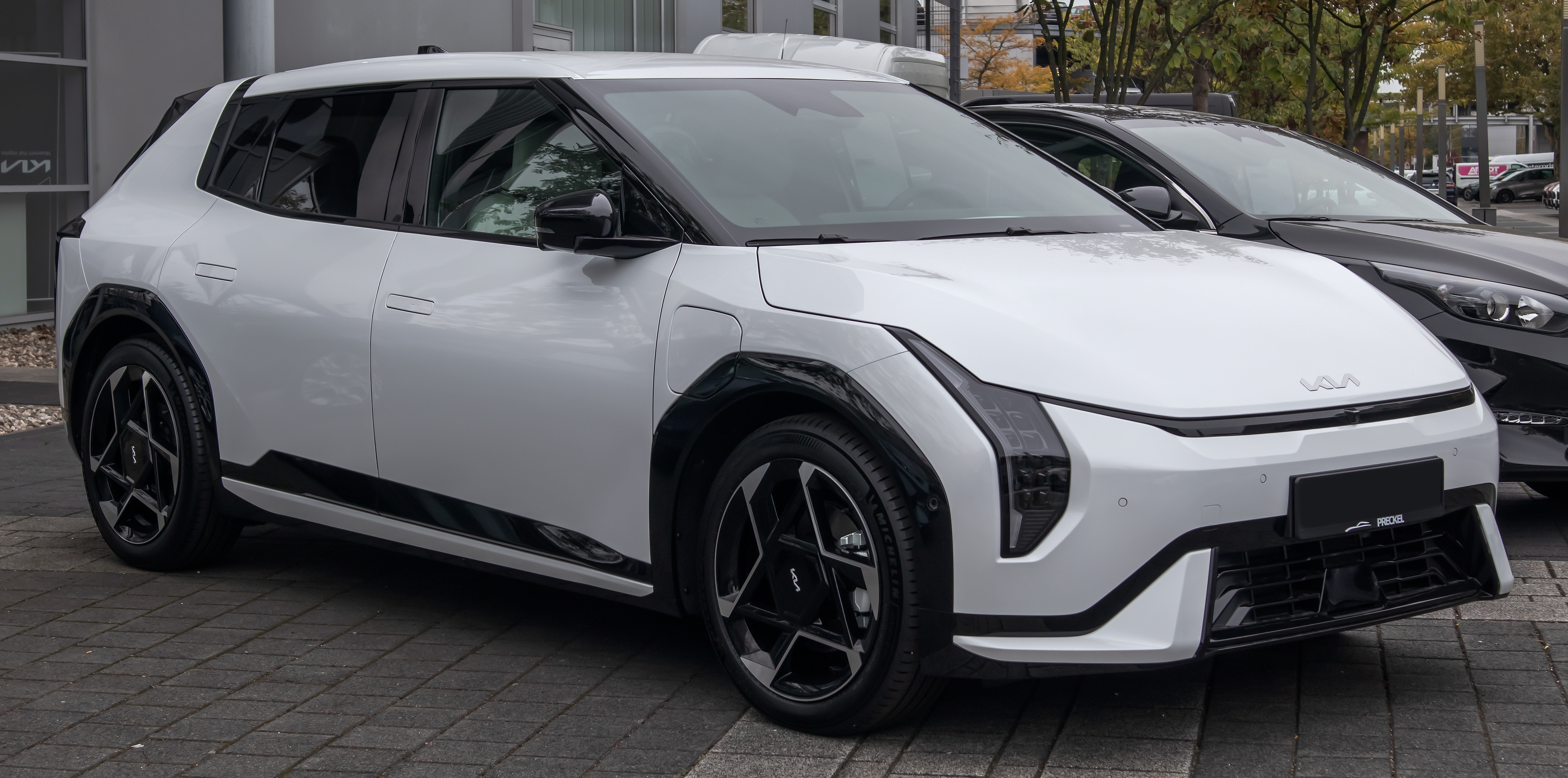
GT-Line hatchback (front)

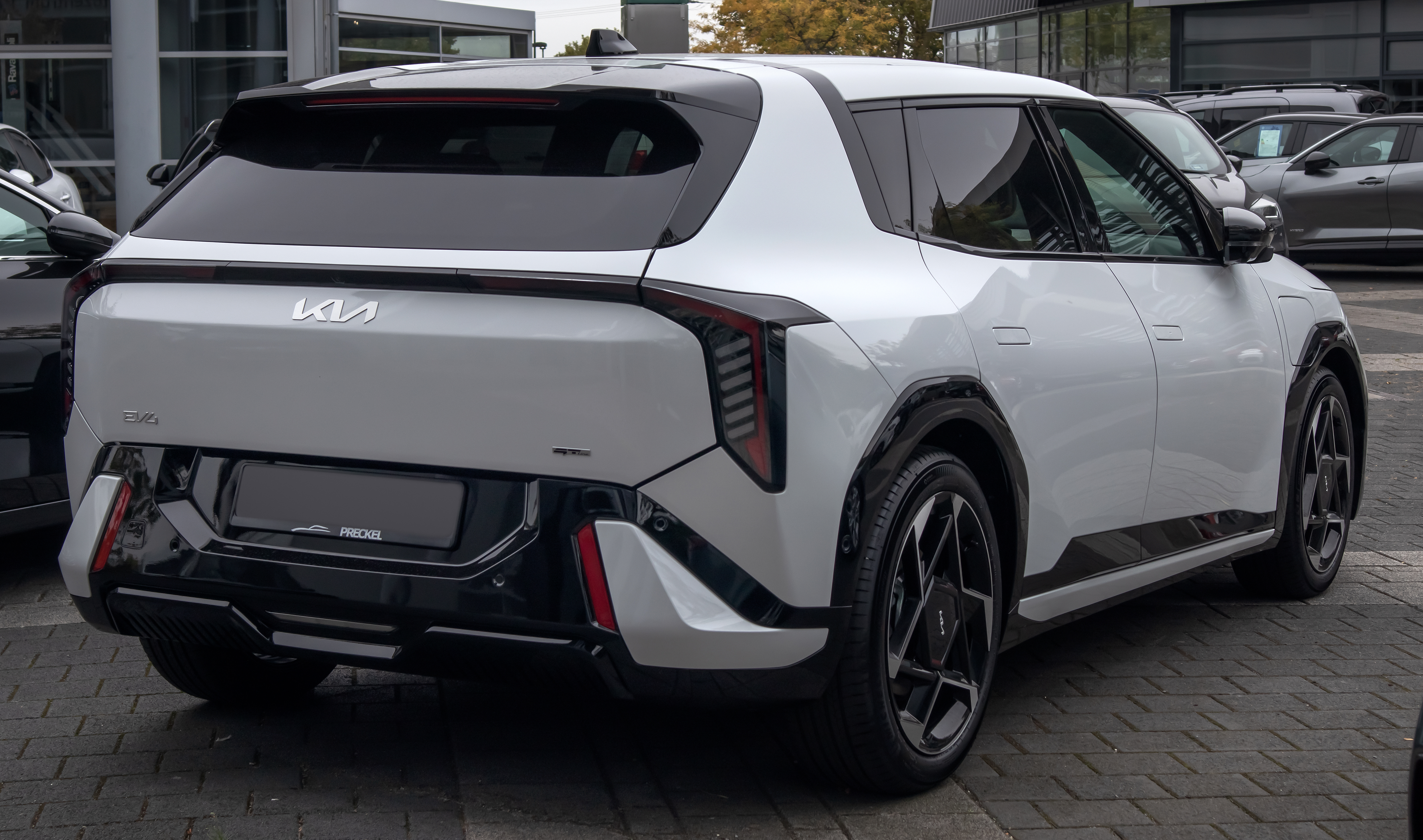
GT-Line hatchback (rear)

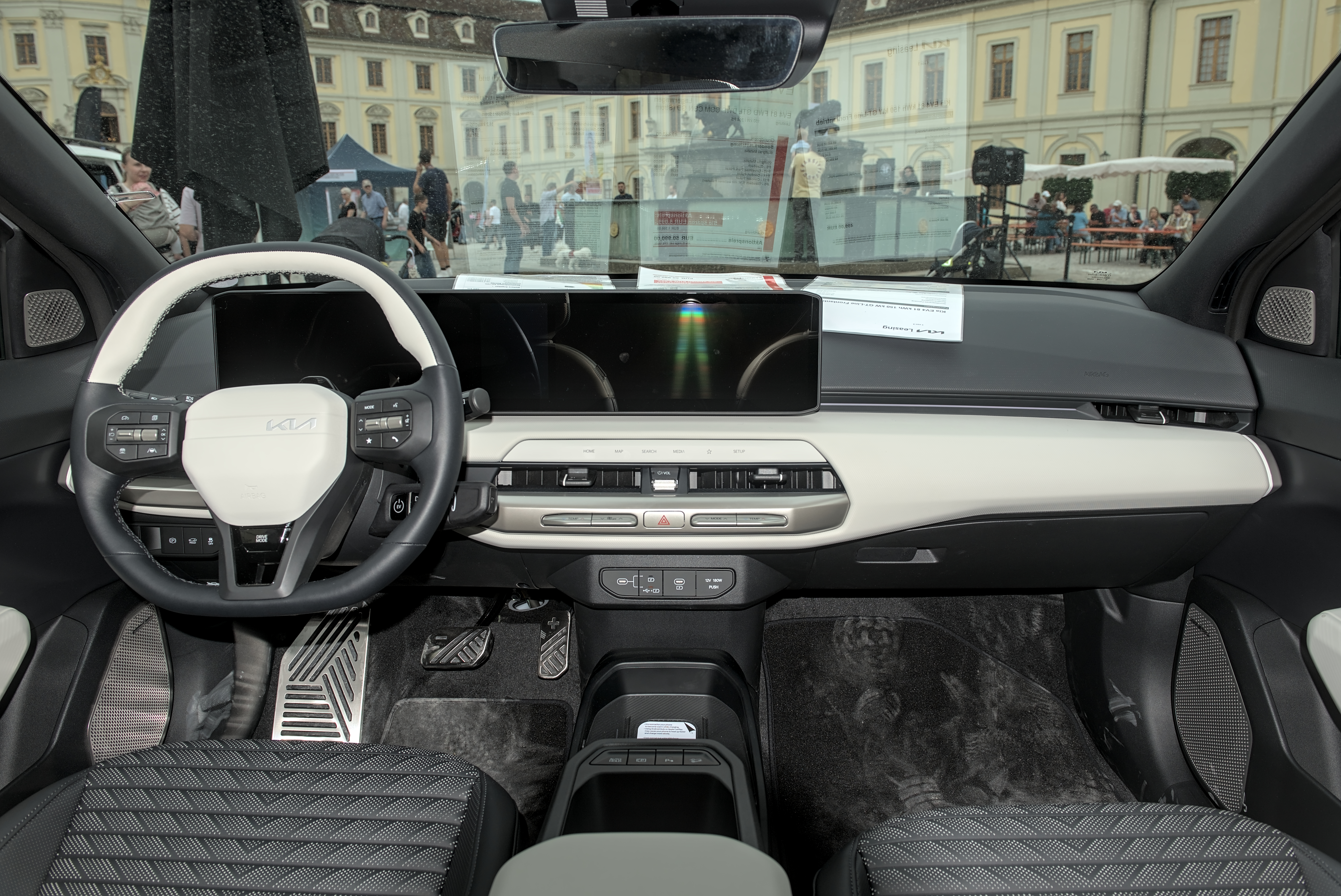
Interior

=== EV4 GT ===
The EV4 GT was released on 9 January 2026; it is a high-performance version of the EV4, and it offers all-wheel-drive.

Like the standard and GT-Line variants, the EV4 GT is offered in both sedan and hatchback forms.

== Production ==
The Kia EV4 in both sedan and hatchback forms are being produced in two different factory plants.

The sedan model is produced at Autoland Gwangmyeong in Gwangmyeong, South Korea, while the hatchback model is produced at Kia Motors Slovakia plant in Žilina, Slovakia.

Production of the sedan model in South Korea first rolled out in March 2025 alonngside the vehicle's launch in its home market.

On 19 August 2025, the hatchback version of the EV4 commenced production at the Kia Motors Slovakia plant in Žilina, Slovakia, as the first battery electric vehicle from Kia to be assembled in Europe. The Slovakia plant is the manufacturing plant, where the hatchback-styled EV4 is produced, and it is exclusively sold in Europe.

== Markets ==
=== Europe ===
The EV4 is offered in the European market as a sedan and hatchback, in both standard and GT-Line forms.

=== Korea ===
Kia began accepting orders for the EV4 sedan in its home market of South Korea in March 2025, and sales commenced a month later in April of the same year. It is available with three trim levels: Air, Earth and GT Line, with Standard Range and Long Range powertrain options.

In May of the same year, the EV4 became the best-selling battery electric car in its home market, with 1,373 units sold during the month.

=== North America ===
USDM Prototype (2025 NYC Auto Show) – Cancelled indefinitely

The EV4 was introduced in North America on 16 April 2025 at the 2025 New York International Auto Show, only shown as a sedan.

Initially, it was slated to arrive in both the U.S. and Canada as an all-electric alternative to the K4 in early 2026.

However, in the end of October 2025, Kia delayed the U.S. market launch of the EV4 indefinitely due to the ongoing tariffs and the loss of the federal tax credit. In Canada, the EV4 went on sale in the same scheduled date.

=== Oceania ===
==== Australia ====
The EV4 was launched in Australia on 19 January 2026, only offered as a sedan, with three variants: Air Standard Range, Earth Long Range, and GT-Line Long Range. A month later on February of the same year, the hatchback was still under consideration, with a final decision yet to be confirmed.

==== New Zealand ====
Pricing for the EV4 in New Zealand was announced on 2 October 2025 with two variants: Light (Air in other markets) Long Range 2WD, and GT-Line 2WD. Like in Australia, it is only offered as a sedan.

=== Singapore ===
The EV4 was launched in Singapore on 12 January 2026, in the sole variant using the 58.3 kWh battery pack.

== Safety ==
ANCAP test results Kia EV4 (2025, aligned with Euro NCAP)
Test	Points	%
Overall:	5 /5 stars	
Adult occupant:	33.92	84%
Child occupant:	42.53	86%
Pedestrian:	49.13	77%
Safety assist:	14.64	81%

Euro NCAP test results Kia EV4 (2025)
Test	Points	%
Overall:	4 /5 stars	
Adult occupant:	33.9	84%
Child occupant:	41.7	85%
Pedestrian:	48.6	77%
Safety assist:	12.2	67%

Euro NCAP test results Kia EV4 with DriveWise ADAS Pack (2025)
Test	Points	%
Overall:	5 /5 stars	
Adult occupant:	33.9	84%
Child occupant:	41.7	85%
Pedestrian:	49.1	77%
Safety assist:	14.1	78%

Latin NCAP 3.5 test results Kia EV4 + 6 Airbags (2025, similar to Euro NCAP 2017)
Test	Points	%
Overall:	5 /5 stars	
Adult occupant:	33.15	83%
Child occupant:	45.00	92%
Pedestrian:	33.23	69%
Safety assist:	42.25	98%
