= Kia EV3 =

Battery electric compact crossover SUV

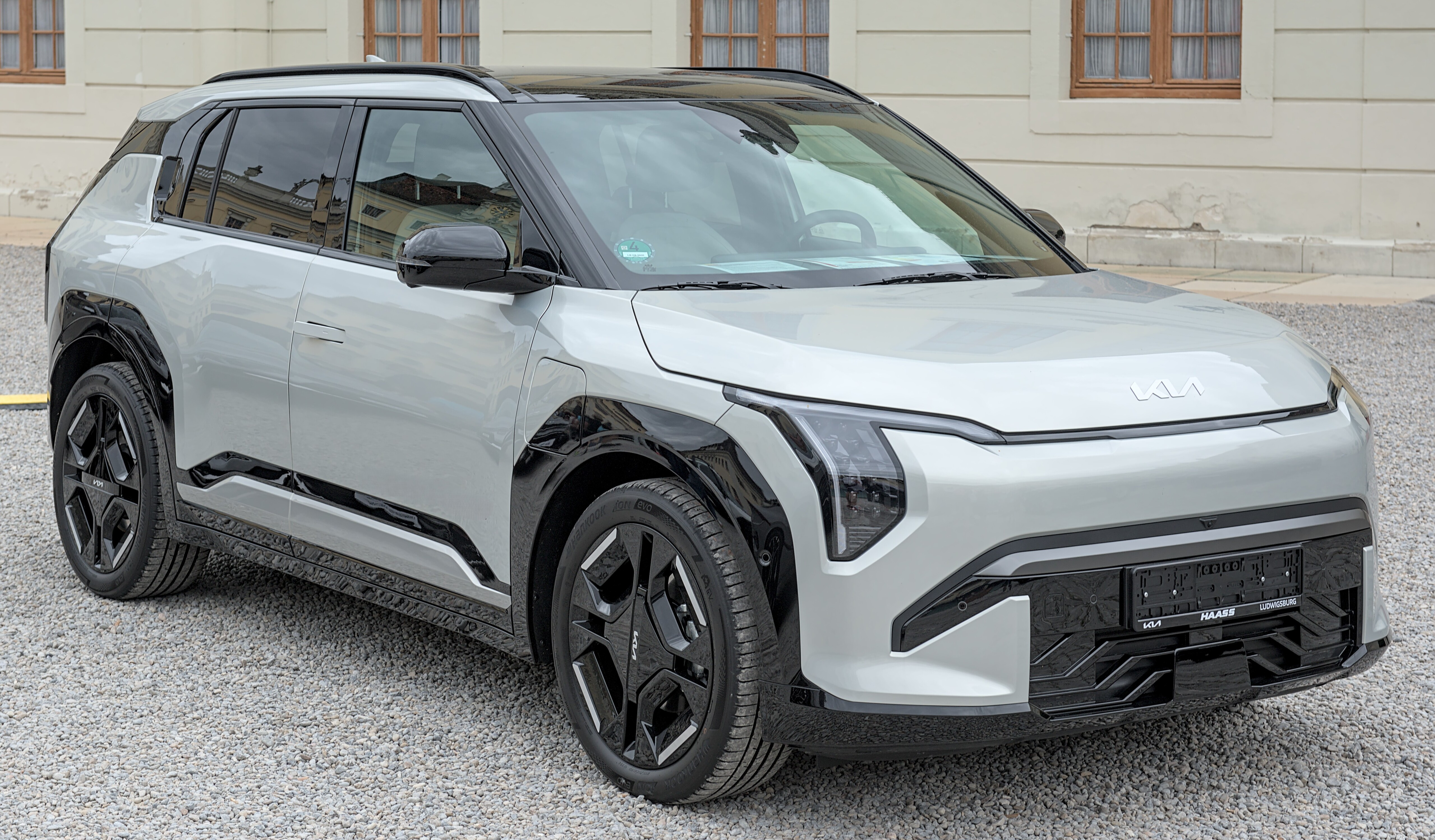

Overview
- Manufacturer: Kia
- Model code: SV
- Production: 2024–present
- Model years: 2027–present
- Assembly: South Korea: Gwangmyeong (Sohari Plant); Mexico: Monterrey, Nuevo León (KMMX)

Body and chassis
- Class: Compact crossover SUV (C)
- Body style: 5-door SUV
- Layout: Front-motor, front-wheel-drive; Dual-motor, all-wheel-drive
- Platform: K3, E-GMP (400 V architecture)
- Related: Kia EV4

Powertrain
- Electric motor: Permanent magnet synchronous motor
- Power output: 150 kW (201 hp; 204 PS) (FWD); 230 kW (308 hp; 313 PS) (AWD)
- Battery: 58.3 kWh NMC lithium-ion; 81.4 kWh NMC lithium-ion
- Electric range: Up to 600 km (373 mi) (WLTP)

Dimensions
- Wheelbase: 2,680 mm (105.5 in)
- Length: 4,300–4,310 mm (169.3–169.7 in)
- Width: 1,850 mm (72.8 in)
- Height: 1,560–1,570 mm (61.4–61.8 in)
- Curb weight: 1,750–1,850 kg (3,858–4,079 lb)

Chronology
- Predecessor: Kia Soul EV (Global); Kia Niro EV (North America)

The Kia EV3 (Korean: 기아 EV3) is a battery electric (C-segment) compact crossover SUV manufactured and marketed by Kia since 2024.

It is the fourth model in the manufacturer's "EV" line-up and Kia’s second dedicated electric vehicle to feature the 400-volt architecture after the EV5.

== Overview ==
The EV3 was previewed by the Kia EV3 Concept car which was presented on 12 October 2023 during the manufacturer's Kia EV Day event, then exhibited at the LA Auto Show in November.

A year later, the production version was unveiled on the 23 May 2024, and sales commenced in July of the same year in South Korea.

The production-spec EV3 is largely inspired by the concept car and shares a few design elements from the larger EV9. It adopts the brand's 'Opposites United' design philosophy with a 'Digital Tiger Face' front fascia and 'Star Map' signature vertical lighting front and rear. Its chassis is derived from the front-wheel-drive Hyundai-Kia K3 platform, and the body structure has been redesigned for battery electric vehicles. Kia markets it as the Electric Global Modular Platform (E-GMP) 400 V architecture.

The interior dashboard has three displays: a 12-inch instrument cluster, a 5-inch touchscreen for the HVAC controls, and a 12-inch touchscreen infotainment system. There are PET materials used throughout the interior and consumers have the option of recycled fabric materials. Other interior features are a 12-inch head-up display (HUD), a sliding table and storage within the centre console, and a “fold-back relaxation mode” for the front seats.

The EV3 has a 460 L (16 cu ft) boot space which features a two-tier boot floor with over 140mm of flexibility and a frunk storage compartment of 25 L (0.88 cu ft).

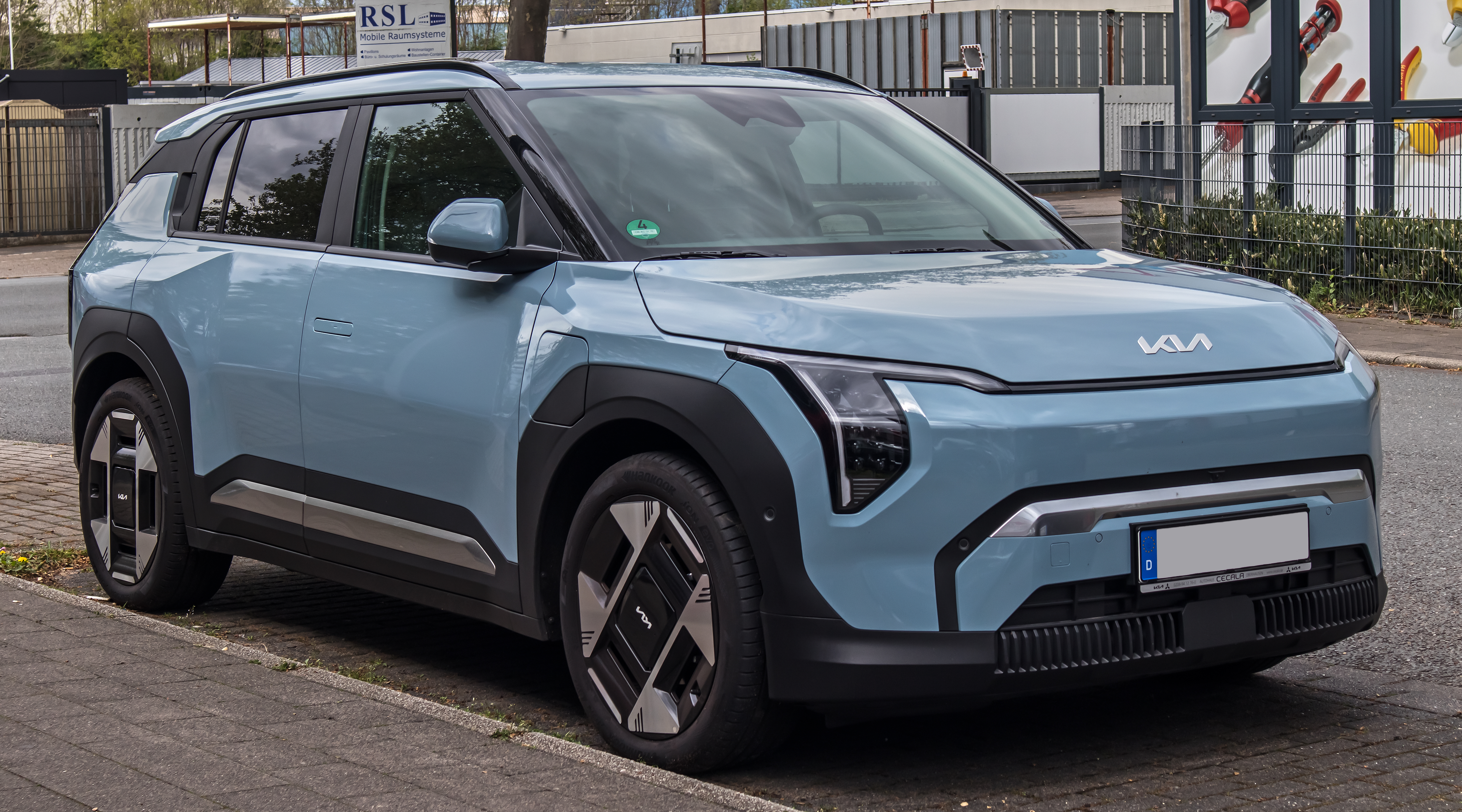
Front view

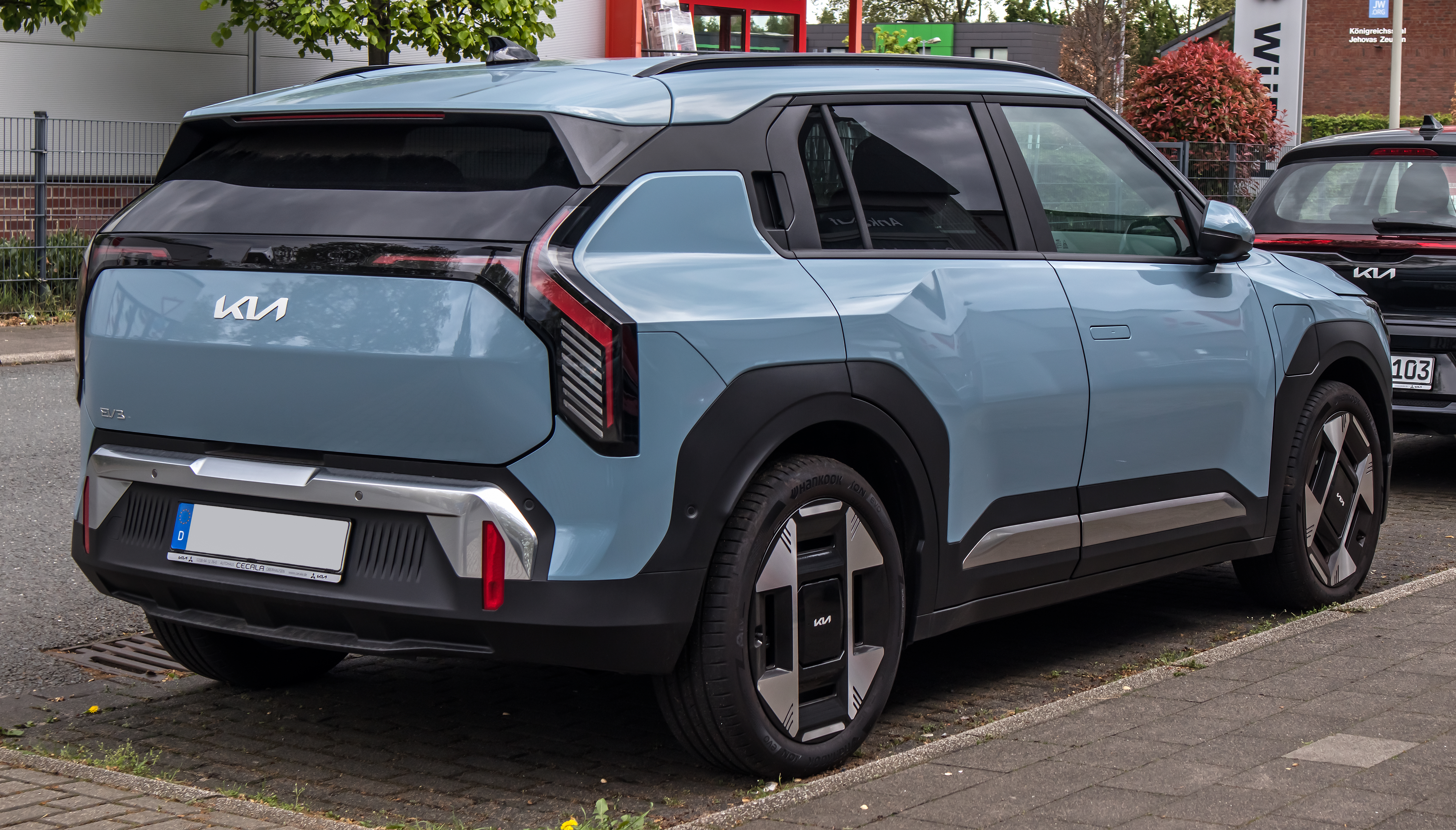
Rear view

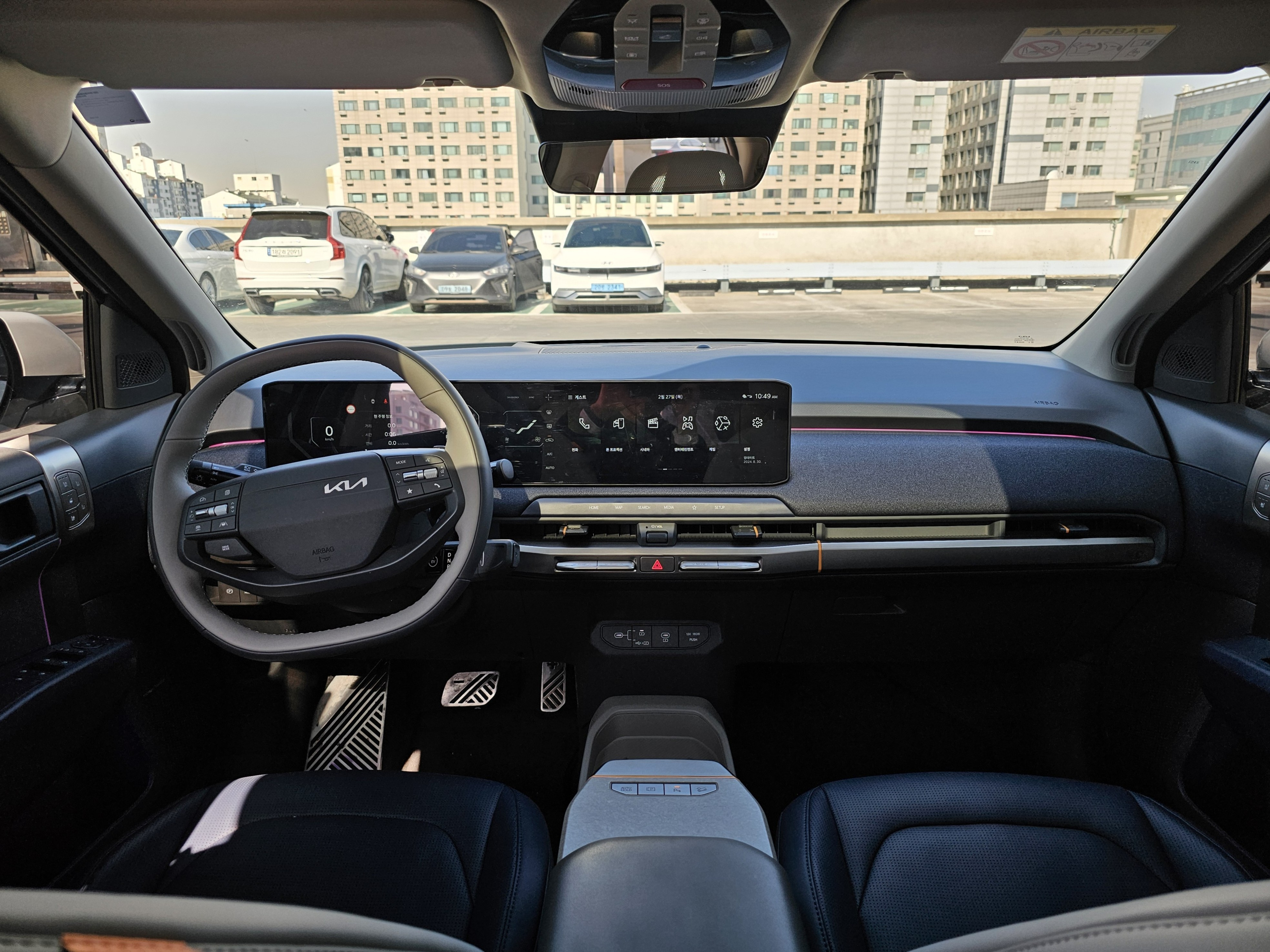
Interior

=== GT-Line ===
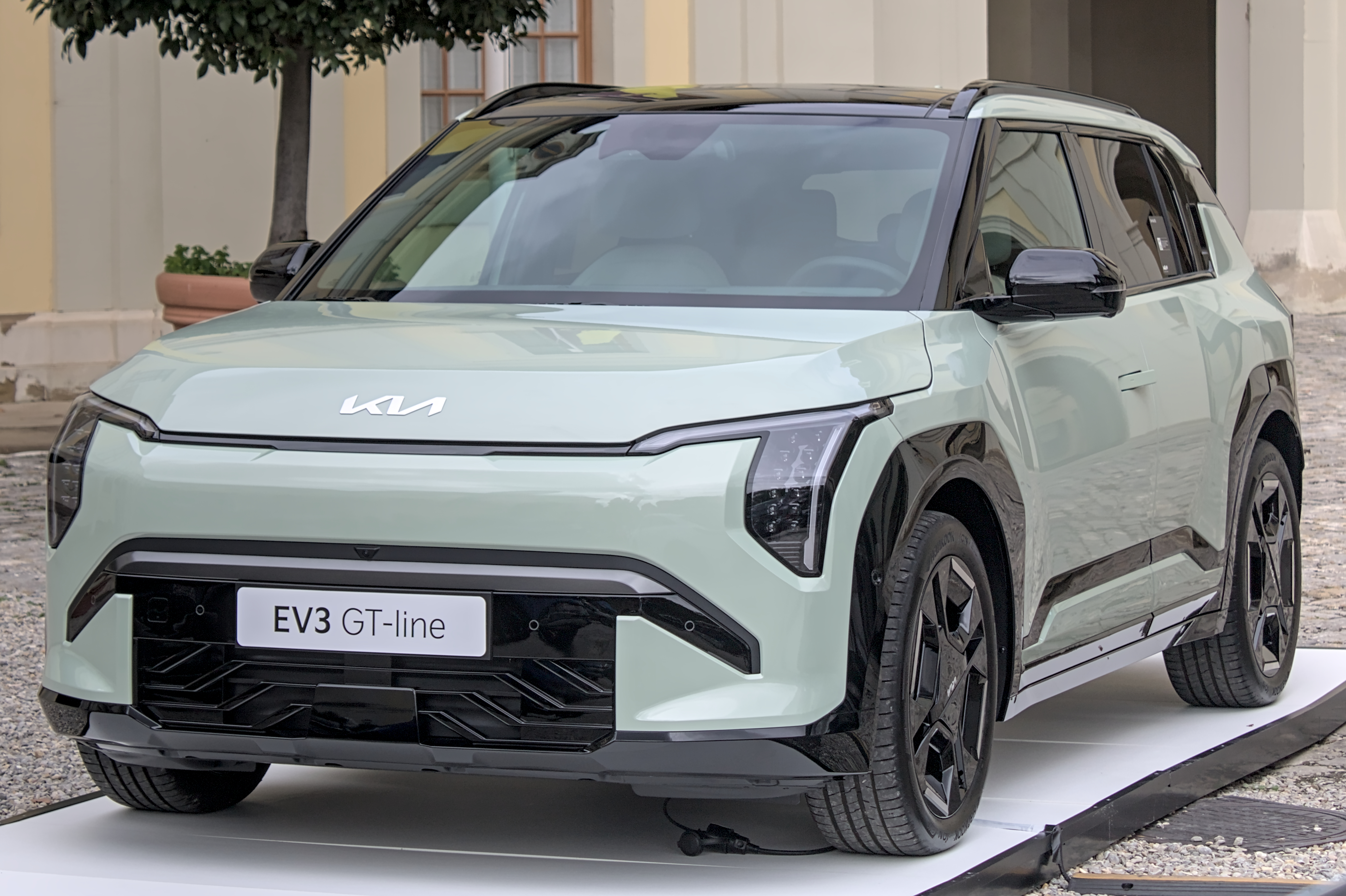
GT-Line (front)

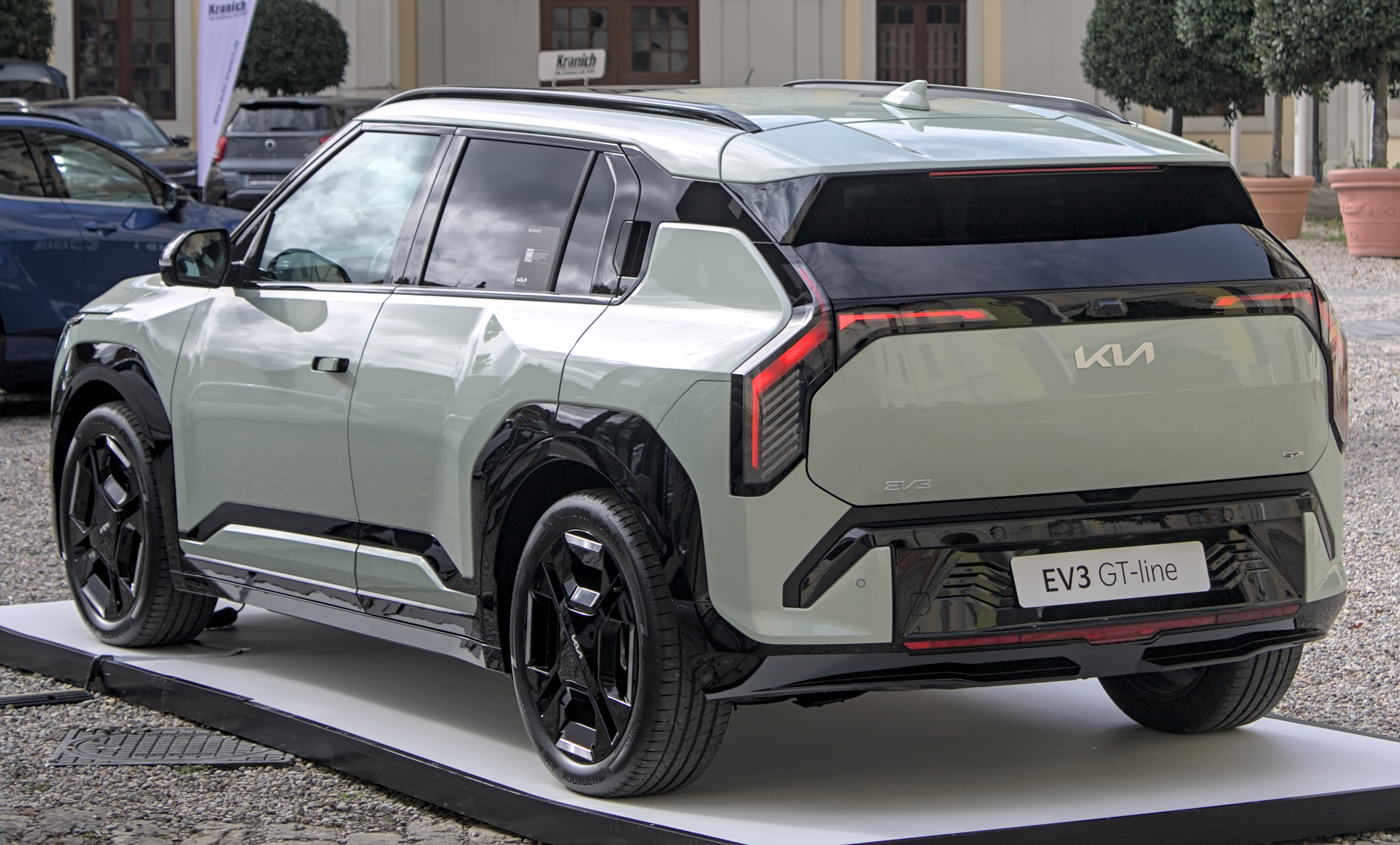
GT-Line (rear)

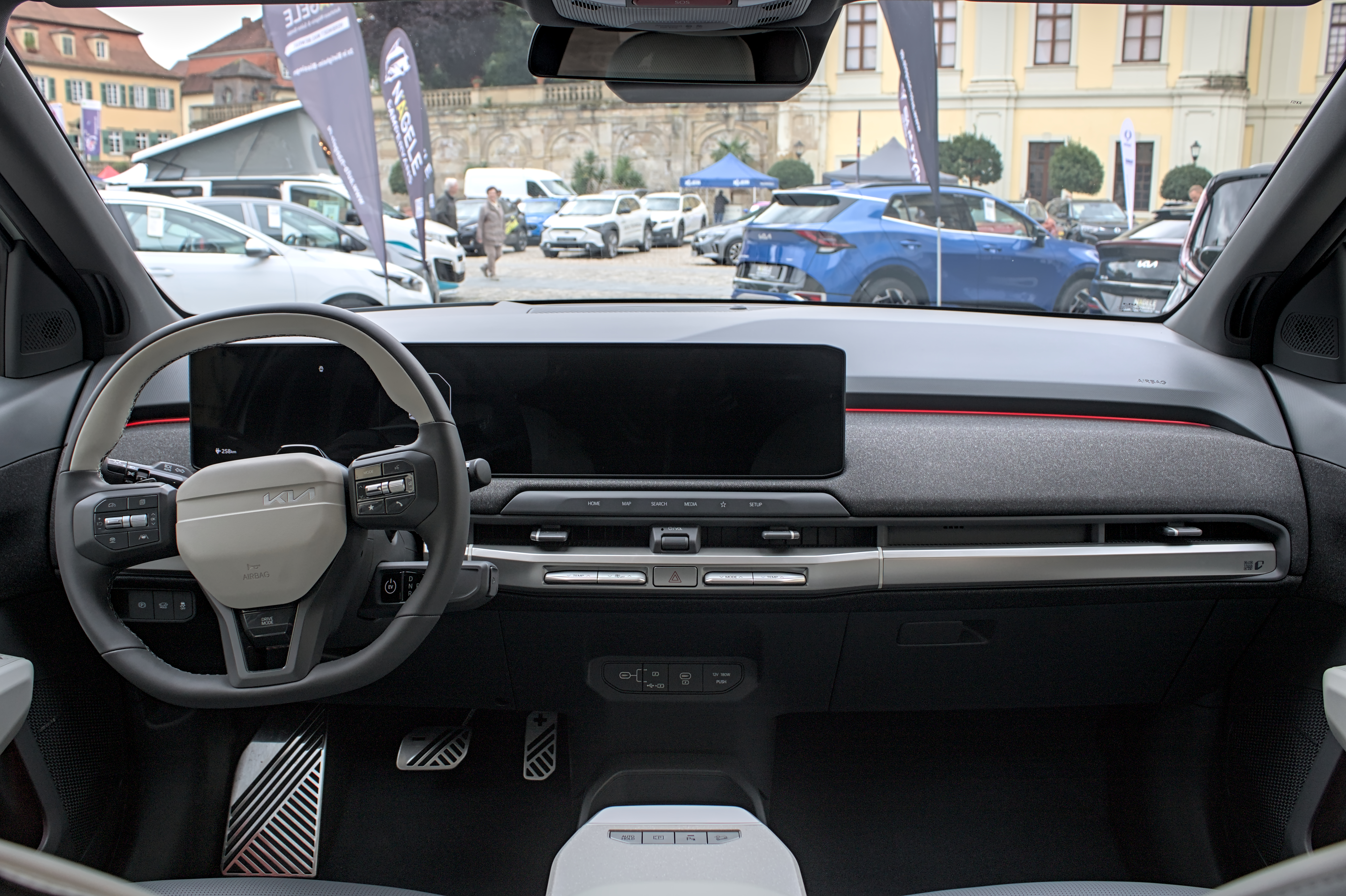
Interior (GT-Line)

=== EV3 GT ===
EV3 GT

The EV3 GT was released on 9 January 2026; it is a high-performance version of the EV3.

=== Safety ===
The EV3 has Advanced Driving Assistance Systems (ADAS) safety package combined with Electric Dynamic Torque Vectoring Control (eDTVC) feature, Digital Key 2.0 which allows consumers to use the smartphone instead of a physical keyfob, Remote Smart Parking Assist, and the first Kia model to debut their i-Pedal 3.0 regenerative braking feature.

Euro NCAP test results Kia EV3 150 kW 4x2 (LHD) (2025)
Test	Points	%
Overall:	4 /5 stars	
Adult occupant:	33.5	83%
Child occupant:	41.6	84%
Pedestrian:	48.7	77%
Safety assist:	12.2	67%

ANCAP test results Kia EV3 (2025, aligned with Euro NCAP)
Test	Points	%
Overall:	5 /5 stars	
Adult occupant:	33.52	83%
Child occupant:	42.40	86%
Pedestrian:	49.24	78%
Safety assist:	14.58	81%

== Markets ==
=== Asia ===
==== Philippines ====
The EV3 was launched in the Philippines on 21 September 2026, in the sole GL variant using the 58.3 kWh battery pack.

=== Europe ===
The EV3 debuted in Europe in November 2024, it is available in standard and GT Line derivatives. Kia aims to sell around 60,000 units annually of the EV3 in Europe.

=== North America ===
The Kia EV3 was presented at the 2026 New York International Auto Show in April 2026 for the 2027 model year. In North America, it is available in Light, Wind, Land, GT Line, GT Line Limited (only for Canada) and GT trims, with 58.3 kWh (FWD) and 81.4 kWh (AWD) battery options.

=== Latin America ===
==== Mexico ====
The EV3 went on sale in Mexico on 17 July 2026, with first deliveries commenced in August 2026. It is available with two variants: EX (54 kWh) and SXL (81 kWh).

Production commenced at the Kia Monterrey Plant (KMMX) on 4 August 2026, with exports destined for the North and Latin American markets.

=== Oceania ===
==== Australia ====
The EV3 was launched in Australia on 20 March 2025, with four variants: Air Standard Range, Air Long Range, Earth Long Range and GT Line Long Range.

==== New Zealand ====
The EV3 went on sale in New Zealand on 20 March 2025 with deliveries commenced in April 2025. It is available in three trim levels: Light (58 or 81 kWh), Earth (81 kWh) and GT Line (81 kWh).

== Awards ==
- 2025 Korea Car of the Year
- World Car of the Year — 2025 World Car Awards

== Sales ==
Year	South Korea	Europe	Global
2024	12,851	7,060	20,686
2025		72,650	97,649
