= Kia Imagine =

Kia concept vehicle

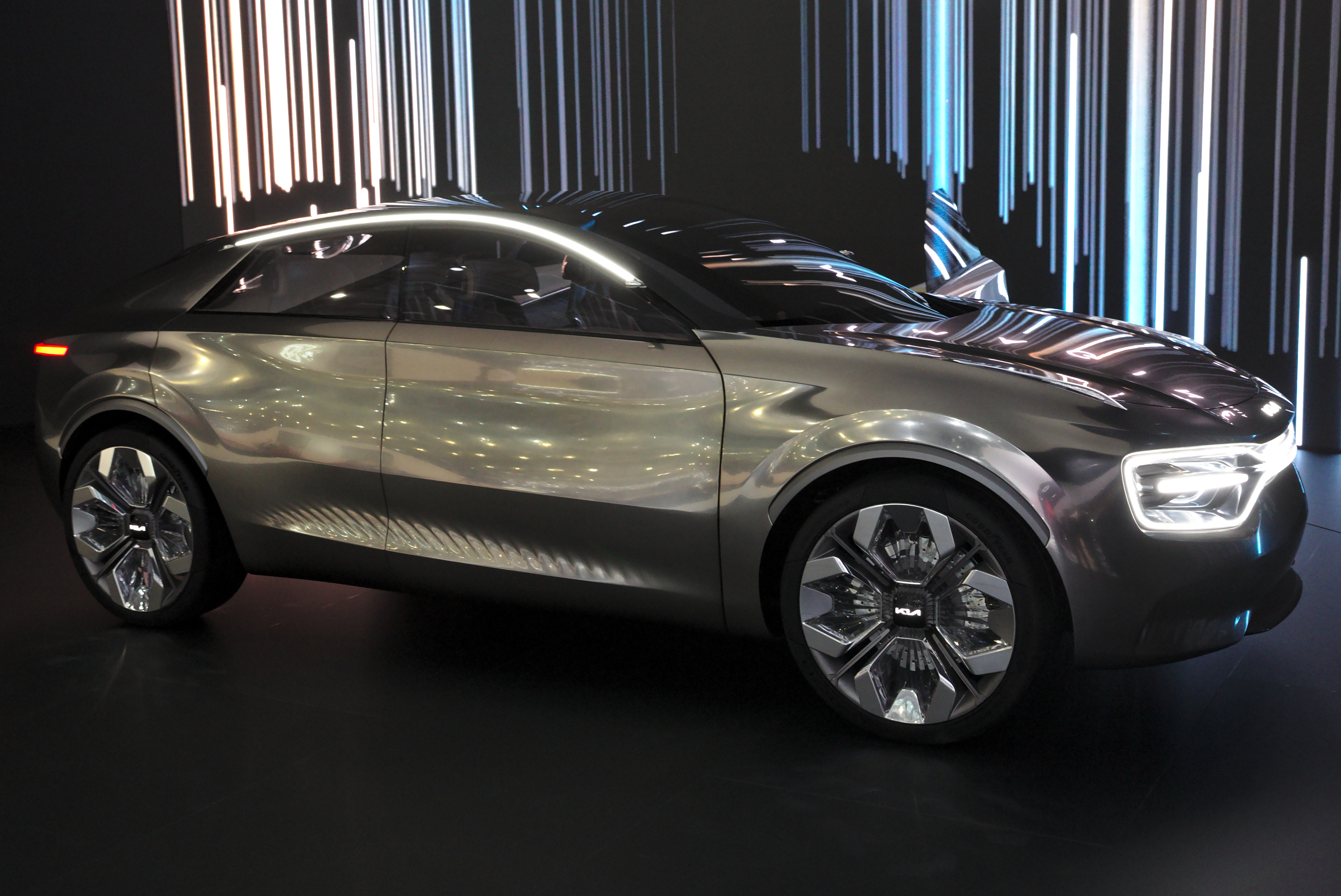
- 2019 Kia Imagine at the Geneva Motor Show (front)

Overview
- Manufacturer: Kia Motors
- Production: 2019

Body and chassis
- Class: compact crossover SUV (C)
- Body style: 4-door fastback

Chronology
- Successor: Kia EV6 (production model)

The Kia Imagine (presented as Imagine by Kia) is an electric compact crossover SUV concept revealed by South Korean automobile manufacturer Kia Motors at the 2019 Geneva International Motor Show.

== Overview ==
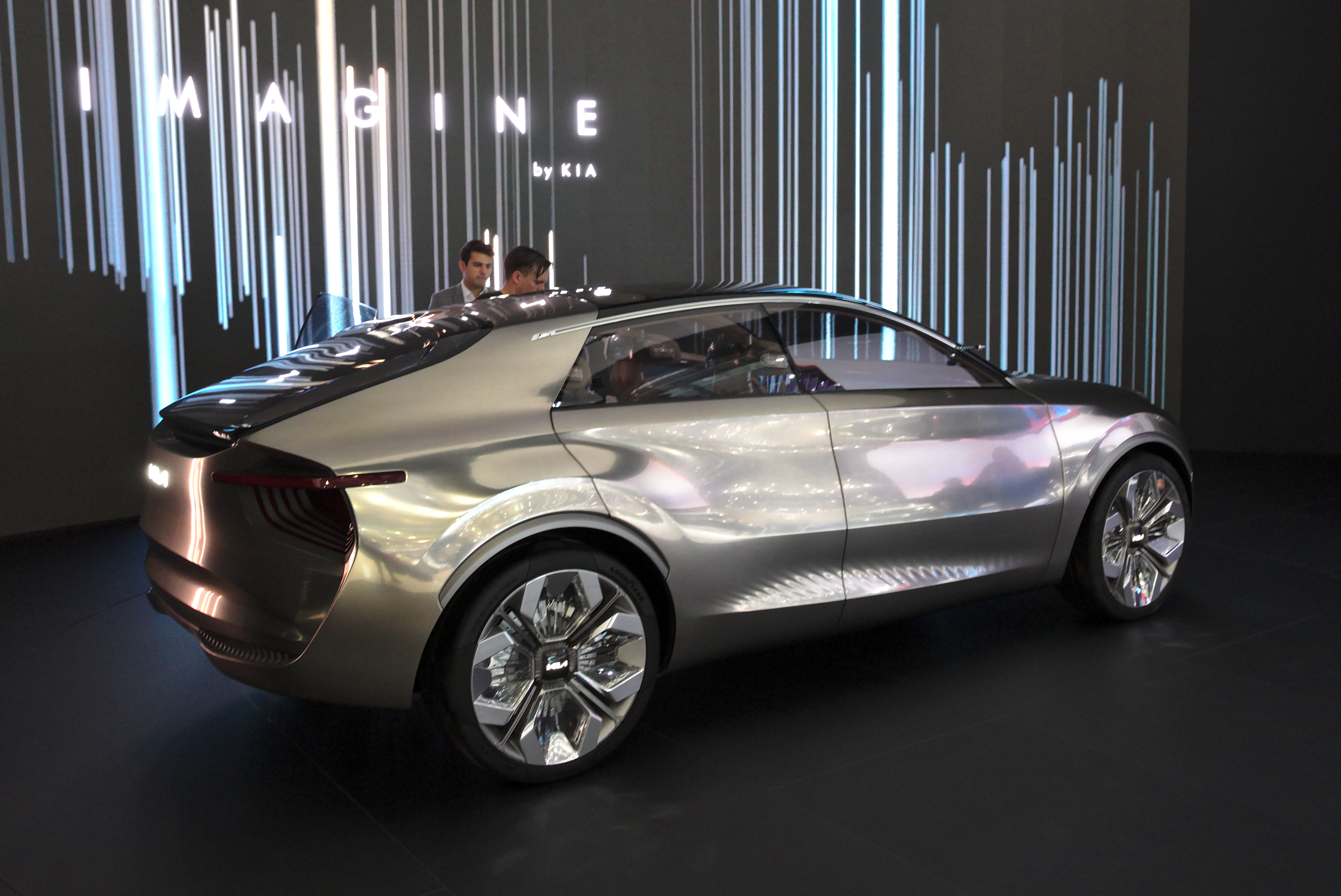
2019 Kia Imagine at the Geneva Motor Show (rear)

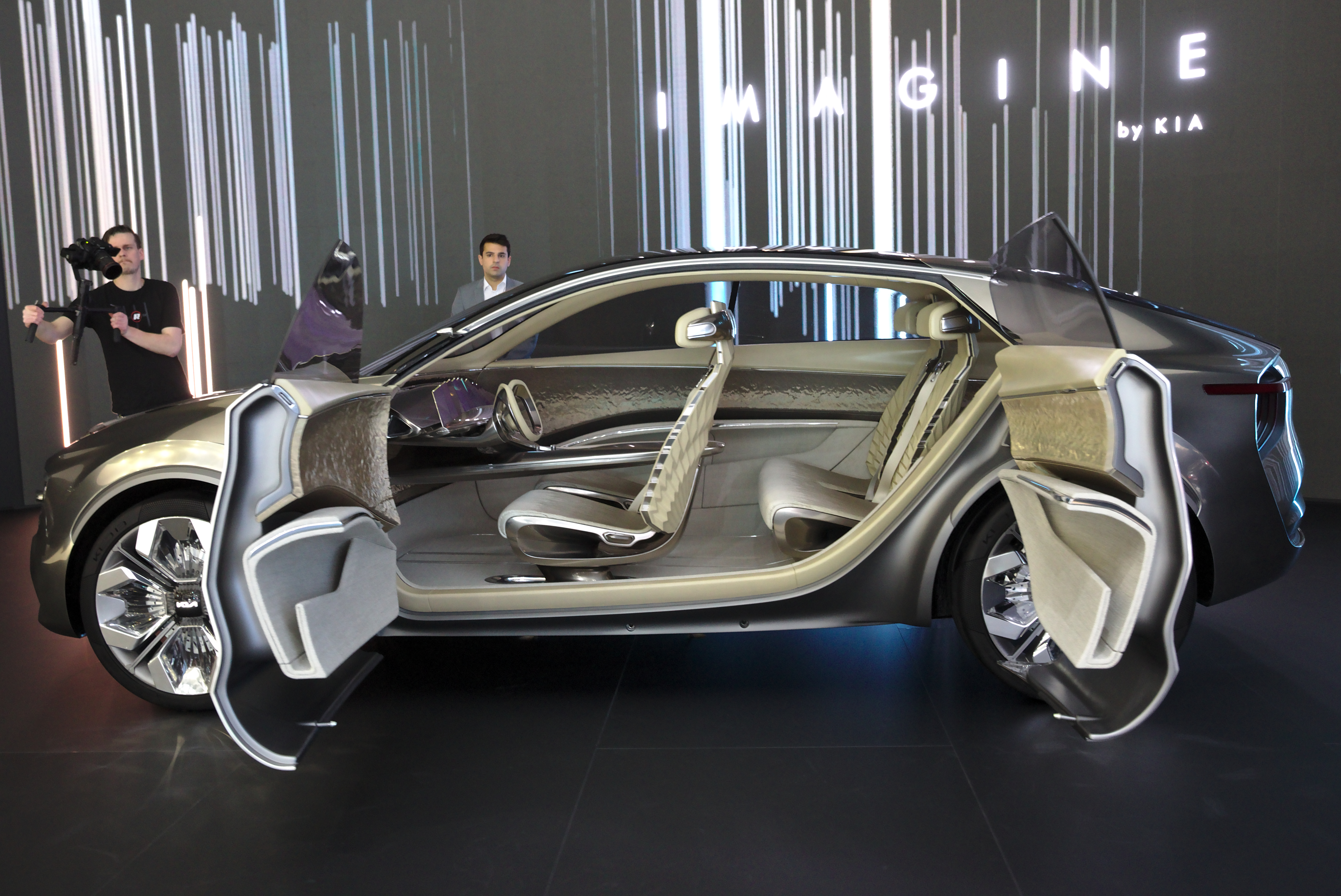
2019 Kia Imagine at the Geneva Motor Show (interior)

The Kia Imagine concept was revealed at the Geneva International Motor Show on March 7, 2019 in Geneva, Switzerland. It is a 4-door fastback-styled electric compact crossover SUV and is the first Kia vehicle to use the company's new logo. Gregory Guillaume, chief designer of Kia Motors Europe, says that the Imagine concept was designed to show that electric cars can be both exciting to drive and to look at. The Imagine concept preview an upcoming electric crossover planned to be released in 2021, the model being the Kia EV6.

== Specifications ==
=== Technical specs ===
Kia did not reveal many details on the Imagine concept's battery specifications, but did however note that the car uses a low-mounted, induction-charged battery pack, which powers a compact drivetrain.

=== Exterior ===
The Imagine concept features suicide doors and Kia's signature "tiger nose" grille in the form of headlights and is finished in a metallic silver color.

=== Interior ===
One of the most notable features on the interior of the Imagine is its 21 individual touchscreens on the dashboard, which, Kia Motors Europe general manager of interior design Ralph Kluge says "are a humorous and irreverent riposte to the on-going competition between some automotive manufacturers to see who can produce the car with the biggest screen.”

== Production model ==
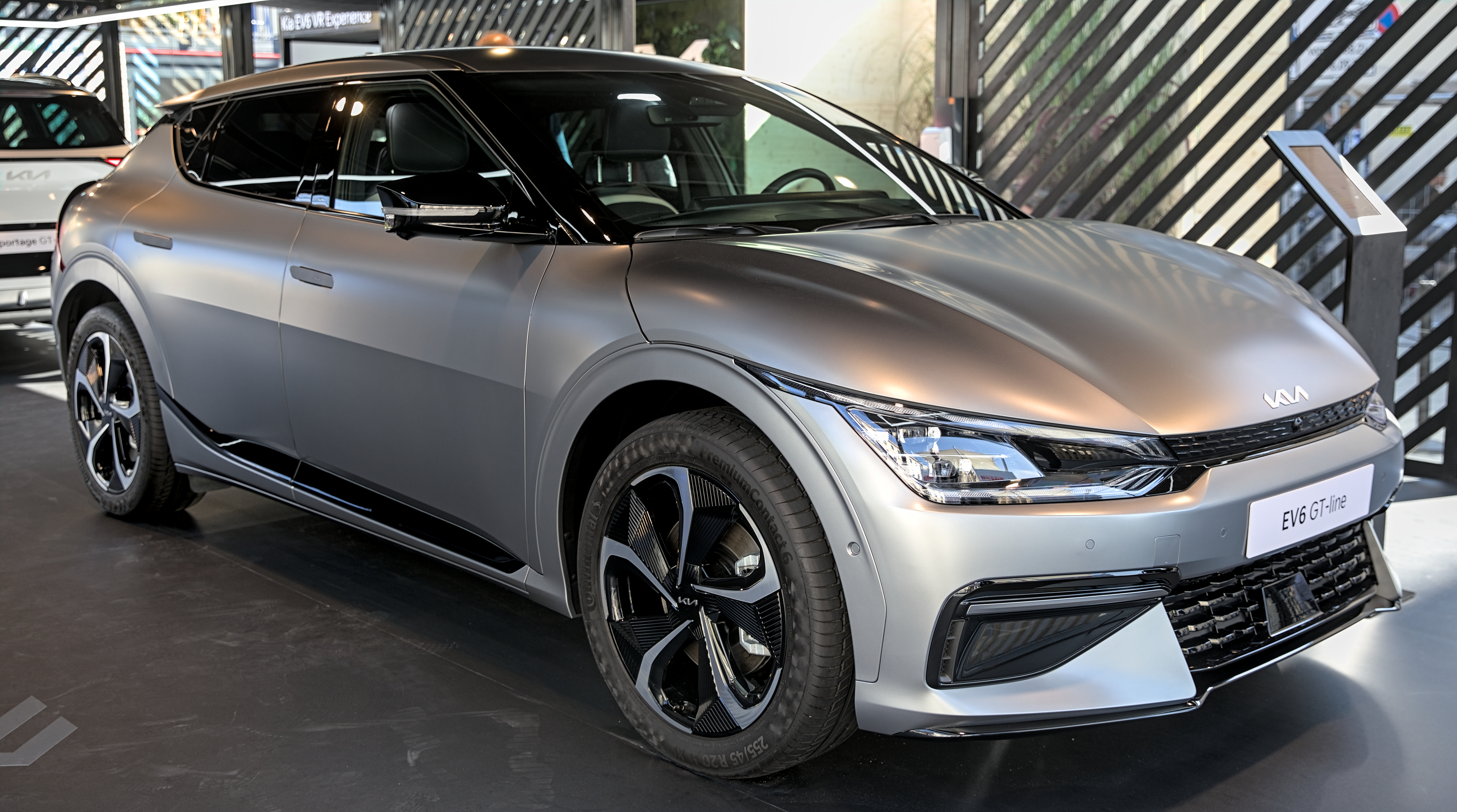
The 2022 Kia EV6 is the production model of the Imagine concept.

A production vehicle based on the design of the Imagine was first spied testing on public roads in January 2021 codenamed CV. This model was later officially revealed on May 18 as the Kia EV6 electric crossover, which retained similarities in its design cues and overall shape.
