= List of Hyundai Motor Company manufacturing facilities =

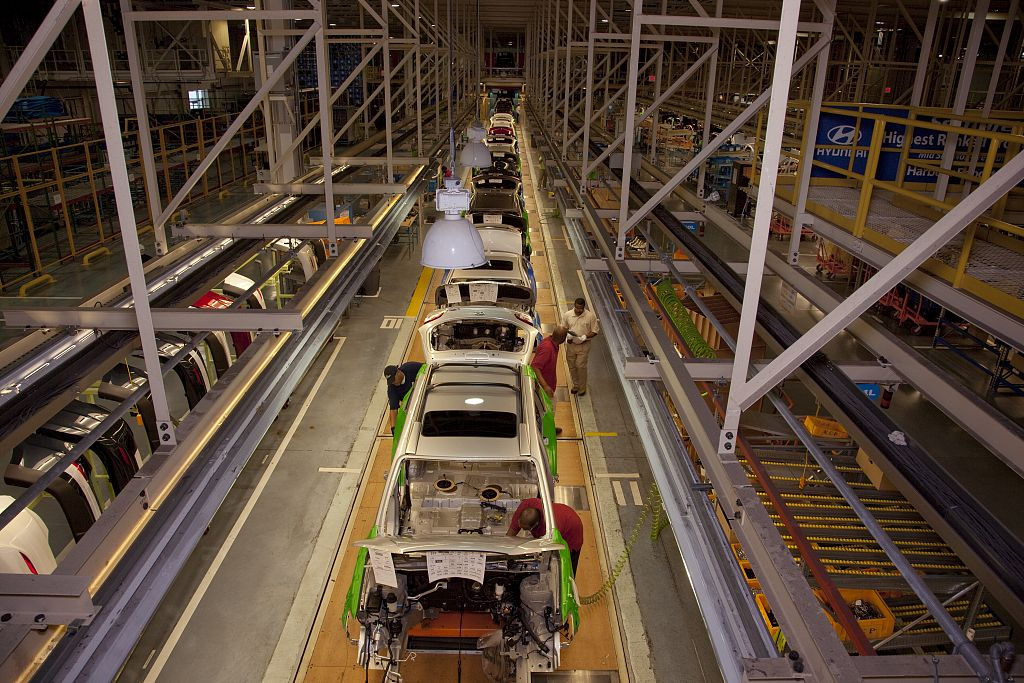
The assembly line of Hyundai Motor Manufacturing Alabama in the United States

Hyundai Motor Company maintains 12 manufacturing facilities in 10 countries, along with assembling vehicles in assembly plants owned by local companies in several countries.

== Domestic facilities ==
=== Ulsan Plant ===
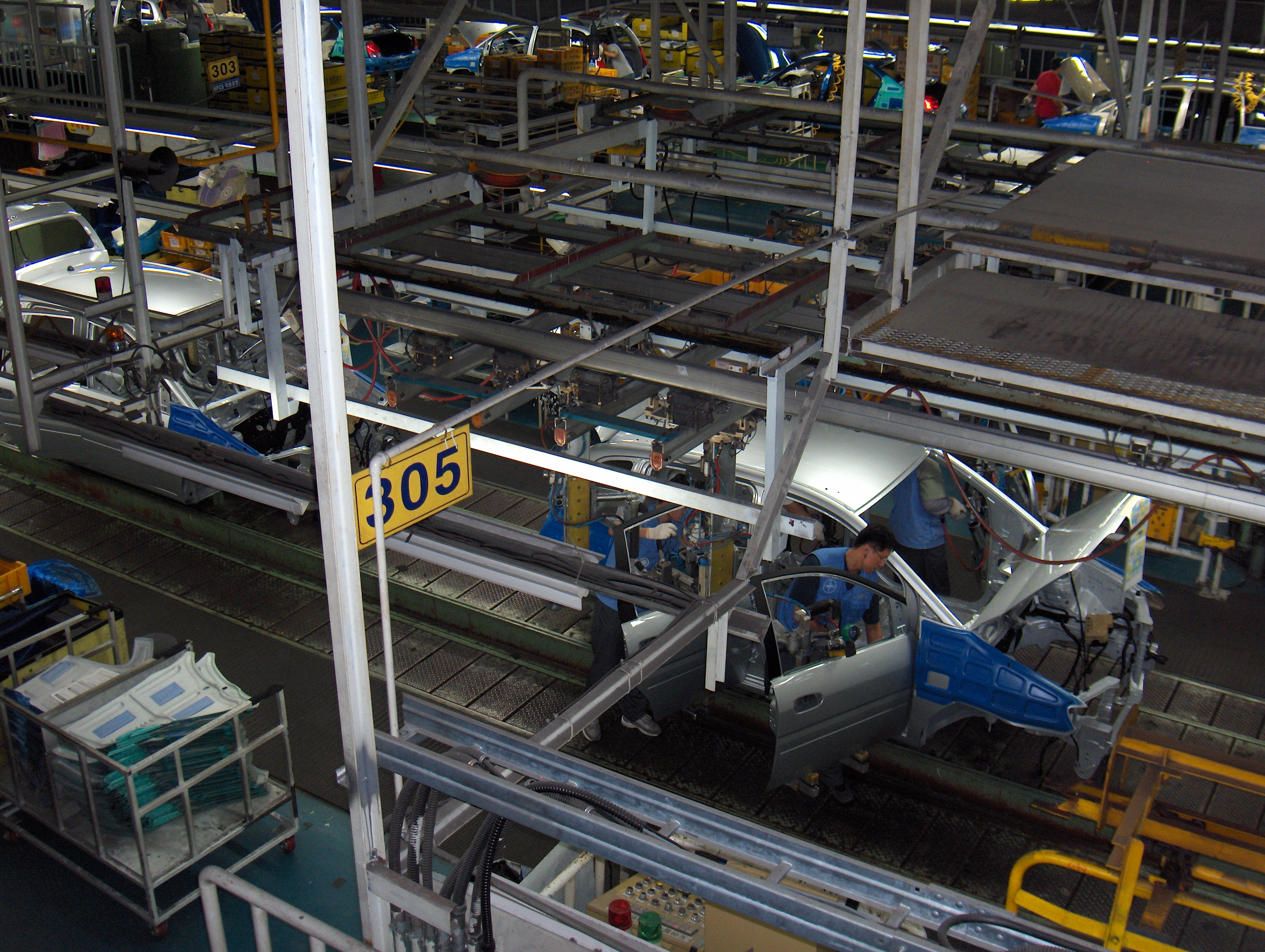
Assembly line at the Ulsan Plant, 2006

The Ulsan Plant is Hyundai Motor's main production plant and R&D Centre. The Ulsan complex sits on 1,200 acres and is the world's largest single automobile plant. The complex comprises five independent plants which employ over 34,000 workers capable of producing 5,600 vehicles daily, producing 38.2 percent of the nation's vehicles and R&D Centres. The plant also has its own port where up to three 42,000-ton ships can anchor at the same time. The plant is the birthplace of the South Korean automobile industry and is a self-contained facility that operates its own fire station, hospital and security vehicles. The production of the Pony, South Korea's first mass-produced car, began in the plant. It also has Research and Development Centre of Hyundai Motor Companty.

Established	1968
Location	Ulsan, South Gyeongsang Province, South Korea
Area	5,000,000 m^{2} (500 ha; 1,236 acres)
Plants	5
Employees	34,000
Annual capacity	1,400,000 vehicles

==== Current models ====
===== Plant 1 =====
Completed in 1968, Plant 1 has the capacity to produce 311,000 vehicles per year.

- Hyundai Kona
- Hyundai Ioniq 5
- Genesis GV60

===== Plant 2 =====
Completed in 1986, Plant 2 has the capacity to produce 257,000 vehicles per year.

- Hyundai Santa Fe
- Hyundai Tucson
- Hyundai Palisade
- Genesis GV70
- Genesis GV80

===== Plant 3 =====
Completed in 1990, Plant 3 has the capacity to produce 333,000 vehicles per year.

- Hyundai Elantra/Avante
- Hyundai Kona
- Hyundai Venue

===== Plant 4 =====
Completed in 1991, Plant 4 has the capacity to produce 235,000 vehicles per year.

- Hyundai Porter
- Hyundai Staria
- Hyundai ST1

===== Plant 5 =====
Completed in 1991, Plant 5 has the capacity to produce 264,000 vehicles per year.

- Hyundai Nexo
- Genesis G70
- Genesis G80
- Genesis G90

===== Plant 6 =====
Expected to be completed in 2026, Plant 6 has the capacity to produce 200,000 battery-electric vehicles per year.

- Genesis GV90 (to commence)

=== Asan Plant ===
The Asan Plant, consisting of one plant, mainly produces the Sonata and Grandeur sedans as well as the Ioniq 6 electric sedan and Ioniq 9 electric SUV. It also produces the Nu, Theta, and Lambda engines.

Established	1996
Location	Asan, South Chungcheong Province, South Korea
Area	1,830,000 m^{2} (183 ha; 452 acres)
Plants	1
Employees	4,000
Annual capacity	300,000 vehicles 600,000 engines

==== Current models ====
- Hyundai Sonata (1996–present)
- Hyundai Grandeur/Azera (1998–present)
- Hyundai Ioniq 6 (2022–present)
- Hyundai Ioniq 9 (2025–present)
- Hyundai Elantra (2026-present)

=== Jeonju Plant ===
The Jeonju Plant, consisting of one plant, exclusively produces commercial vehicles. The plant is located in Wanju-gun, North Jeolla Province near Jeonju-si.

- Hyundai Solati/H350
- Hyundai County/County Electric
- Hyundai New Super Aero City
- Hyundai Universe/Universe FCEV/Universe Mobile Office
- Hyundai Elec City/Elec City Town
- Hyundai Mighty
- Hyundai Pavise
- Hyundai New Power Truck
- Hyundai Xcient/Xcient FCEV

=== Gwangju Global Motors (GGM) ===
Gwangju Global Motors (GGM) is a joint venture manufacturing plant between Hyundai Motor Company and the Gwangju city government. It is opened in 2021 as the first newly built automobile manufacturing plant in South Korea since 1998. It was the only Hyundai-operated manufacturing plant in South Korea without the presence of workers unions, which enabled average annual pay to be less than half than other Hyundai plants.

Established	2021
Location	Gwangsan-gu, Gwangju, South Korea
Area	604,339 m^{2} (60 ha; 149 acres)
Plants	1
Employees	1,000
Annual capacity	70,000 vehicles

==== Current models ====
- Hyundai Casper (2021–present)
- Hyundai Casper Electric/Inster (2024–present)

== International facilities ==
=== Hyundai Motor Manufacturing Alabama (HMMA) ===
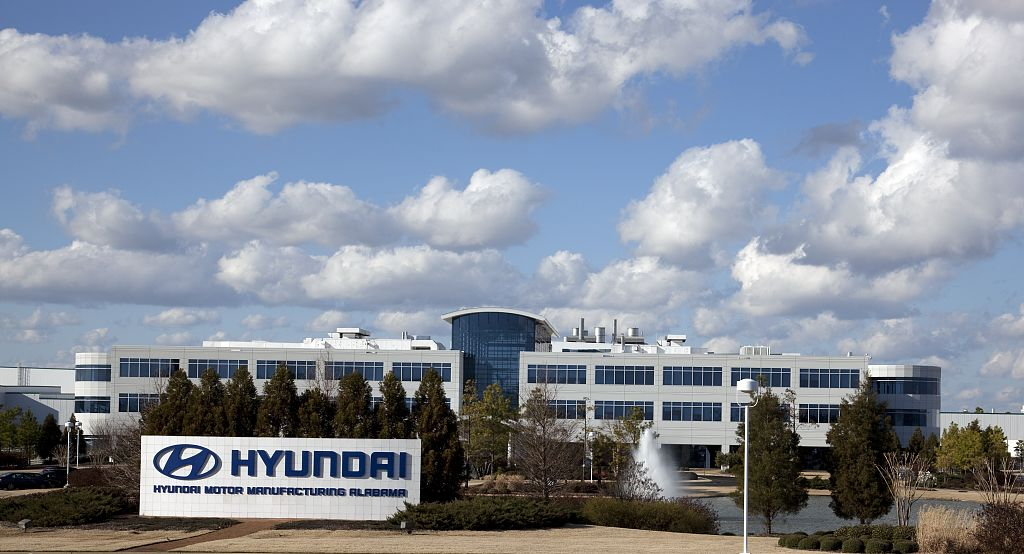
Hyundai Motor Manufacturing Alabama

Opened in 2005, Hyundai Motor Manufacturing Alabama (HMMA) is a manufacturing facility owned by Hyundai Motor Company employing approximately 3,000 people. Located in Montgomery, Alabama, the facility marked the official start of production with the 2006 Sonata in May 2005. HMMA is capable of producing up to 399,500 vehicles per year at full capacity. Apart from vehicle assembly, HMMA also produces Smartstream G2.5 GDI, G1.6 T-GDI, G2.0 Atkinson, G2.5 GDI, and G2.5 T-GDI engines.

Established	2005
Location	Montgomery, Alabama, United States
Area	7,160,000 m^{2} (716 ha; 1,769 acres)
Plants	1
Employees	3,100
Annual capacity	370,000 vehicles 700,000 engines

==== Current models ====
- Hyundai Santa Fe (2016–present)
- Hyundai Tucson (2022–present)
- Hyundai Santa Cruz (2022–present)
- Genesis GV70 (2023–2026)

=== Hyundai Motor Brasil (HMB) ===
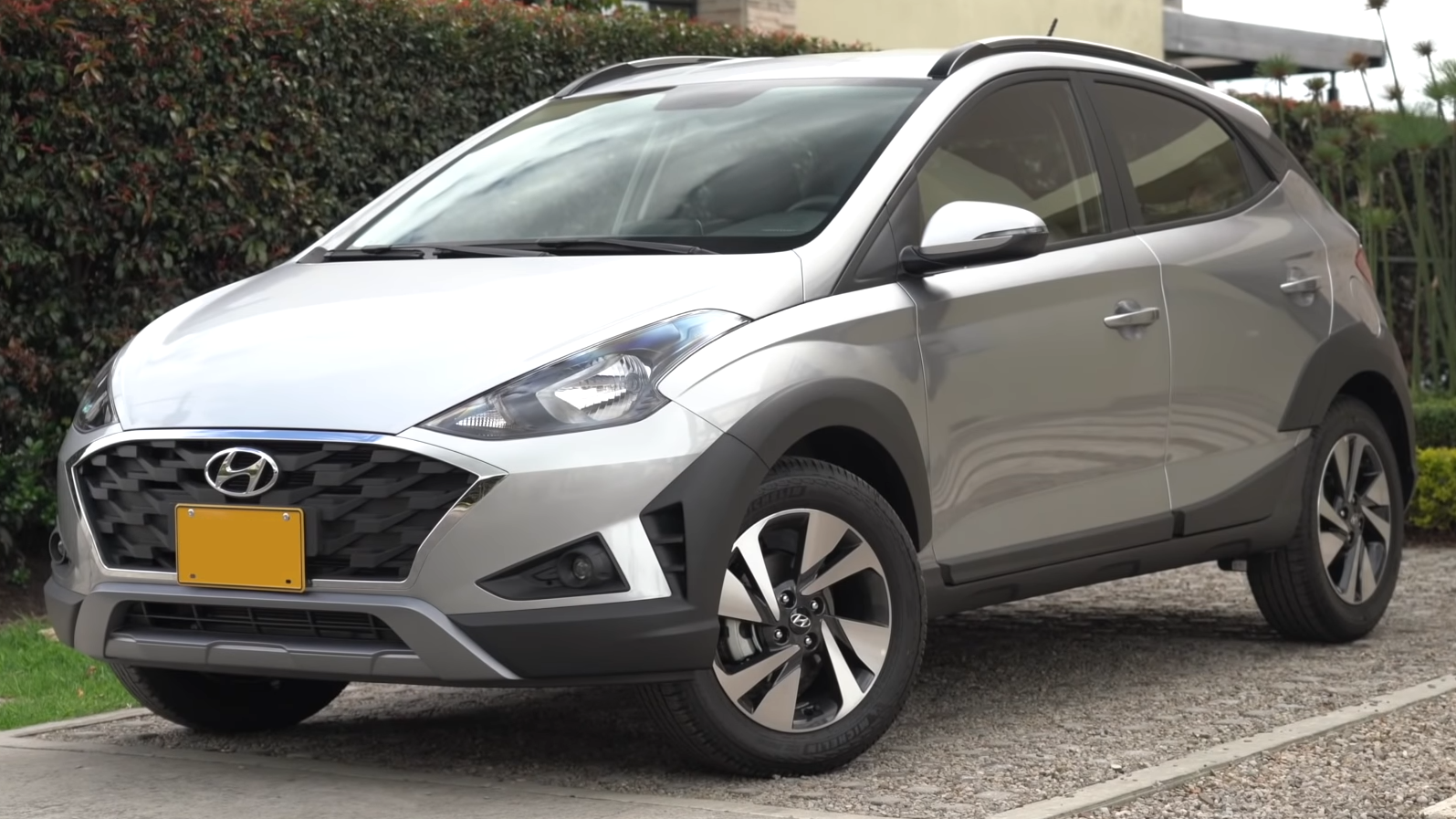
Hyundai HB20, exclusively manufactured by HMB.

Located in Piracicaba, São Paulo, Hyundai Motor Brasil (HMB) is the first Hyundai Motor plant in Latin America. With an investment of around R$1.2 billion, the plant has the capacity to produce 180,000 cars per year under three shifts. The plant produced the HB20 subcompact line-up, which stands for 'Hyundai Brasil'.

Established	2012
Location	Piracicaba, São Paulo, Brasil
Area	1,390,000 m^{2} (139 ha; 343 acres)
Plants	1
Employees	2,486
Annual capacity	180,000 vehicles

==== Current models ====
- Hyundai HB20 (2012–present)
- Hyundai Creta (2017–present)
- Hyundai i20 (2026–present)

=== Hyundai Motor Manufacturing Czech (HMMC) ===
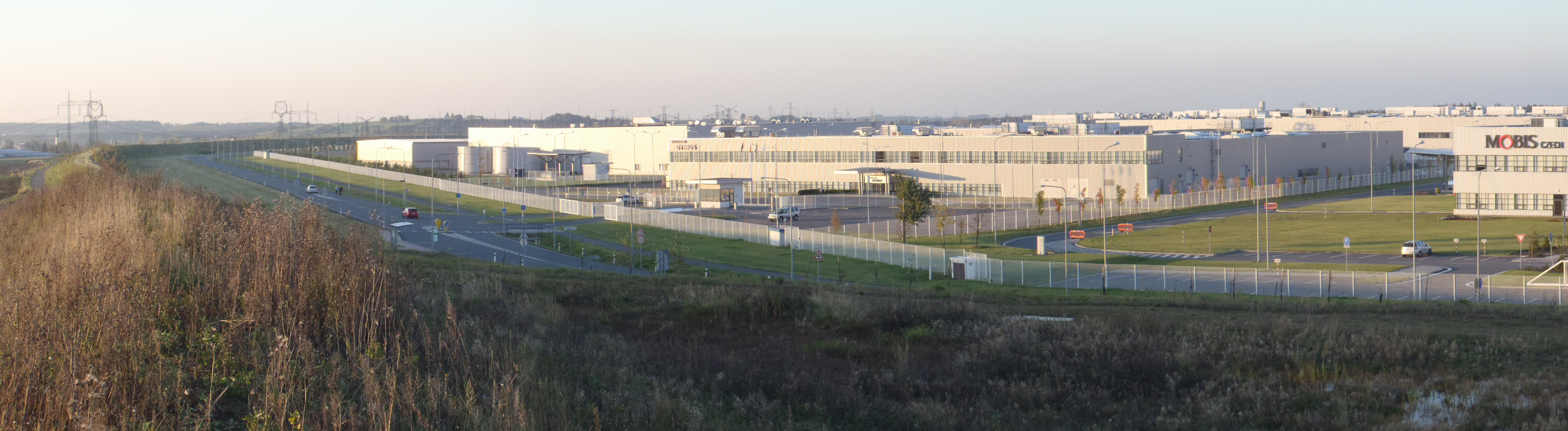
Hyundai Motor Manufacturing Czech (HMMC)

In November 2008, Hyundai opened the European plant in Nošovice, Czech Republic, following an investment of over 1 billion euros and over two years of construction. The plant, which mainly manufactures the i30 and Tucson for the European market, has an annual capacity of 300,000 cars. It previously also built the ix20 mini MPV. The new Hyundai plant is 90 kilometres north of Kia Žilina Plant in Slovakia. It began manufacturing Kona Electric since March 2020 at the same production line with i30 and Tucson. In 2022, HMMC made transition into eco-friendly factory according to the carbon-neutral plan and is being operated by electric power generated from renewable energy.

Established	2007
Location	Nošovice, Moravian-Silesian, Czech Republic
Area	2,000,000 m^{2} (200 ha; 494 acres)
Plants	1
Employees	3,248
Annual capacity	350,000 vehicles 530,000 engines

==== Current models ====
- Hyundai i30 (2008–present)
- Hyundai Tucson (2011–present)
- Hyundai Kona Electric (2020–present)

=== Hyundai Motor Türkiye (HMTR) ===
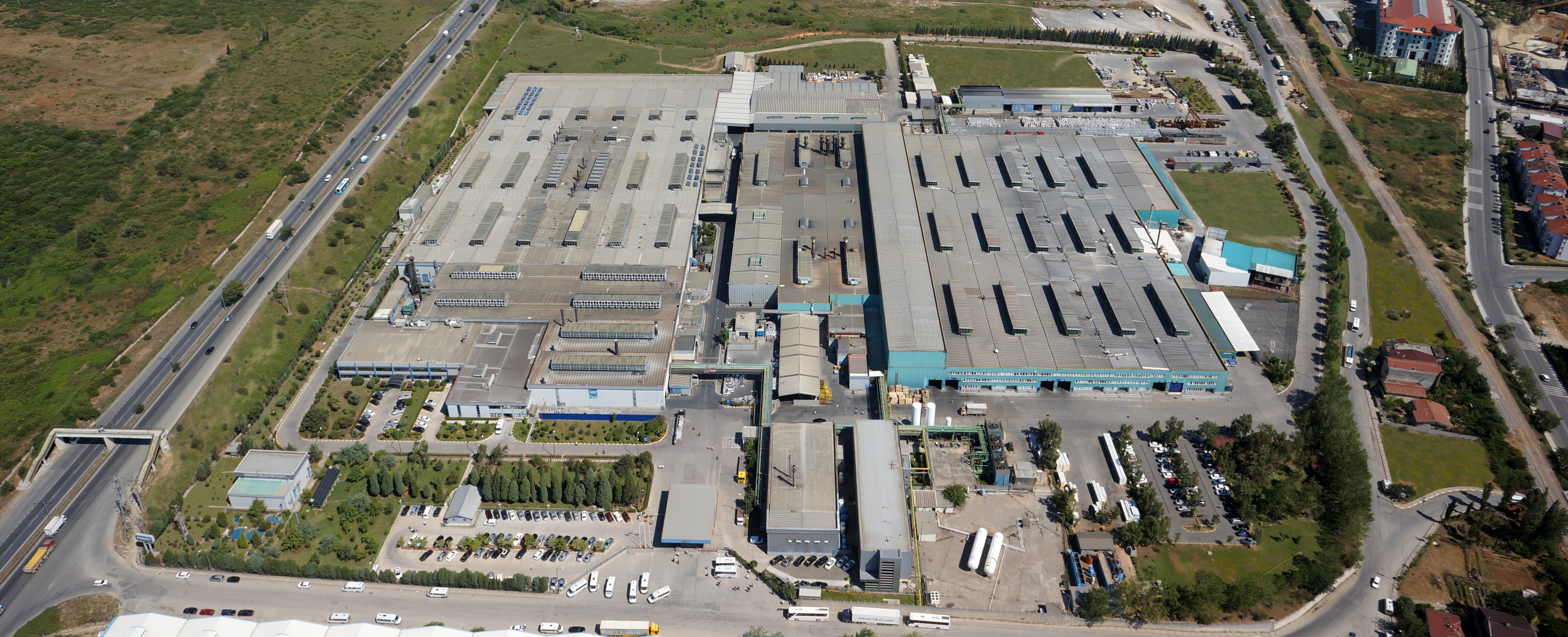
Hyundai Assan Otomotiv

Opened in September 1997, Hyundai Assan Otomotiv (HAOS) is a joint venture between the Hyundai Motor Company of South Korea and the Kibar Holding of Turkey. Its headquarters is located in Kozyatagi, Istanbul, Turkey. The company serves as the production base of small Hyundai models for the European market. Throughout its operations, the plant has also produced the Accent, Matrix, Grace and Starex. It is the first overseas plant owned by Hyundai Motor Company.

Established	1997
Location	İzmit, Kocaeli Province, Turkey
Area	691,500 m^{2} (69 ha; 171 acres)
Plants	1
Employees	2,467
Annual capacity	230,000 vehicles

==== Current models ====
- Hyundai i20 (2010–present)
- Hyundai Bayon (2021–present)
- Hyundai Ioniq 3 (2026-present)

=== Hyundai Motor India (HMIL) ===
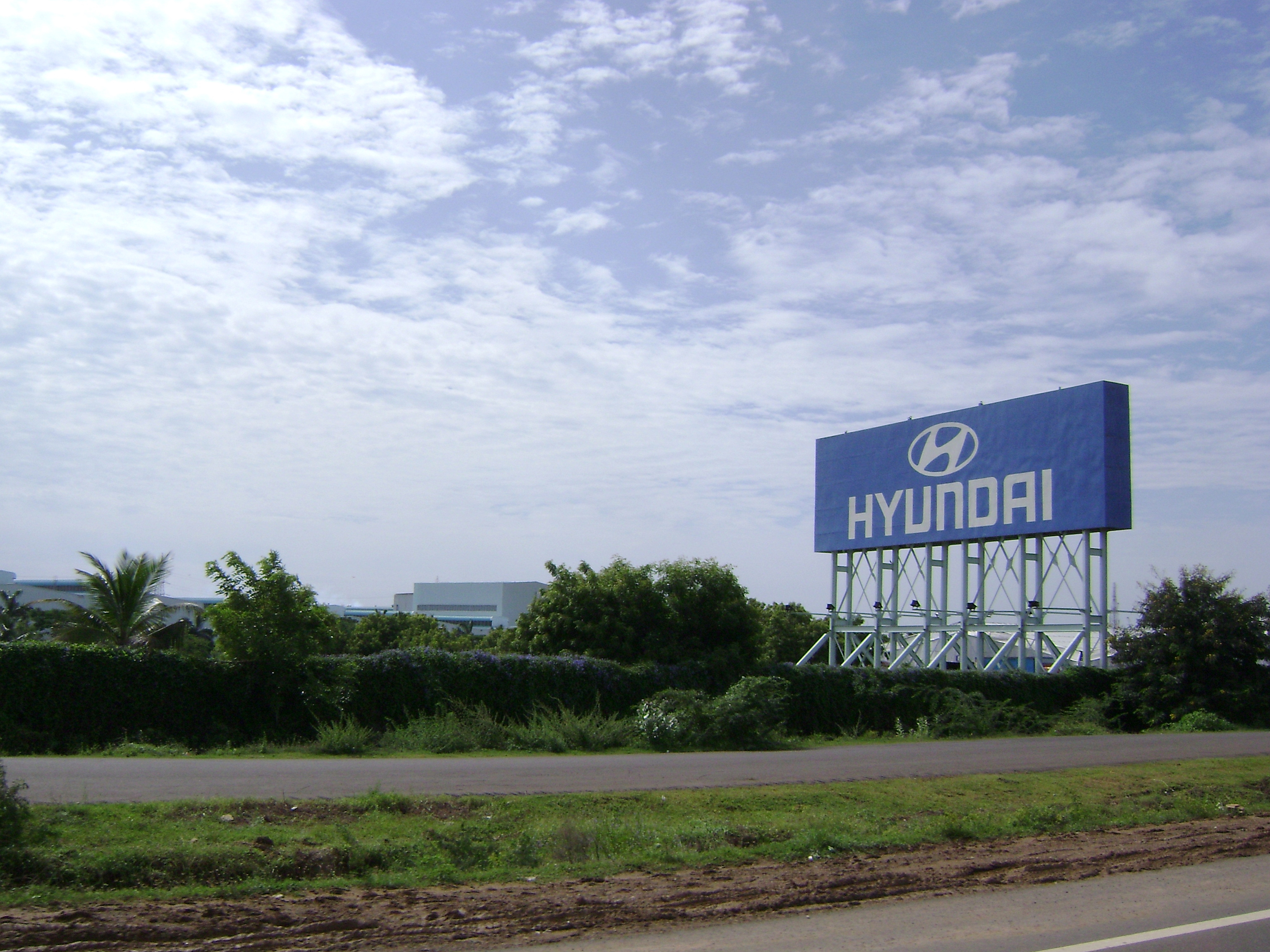
Hyundai's manufacturing plant at Irungattukottai near Chennai, India.

Formed in May 1996, Hyundai Motor India Limited (HMIL) started its operations producing its first model in September 1998, the Santro. HMIL is the global export hub for compact cars for emerging markets. HMIL have two manufacturing plants in Irungattukottai near to sriperumbudur in Tamil Nadu, both near the city of Chennai. In 2021, the cumulative production exceeded 10 million units. In 2019, additional electric vehicle production lines were established to start assembly production (CKD) of Kona Electric, and partial assembly production (SKD) of Ioniq 5 was decided in August 2022.

Established	1998
Location	Irungattukottai, Tamil Nadu, India
Location	Sriperumbudur, Tamil Nadu, India
Area	2,140,000 m^{2} (214 ha; 529 acres)
Plants	2
Employees	10,000
Annual capacity	824,000 vehicles 1,000,000 engines

==== Current models ====
- Hyundai Verna (2006–present)
- Hyundai i10 (2007–present)
- Hyundai i20 (2008–present)
- Hyundai Creta (2015–present)
- Hyundai Venue (2019–present)
- Hyundai Aura (2020–present)
- Hyundai Alcazar (2021–present)
- Hyundai Exter (2023–present)
- Hyundai Ioniq 5 (2023–present)
- Hyundai Bayon (2026–present)

=== Hyundai Motor Manufacturing Indonesia (HMMI) ===
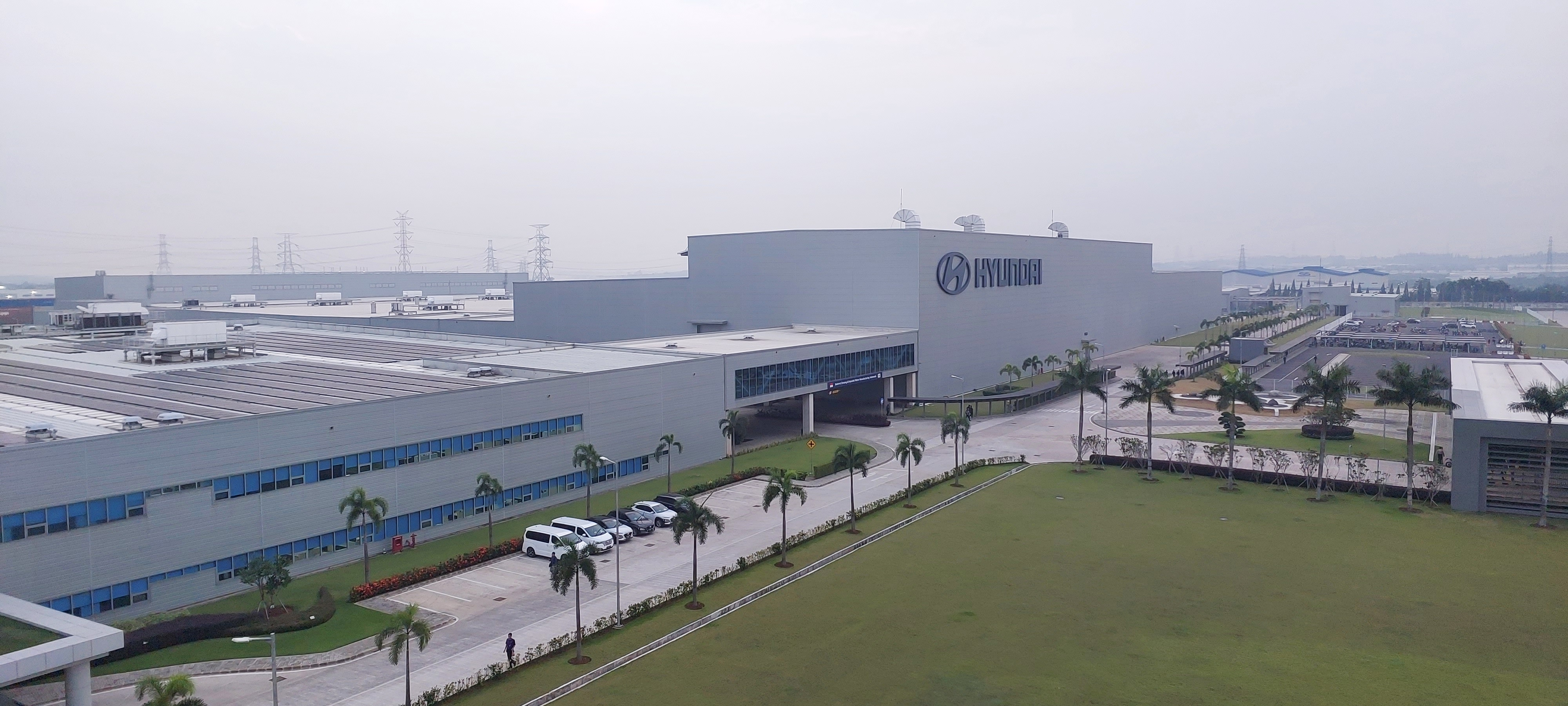
HMMI, Hyundai's largest automotive manufacturing plant in Southeast Asia

Hyundai Motor Manufacturing Indonesia (HMMI) is built in Cikarang, Bekasi, West Java in 2019 and fully operated in January 2022 with the annual capacity of 150,000 vehicles, upgradable to 250,000. Half of the output is exported to the neighbouring countries in Southeast Asia. A total of US$1.55 billion (Rp 21.7 trillion) would be invested to the plant along with the future product developments until 2030. HMMI produces the Hyundai Creta, the electric-vehicle Hyundai Ioniq 5, and Stargazer compact MPV in this plant among other models, including the Hyundai Santa Fe and Hyundai Kona Electric.

Established	2021
Location	Bekasi, West Java, Indonesia
Area	776,000 m^{2} (78 ha; 192 acres)
Plants	1
Employees	3,720
Annual capacity	150,000 vehicles

==== Current models ====
- Hyundai Creta (2022–present)
- Hyundai Ioniq 5 (2022–present)
- Hyundai Santa Fe (2022–present)
- Hyundai Stargazer (2022–present)
- Hyundai Kona Electric (2024–present)
- Hyundai Neira (2026–present)
- Kia Carens EV (2026–present)

=== Hyundai Motor Group Innovation Center in Singapore (HMGICS) ===
The Hyundai Motor Group Innovation Center in Singapore (HMGICS) is built in Jurong district and produces the Hyundai Ioniq 5 since 2023. Hyundai plans to produce 30,000 battery electric models a year at the plant, of which about 6,000 will be sold in Singapore.

Established	2022
Location	Jurong, Singapore
Area	
Plants	1
Employees	
Annual capacity	30,000 vehicles

==== Current models ====
- Hyundai Ioniq 5 (2023–present)
- Hyundai Ioniq 6 (2024–present)
- Kia EV5 (2025–present)

=== Hyundai Motor Group Metaplant America (HMGMA) ===
In October 2024, Hyundai Motor Group Metaplant America began production in their new facility, off of I-16 in Ellabell, Bryan County, Georgia. With over 1,400+ employees, a public opening is expected in early 2025.

Production started	October 2024
Location	Bryan County, Georgia, United States
Area	1,500,000 m^{2} (150 ha; 371 acres)
Plant(s)	1
Employees	1,400+
Annual capacity	300,000 vehicles

==== Current models ====
- Hyundai Ioniq 5 (2024–present)
- Hyundai Ioniq 9 (2024–present)
- Kia Sportage (2026–present)

== Joint venture international facilities ==
=== Beijing Hyundai Motor Company (BHMC) ===
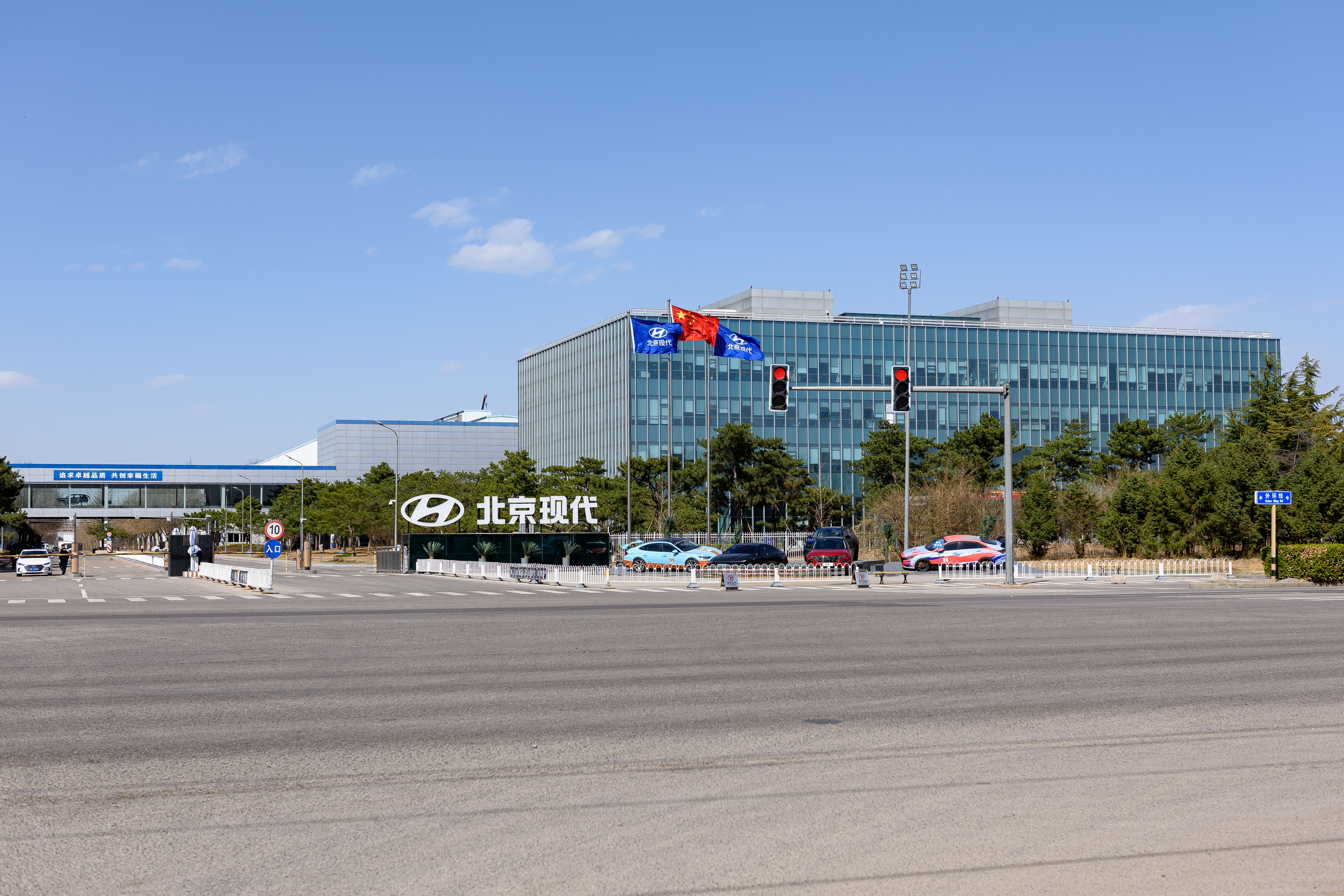
Beijing Hyundai headquarters and manufacturing base

Beijing Hyundai Motor Company (BHMC) is a 50–50 joint venture between Hyundai Motor and Beijing Automotive Holdings, which was established in 2002. It began operations in China by producing Sonata in December 2002. It operates in Shunyi District, a satellite city of Beijing, producing Hyundai-branded automobiles for the Chinese market.

Hyundai planned to transform its Chongqing Plant 5 in China into an electric vehicle plant in a bid to reinvigorate its slumping Chinese business, as the plant suffered a low operation rate as it was completed when China's retaliation against South Korea peaked in 2017. However, the company ended up putting the plant on sale as of August 2023.

Established	2002
Location	Shunyi District, Beijing, China (Plant 1, 2, 3)
Location	Cangzhou, Hebei, China (Plant 4)
Location	Liangjiang, Chongqing, China (Plant 5)
Area	5,190,000 m^{2} (519 ha; 1,282 acres)
Plants	5
Employees	15,768
Annual capacity	1,250,000 vehicles

==== Current models ====
- Hyundai Sonata (2002–present)
- Hyundai Elantra (2003–present)
- Hyundai Tucson (2005–present)
- Hyundai Santa Fe (2012–present)
- Hyundai Custo (2021–present)
- Hyundai Mufasa (2023–present)
- Hyundai Elexio (2025–present)

=== Hyundai Thanh Cong Manufacturing Vietnam (HTMV) ===
Located in Gian Khau Industrial Park, Ninh Bình province, the factory is a joint venture between Hyundai Motor Company and Thanh Cong Manufacturing. Hyundai began exporting its cars in complete knock down (CKD) format to Vietnam in 2011. In 2017, these two companies established Hyundai Thanh Cong Manufacturing Vietnam (HTMV) to produce complete cars with a minimum localization rate of 40 percent.

Established	2011
Location	Gia Viễn, Ninh Bình, Vietnam
Area	N/A
Plants	2
Employees	3,400
Annual capacity	170,000 vehicles

==== Current models ====
- Hyundai i10 (2017–present)
- Hyundai Tucson (2017–present)
- Hyundai Porter (2016–present)
- Hyundai Elantra (2016–present)
- Hyundai Santa Fe (2014–present)
- Hyundai Creta (2023–present)
- Hyundai Ioniq 5 (2023–present)
- Hyundai Custin (2023–present)
- Hyundai Universe (2019–present)
- Hyundai Accent (2018–present)
- Hyundai Solati (2018–present)
- Hyundai Venue (2023–present)
- Hyundai Palisade (2023–present)

== Partner assembly plants ==
=== Hyundai CAOA ===
Hyundai vehicles have also been produced in Brazil by Grupo Caoa at a plant located in Anápolis, Goiás. Production here started with the HR model in 2007, and continued with the Tucson in 2010, the HD78 truck in 2011, and the ix35 in 2013.

=== Hyundai Asia Resources (HARI) ===
Hyundai Asia Resources, Inc. (HARI) was the assembler and distributor of Hyundai passenger cars and commercial vehicles in the Philippines. The company were appointed in August 2001 as the official distributor of Hyundai vehicles in the Philippines. Locally assembled Hyundai models consist of the Hyundai Accent Sedan, Hyundai H350 and the Hyundai H100 vans, all undergo final assembly at Hyundai's Assembly Center (HAC), located at Santa Rosa, Laguna.

=== Handal Indonesia Motor (HIM) ===
PT Hyundai Indonesia Motor (HIM) was established in 1996 as PT Citra Mobil Nasional, assembling Bimantara-badged vehicles based on the Hyundai Accent and Hyundai Elantra. It assembles the Hyundai H-1/Starex in 2010 for domestic market and exports to Thailand, Bhutan, and Brunei. It is renamed to PT Handal Indonesia Motor since November 2020, offering vehicle assembly services to other brands as well.

Although Hyundai has had its own factory in Cikarang since 2021, Handal Indonesia Motor continued to produce the Hyundai Starex until October 2023 for the ASEAN market.

=== Fair Technology Hyundai ===
The Fair Technology Hyundai is a joint venture between Hyundai Motor and Fair Technology, which was established in January 2023. It began operations in Bangladesh by producing the Creta since January 2023. It operates in Bangabandhu Hi-Tech Park, Kaliakair Gazipur.

=== GB Corp ===
Hyundai cars are also assembled in Egypt using CKD kits. The local manufacturer is GB Corp, which is located in Cairo. Their 58,000 sq.m factory possesses an estimated annual production capacity of 50,000 to 75,000 vehicles. Formerly, the company assembled vehicles such as the Verna and Hyundai Elantra HD. As of 2024, the company assembles the Hyundai Elantra AD, and the Hyundai Accent RB.

== Previous plants ==
=== Hyundai Bromont Plant (1989~1993) ===
In 1989, Hyundai Auto Canada Inc. opened a stamping and assembly plant in Bromont, employing 800. The 150,000 m^{2} (1,600,000 sq ft) plant was situated on an 850,000 m^{2} (9,100,000 sq ft) site, with body, paint and trim shops, as well as a pumping station for the plant, a paint residue treatment plant, and administrative offices. The plant cost $387.7 million, with Quebec and Canadian federal government subsidies of $131 million.

The plant was designed to manufacture approximately 2,000 Hyundai Sonatas per week. Subsequently, Chrysler and Hyundai considered a joint venture that would have Chrysler rebranding the Sonata manufactured at Bromont, but later said the deal had failed. The Bromont plant was operational for four years before it closed in 1994, with Hyundai's sales unable to support the plant. Hyundai subsequently sold the plant to Olymbec Inc. It subdivided the plant, leasing the former paint and assembly plant to Goodyear from February 2007. The former metal stamping portion of the plant was leased to AAER Inc., a manufacturer of wind turbines based in Quebec.

=== Hyundai Motor Manufacturing Rus (HMMR) ===
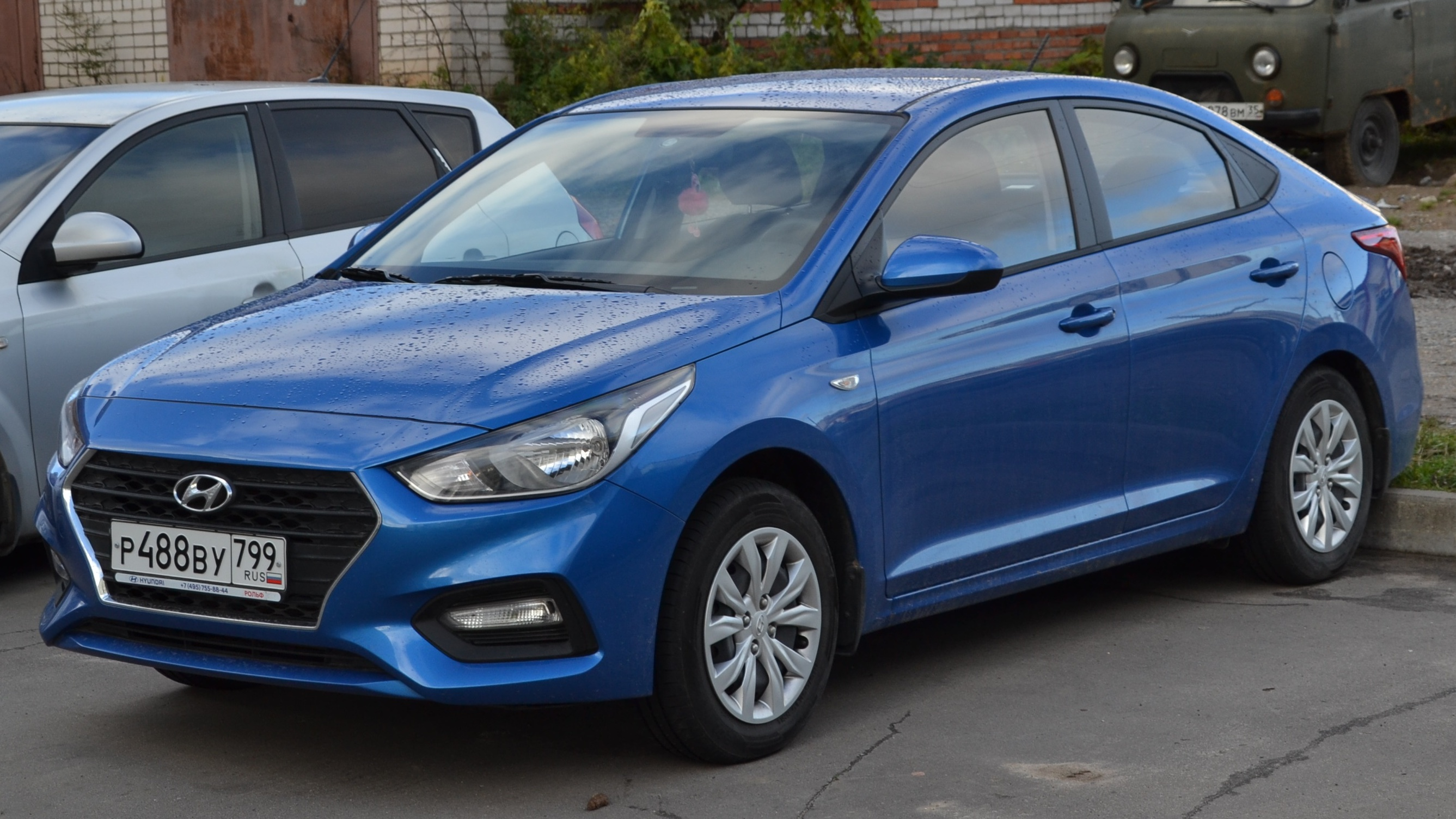
Hyundai Solaris, formerly one of the best-selling foreign cars in Russia.

Located in Saint Petersburg, Hyundai started the construction of the Hyundai Motor Manufacturing Rus (HMMR) plant with a planned yearly capacity of 100,000 cars in June 2008, that will eventually be increased to 200,000 units. It started mass production in January 2011.

In December 2020, Hyundai completed the acquisition of a decommissioned General Motors manufacturing plant in Shushary, Saint Petersburg, making it the second plant for HMMR.

As a result of international sanctions during the Russian invasion of Ukraine, production at the Saint Petersburg plant was halted in March 2022. In September 2023, Hyundai sold the Saint Petersburg factory to AGR Automotive, a subsidiary of Russian company Art-Finans. Assembly operations restarted in mid-2024 under the new ownership, using unassembled kits enough to produce around 70,000 vehicles.

Established	2010
Location	Saint Petersburg, Russia
Area	2,000,000 m^{2} (200 ha; 494 acres)
Plants	2
Employees	2,245
Annual capacity	200,000 vehicles (4% of global output)

==== Previous models ====
- Hyundai Solaris (2011–2022)
- Kia Rio (2011–2022)
- Hyundai Creta (2016–2022)
