= Hyundai Assan Otomotiv =

Automotive company

Hyundai Assan Otomotiv San ve Tic.
- Type: Joint-stock company
- Industry: Automotive
- Founded: 1994
- Headquarters: Alikahya, İzmit, Kocaeli Province, Turkey
- Products: Automobiles, commercial vehicles
- Production output: 230,000 vehicles (2023)
- Revenue: $3.16 billion (2023)
- Owner: Hyundai Motor Company (70%); Kibar Holding (30%)
- Number of employees: 2,384 (2023)
- Website: hyundai.com.tr

The Hyundai Assan Otomotiv San ve Tic. A.Ş. is an automotive company based in Kozyatagi, Istanbul, Turkey, established at the end of 1994, as a joint venture between the Hyundai Motor Company of South Korea and the Kibar Holding of Turkey. It is operating a manufacturing plant located in İzmit, Turkey that was opened in September 1997, and produces Hyundai automobiles and commercial vehicles.

== Overview ==
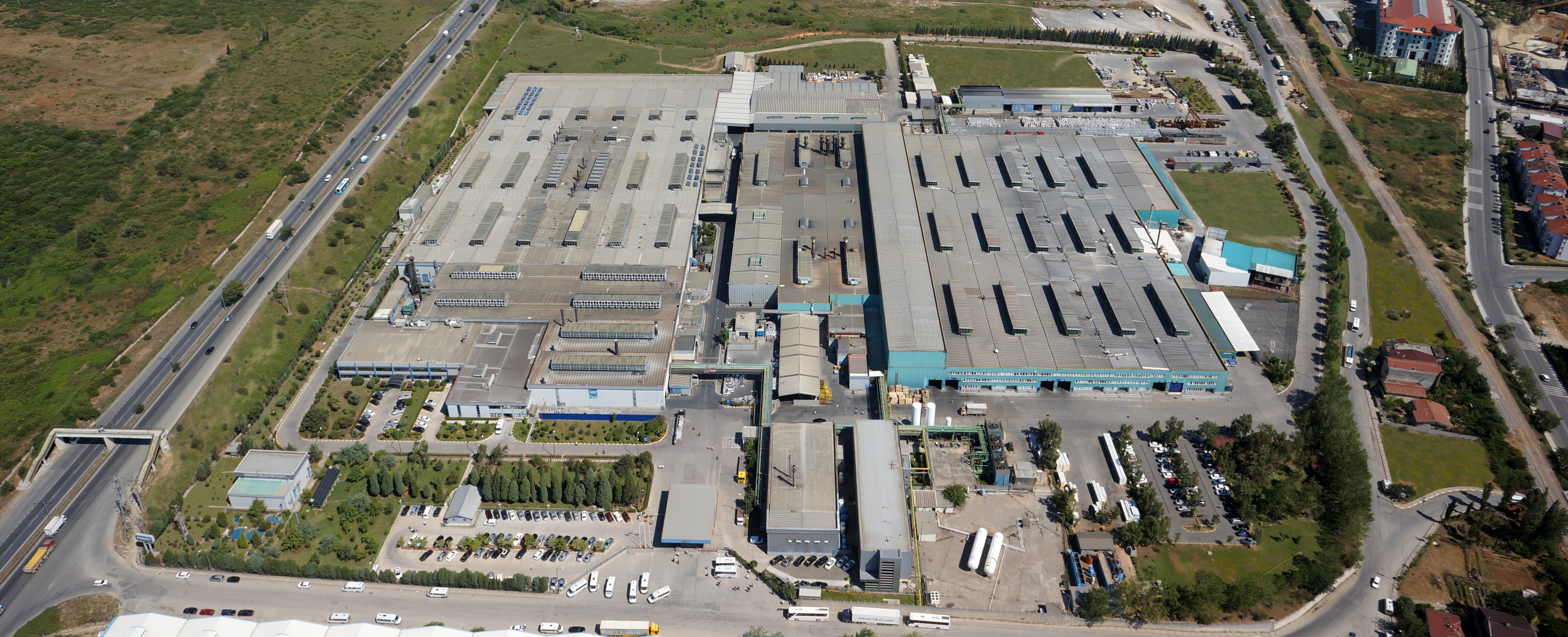
Hyundai Assan Otomotiv

The company was established at the end of 1994, as a 50–50% joint venture between the South Korean manufacturer and the Kibar Holding of Turkey, with the goal of opening a new manufacturing facility in İzmit, after the Hyundai brand's introduction to the country in 1990. The groundbreaking ceremony of the factory was held on 25 September 1995. It was completed and started mass production in July 1997, with the official opening ceremony being held on 20 September 1997.

The factory covers 108,000 m^{2} of the 233,000 m^{2} total area and has an annual production capacity of 210,000 units (increased in 2013 from an initial of 125,000 units, with a US$609 million investment), the company being the fifth-largest automaker in Turkey. The total first stage investment was US$180 million. The first two models produced were the Hyundai Accent and the Grace, the Starex being added to the line-up in 2002, the Matrix in 2007, and the i20 in 2010. On 15 July 2014, the company produced its one millionth vehicle.

Korean car parts companies like Hyundai mobis, Assan hanil and Assan posco stainless mill have plant near Hyundai Assan turkey factory

== Current models in production ==
- Hyundai i20 (2010–present)
- Hyundai Bayon (2021–present)
- Hyundai Ioniq 3 (2026–present)

== Former models in production ==
- Hyundai Accent (1997–2012)
- Hyundai Grace (1997–2006)
- Hyundai Starex (2002–2007)
- Hyundai Matrix (2007–2010)
- Hyundai i10 (2013–2026)

== See also ==
- List of Hyundai Motor Company manufacturing facilities
