= Hyundai Ioniq 3 =

Battery electric supermini car produced by Hyundai

- 2026 Hyundai Ioniq 3 Standard trim

Overview
- Manufacturer: Hyundai
- Model code: BJ1
- Production: August 2026 – present
- Model years: 2027 - present
- Assembly: Turkey: İzmit (HAOS)
- Designer: SangYup Lee

Body and chassis
- Class: Subcompact car (B)
- Body style: 5-door hatchback
- Layout: Front-motor, front-wheel-drive
- Platform: Hyundai E-GMP (400V architecture)
- Related: Kia EV2

Powertrain
- Electric motor: Permanent magnet on Front Axle
- Power output: 99–107 kW (133–143 hp; 135–145 PS)
- Battery: 42.2 or 61 kWh in size, LFP and NMC respectively
- Range: 344–496 km (214–308 mi) (WLTP)

Dimensions
- Wheelbase: 2,680 mm (106 in)
- Length: 4,155–4,170 mm (164–164 in)
- Width: 1,800 mm (71 in)
- Height: 1,505 mm (59 in)
- Kerb weight: 1,550–1,580 kg (3,417–3,483 lb)

The Hyundai Ioniq 3 is a battery electric subcompact car / supermini car produced by South Korean automaker Hyundai since 2026.

It is the fourth product marketed under the electric car-focused Ioniq sub-brand, after the Ioniq 9.

== Development ==
=== Preview ===
The Ioniq 3 is an electric subcompact car, also known in European classification as a "supermini car". As confirmed by Hyundai's European CEO Xavier Martinet, the Ioniq 3 is being built in Turkey, starting in August 2026. Martinet also confirmed that the Ioniq 3 would launch sometime in the third quarter of 2026.

The starting price of the Ioniq 3 was expected to be around €30,000 in Europe, and it uses the Art of Steel design language, which was first introduced with the second generation Hyundai Nexo.

The Ioniq 3 was previewed by the Concept THREE, which was revealed on 8 September 2025, in Munich, Germany.

=== Reveal ===
A year later, on 14 April 2026, the production-spec Ioniq 3 was first teased. A week later, it was unveiled in Milan, Italy, during Milan Design Week on 20 April of the same year, and it stays true to the concept model.

Three months later, it was launched in the Netherlands at the end of July 2026.

== Overview ==
=== Design ===
The Ioniq 3 is Hyundai's first dedicated electric vehicle designed in Europe.

It has some inspiration from the Veloster, which was formerly Hyundai's sports compact car produced from 2011 to 2022, along with the Art of Steel design language, and it features the split headlights with illuminated dots above the grille.

The N-Line variant has a diffuser integrated into the rear bumper and a custom rear spoiler. The A-pillar, roof, side skirts, and cladding are all painted black.

Rear view (standard trim)

N Line

Rear view (N Line)

Interior (N Line)

=== Features ===
The Ioniq 3 has a centre touchscreen with a size of 14.6 inches. Hyundai chose to keep certain physical buttons for the Ioniq 3. Lower trim levels use a 12.9-inch central touchscreen. Hyundai's Android-based Pleos software-defined infotainment system is used like in the Kia PV5. It has an electronic column shifter mounted on the right stalk. Hyundai also designed the center console to be two-story.

=== Powertrain ===
The Ioniq 3 is offered in two powertrains: Standard Range and Long Range. The Standard Range version has an electric motor producing 107 kW (143 hp; 145 PS) paired to a 42.2 kWh battery. It gets a range of 344 kilometres (214 mi) on the WLTP cycle. The Long Range version is less powerful, using a 99 kW (133 hp; 135 PS) motor compared to the 107 kW of the Standard Range. It uses a 61 kWh battery that allows the Long Range version to get a range of 496 kilometres (308 mi) on the same cycle. Both versions have a torque output of 249 N⋅m (25.4 kg⋅m; 184 lb⋅ft) regardless of power output. It is being offered in front-wheel-drive, similar to the Veloster.

It is Hyundai’s first dedicated electric vehicle to feature the 400-volt architecture.

== Production ==
The Ioniq 3 is produced at the Hyundai Assan Otomotiv plant in İzmit, Turkey, where it is built alongside the i10, i20, and Bayon, as the Hyundai’s first dedicated electric vehicle to be assembled in Europe.

Production commenced in August 2026.

== Hyundai Concept Three ==
The Ioniq 3 was previewed at the 2025 Munich Motor Show in Germany as a near-ready concept called the Concept Three (stylised as Concept THREE). The Concept THREE features the Art of Steel design language, equipped with a rear ducktail spoiler and diffuser, a raked visor-shaped glasshouse, and narrow wrap-around lights.

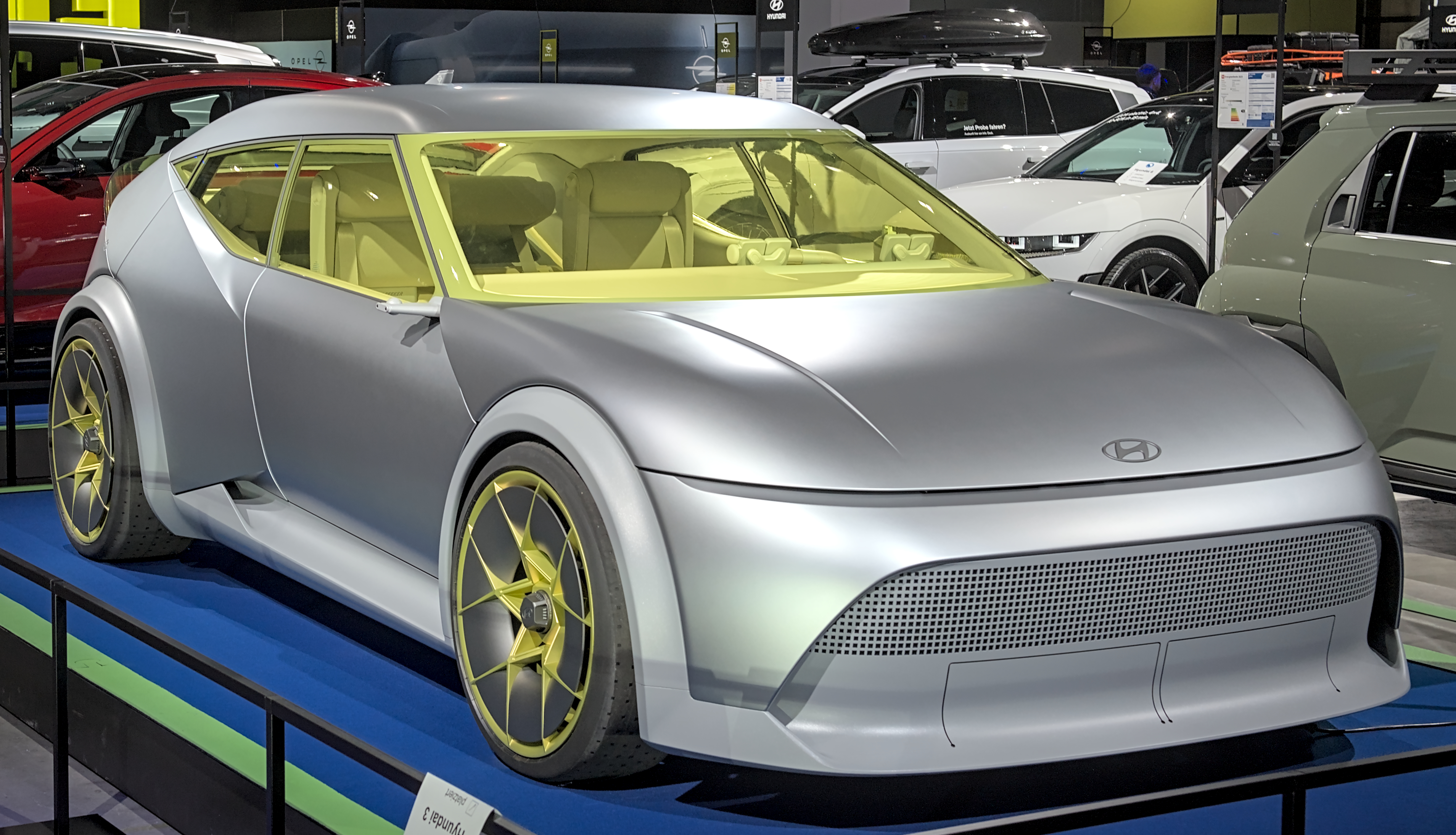
Hyundai Three concept

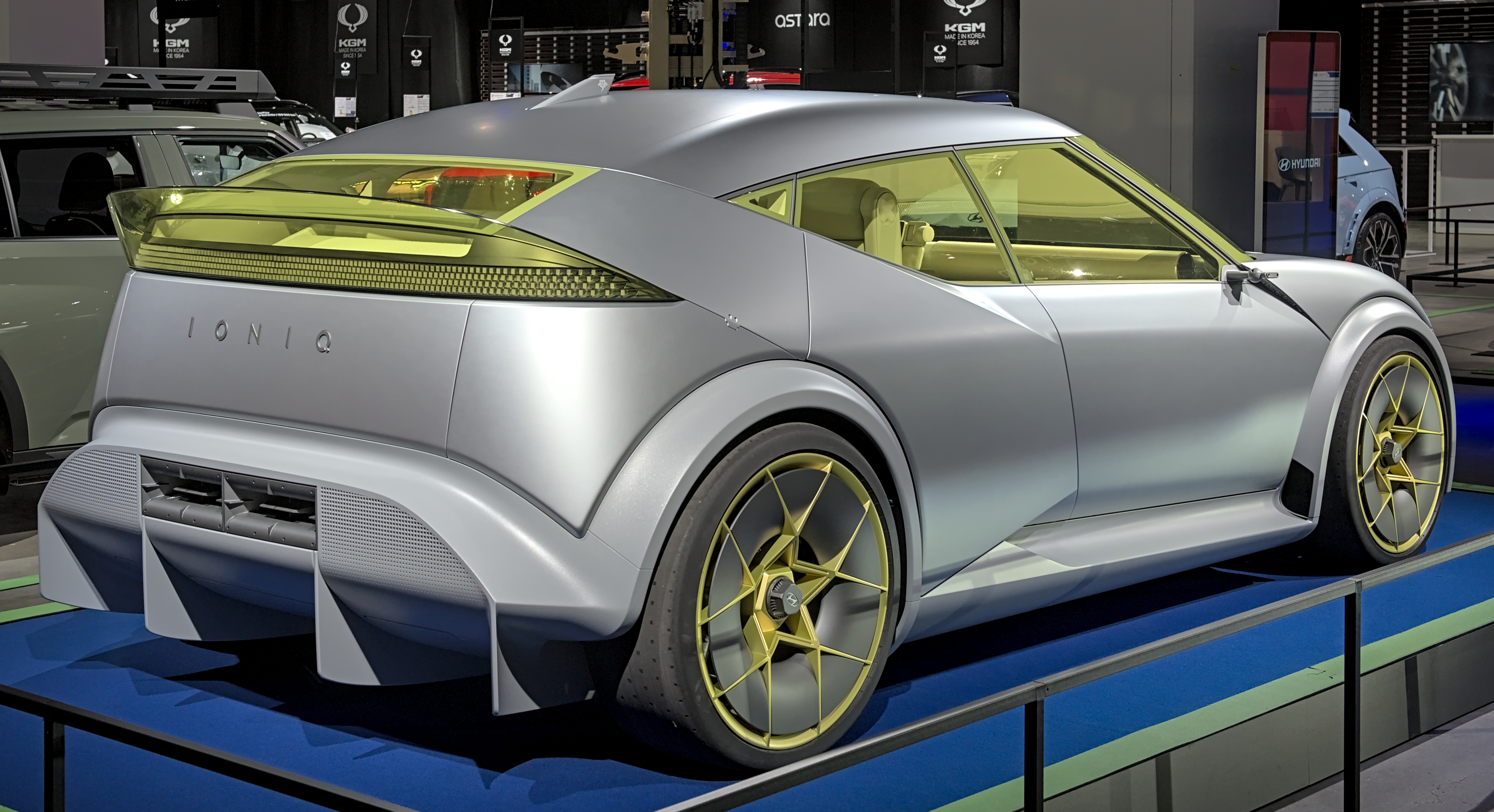
Rear view

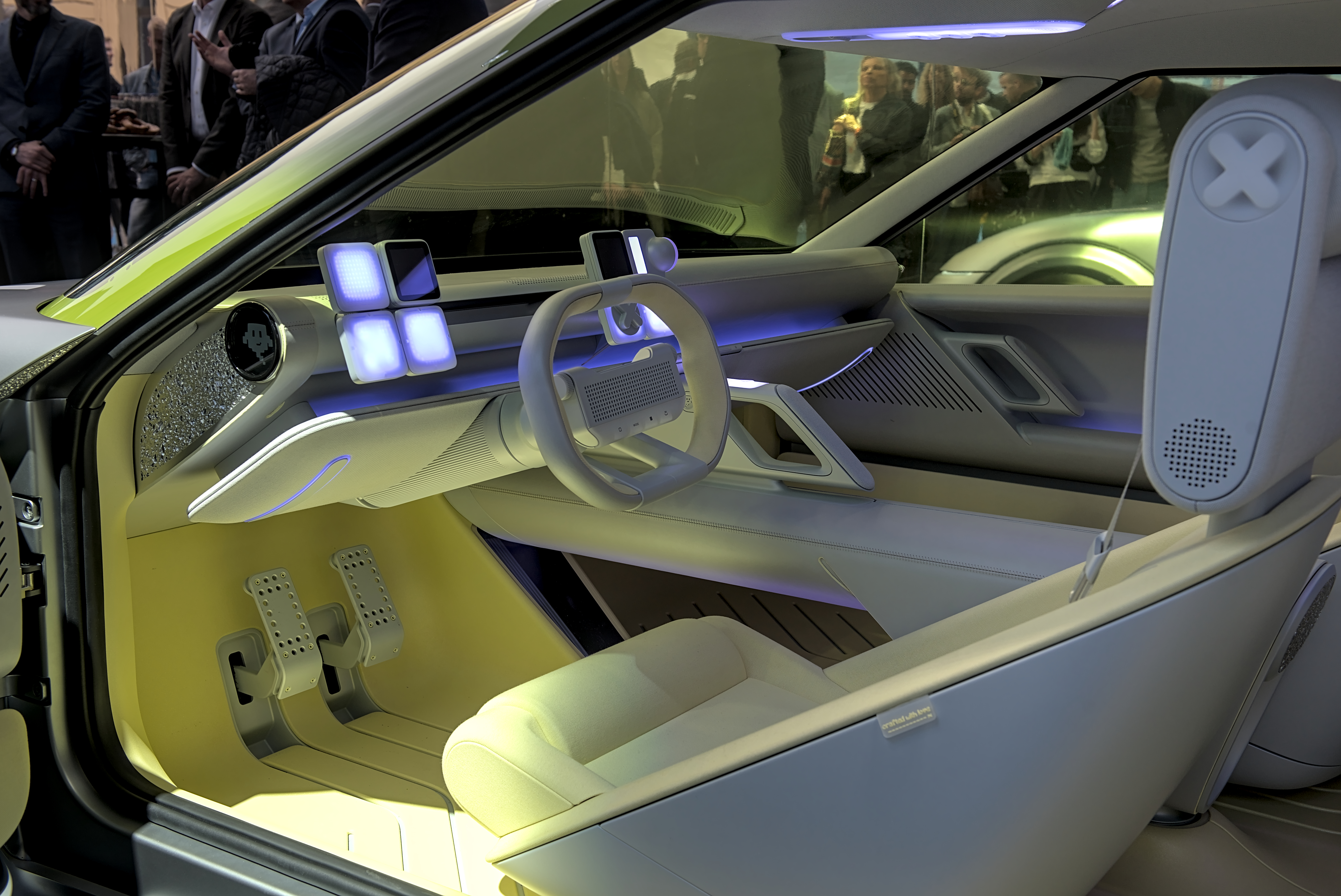
Interior
