= Hyundai Elexio =

Battery electric compact crossover SUV

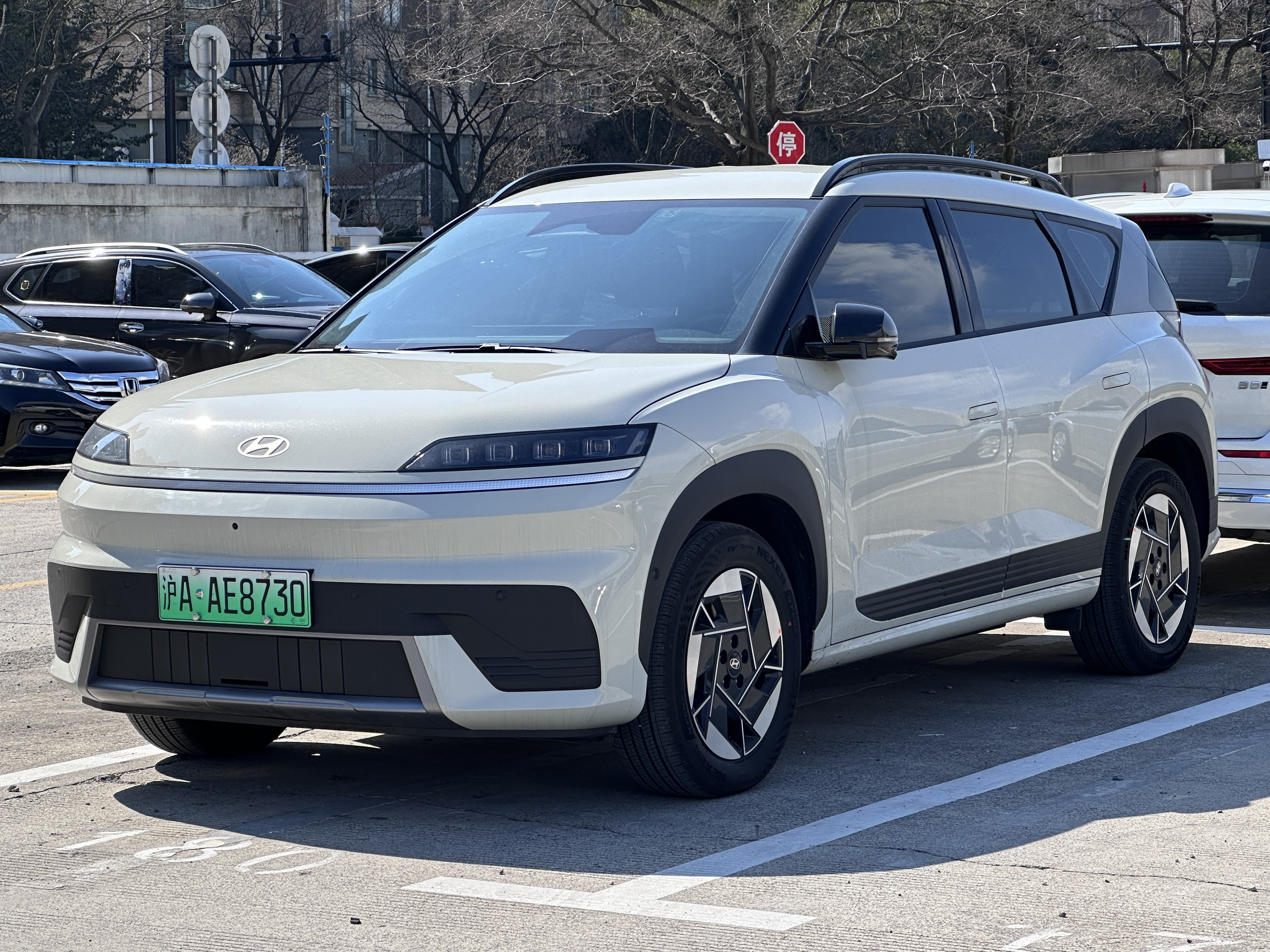

Overview
- Manufacturer: Hyundai
- Model code: OE1
- Also called: Hyundai EO (China)
- Production: October 2025 – present
- Assembly: China: Beijing (Beijing Hyundai)

Body and chassis
- Class: Compact crossover SUV (C)
- Body style: 5-door SUV
- Layout: Front-motor, front-wheel-drive Dual-motor, all-wheel-drive
- Platform: E-GMP (800 V)
- Related: Hyundai Ioniq 5; Hyundai Ioniq 6; Hyundai Ioniq 9; Kia EV5; Kia EV6; Kia EV9

Powertrain
- Electric motor: 160 kW EM16 (front), 73 kW EM07 (rear)
- Power output: 214–312 hp (160–233 kW; 217–316 PS)
- Battery: 64.2 kWh LFP FinDreams; 88.1 kWh LFP FinDreams
- Electric range: 540–722 km (336–449 mi) (CLTC)

Dimensions
- Wheelbase: 2,750 mm (108.3 in)
- Length: 4,615 mm (181.7 in)
- Width: 1,875 mm (73.8 in)
- Height: 1,673 mm (65.9 in)
- Curb weight: 1,884–2,184 kg (4,154–4,815 lb)

The Hyundai Elexio, alternatively the Hyundai EO (Chinese: 现代羿欧; pinyin: Xiàndài Yìōu) in China, is a battery electric compact crossover SUV manufactured by Hyundai through its Beijing Hyundai joint venture in China since 2025.

It is China's alternative to the Ioniq 5 due to its segment, but it has a longer length along with a longer wheelbase.

== Overview ==
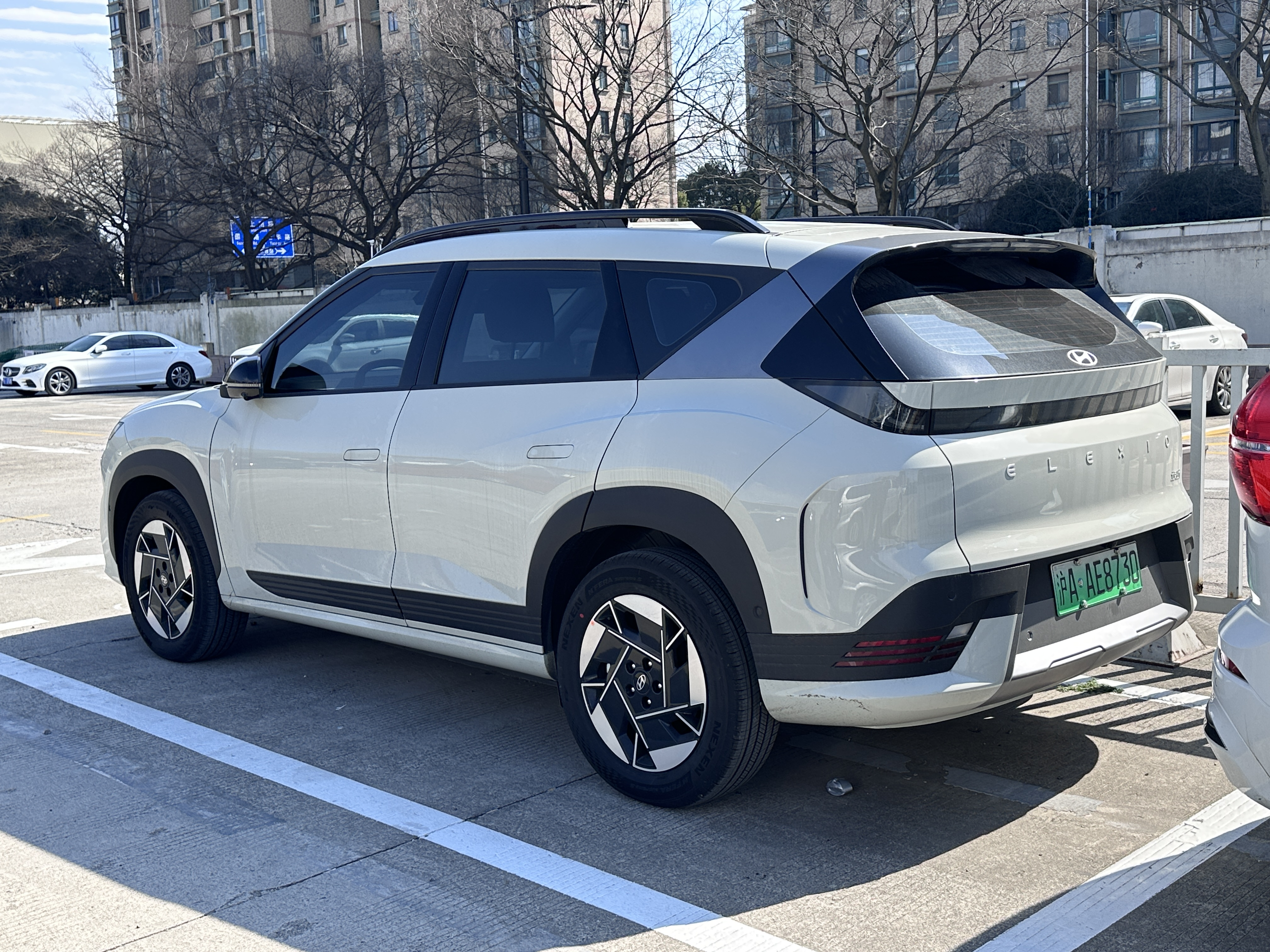
Rear view

Development was led by Hyundai's R&D center in Shanghai. It was expected to launch in 2026 but the launch was rescheduled to early 2025. The model's original name (Elexio) was revealed on 1 May 2025. It is not available in the South Korean market where most Ioniq models are produced. The related sister-model Kia EV5 was offered instead.

The Elexio was officially unveiled on 7 May 2025.

The model has full-width light bars on both ends. The rear light bar has slight curvatures at the rear.

A 27-inch HUD is expected to come with the Elexio. The infotainment system will be powered by a Qualcomm Snapdragon 8295 chip. An advanced ADAS system developed by Huawei will also be utilized.

In August 2025, the model was renamed as the Hyundai EO in China and the launch date was revealed as of September 2025.

Production commenced on 16 October 2025, with pre-sales set to commence on the same day. Later that month, it was announced that Hyundai would sell the vehicle in Australia under its original Elexio name.

== Powertrain ==
The model is based on a 800V electrical architecture. It has a choice of two FinDreams-supplied LFP battery packs, either 64.2 kWh or 88.112 kWh capable of CLTC ranges up to 540 and 722 km (336 and 449 mi), respectively. The Elexio can be fast-charged from 30% to 80% in 27 minutes. Power output ranges from 214 horsepower (160 kW; 217 PS) in the FWD version to 312 horsepower (233 kW; 316 PS) in the AWD version.

Specifications
Battery		Motor		Power	Torque	Range		Charging		0–100 km/h (62 mph)	Top speed	Kerb weight
Type	Weight	Front	Rear	Power	Torque	WLTP	CLTC	30–80%	10–80%	0–100 km/h (62 mph)	Top speed	Kerb weight
64.2 kWh LFP FinDreams	428 kg (944 lb)	160 kW EM16 310 N·m PMSM	—	214 hp (160 kW; 217 PS)	310 N⋅m (229 lb⋅ft)		540 km (336 mi)	27 min	36 min	10.7 sec	185 km/h (115 mph)	1,884 kg (4,154 lb)
88.112 kWh LFP FinDreams	573 kg (1,263 lb)	160 kW EM16 310 N·m PMSM	—	214 hp (160 kW; 217 PS)	310 N⋅m (229 lb⋅ft)	562 km (349 mi)	722 km (449 mi)	27 min	38 min	12.1 sec	185 km/h (115 mph)	2,039 kg (4,495 lb)
88.112 kWh LFP FinDreams	573 kg (1,263 lb)	160 kW EM16 310 N·m PMSM	73 kW EM07 170 N·m PMSM	313 hp (233 kW; 317 PS)	480 N⋅m (354 lb⋅ft)		590 km (367 mi)	27 min	38 min		185 km/h (115 mph)	2,184 kg (4,815 lb)

== Markets ==
=== Australia ===
The Elexio was launched in Australia on 6 January 2026, in the sole Elite variant powered by the 88.1 kWh battery pack and is only available in front-wheel-drive.

=== Cambodia ===
The Elexio was launched in Cambodia on 29 August 2026, with two variants: Smart and Tech, powered by the 64.2 kWh battery pack and front-wheel-drive.

=== Singapore ===
The Elexio is expected to launch in Singapore in September 2026, in a front-wheel drive variant.

== Safety ==
ANCAP test results Hyundai Elexio all variants (2024, aligned with Euro NCAP)
Test	Points	%
Overall:	5 /5 stars	
Adult occupant:	35.47	88%
Child occupant:	42.41	86%
Pedestrian:	48.60	77%
Safety assist:	15.42	85%

== Sales ==
Year	China
2025	560
