= Kia EV5 =

Battery electric mid-size crossover SUV

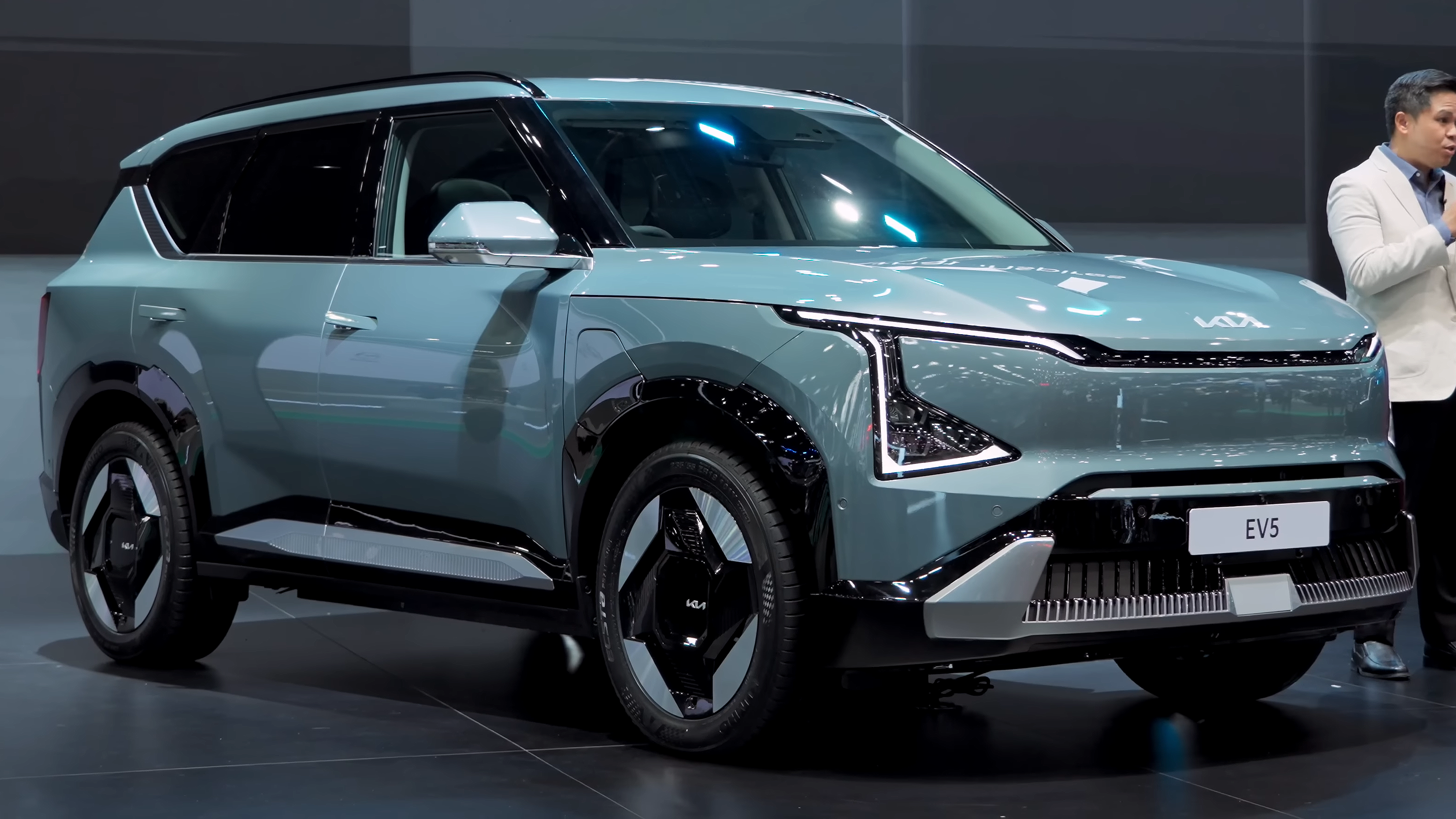
- 2024 Kia EV5 (Chinese production)

Overview
- Manufacturer: Kia
- Model code: OV
- Production: 2023–present (China); 2025–present (South Korea)
- Assembly: South Korea: Gwangju (Gwangju Plant); China: Yancheng (Jiangsu Yueda Kia Motors); Singapore: Jurong (HMGICS)

Body and chassis
- Class: Mid-size crossover SUV (D)
- Body style: 5-door SUV
- Layout: Front-motor, front-wheel-drive; Dual-motor, all-wheel-drive
- Platform: Hyundai-Kia N3 eK (China); E-GMP 400V Architecture (South Korea)

Powertrain
- Electric motor: Permanent magnet synchronous
- Power output: 160–230 kW (215–308 hp; 218–313 PS)
- Battery: 60.3 kWh NMC CATL; 64.2 kWh LFP FinDreams; 81.4 kWh NMC CATL; 88.1 kWh LFP FinDreams
- Electric range: 400–555 km (249–345 mi) (WLTP); 490–665 km (304–413 mi) (NEDC); 530–720 km (329–447 mi) (CLTC)
- Plug-in charging: AC: 7-11 kW; DC: 102-141 kW

Dimensions
- Wheelbase: 2,750 mm (108.3 in)
- Length: 4,610 mm (181.5 in)
- Width: 1,875 mm (73.8 in)
- Height: 1,680 mm (66.1 in)
- Curb weight: 1,870–2,229 kg (4,123–4,914 lb)

The Kia EV5 is a battery electric (D-segment) mid-size crossover SUV produced by South Korean manufacturer Kia since 2023.

It was first introduced in March 2023 as a concept form, and announced as a production form in August 2023. It is the third model in the manufacturer's "EV" battery electric vehicle range after the EV6 and EV9. It is also the first battery electric vehicle that will be exported by Kia from China, being produced by the joint venture Jiangsu Yueda Kia Motors.

It is the younger sibling to the EV9 due to its similar styling, and as the name suggests, the EV5 features two-row seating and a 5-seater layout.

It is Kia’s first dedicated electric vehicle to feature the 400-volt architecture.

== Overview ==
A concept car previewing the production version was revealed in China on 20 March 2023, at the brand's EV Day event. The concept uses sustainable materials throughout the interior, including plant-based materials such as seaweed extract and recycled plastic bottles used on the seat trim, headliner and door and dashboard linings.

The production version of the EV5 was released in August 2023 at the Chengdu Motor Show. The model was designed using Kia's 'Opposites United' design language, also featuring a new version of the brand's trademark 'Digital Tiger Face', incorporating a new lighting signature.

In the Chinese market, the EV5 is powered by a lithium iron phosphate (LFP) battery produced by FinDreams, and a 160 kW (215 hp; 218 PS) electric motor with 310 N⋅m (31.6 kg⋅m; 229 lb⋅ft) maximum torque. For the South Korean-made and export markets, the EV5 will be equipped with a nickel-manganese-cobalt (NMC) batteries supplied by CATL with a capacity of up to 82 kWh.

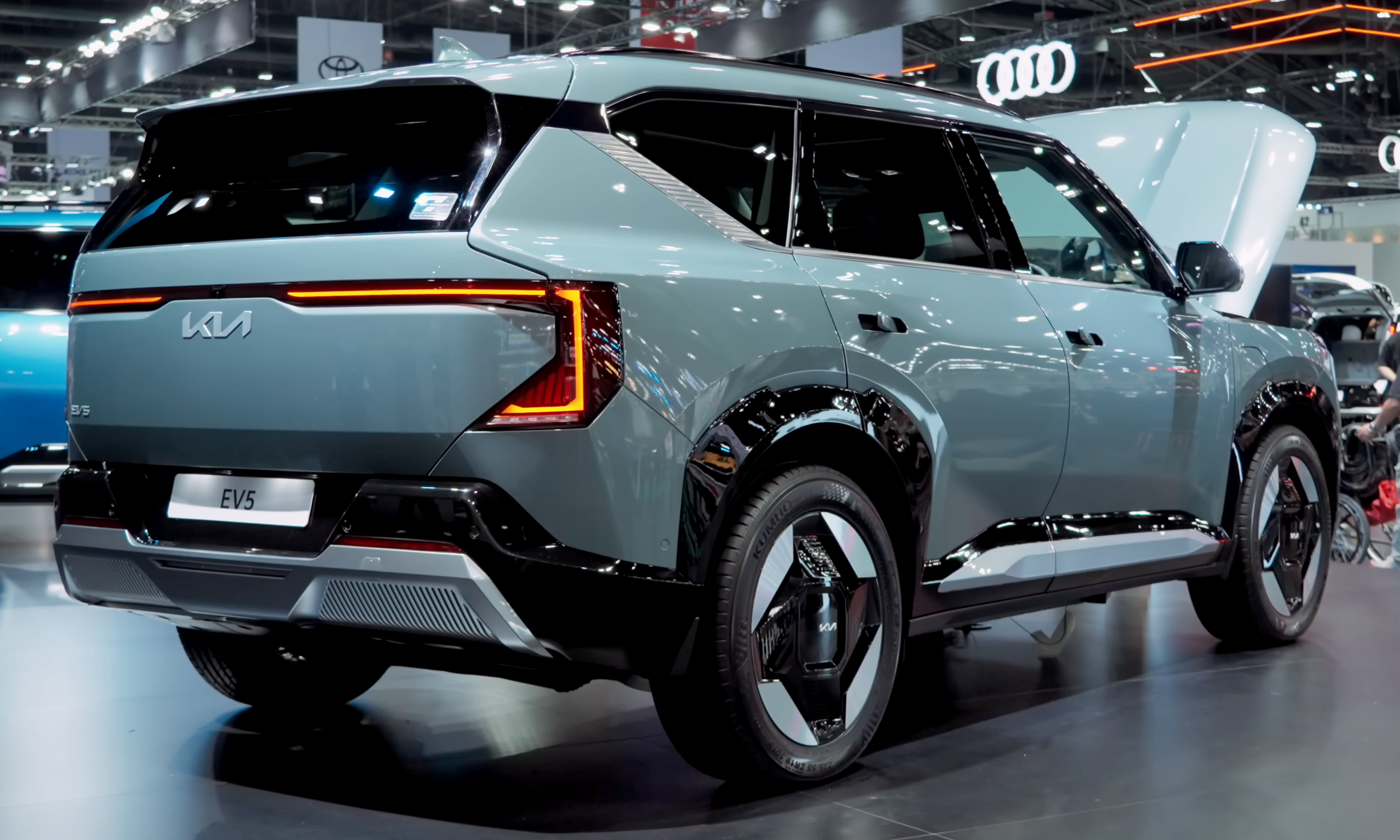
Rear view (Chinese production)

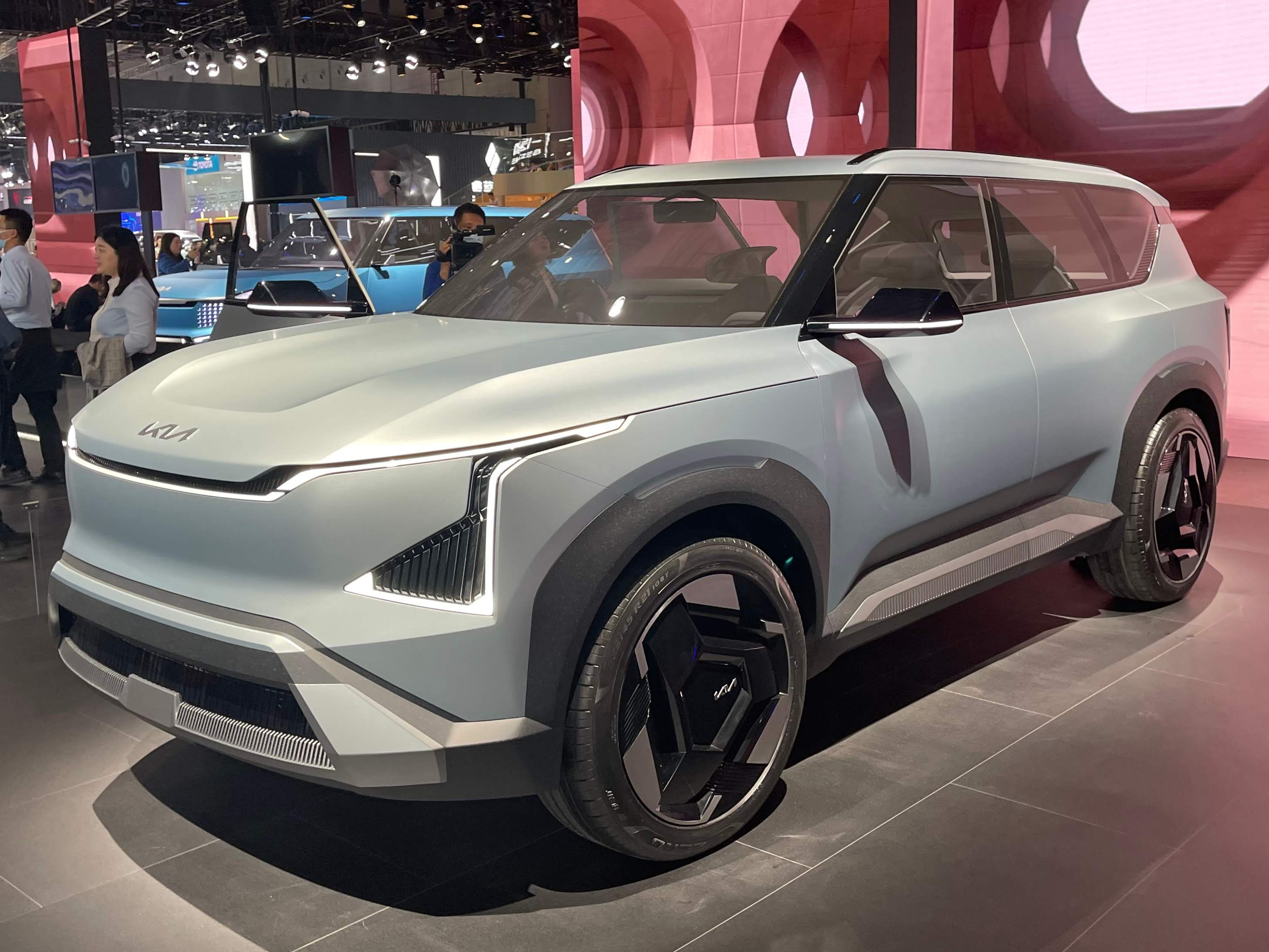
EV5 Concept

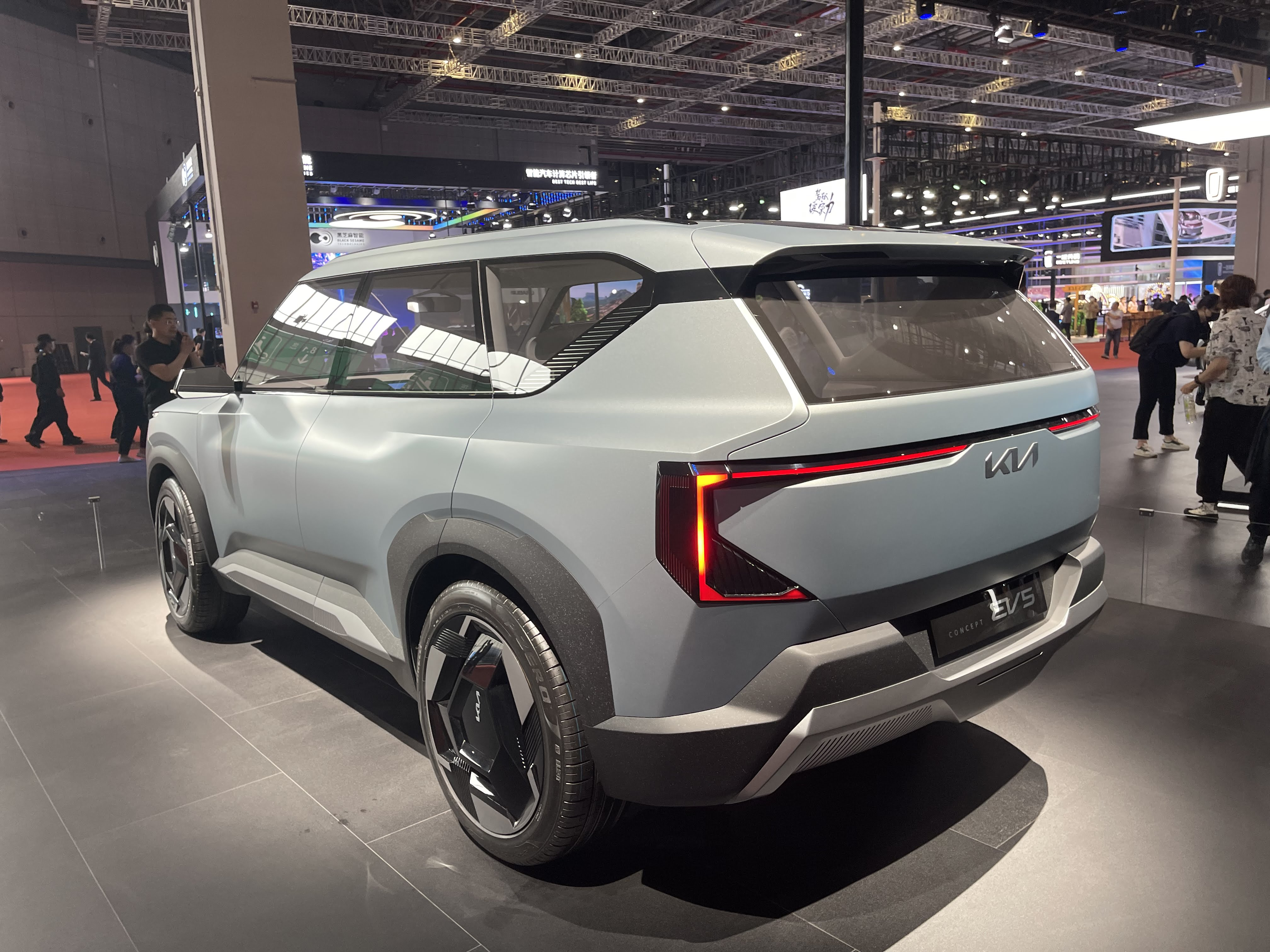
Rear view (Concept)

=== GT-Line ===
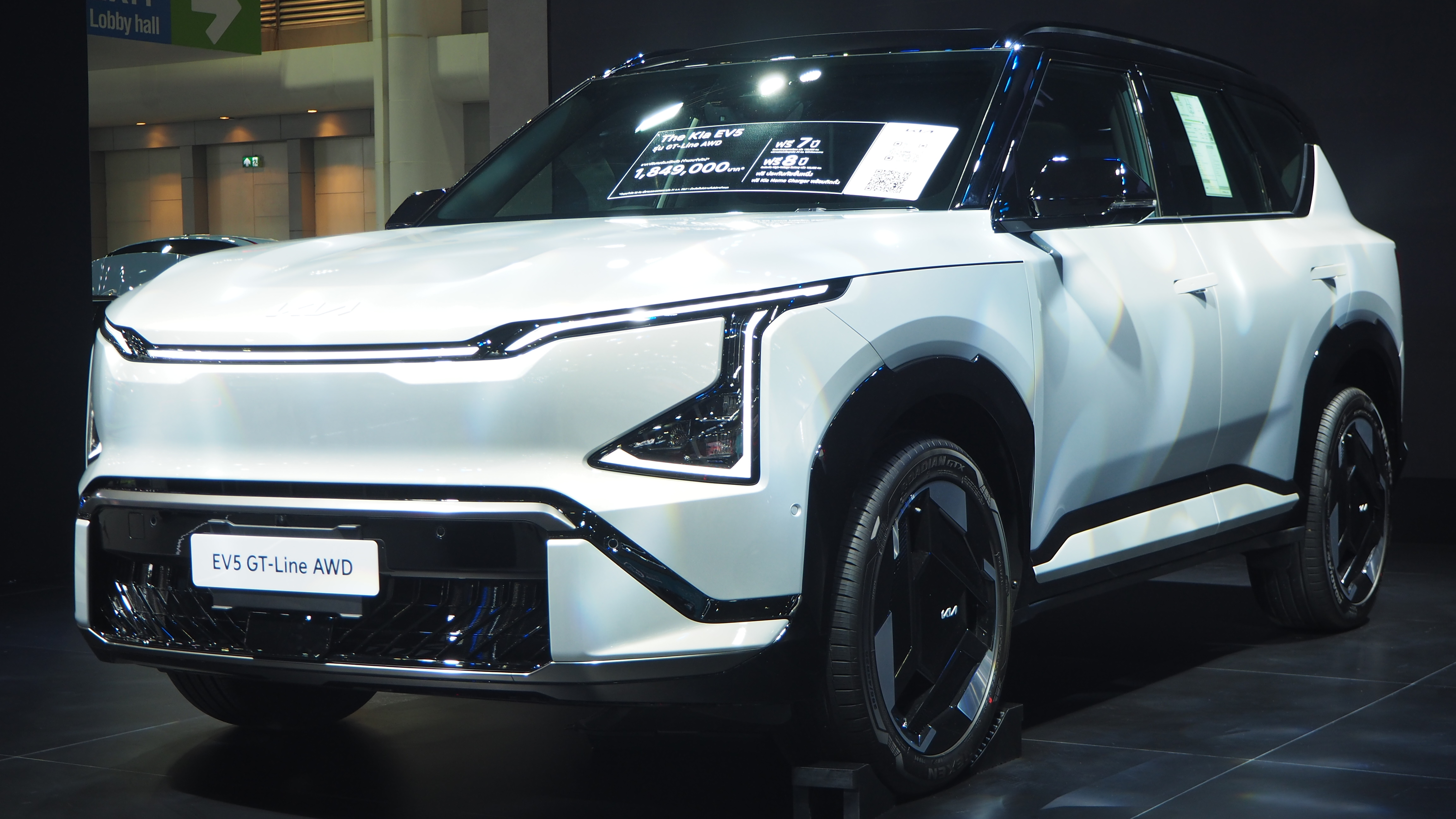
EV5 GT Line (Thailand; Chinese production)

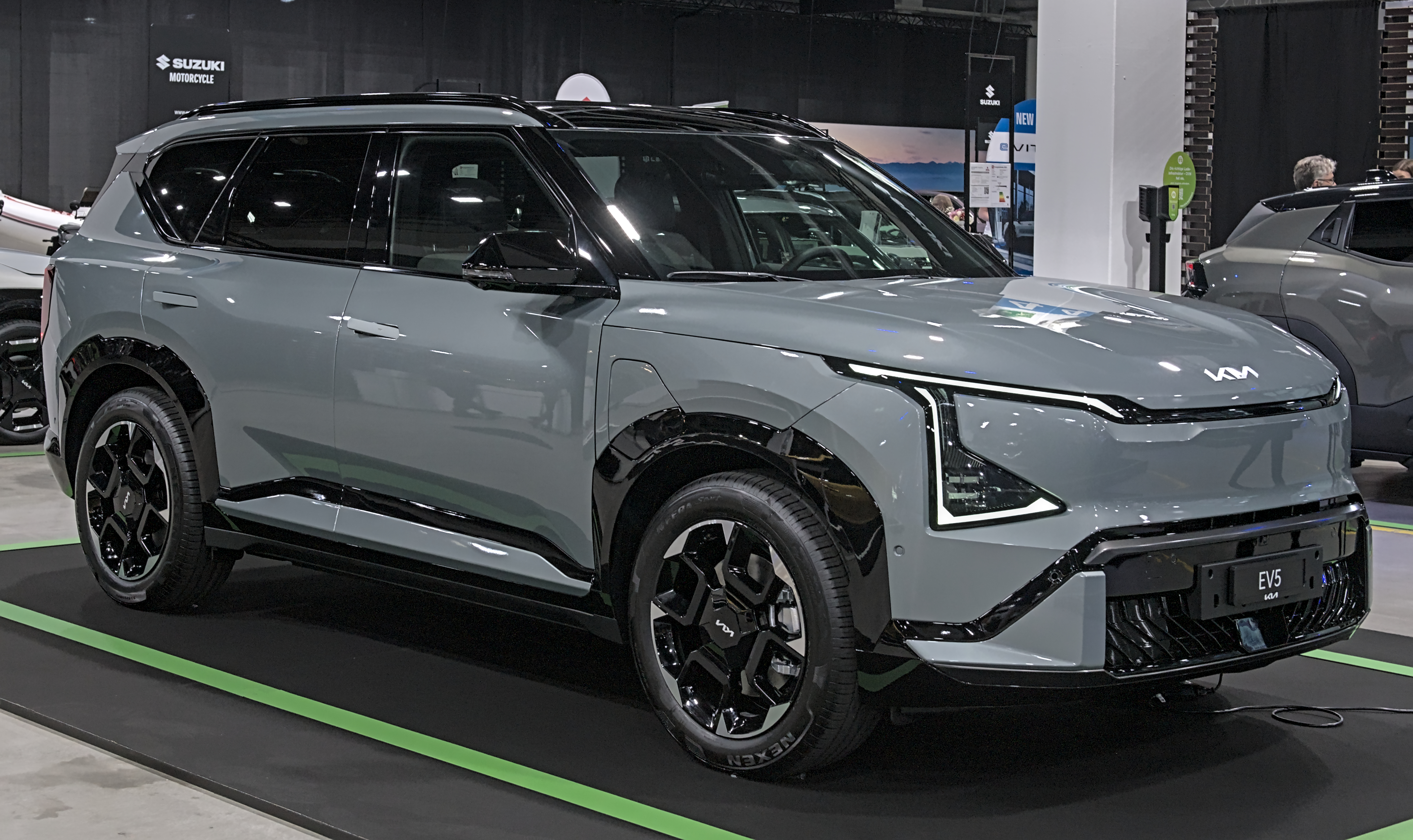
EV5 GT Line (Europe; Korean production)

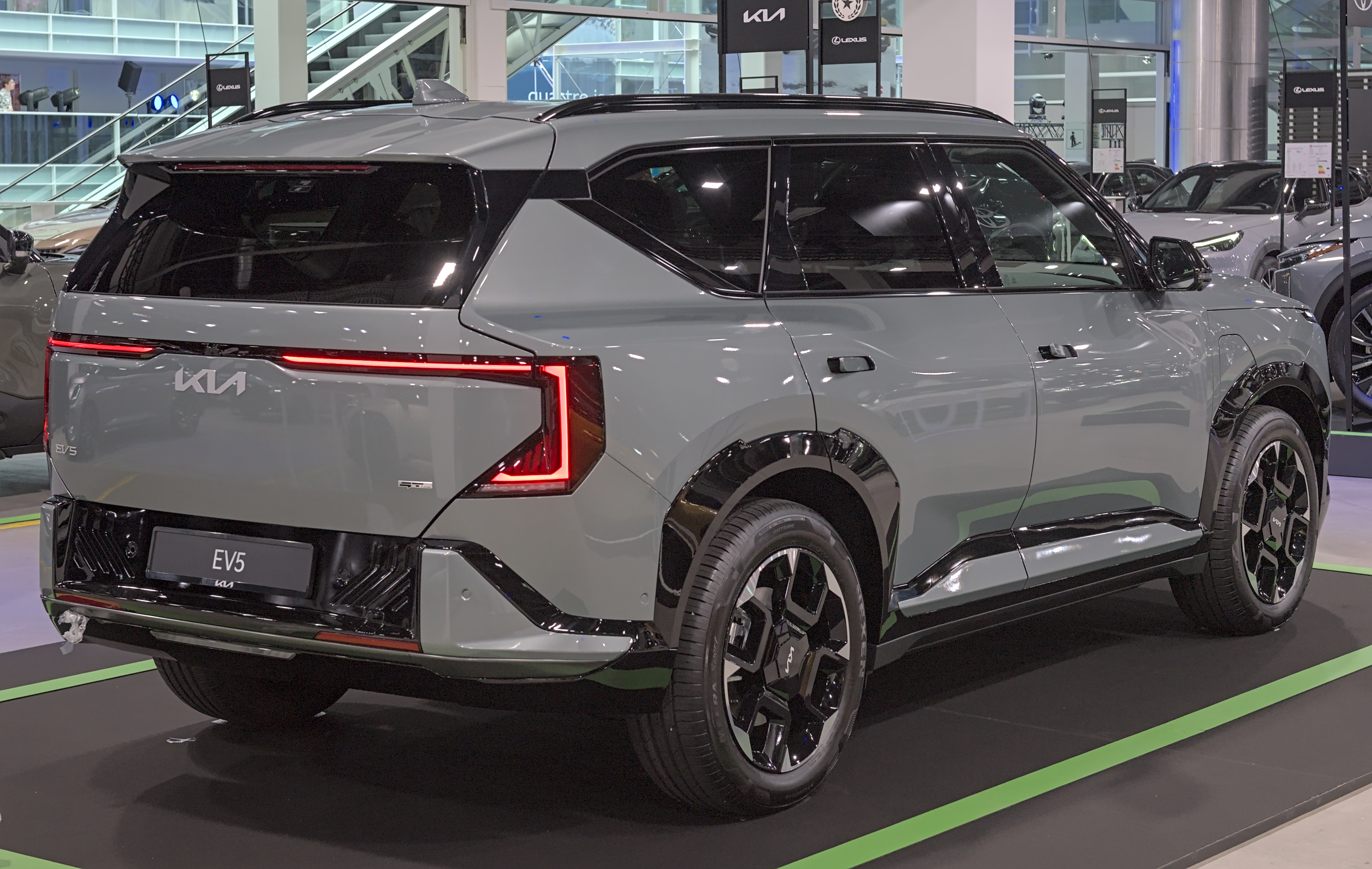
Rear view (GT Line; Europe; Korean production)

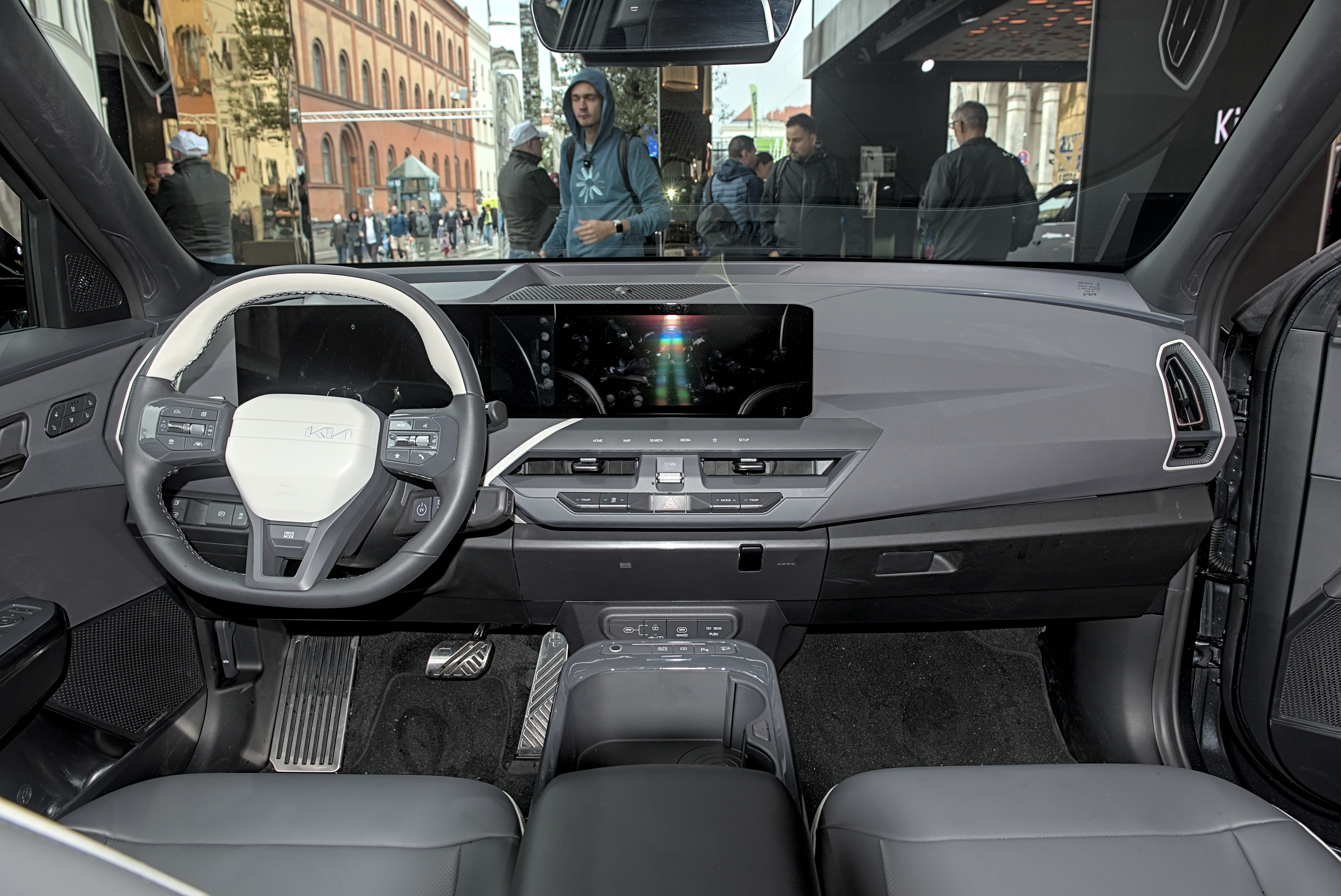
Interior

=== EV5 GT ===
The EV5 GT was released on 9 January 2026; it is a high-performance version of the EV5.

EV5 GT

== Markets ==
=== Africa ===
==== Morocco ====
The EV5 was launched in Morocco on 5 September 2024.

=== Asia ===
==== Korea ====
The EV5 was launched in South Korea on 3 September 2025. In Korea, it is offered with the 81.4 kWh nickel manganese cobalt (NMC) battery pack produced by CATL, and assembled in the Gwangju Plant in South Korea for the domestic and export markets.

==== Pakistan ====
The EV5 was launched in Pakistan on 25 October 2024. In Pakistan, it is available in two variants: Air (2WD) and Earth (AWD).

==== Philippines ====
The EV5 was launched in the Philippines on 9 April 2026, imported from China with two variants: GL (64.2 kWh) and GLS (88.1 kWh).

==== Singapore ====
The EV5 was introduced in Singapore at the 2025 Singapore Motor Show on 8 January 2025, and was confirmed to be the first Kia model to be assembled at the Hyundai Motor Group Innovation Center Singapore (HMGICS) facility. The EV5 was launched in Singapore on 29 May 2025, with three trim levels: Air, Earth and GT Line. The Air trim uses the 64.2 kWh battery pack, while the Earth and GT Line use the 88.1 kWh battery pack. The Air and Earth trims with a power output less than 110 kW (148 hp; 150 PS) are eligible for the cheaper Category A Certificate of Entitlement (COE) bracket, while the GT Line trim is eligible for the Category B bracket.

==== Thailand ====
The EV5 went on sale in Thailand on 26 March 2024. The country became the first EV5 export destination from China. Two powertrains are offered in Thailand, which include a 160 kW (215 hp; 218 PS) front-wheel drive version (for Light, Air and Earth Long Range trims) and the top-spec Earth Exclusive trim with dual-motor all-wheel drive rated at 230 kW (308 hp; 313 PS). The GT Line AWD variant was added in November 2024.

=== Europe ===
The EV5 was unveiled for the European market on 8 July 2025, with sales commencing in the final quarter of 2025. The European-spec models use the nickel manganese cobalt (NMC) batteries for increased electric range and cold weather performance, the interior features a traditional centre console setup with a two front seat arrangement instead of a front bench seat option, and sourced from the Gwangju Plant in South Korea. In Europe, the EV5 is available with three trim levels: Air, GT Line and GT Line S, with all variants use the 81.4 kWh battery pack. The peak DC fast charging rate is 150 kW, with a 10–80% charge time of approximately 30 minutes when connected to a compatible 400-volt charger delivering at least 150 kW.

=== Latin America ===
==== Brazil ====
The EV5 made its Latin American debut in Brazil on 2 September 2024, in the sole variant using the 88.1 kWh battery pack.

=== North America ===
==== Canada ====
The EV5 was introduced in Canada at the 2025 Canadian International Auto Show in Toronto, and it was launched in Spring 2026 as a 2027 model year with an NACS port. Kia confirmed the EV5 will not be sold in the United States or Mexico. The Canadian market EV5 will be available in a variety of trim levels and features, including Light FWD, Wind FWD, Wind AWD, Land FWD, Land AWD, GT-Line FWD, GT-Line AWD, GT-Line Limited FWD, and GT-Line Limited AWD.

=== Oceania ===
==== Australia ====
The EV5 was launched in Australia on 14 October 2024 with four variants available: Air 2WD Standard Range, Air 2WD Long Range, Earth AWD Long Range and GT Line AWD Long Range.

==== New Zealand ====
Pricing and specifications for the EV5 were announced in July 2024, with deliveries beginning in September 2024. Five variants are available: Light, Light+, Earth, Earth AWD and GT Line AWD; all variants use an 88 kWh battery pack.

== Safety ==
=== ANCAP ===
ANCAP test results Kia EV5 all variants (2024, aligned with Euro NCAP)
| Test | Points | % |
|---|---|---|
| Overall: | 5 /5 stars | |
| Adult occupant: | 35.47 | 88% |
| Child occupant: | 42.41 | 86% |
| Pedestrian: | 46.96 | 74% |
| Safety assist: | 14.79 | 82% |

=== Euro NCAP ===
Euro NCAP test results Kia EV5 160kW 4x2 (LHD) (2025)
| Test | Points | % |
|---|---|---|
| Overall: | 5 /5 stars | |
| Adult occupant: | 33.3 | 83% |
| Child occupant: | 42.0 | 85% |
| Pedestrian: | 47.2 | 74% |
| Safety assist: | 14.4 | 80% |

== Powertrain ==
| Type | Battery | Layout | Electric motor | | Power | Torque | 0–100 km/h (0–62 mph) | Top speed | Range | | | Peak DCFC rate | Calendar years | Note |
| Type | Battery | Layout | Electric motor | | Power | Torque | 0–100 km/h (0–62 mph) | Top speed | WLTP | CLTC | NEDC | Peak DCFC rate | Calendar years | Note |
|---|---|---|---|---|---|---|---|---|---|---|---|---|---|---|
| Standard Range | 64.2 kWh LFP | FWD | Front | PMSM | 160 kW (215 hp; 218 PS) | 310 N⋅m (31.6 kg⋅m; 229 lb⋅ft) | 8.5 seconds | 185 km/h (115 mph) | 400 km (249 mi) | 530 km (329 mi) | 490 km (304 mi) | 102 kW | 2023–present | |
| Long Range | 88.1 kWh LFP | FWD | Front | PMSM | 160 kW (215 hp; 218 PS) | 310 N⋅m (31.6 kg⋅m; 229 lb⋅ft) | 8.9 seconds | 185 km/h (115 mph) | 540–555 km (336–345 mi) | 720 km (447 mi) | 665 km (413 mi) | 141 kW | 2023–present | |
| Long Range | 81.4 kWh NMC | FWD | Front | PMSM | 160 kW (215 hp; 218 PS) | 310 N⋅m (31.6 kg⋅m; 229 lb⋅ft) | 8.4 seconds | 185 km/h (115 mph) | 530 km (329 mi) | N/A | N/A | 120 kW | 2025–present | South Korea & Europe |
| AWD | 88.1 kWh LFP | AWD | Front | PMSM | 160 kW (215 hp; 218 PS) | 310 N⋅m (31.6 kg⋅m; 229 lb⋅ft) | 6.1 seconds | 185 km/h (115 mph) | 500 km (311 mi) | N/A | 620 km (385 mi) | 141 kW | 2024–present | Not available in China |
| AWD | 88.1 kWh LFP | AWD | Rear | PMSM | 70 kW (94 hp; 95 PS) | 170 N⋅m (17.3 kg⋅m; 125 lb⋅ft) | 6.1 seconds | 185 km/h (115 mph) | 500 km (311 mi) | N/A | 620 km (385 mi) | 141 kW | 2024–present | Not available in China |
| AWD | 88.1 kWh LFP | AWD | Combined: | | 230 kW (308 hp; 313 PS) | 480 N⋅m (48.9 kg⋅m; 354 lb⋅ft) | 6.1 seconds | 185 km/h (115 mph) | 500 km (311 mi) | N/A | 620 km (385 mi) | 141 kW | 2024–present | Not available in China |
| GT Line AWD | 88.1 kWh LFP | AWD | Front | PMSM | 160 kW (215 hp; 218 PS) | 310 N⋅m (31.6 kg⋅m; 229 lb⋅ft) | 6.3 seconds | 185 km/h (115 mph) | 470–475 km (292–295 mi) | N/A | 555 km (345 mi) | 141 kW | 2024–present | Not available in China |
| GT Line AWD | 88.1 kWh LFP | AWD | Rear | PMSM | 70 kW (94 hp; 95 PS) | 170 N⋅m (17.3 kg⋅m; 125 lb⋅ft) | 6.3 seconds | 185 km/h (115 mph) | 470–475 km (292–295 mi) | N/A | 555 km (345 mi) | 141 kW | 2024–present | Not available in China |
| GT Line AWD | 88.1 kWh LFP | AWD | Combined: | | 230 kW (308 hp; 313 PS) | 480 N⋅m (48.9 kg⋅m; 354 lb⋅ft) | 6.3 seconds | 185 km/h (115 mph) | 470–475 km (292–295 mi) | N/A | 555 km (345 mi) | 141 kW | 2024–present | Not available in China |

== Sales ==
| Year | China | Thailand |
|---|---|---|
| 2023 | 451 | |
| 2024 | 4,665 | 416 |
| 2025 | 3,307 | |
