= Hyundai Bayon =

Subcompact crossover hatchback

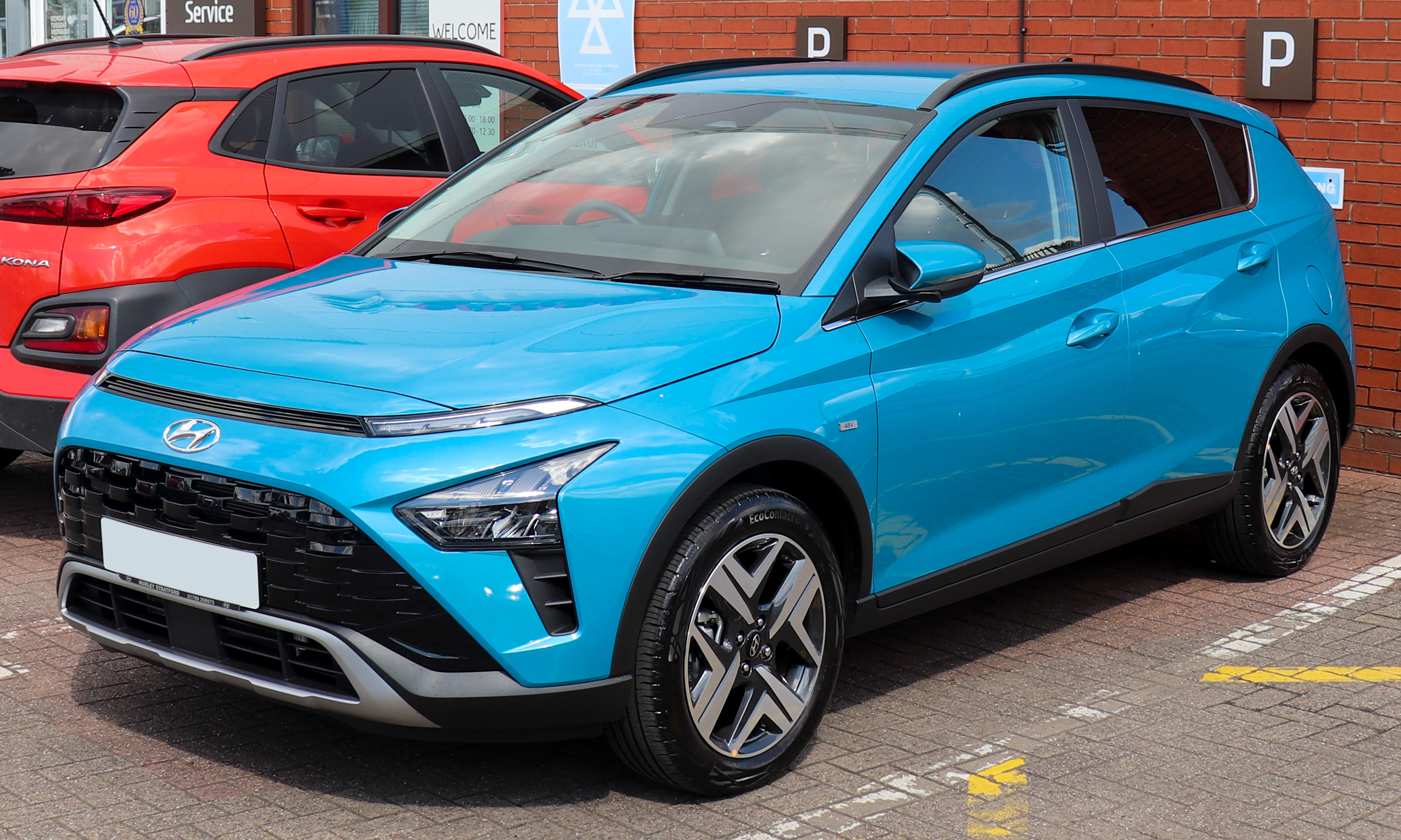
- Hyundai Bayon (pre-facelift)

Overview
- Manufacturer: Hyundai
- Production: 2021–present

Body and chassis
- Class: Subcompact crossover hatchback (B)
- Body style: 5-door crossover hatchback
- Layout: Front-engine, front-wheel-drive

Chronology
- Predecessor: Hyundai i20 Active

The Hyundai Bayon is a subcompact crossover hatchback produced by the South Korean manufacturer Hyundai. The Bayon is based on the i20 and is similarly offered with front-wheel drive.

It is Hyundai's smallest SUV in their European line-up and slots below the Kona.

Designed primarily for the European market, the vehicle's name is a reference to the French city of Bayonne.

== First generation (BC3; 2021) ==
First generation
- Hyundai Bayon (pre-facelift)

Overview
- Model code: BC3 CUV
- Production: 2021–present
- Assembly: Turkey: İzmit (Hyundai Assan)
- Designer: Under the lead of SangYup Lee

Body and chassis
- Platform: Hyundai-Kia K2
- Related: Hyundai i20 (BC3)

Powertrain
- Engine: Petrol: 1.0 L Smartstream G1.0 turbo GDi I3 (Mild hybrid); 1.2 L Smartstream G1.2 I4; 1.4 L Kappa II I4
- Transmission: 5/6-speed manual; 6-speed automated manual; 6-speed automatic; 7-speed DCT
- Hybrid drivetrain: Mild hybrid (1.0L I3)

Dimensions
- Wheelbase: 2,580 mm (101.6 in)
- Length: 4,180 mm (164.6 in)
- Width: 1,775 mm (69.9 in)
- Height: 1,490–1,500 mm (58.7–59.1 in)
- Curb weight: 1,045–1,255 kg (2,304–2,767 lb)

=== Overview ===
The Bayon was first revealed in March 2021. It shares its mechanical DNA with the third-generation i20

==== Exterior ====
The Bayon focuses on a rugged but high-tech profile featuring sharp body-side creases, a split-headlight setup, and distinctive arrow-shaped LED taillights connected by a thin horizontal light strip.

==== Interior ====
Inside, the Bayon borrows heavily from the i20, showcasing a dual 10.25-inch screen layout (one for the digital instrument cluster and one for the central infotainment). Comfort features include wireless smartphone charging, a BOSE premium sound system, and multi-color ambient lighting.

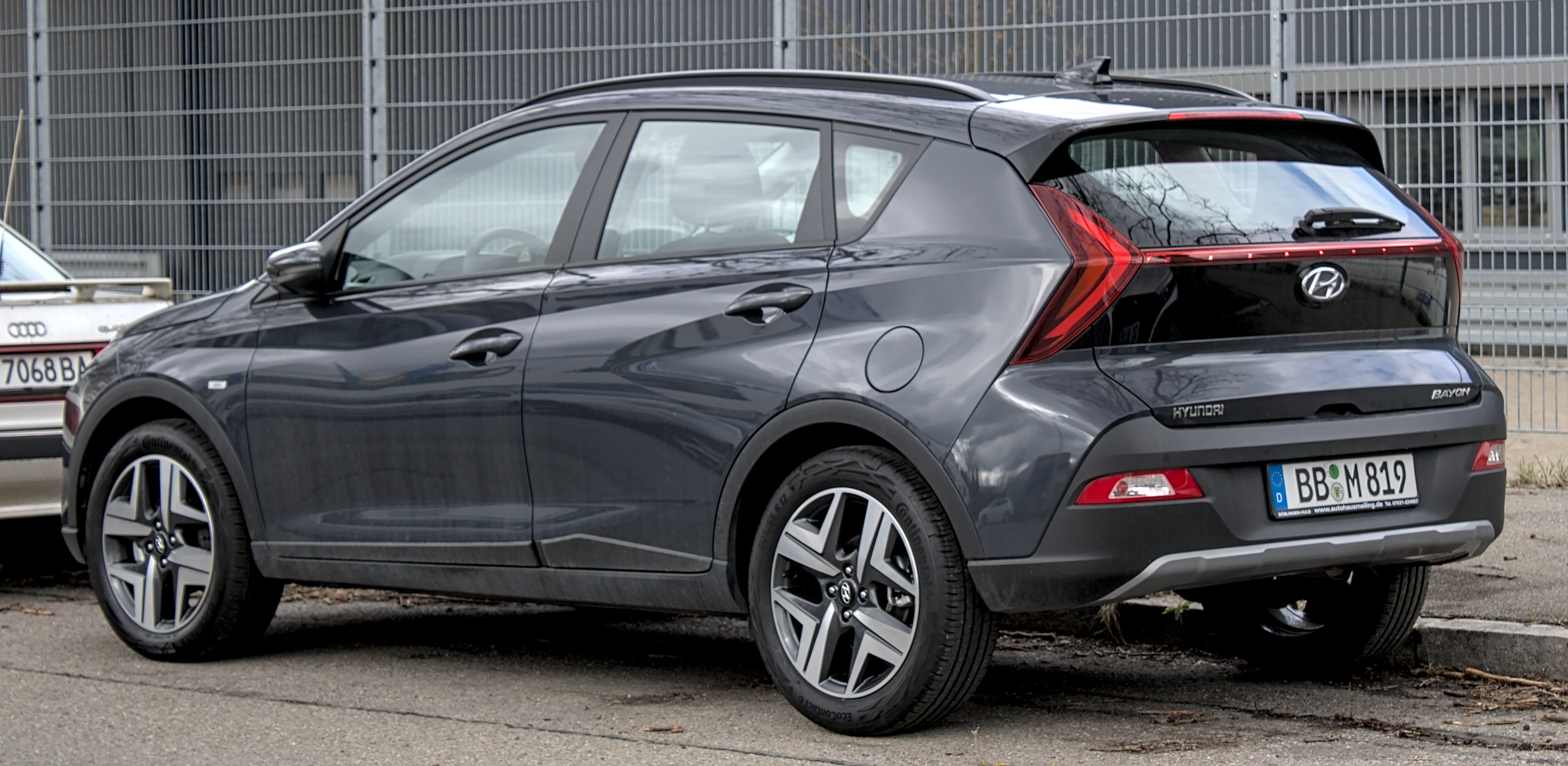
Rear view

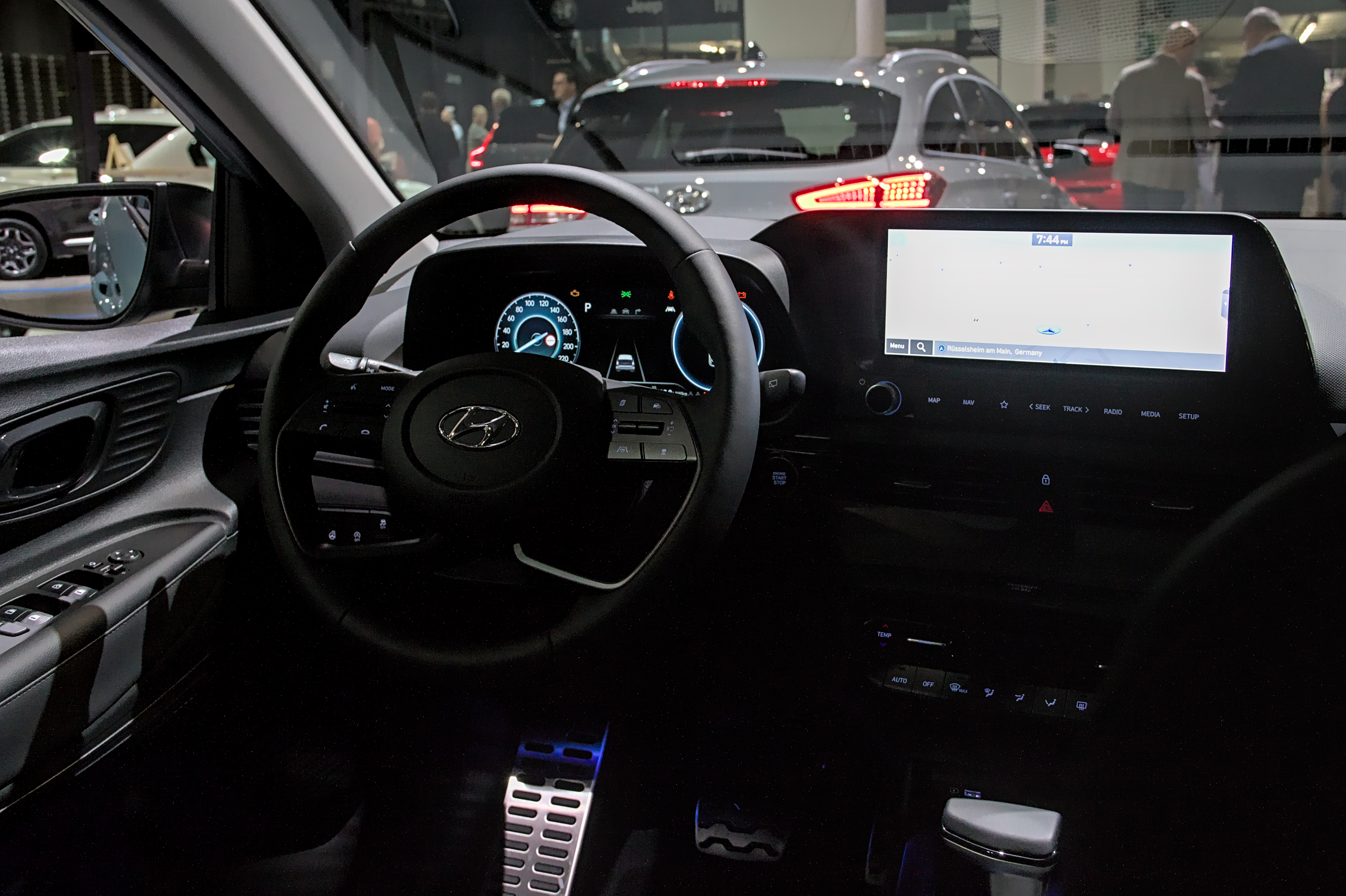
Interior (LHD)

=== Facelift (2024) ===
The Bayon facelift was revealed on 18 January 2024. Changes include a new front LED daytime running light that spans across the top front fascia, an updated front fascia, updated front and rear bumpers, new alloy wheel designs, and added interior and safety features.

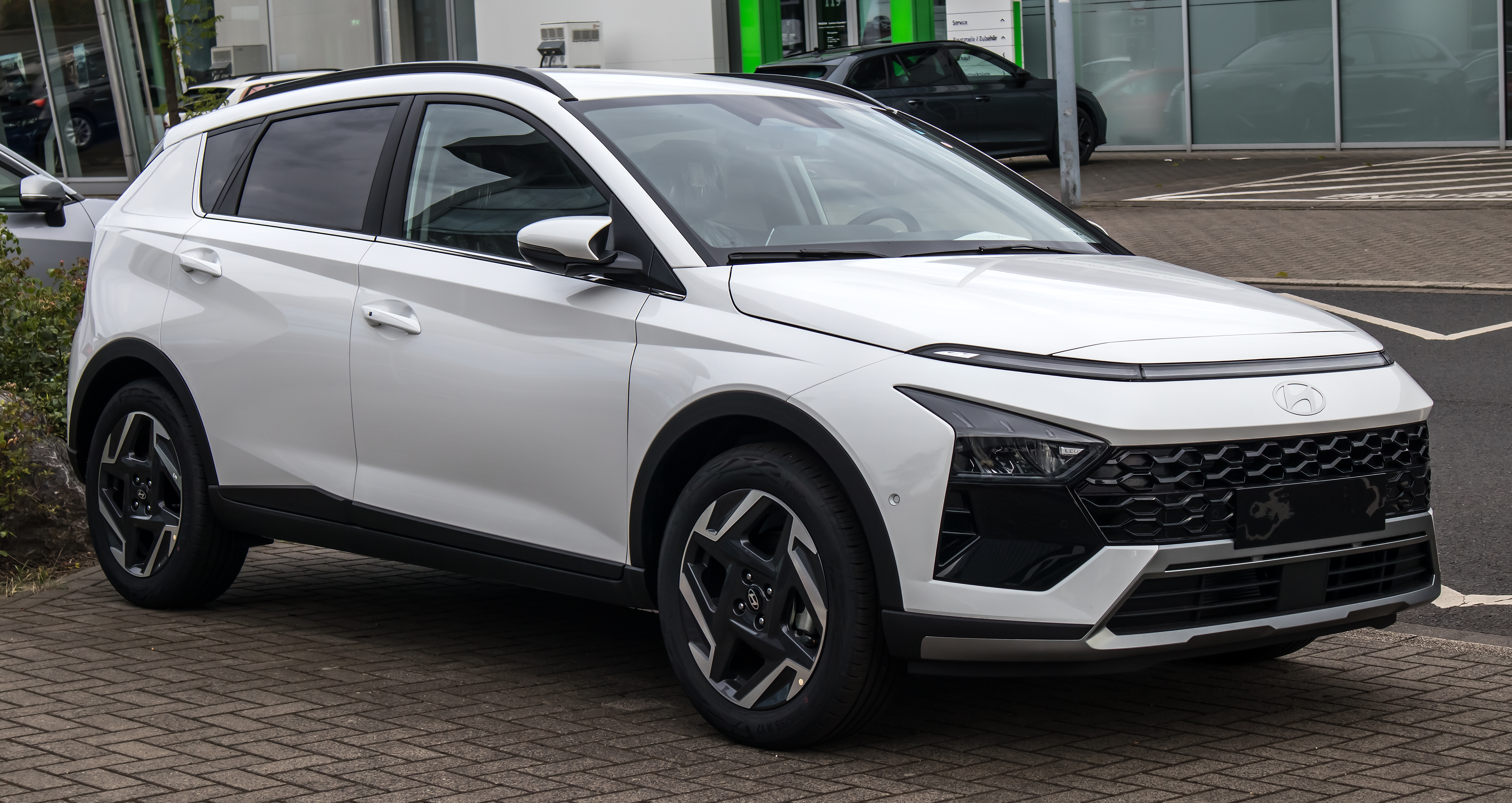
Facelift Bayon (front)

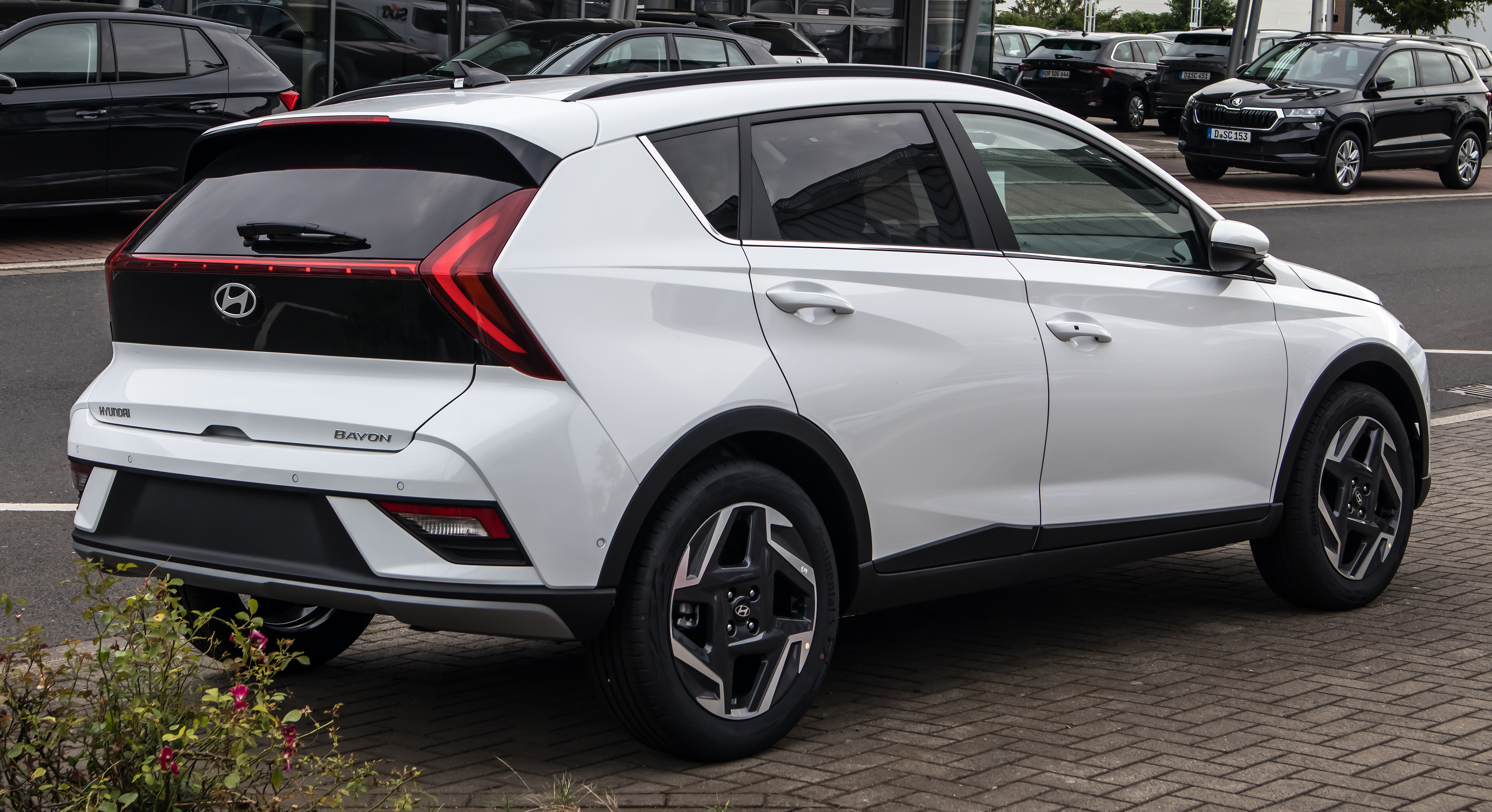
Facelift Bayon (rear)

=== Powertrain ===
Specs
Model	Year	Transmission	Power	Torque	0–100 km/h (0-62 mph) (official)	Top speed
Petrol
Smartstream G1.0 T-GDi	2021–present	6-speed manual 6-speed clutchless manual	100 PS (74 kW; 99 hp) @ 4,500–6,000 rpm	17.5 kg⋅m (172 N⋅m; 127 lbf⋅ft) @ 1,500–4,000 rpm	10.7s	183 km/h (114 mph)
Smartstream G1.0 T-GDi	2021–present	7-speed DCT	100 PS (74 kW; 99 hp) @ 4,500–6,000 rpm	17.5 kg⋅m (172 N⋅m; 127 lbf⋅ft) @ 1,500–4,000 rpm	11.7s	181 km/h (112 mph)
Smartstream G1.0 T-GDi	2021–present	6-speed manual 6-speed clutchless manual	120 PS (88 kW; 118 hp) @ 6,000 rpm	17.5 kg⋅m (172 N⋅m; 127 lbf⋅ft) @ 1,500–4,000 rpm	10.4s	185 km/h (115 mph)
Smartstream G1.0 T-GDi	2021–present	7-speed DCT	120 PS (88 kW; 118 hp) @ 6,000 rpm	20.4 kg⋅m (200 N⋅m; 148 lbf⋅ft) @ 2,000–3,500 rpm	10.4s	185 km/h (115 mph)
Smartstream G1.2 MPi	2021–present	5-speed manual	84 PS (62 kW; 83 hp) @ 6,000 rpm	12 kg⋅m (118 N⋅m; 87 lbf⋅ft) @ 4,200 rpm	13.5s	165 km/h (103 mph)
1.4 Kappa II MPi	2021–present	6-speed manual	100 PS (74 kW; 99 hp) @ 6,000 rpm	13.7 kg⋅m (134 N⋅m; 99 lbf⋅ft) @ 3,500 rpm	12.6s	176 km/h (109 mph)
1.4 Kappa II MPi	2021–present	6-speed automatic	100 PS (74 kW; 99 hp) @ 6,000 rpm	13.7 kg⋅m (134 N⋅m; 99 lbf⋅ft) @ 3,500 rpm	13.1s	176 km/h (109 mph)

=== Safety ===
Euro NCAP test results Hyundai Bayon 1.0 T-GDi GL (LHD) (2021)
Test	Points	%
Overall:	4 /5 stars	
Adult occupant:	29.2	76%
Child occupant:	40.4	82%
Pedestrian:	41.4	76%
Safety assist:	10.8	67%

== Second generation (BC4; 2026) ==
Second generation

Overview
- Model code: BC4 CUV
- Production: 2027 (to commence)
- Assembly: Turkey: İzmit (Hyundai Assan); India: Chennai (HMIL)

Body and chassis
- Related: Hyundai i20 (BC4)

Dimensions
- Wheelbase: 2,600 mm (102.4 in)
- Length: 4,245 mm (167.1 in)
- Width: 1,810 mm (71.3 in)

The second-generation Indian-spec Bayon was revealed on 12 October 2026 and will be launched on 26 October 2026. Hyundai Motor India described the car as an "Intelligent Utility Vehicle" and said it includes a generative-AI voice assistant; the model is positioned between the Venue and the Creta in the brand's India line-up.

The second-generation European-spec Bayon N Line was unveiled on 12 October 2026.

The Hyundai Bayon was launched in the Indian market on 26 October 2026 at a starting price of ₹10 lakh (ex-showroom), positioned below the Creta in Hyundai's mid-size SUV lineup.

2027 Bayon N Line (Europe)

== Sales ==
Year	Europe (Note: Europe: 2020 EU 27 + UK + Switzerland + Norway + Iceland)	Turkey
2021	15,404	5,067
2022	20,486	12,535
2023	27,793	17,348
2024	28,241	17,581

== See also ==
- List of Hyundai vehicles
