= ICIG =

ICIG may refer to:

- Inspector General of the Intelligence Community, an Inspector General office in the Office of Inspector General (United States) abbreviated IC IG
- International Consortium of Investigative Journalists, part of the Center for Public Integrity
- Institut du Cancer et d'Immunogénétique (ICIG) that presents the Georges Mathé Award
- Iran Compress Industrial Group
