= IKD =

IKD may refer to:

- International Communists of Germany (Internationalen Kommunisten Deutschlands)
- Iran Khodro Diesel
