= Hyundai F engine =

The Hyundai F engine also known by its engine code D4GA or D4GB is a diesel engine produced by Hyundai Motor Group for small and medium-sized commercial vehicles.

== Overview ==
It was unveiled in October 2007 at Hyundai Motor Company's Jeonju plant, along with the G engine and H engine. It delivers a maximum output of 170 hp and a maximum torque of 62.0 kg·m, and meets the Euro 6 standards.

Applications

- Hyundai Mighty (2008–present)
- Hyundai County (2008–present)
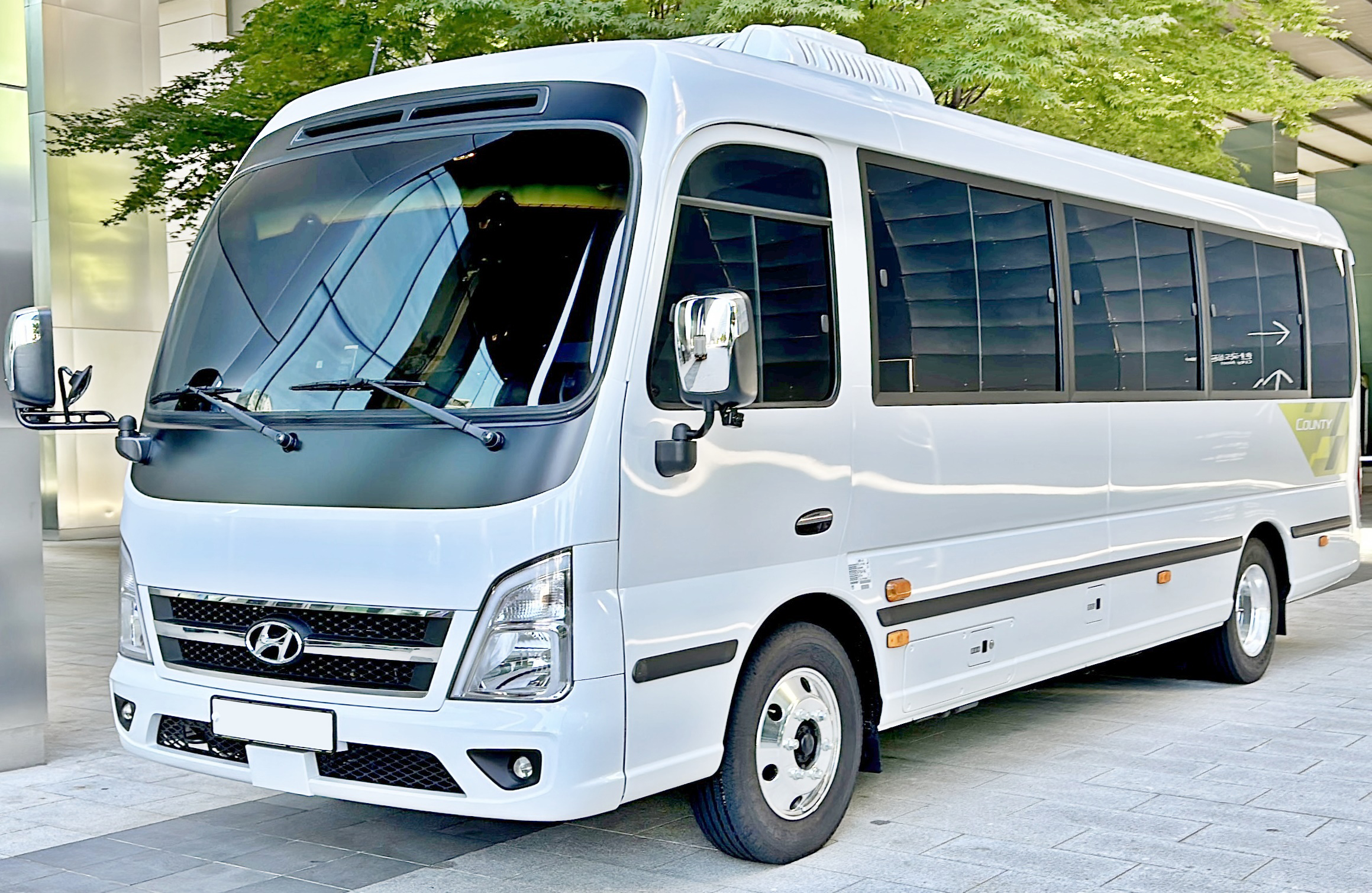
Hyundai County

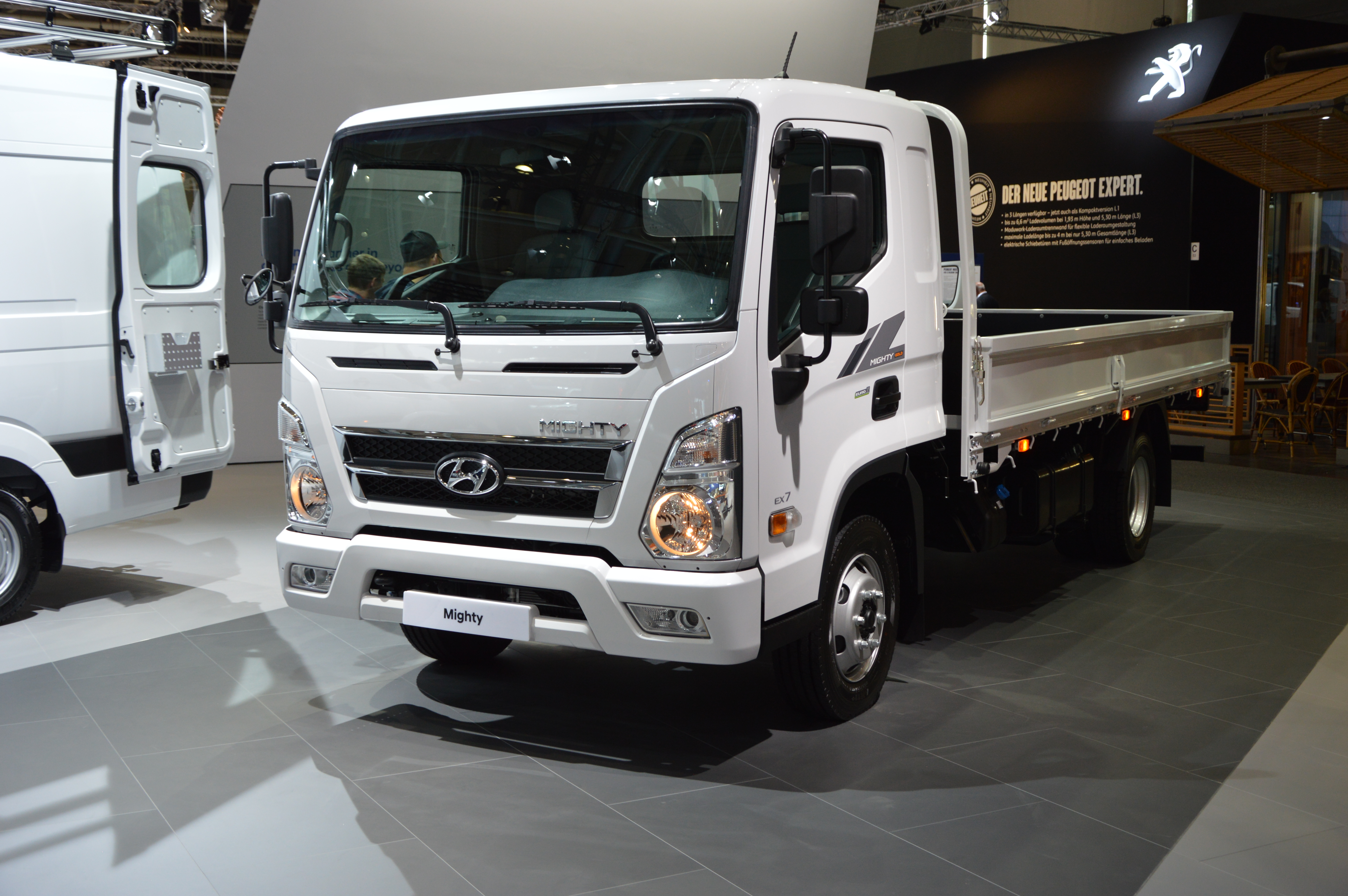
Hyundai Mighty
