= Sivan Design Group =

Iranian car design firm

Sivan Design Group گروه طراحان سیوان
- Company type: Private
- Genre: Automotive
- Founded: Tehran, Iran (2006)
- Founder: Alireza Mohammadzadeh Mohammad Hossein Amini Yekta
- Headquarters: Tehran, Iran
- Area served: Worldwide
- Key people: Alireza Mohammadzadeh (CEO); Mohammad Hossein Amini Yekta(chairman)
- Services: Automotive design
- Website: http://www.c1dg.com

Sivan Design Group, also known as C1 Design Group, is an Iranian car design firm and product development company in Tehran, Iran. Founded in 2006 by Alireza Mohammadzadeh & Mohammad Hossein Amini Yekta. SIVAN Group has grown from a two-person design and engineering company to a product development firm.

== Group Companies ==
- Sivan design co.
- Vira design co.
- Pishro fan Ajand co.

== Work ==
=== Production & prototype models ===
Sivan Design Group has been credited for the design of a variety of concepts as well as production cars since the firm's founding in 2006 such as:

Notable car designs

- Samand Facelift
- Samand Ambulance
- Saipa Diesel New Budsun NB8
- Mercedes-Benz O309 facelift (O511)
- Iran Khodro Diesel Bus O457 facelift (FLO 457)

=== Cooperation with universities ===
- Sharif University of Technology in designing Electric car in electric car competition 2008

== Design Contest & Automotive design exhibition ==
Sivan design group has been held design contest in automotive filed every 2 Year. First contest held from 24 April to 24 September 2009 and the first collective concept car design exhibition titled "From Dream to Reality" took place from 18 to 23 April 2009 at the Kamal Aldin Behzad Gallery in Teheran, Iran.

== Gallery ==
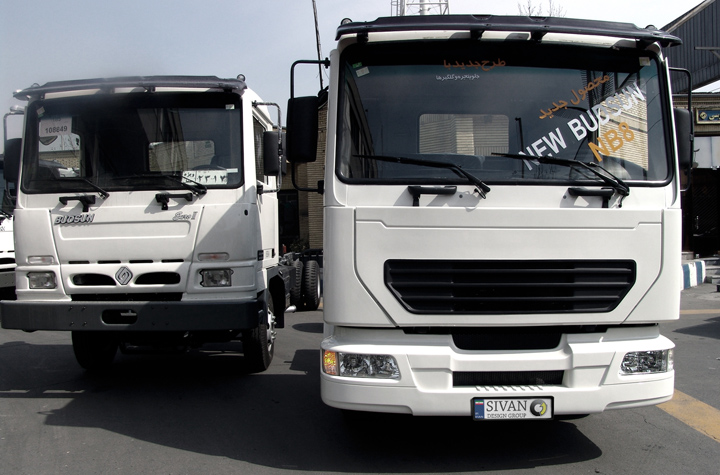
Saipa Diesel New Budsun NB8 (right) vs. Saipa Diesel Budsun (left)

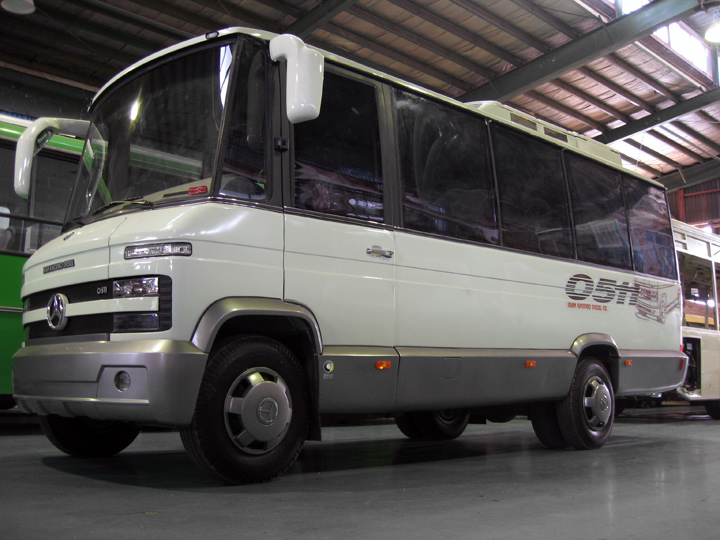
Iran khodro diesel Minibus O511

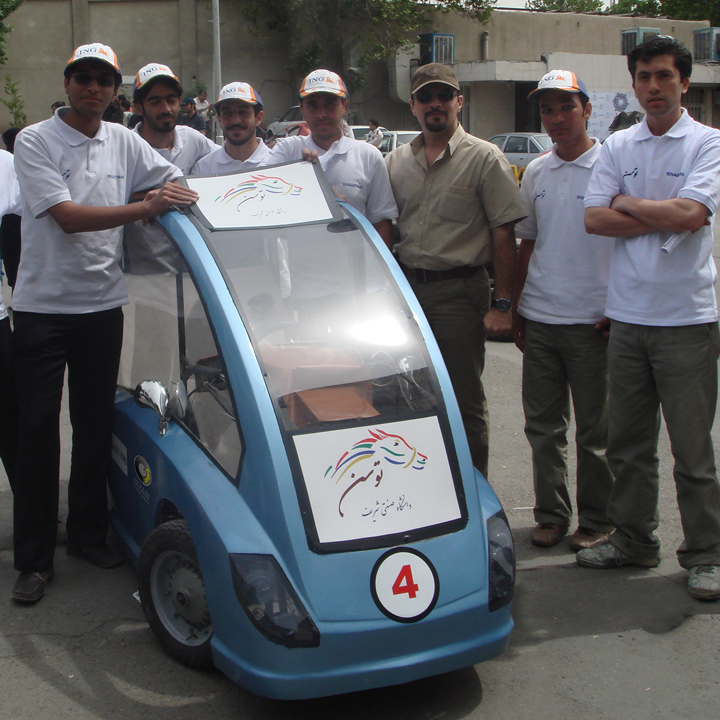
Sharif university Tosan team and A. Mohammadzadeh (CEO of Sivan)

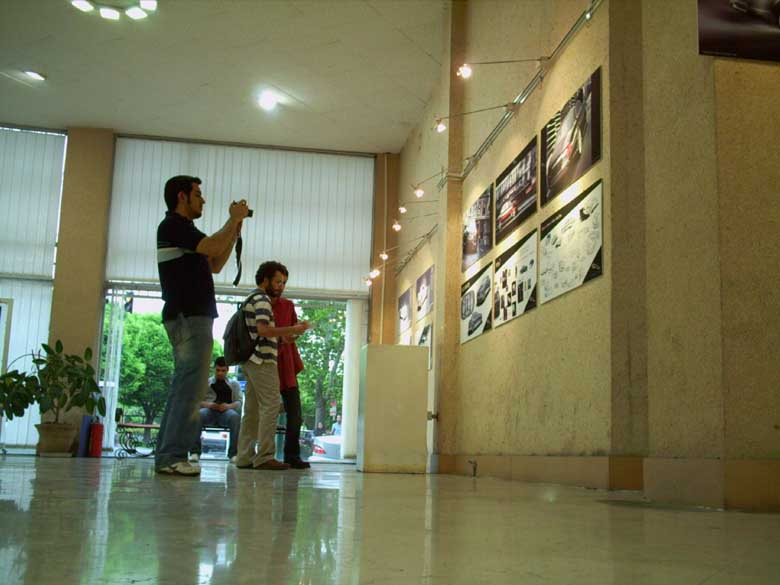
"From Dream to Reality" exhibition
