= Mercedes-Benz short-bonnet trucks =

Mercedes-Benz Kurzhauber
- Mercedes-Benz LAK 2624 (240 hp)

Overview
- Manufacturer: Daimler-Benz (1959–1995); Freightliner (1975–1991); Iran Khodro Diesel Company (1979–present)
- Production: 1959–present
- Assembly: West Germany: Mannheim (medium-weight trucks); West Germany: Gaggenau (heavy trucks); Brazil: São Bernardo do Campo; Iran: Tehran; South Africa: East London

Body and chassis
- Class: Truck
- Layout: FR layout

Chronology
- Successor: Freightliner FL-Series (in-direct)

The Mercedes-Benz "Kurzhauber" (short-bonnet) truck is a conventional layout, cab-after-engine truck manufactured from 1959 to present day. In Germany, it is most commonly referred to as the Kurzhauber (for "short bonnet").

To meet the stricter German regulations on overall length, the Seebohm laws, the cabine was pushed forward to partly cover the engine underneath the windshield, all in the name of making a shorter truck while keeping the flatbed length. The short-bonnet truck was built in many countries and remains in service throughout many of the regions to which it was exported.

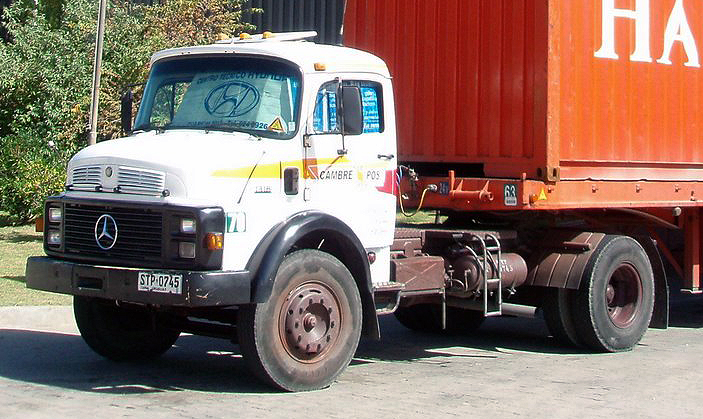
Brazilian-built Mercedes-Benz L1318 (Uruguay)

== History ==
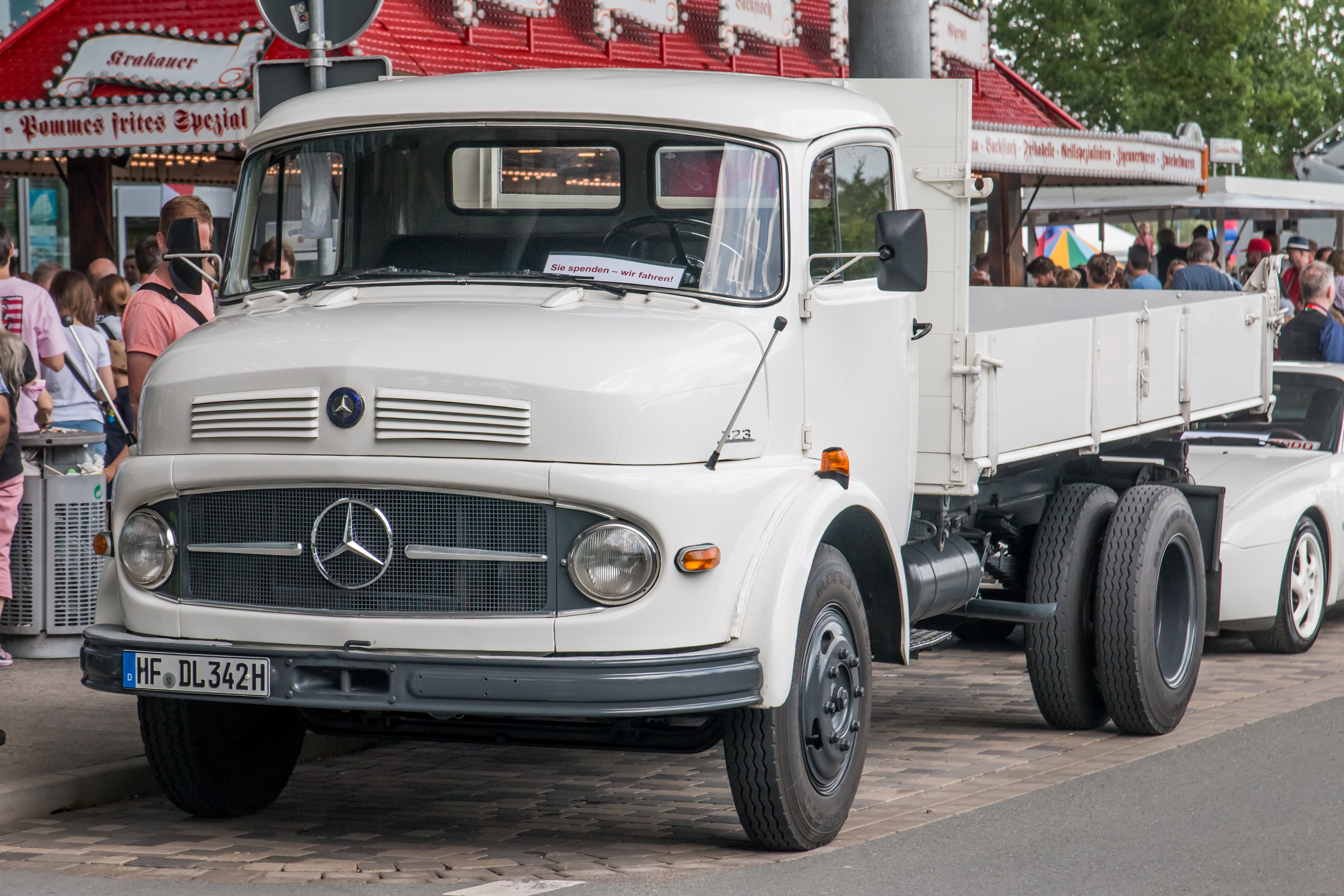
Mercedes-Benz LK 323

The first short-bonnet truck model, the Mercedes-Benz L 337, was first produced in Germany in 1959. Its technical successors were in production for export until 1995, long after domestic German sales had ended. The short-bonnet truck was a big export success for Mercedes-Benz and became very popular in the Middle East, Asia Pacific, South America, and Africa.

Originally, medium-weight trucks (L 323 and L 327, with 100 PS or 74 kW inline-six diesels) intended for shorter delivery and construction work were built in Daimler-Benz' Mannheim plant. The heavier trucks, for long-distance and heavy construction work, were built in the Gaggenau plant. These were designated L 337 and L 332 B (L 334 B from 1960), with 12 t (26,500 lb) or 19 t (41,900 lb) total weights and 172–180 PS (127–132 kW) diesel six-cylinders. In 1962 the more powerful 19-tonne L 334 C was added, mainly intended for export. The multiple model designations were letter combinations reflecting the vehicle's intended use, until a new system (still in use today) was introduced in the summer of 1963 to include overall weight and engine power.

The 5.7 L (5,675 cc) OM 352 was Mercedes-Benz' first direct-injection diesel engine. After having debuted in 1964, a 130 PS (96 kW) was installed in the Kurzhauber in the 1967 L/LP 1113 B series ("11" for the tonnage, "13" reflecting tens of horsepower). The engine (and other versions thereof) gradually spread through the range, replacing the earlier indirect-injection units.

Just as the Dodge Power Wagon became synonymous with oil exploration throughout Arabia in the 1950s, the short-bonnet trucks, together with the Kenworth 953, became synonymous with the Arabian exploration boom throughout the 1960s. Many roads throughout Arabia were not surfaced until the early 1980s and there were no weight or length limitations on road haulage. This meant that the trucks carried heavier loads than those for which they were designed - in some instances three times the maximum designated loaded weight. In carrying these loads, the short-bonnet trucks gained a reputation for toughness and reliability. Nearly all short-bonnet trucks shipped to Arabia were orange in colour, while all short-bonnet trucks shipped to North Africa were green in colour.

Kurzhauber of Brazilian origins were also assembled and sold in North America until 1991, when they were replaced by the new Class 6 and Class 7 trucks from Freightliner (FL60/FL70). This was the last Mercedes-Benz truck to be sold in North America until the Sprinter in 2001, although the Mercedes-Benz badge persisted on Freightliner engines of Mercedes-Benz origin.

== Continuation ==
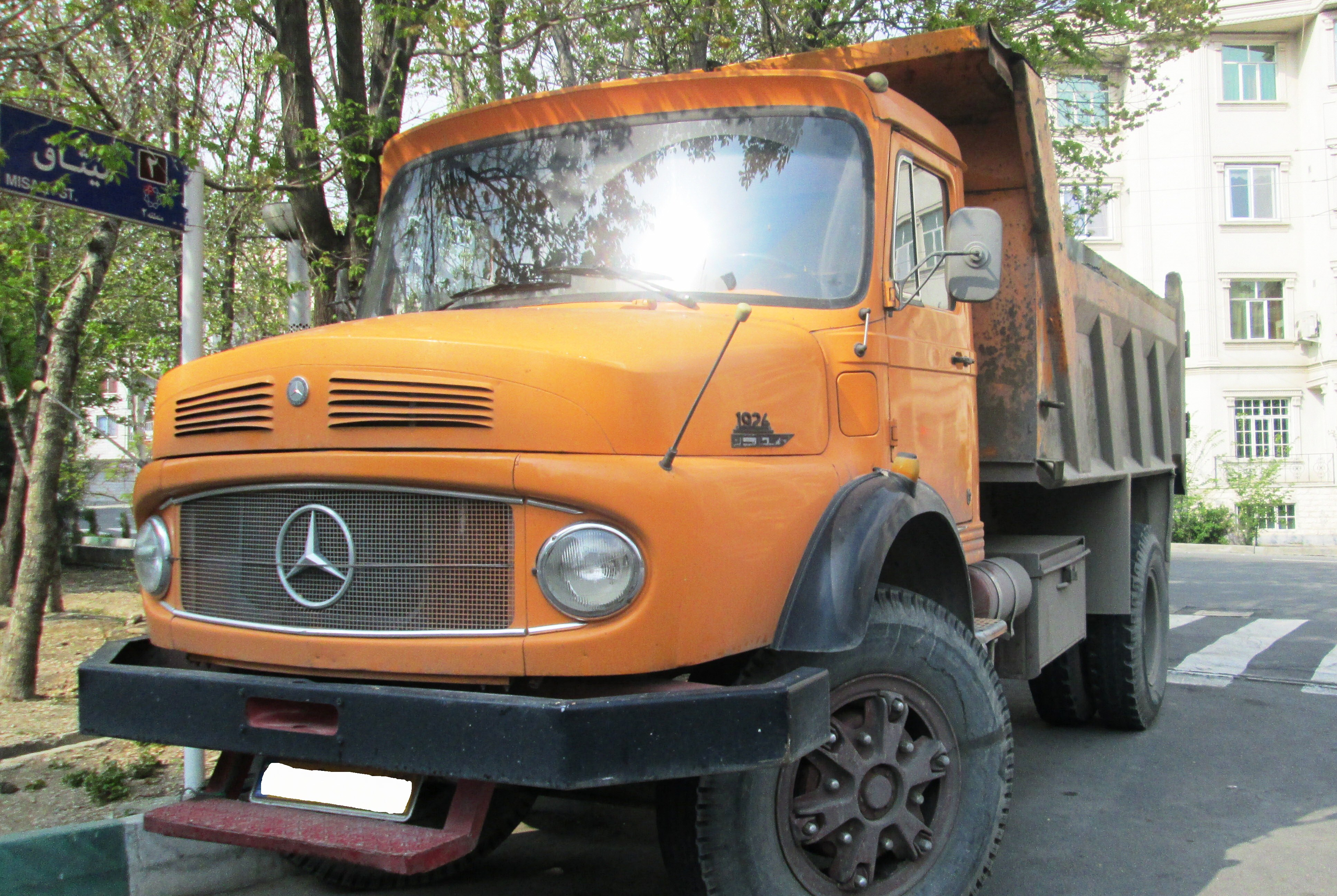
LK 1924 Model, made by Iran Khodro Diesel

After 1995, production in South Africa ceased but was continued at Mercedes-Benz factories in South America, where the Kurzhauber had already been built for decades. The trucks built in Brazil received a facelift in 1982, with a squared-off grille in black plastic featuring rectangular headlights for a more modern (albeit somewhat incongruous) look. Brazilian-built Mercedes-Benz short-bonnet trucks were assembled CKD (completely knocked down) by Freightliner until the end of 1990, the result of Daimler-Benz' 1981 purchase of the Oregon-based manufacturer. The Brazilian Kurzhauber were sold as Class 6/7 trucks in the United States until 1991, when a Freightliner-badged replacement took over. Mercedes-Benz never made any substantial inroads into the US market, with a 1.5 percent market penetration in the segment in 1989 (2,037 trucks sold).

In Argentina, the short-bonnet trucks were made until 1997, when manufacture ceased in favour of the Sprinter and bus chassis only. The models made in the Virrey del Pino plant were: L 311, L 312, L/LS 1112, LA 1112, L 914, LA/LAS 1114, L/LK/LS 1114, L/LK 1215, L/LK 1218, L/LK 1514, L/LS/LK 1517, L/LS 1521, LA 1419, L/LS/LK 1518, L/LS 1526, L/LK 1615, L 1619, L 1620, L/LS 1622, L/LS 1633. In this country, the most popular line model was the Mercedes-Benz 1114, referred to in Spanish as the "once-catorce" ("eleven-fourteen"), while since 2016 the Atron 1735 has been the only short-bonnet model made in Argentina.

In Iran the Kurzhauber is still produced by Iran Khodro Diesel Company (formerly known as Khavar). This series was offered in five models: the 2628, 2624, 1921, 1924 and 911. The old 2628 model which is turbo-charged and has a suspension developed by Meiller-Kipper is known as Meiller Benz (بنز مایلر), while 2624 is known as "Zir Meiller" (meaning under meiller, since it has a similar suspension as 2628 "under" itself, but the "over" which is the engine and transmission are different). 1924 and 2624 models are still in production with OM-355 LA engine, ZF gearbox, A/C, power steering, parking heater, and ABS brakes. 2628 and 911 models are discontinued.
