= Hyundai County =

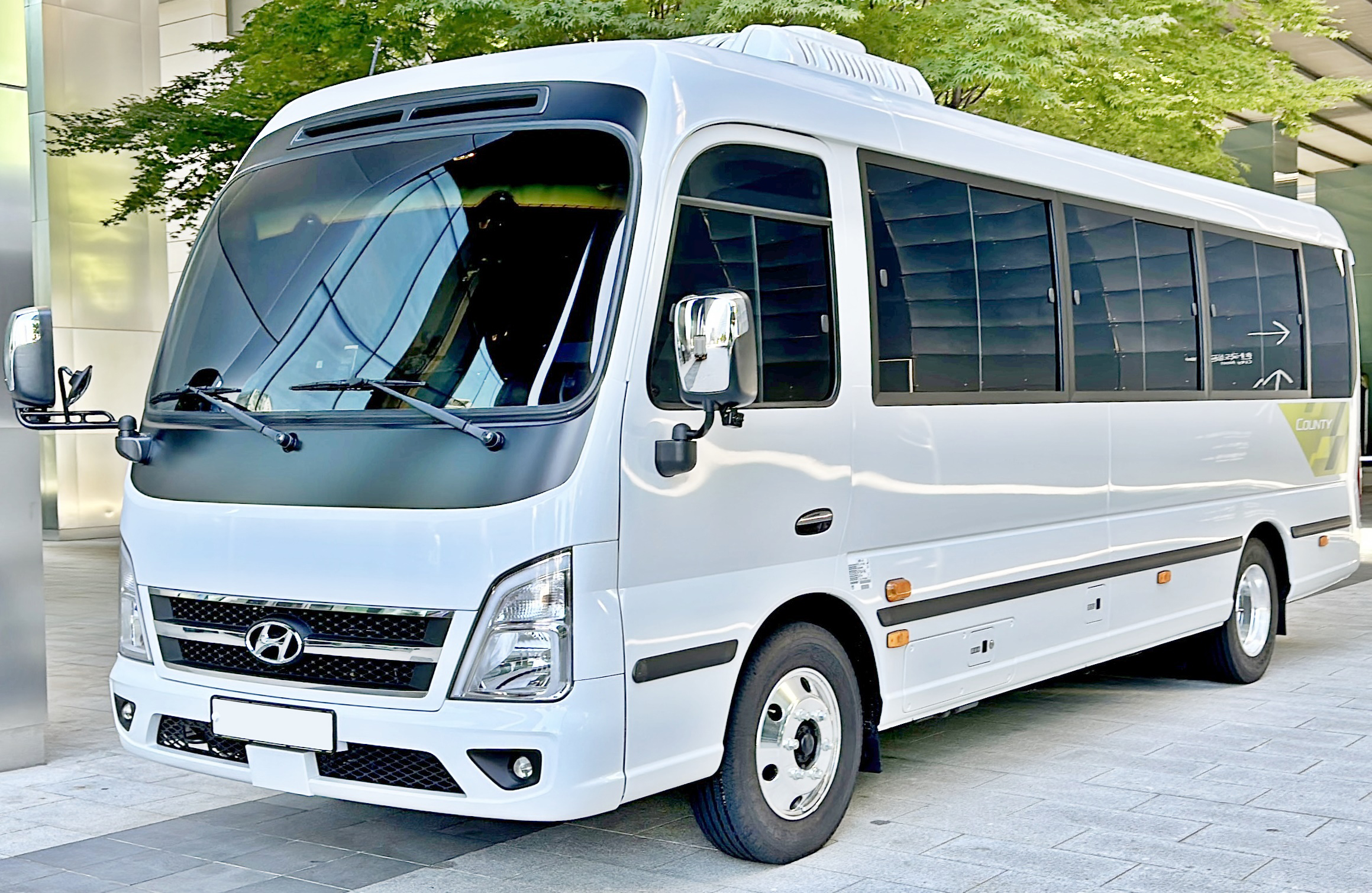

Overview
- Manufacturer: Hyundai Motor Company
- Also called: Haw Tai County (China); Hyundai County New Breeze
- Production: 1998–present
- Assembly: Vietnam: Ninh Bình (Hyundai Thanh Cong Vietnam (HTCV), Tracomeco and Thaco; Thailand: Bangkok (Yontarakit Industry)
- Designer: Hyundai Motor Company Design Center

Body and chassis
- Class: Minibus
- Body style: Single-decker bus (short & long body)
- Layout: Front-engine, rear-wheel-drive
- Doors: 1 (passenger bus); 2 (city bus)
- Floor type: Step-entrance
- Related: Hyundai Chorus; Kia Combi

Powertrain
- Engine: Hyundai D4-series Diesel I4: 3.3L D4AL Turbodiesel; 3.6L D4AF General; 3.9L D4DC Euro 1; 3.9L D4DB/DD/GA14/GA15/GA17 Turbodiesel; Hyundai F engine
- Transmission: 5-speed manual 6-speed automatic (Allison)

Dimensions
- Wheelbase: 3,350 mm (132 in) (standard body); 4,085 mm (160.8 in) (long body, extra long body)
- Length: Standard body: 6,350 mm (250 in) (1998-2019); 6,375 mm (251.0 in) (2020-present) Long body: 7,085 mm (278.9 in) (1998-2019); 7,110 mm (280 in) (2020-present) Extra long body: 7,710 mm (304 in) (2020-present)
- Width: 2,035 mm (80.1 in)
- Height: 2,755 mm (108.5 in)

Chronology
- Predecessor: Hyundai Chorus

The Hyundai County (hangul: 현대 카운티) is a single-decker minibus manufactured by the truck & bus division of Hyundai. It was introduced in 1998 as a successor to the Chorus. It is primarily available as city buses and tourist buses.

It is related to the now-discontinued Kia Combi.

== History ==
Hyundai County & e-County are designed by Hyundai Motor Company Jeonju Design Center. The County was built between 1998 and 2004, a new variant e-County was built since 2004. First facelift held in 2008. Minor change model was revealed in 2012 Busan Motor show.

EV spec called 'County Electric' was revealed in 2019 Hyundai Truck & Bus Business Fair with Hyundai Pavise. And facelifted version launched in May 2020 as 'County New Breeze'. Its design was based on a Chinese specification which was revealed in 2015 Auto Shanghai.

== First generation (CS/CN; 1998) ==
The first generation was released in 1998 as a successor to the Chorus and was produced until 2004. The e-County (e-카운티) was produced from 2004 to 2007 with a slightly modified County appearance. It was designed to meet Euro 3 standards and had some modified window arrangements.

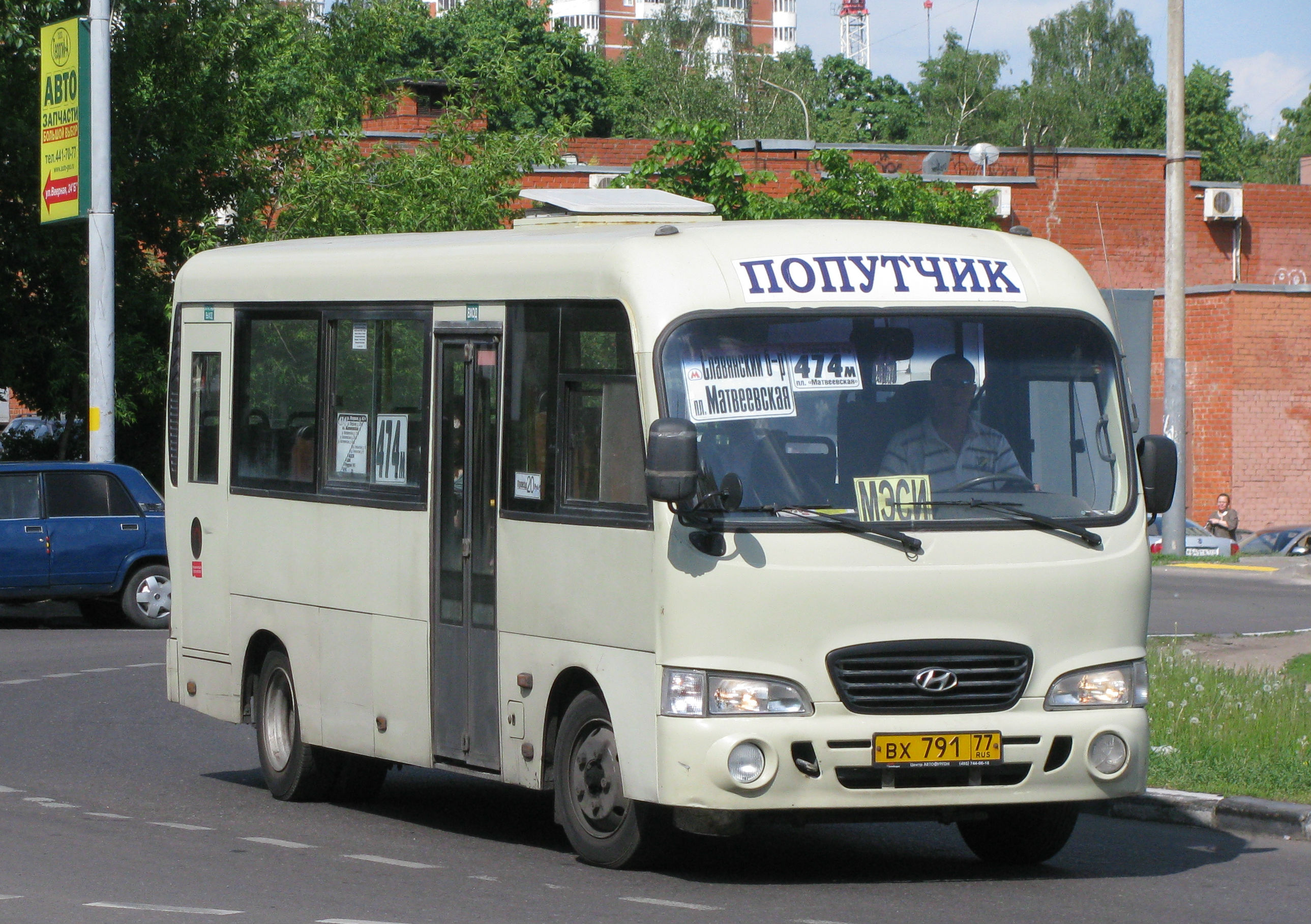
SWB built in Moscow, Russia

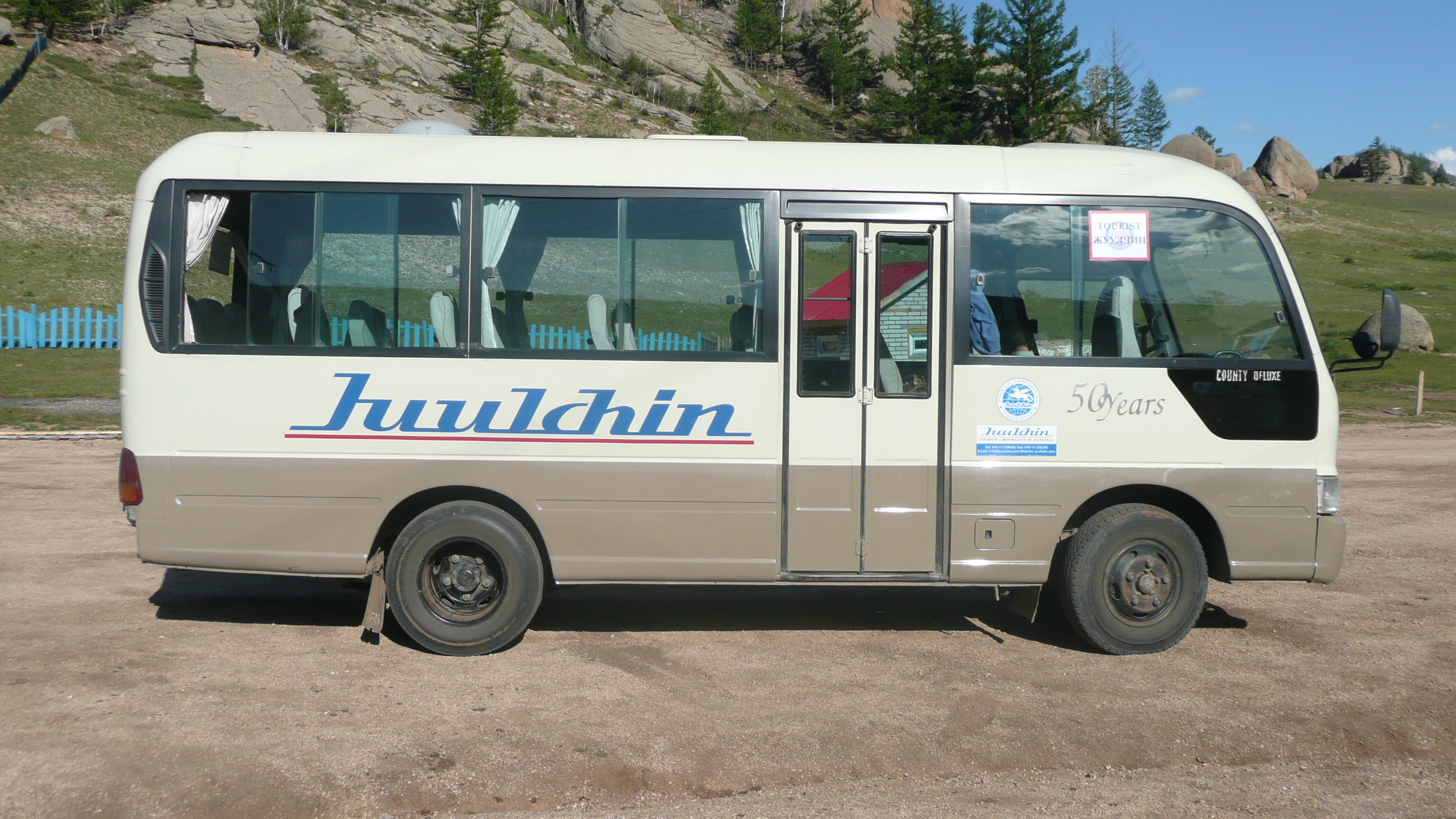
Side view

=== 2008 facelift ===
A facelift model of the e-County was released in 2008. It was equipped with Hyundai's 3.9-liter F engine and the front lamps and grille were changed. The New County (뉴 카운티) is the upgrade version of the e-County facelift model, produced from 2012 to 2020. It was upgraded from the existing F160 engine to the F170 engine. Several elements, including the transmission, handle color, wheels, and interior, were changed.

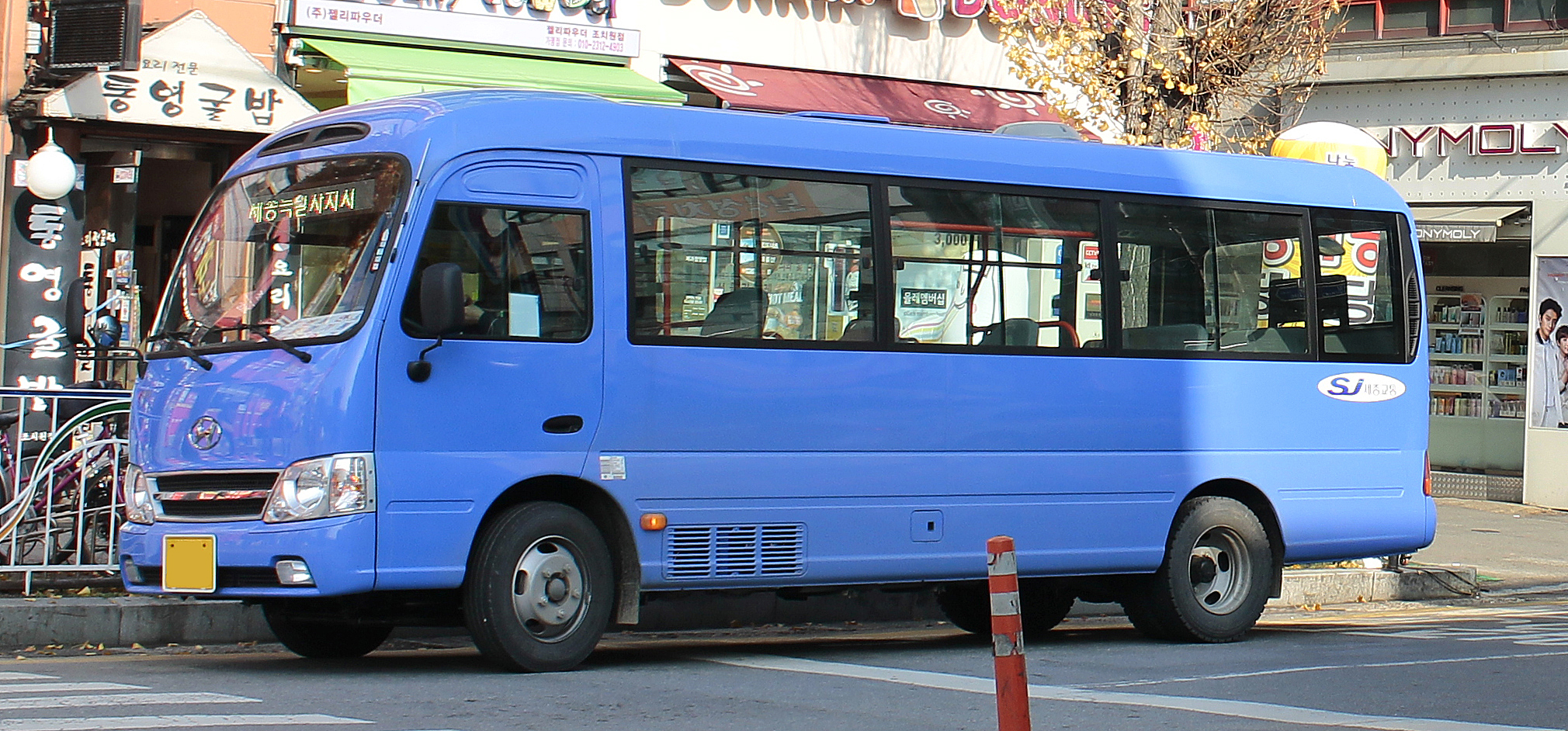
City bus in South Korea

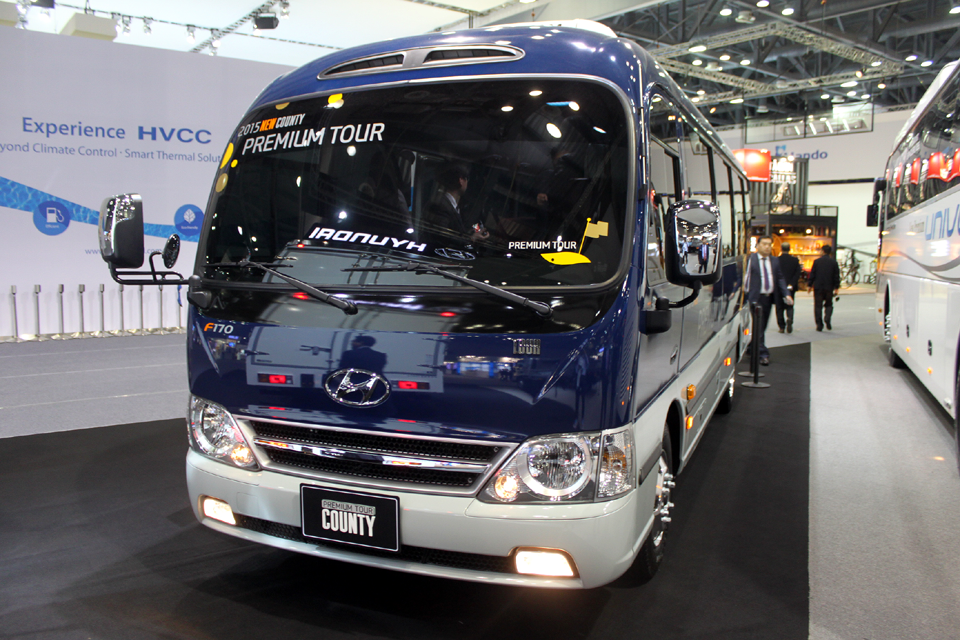
2012 upgrade

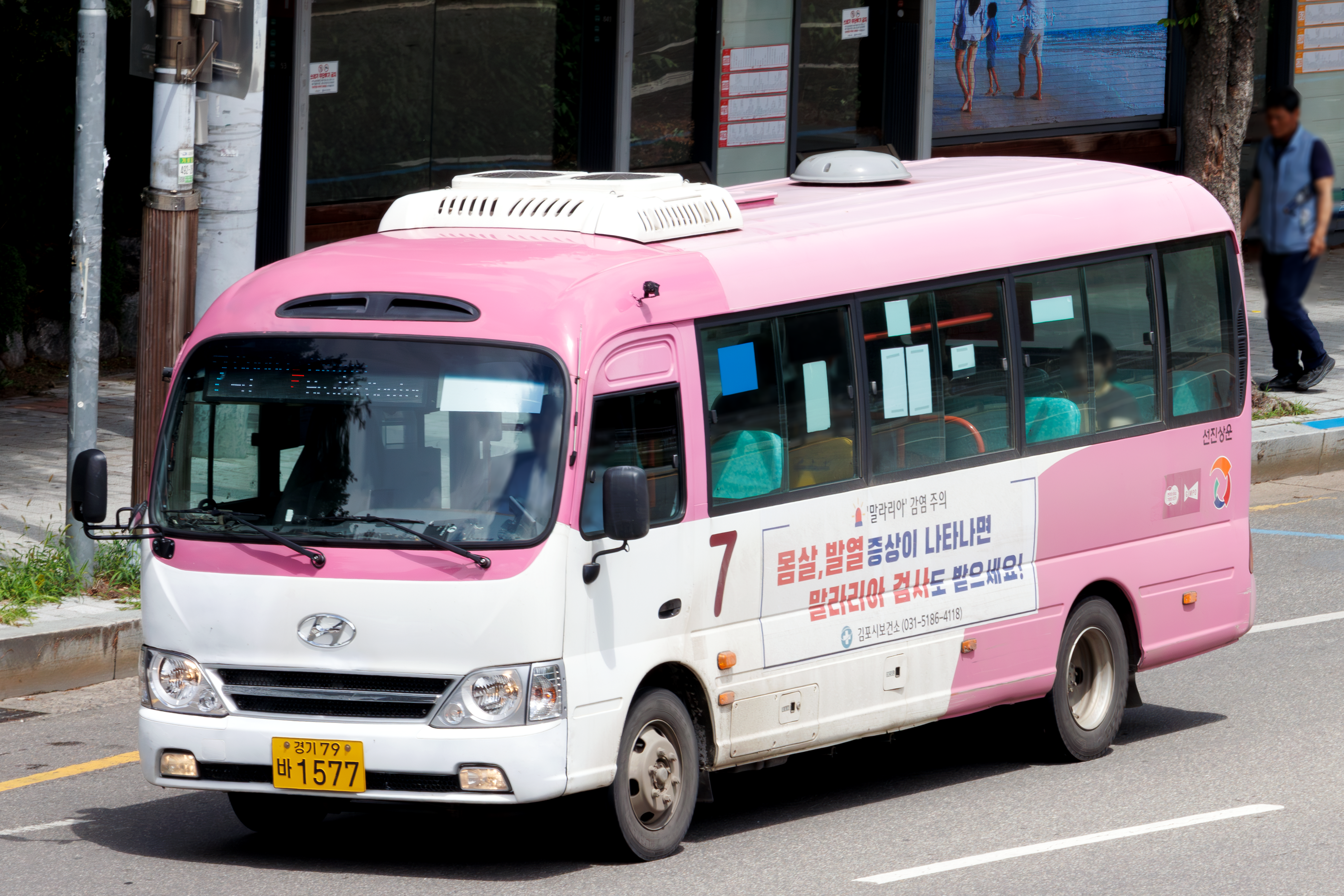
New County in Gimpo

=== 2020 facelift ===
A second facelift model County New Breeze was released in 2020.

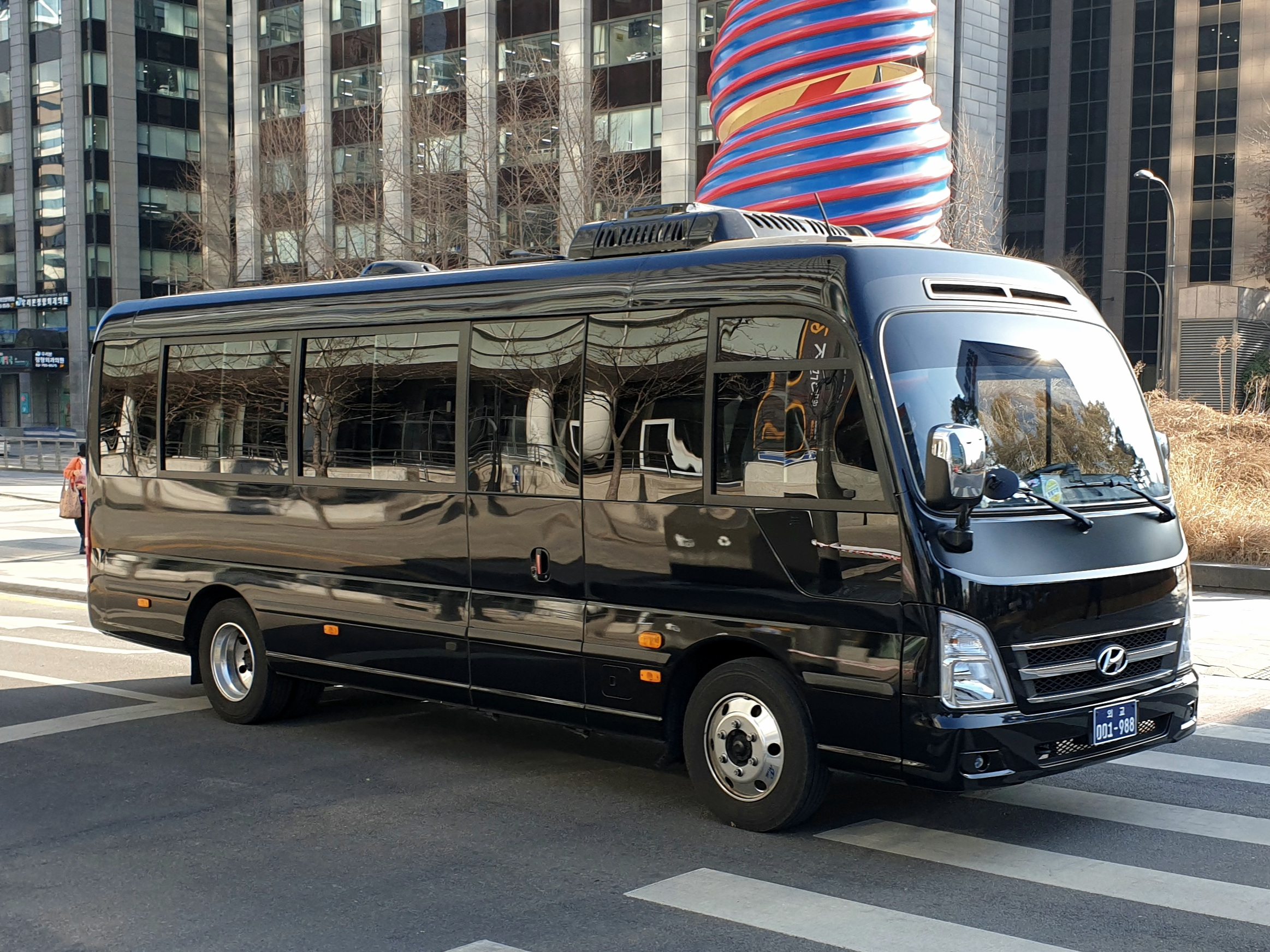
County New Breeze

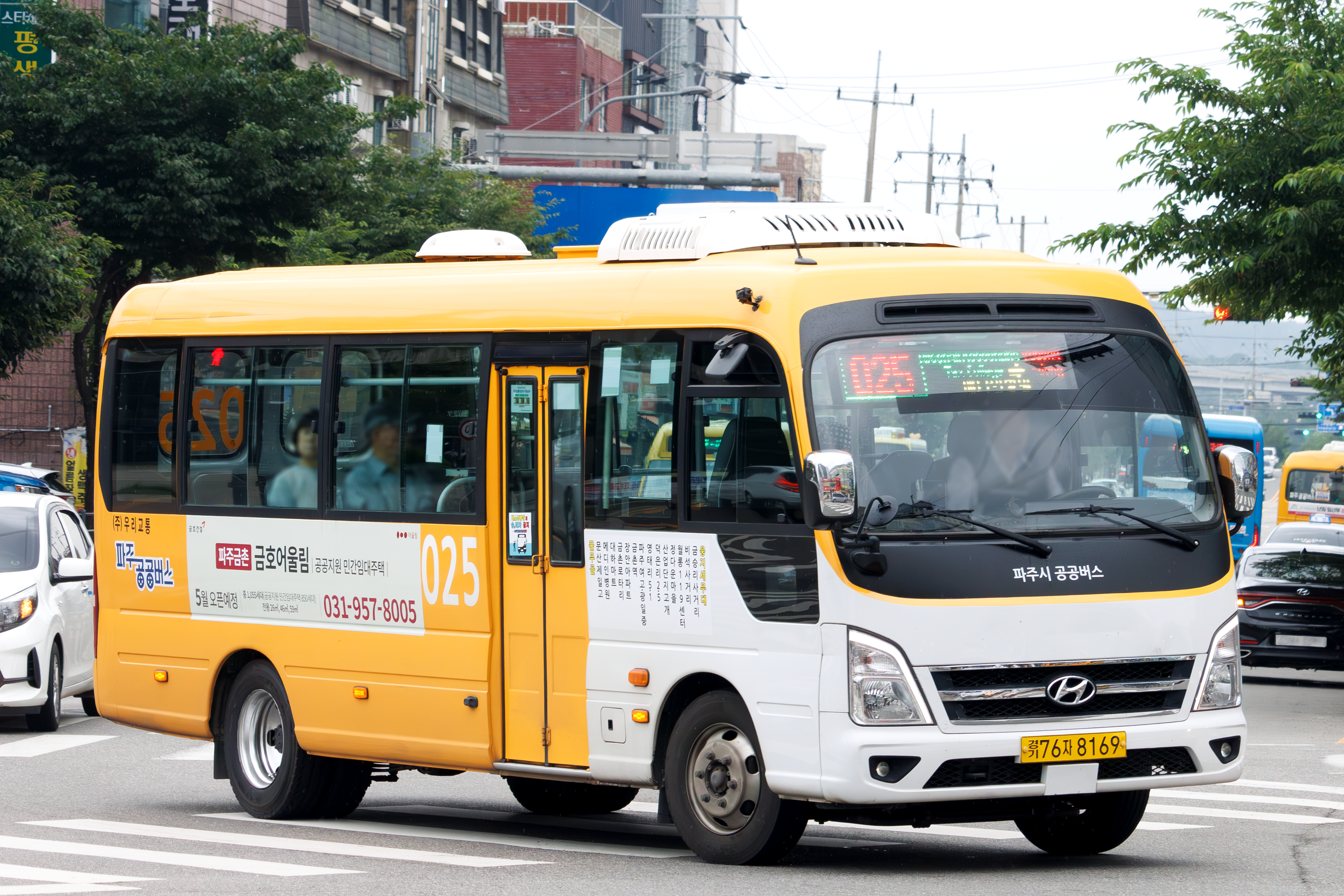
City bus in Paju, Gyeonggi Province

=== County Electric ===
The County Electric was released in 2020. It is equipped with features such as vehicle attitude control, 4-wheel disc brakes, and a rear emergency door. A 7-inch LCD cluster and button-type gear lever are applied.

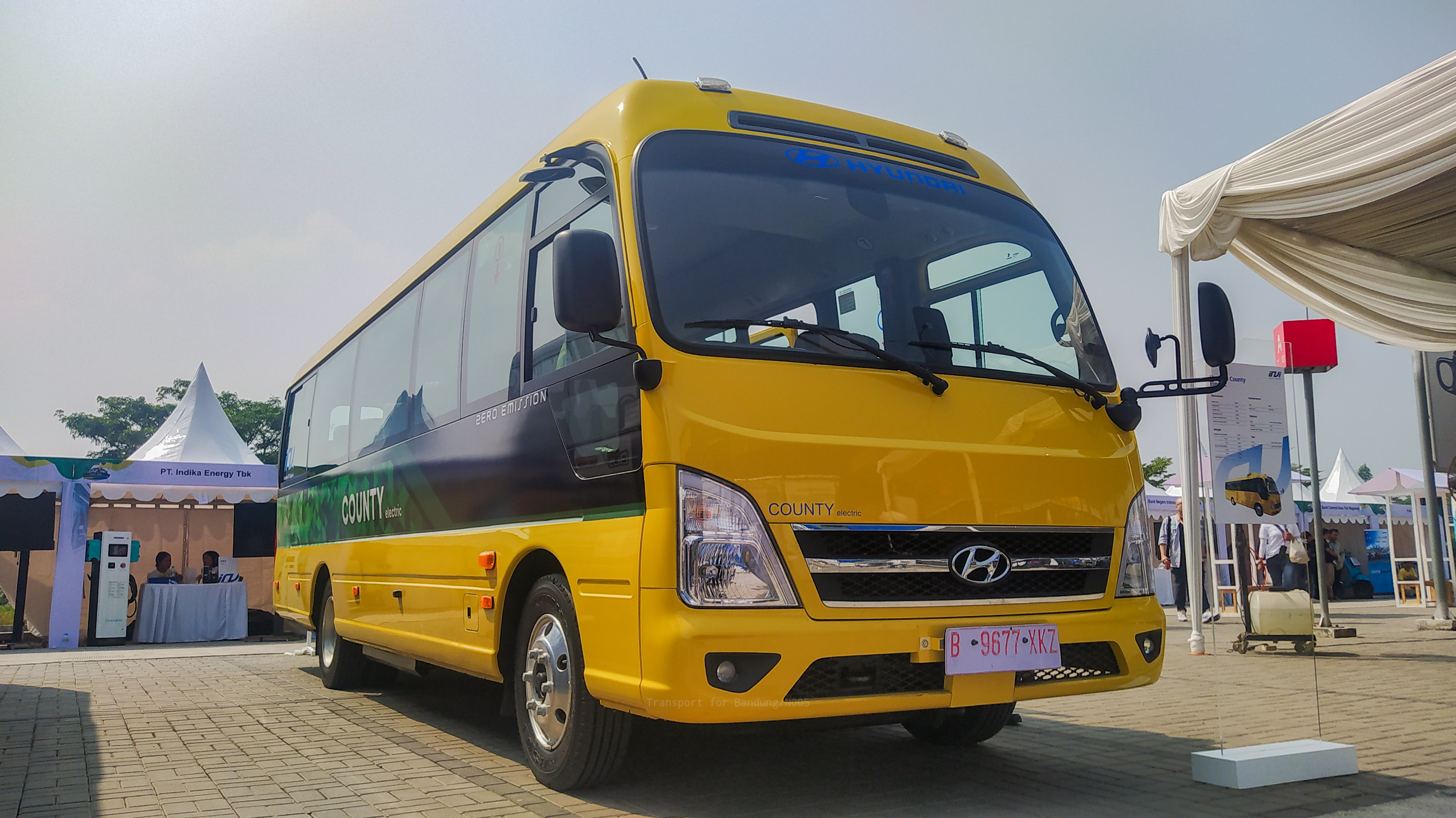
County Electric

== Model name (South Korea) ==
- Gold
- Tour (Rent A Car Bus)
- Super
- Deluxe
- Standard

== Lineup & body types ==
- County standard body: 15-25 passengers
- County long body: 20-30 passengers
- County extra long body: 26-34 passengers

== Engine ==
Model	Emissions	Aspiration	Displacement (Bore × Stroke)	Power	Torque	Top speed
D4AL	Euro I	Turbo charger intercooler	3,298 cm^{3} (201.3 cu in); 100 mm × 105 mm (3.9 in × 4.1 in)	115 PS (85 kW) @3,400 RPM	29 kg⋅m (284 N⋅m; 210 lbf⋅ft) @2,000 RPM	
D4AF	General	Natural	3,568 cm^{3} (217.7 cu in); 104 mm × 105 mm (4.1 in × 4.1 in)	100 PS (74 kW) @3,400 RPM	24 kg⋅m (235 N⋅m; 174 lbf⋅ft) @2,000 RPM	109 km/h
D4DC	Euro I	Natural	3,907 cm^{3} (238.4 cu in); 104 mm × 115 mm (4.1 in × 4.5 in)	105 PS (77 kW) @3,200 RPM	27 kg⋅m (265 N⋅m; 195 lbf⋅ft) @2,000 RPM	104 km/h
D4DB-d	Euro II	Turbo charger intercooler	3,907 cm^{3} (238.4 cu in); 104 mm × 115 mm (4.1 in × 4.5 in)	115 PS (85 kW) @2,900 RPM	30 kg⋅m (294 N⋅m; 217 lbf⋅ft) @2,000 RPM	120 km/h
D4DB	Euro II	Turbo charger intercooler	3,907 cm^{3} (238.4 cu in); 104 mm × 115 mm (4.1 in × 4.5 in)	130 PS (96 kW) @2,900 RPM	38 kg⋅m (373 N⋅m; 275 lbf⋅ft) @1,600 RPM	110 km/h
D4DD	Euro III	Turbo charger intercooler	3,907 cm^{3} (238.4 cu in); 104 mm × 115 mm (4.1 in × 4.5 in)	140 PS (103 kW) @2,800 RPM	38 kg⋅m (373 N⋅m; 275 lbf⋅ft) @1,600 RPM	115 km/h
D4GA14	Euro IV	Turbo charger intercooler	3,933 cm^{3} (240.0 cu in); 103 mm × 118 mm (4.1 in × 4.6 in)	140 PS (103 kW) @2,700 RPM	40 kg⋅m (392 N⋅m; 289 lbf⋅ft) @1,400 RPM	113 km/h
D4GA15	Euro IV	Turbo charger intercooler	3,933 cm^{3} (240.0 cu in); 103 mm × 118 mm (4.1 in × 4.6 in)	150 PS (110 kW) @2,500 RPM	59 kg⋅m (579 N⋅m; 427 lbf⋅ft) @1,400 RPM	140 km/h
D4GA17	Euro V	Turbo charger intercooler	3,933 cm^{3} (240.0 cu in); 103 mm × 118 mm (4.1 in × 4.6 in)	170 PS (125 kW) @2,500 RPM	62 kg⋅m (608 N⋅m; 448 lbf⋅ft) @1,400 RPM	133 km/h

== See also ==
- Hyundai Motor Company
- Hyundai Chorus
- List of buses
