= Iran Compress Industrial Group =

Iran Compress Co. (S.K.A.R)
- Type: Private
- Industry: Manufacturing
- Founded: Tehran 1965
- Founder: Hassan Assadi
- Headquarters: Tehran, Iran
- Key people: Hassan Assadi (CEO)
- Products: Dump trucks Heavy equipments Hydraulic machinery
- Website: www.iran-compress.com

Iran Compress (ﺍﻳـﺮﺍﻥ ﻛﻤﭙـﺮﺱ) (or Iran Compress Co. (S.K.A.R) ) is a manufacturer of industrial heavy equipment in Iran, partnering with companies, such as Iran Khodro Industrial Group and Saipa Group, two industrial manufacturers in Middle-East. Compressi means "truck tipper" in Persian. The company manufactures truck tippers and other industrial machinery components.

== History ==
Iran Compress was founded in 1962 to manufacture different types of dumper and relevant equipment.

== Operations ==
In 2005, Iran Compress Industrial Group started a major restructuring. This restructuring process resulted in establishment of the following two divisions within Iran Compress Industrial Group:

- An import/export division which mainly focuses on importing and distributing steel.

- Production and manufacturing of industrial heavy equipments.

== Products ==
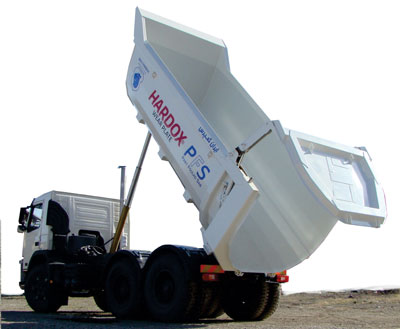
Hardox Tipper Equipment

=== Dump Trucks ===
- Heavy Tipper Equipment; Loading capacity: 16m³, Unloading capacity: up to 35MT, Can be installed on chassis of 6x4 trucks.
- Tipper Equipment with Horizontal Walls; For 8 x 4 trucks Loading capacity: 19 - 22m³, Unloading capacity: up to 45MT.
- Classic Tipper Equipment; For 4x2 trucks, Loading capacity: 10m³, Unloading capacity: up to 25MT
- Light Tipper Equipment; For 4x2 trucks, Loading capacity: 3-5m³, Unloading capacity: up to 10MT
- Dump Truck Equipment; For 4x6 trucks, Loading capacity: 13-15m³, Unloading capacity: up to 35MT
- HARDOX tipper equipment; Tipper equipment, made of HARDOX 450, with hydraulic back door, in assistance with Foulad Sab Karan, Iran and WEBER, Germany.
- 3-Way tipper equipment ; Ability to unload the cargo from 3 ways and changing to a small flat truck.

=== Hook Loader Equipment ===
- Sliding and Articulated Hookloader; For 4x2 trucks, Capacity: Up to 8MT, Length of mounting platform: 3500mm, Loading angle: 27˚, Unloading angle: 48˚, Capacity: 5MT, Hydraulic pressure: up to 250 bar.

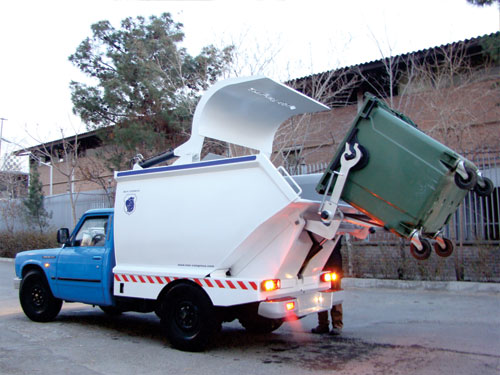
Mini Pack Garbage Carrier

=== Garbage Transportation Equipment ===
- Mini Pack Garbage Carrier;
- Large Garbage Transportation Equipment;

=== Truck-Mounted Cranes ===
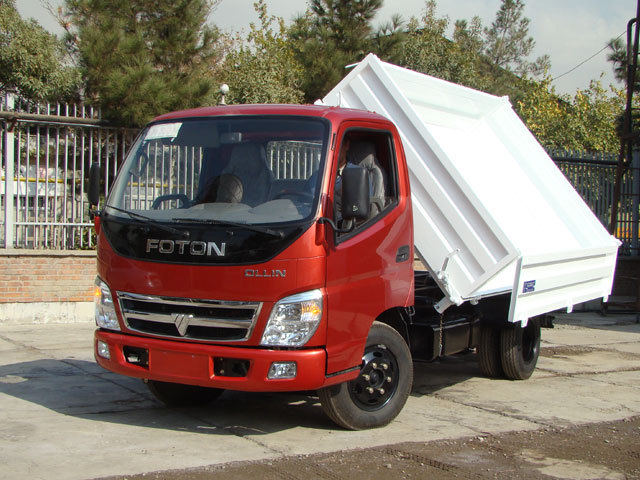
Three-Way Tipper

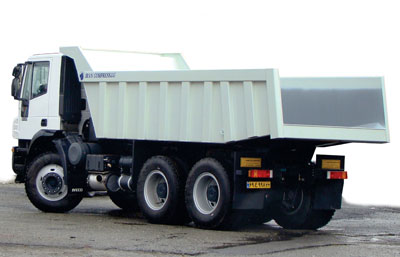
Classic Dump Truck

== See also ==
- List of Major Iranian Companies
- Iran Khodro Diesel
- Saipa Group
