= Hyundai Chorus =

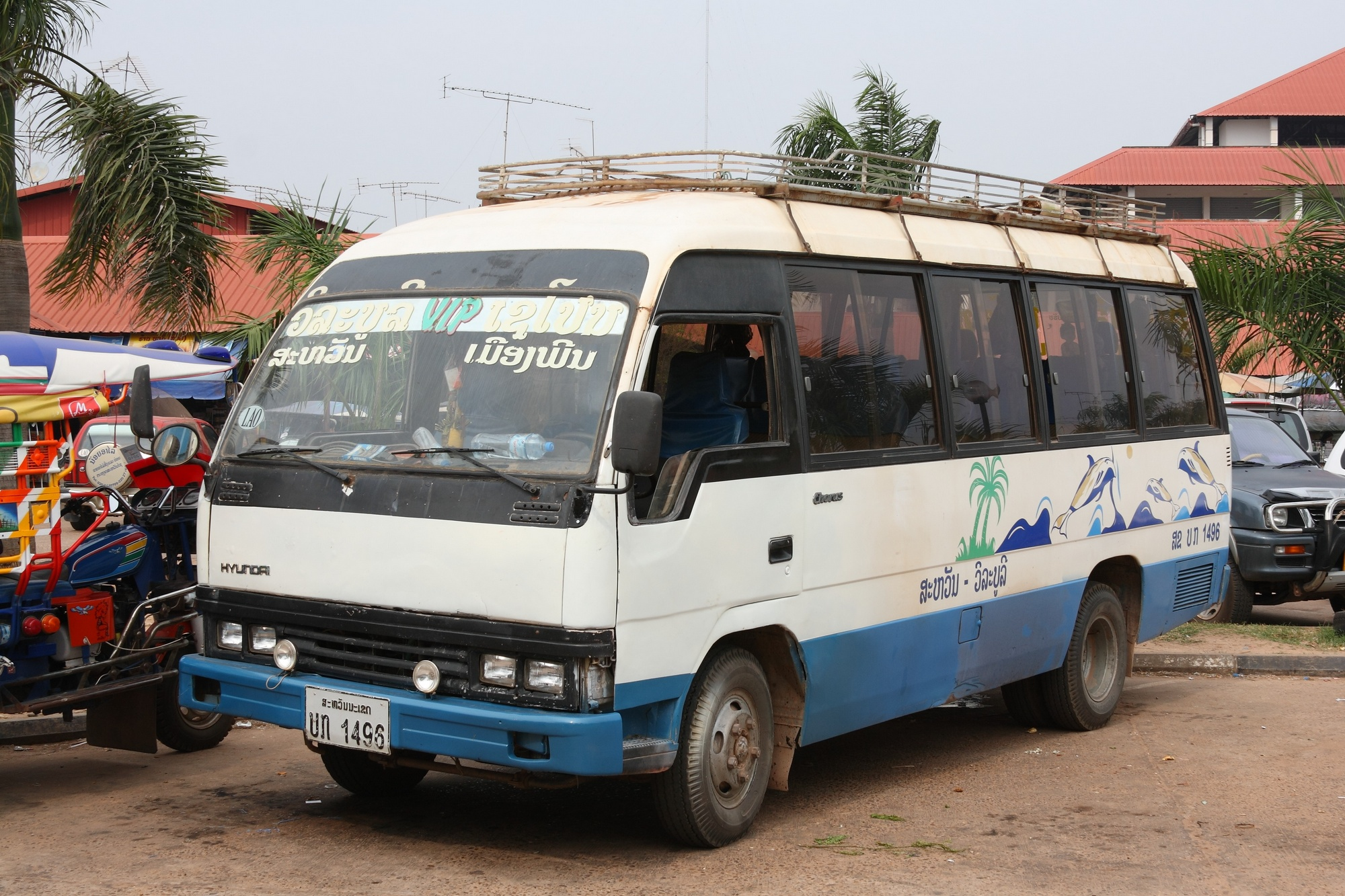

Overview
- Manufacturer: Hyundai Motor Company; Mitsubishi Motors Corporation
- Also called: Hyundai Mighty
- Production: Worldwide
- Designer: Hyundai Motor Company, Mitsubishi Fuso

Body and chassis
- Class: Minibus
- Body style: Single-deck bus
- Related: Mitsubishi Fuso Rosa

Powertrain
- Engine: Mitsubishi 117 HP
- Transmission: Hyundai/Mitsubishi (manual)

Chronology
- Predecessor: Hyundai DQ-7
- Successor: Hyundai County

The Hyundai Chorus (hangul:현대 코러스) is a minibus built by Hyundai Motor Company. The range was primarily available as tourist buses.

Most models of the bus are distinguishable by a front 'Chorus' badge, but the common Hyundai badge is usually used on the rear.

In Japan, Asia-Pacific, Mid-East, Africa, Europe, South America, its principal competitor is Kia Combi.

== Models ==
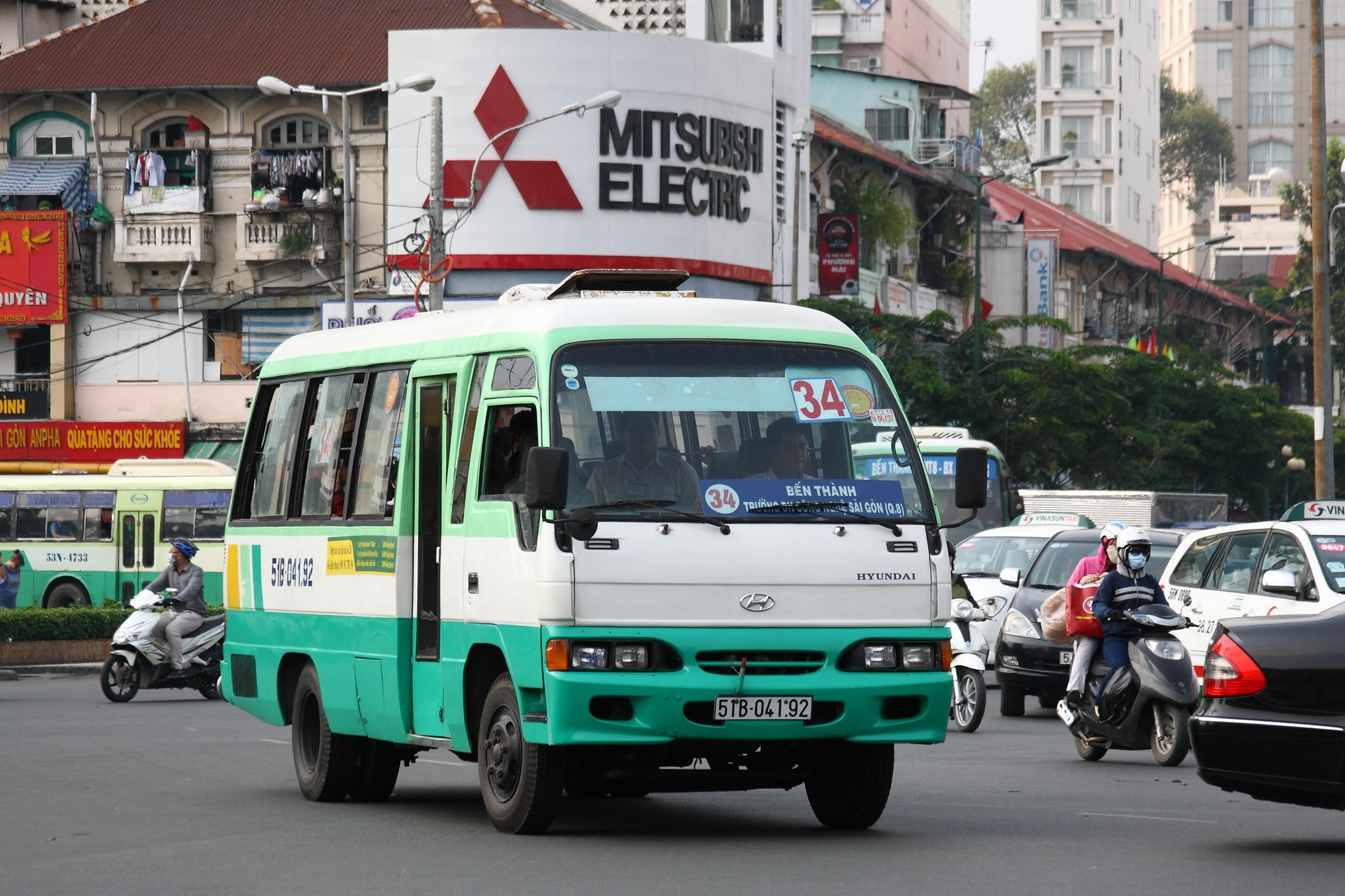
Late model

- 1st generation: Hyundai Motor Company & Mitsubishi Fuso design, platform and also called Hyundai Mighty, manufacture period: 1988-1994
- 2nd generation: Hyundai Motor Company & Mitsubishi Fuso design, manufacture period: 1994-1998
  - Chorus Private (16/25 passengers)
  - Chorus Tour (16/25 passengers)
  - Chorus Town (16 passengers)

== Cultural Influences ==
The Hyundai Chorus is mentioned in Steven Laine's book Iconoclast.

== See also ==
- Hyundai Motor Company
- Hyundai DQ-7
- Hyundai County
- List of buses
