= Mercedes-Benz L 337 =

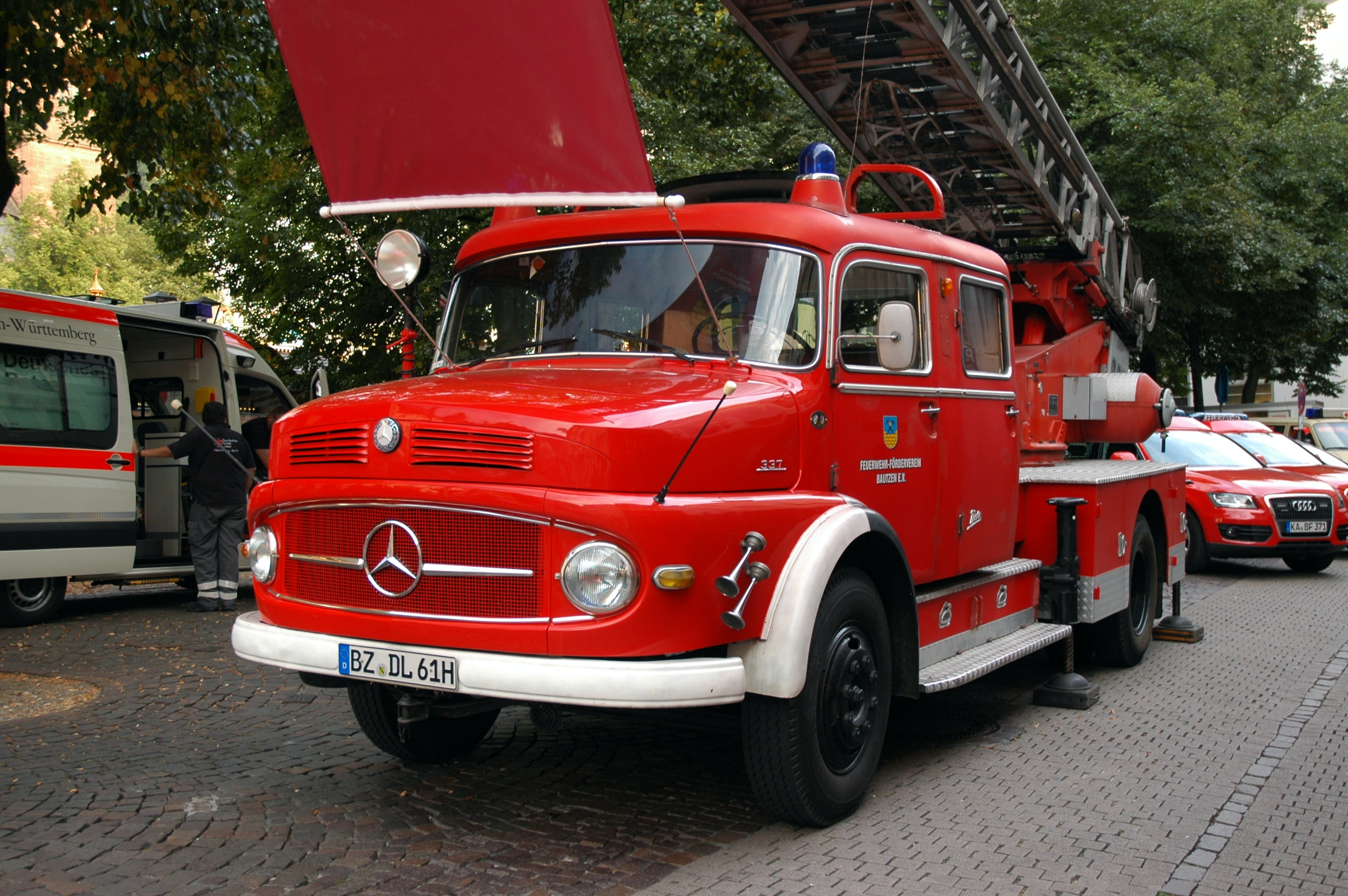
- Mercedes-Benz L 337 fire engine

Overview
- Type: Lorry
- Manufacturer: Daimler-Benz AG
- Production: 1959–1961
- Assembly: West Germany: Gaggenau

Body and chassis
- Class: 7.2 t lorry
- Body style: Conventional cab Forward control
- Layout: Front engine, rear-wheel-drive
- Platform: Mercedes-Benz L 337
- Related: Mercedes-Benz L 322

Powertrain
- Engine: OM 326 (Diesel, 10809 cm^{3}, 127 kW)
- Transmission: Manual five-speed synchromesh gearbox and two-speed planetary rear-axle; 10 forward, 2 reverse gears
- Propulsion: Tyres

Dimensions
- Wheelbase: 3700–5000 mm

Chronology
- Predecessor: None
- Successor: L 338

The Mercedes-Benz L 337 is a lorry made by Daimler-Benz, sold under the Mercedes-Benz brand. Introduced in March 1959, it was already discontinued in 1961, and replaced with the L 338. The L 337 is the first generation of Mercedes-Benz' heavy-duty "short-bonnet lorries", and has, in its default configuration, the "long" short bonnet, which is 300 mm longer than the typical Mercedes-Benz medium duty short-bonnet lorry's bonnet. Mercedes-Benz also offered the L 337 as a forward-control lorry, called the LP 337.

The L 337 was designed to comply with "Seebohm's legislation", which limited the maximum permissible total mass of lorries registered in West-Germany to 12,000 kg (plus another 12,000 kg of trailer mass). However, the L 337 was rendered obsolete by rescindment of this legislation in 1960.

== Models ==
- L 337: Base model, offered either as a rolling chassis or with a flatbed
- LK 337: Tipper lorry
- LP 337: Forward control lorry
- LS 337: Tractor
- LPS 337: Forward control tractor

== Description ==
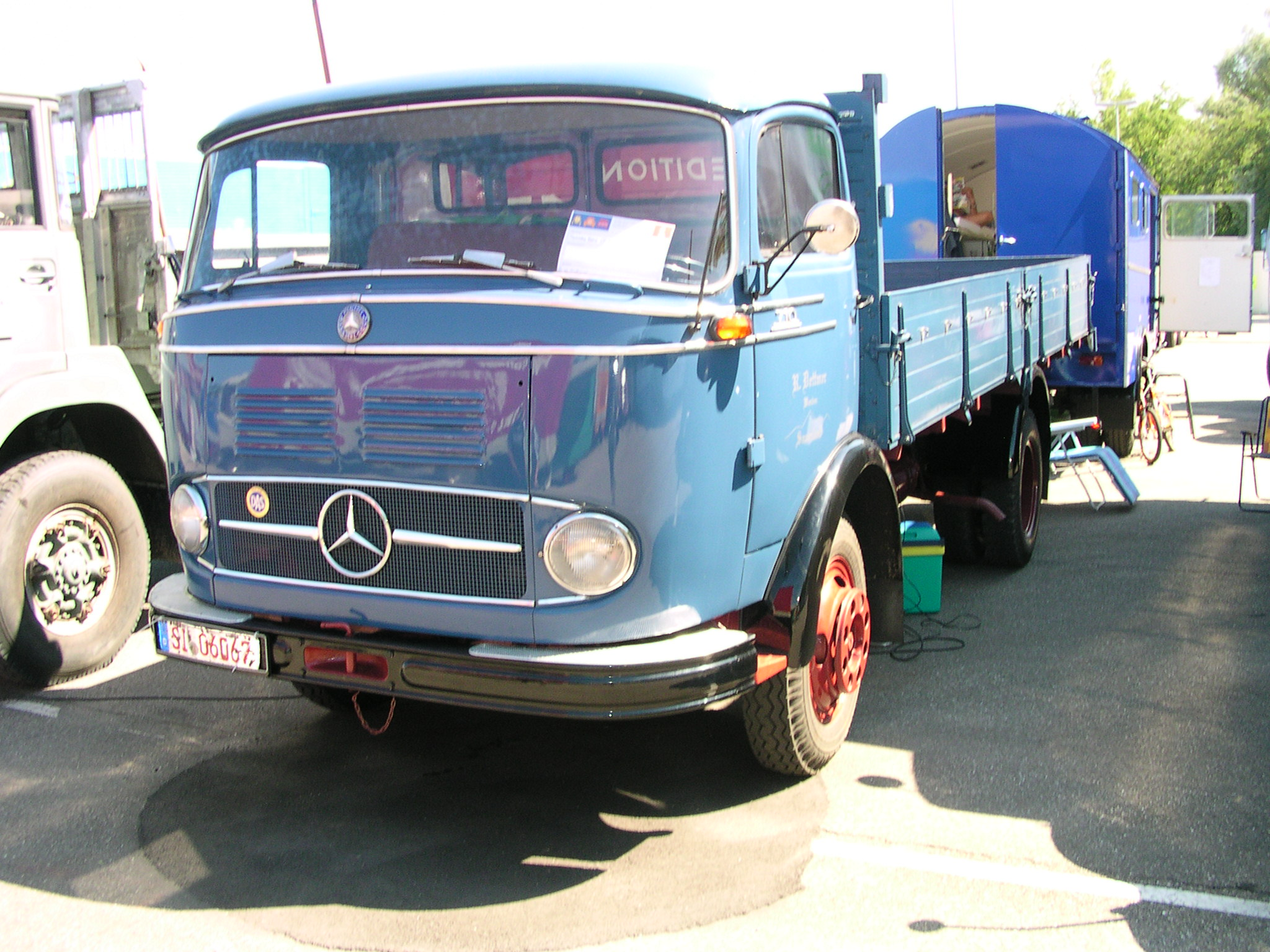
A Mercedes-Benz LP 710, which is technically different from the LP 337 (note the different front axle and rim), but otherwise has the same forward control cab

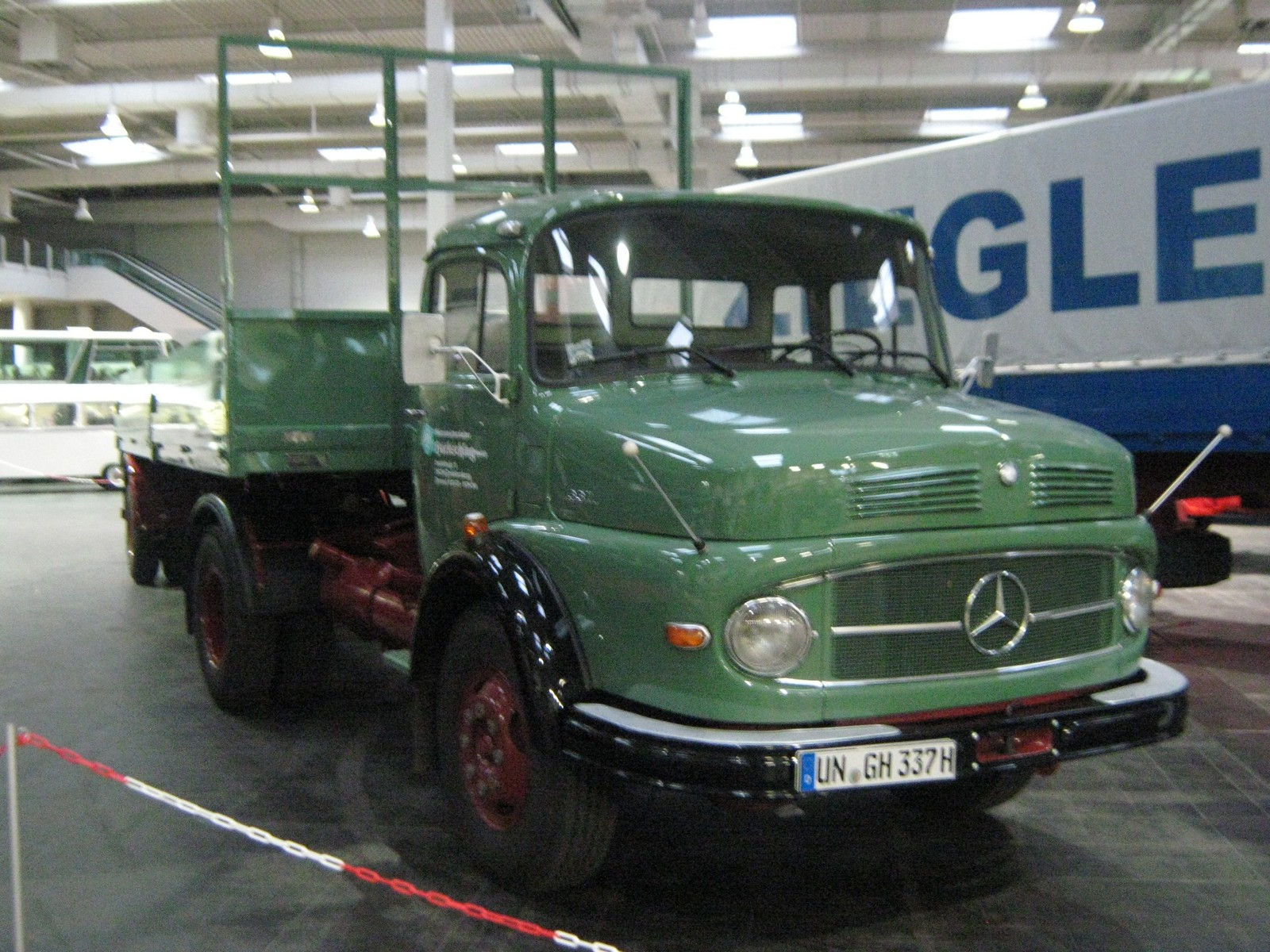
LS 337 tractor

The L 337 is a two-axle lorry with a total permissible mass of 12,000 kg and rear-wheel drive. It has a ladder frame with U-profile longitudinal sections. At launch, Mercedes-Benz offered three different wheelbase options, (3700 mm, 4200 mm, and 4400 mm); in 1960, a 5000 mm option was added. The cab is either the long version of the short-bonnet lorry cab (L, LK models), or the short version of the forward-control cab (LP models). From 1960, Mercedes-Benz offered a long variant of the forward-control cab (LP models).

Both front and rear axles are beam axles. The front axle is a stub (dead) axle, the rear axle is a hypoid drive (live) axle. Usually, such axles do not have additional reduction gearboxes if used in large on-road lorries. However, the L 337's hypoid axle was fitted with an additional, pneumatically-shifted two-speed planetary gearbox, giving the lorry 5 × 2 = 10 forward gears. This design allowed Daimler-Benz to install their modular Daimler-Benz G 32 synchromesh five speed gearbox, which otherwise would not have had proper gear spreading. The clutch used to transmit the torque from the engine to the gearbox is a dry Fichtel & Sachs GF 50 KR BH single-disc clutch. The engine used in the L 337 is the naturally aspirated, straight-six OM 326IV Diesel engine. It is precombustion chamber injected, water-cooled, and rated 190 hp (SAE gross) / 172 PS; 127 kW (DIN 70020).

== Technical specifications ==
Technical specifications (April 1959)
	L 337	LK 337	LP 337
Dimensions and weights
Wheelbase (mm)	4400	4200	3700/4200
Length (mm)	7650	7050	6960/7920
Width (mm)	2400	2430	2400
Height (mm)	2470	2490	2560
Front track width (mm)	1906		
Rear track width (mm)	1788		
Ground clearance (mm)	252		
Mass (kg)	4770	5370	4740/4950
Payload (kg)	7230	6630	7260/7050
Max. permissible mass (kg)	12,000		
Powertrain
Clutch	Dry single-disc clutch Fichtel & Sachs/GF 50 KR/BH		
Gearbox	Five-speed synchromesh gearbox Daimler-Benz G 32		
Driven axle	Rear axle		
Gear ratios	1st: 6.106:1; 2nd: 3.24:1; 3rd: 2.19:1; 4th: 1.467:1; 5th: 1:1; R: 5.64:1		
Top speed (km/h)	72.5		83.5
Brake drum area (cm^{2})	2830		
Engine
Type designation	Mercedes-Benz OM 326IV		
Type	Naturally aspirated straight-six Diesel		
Fuel system	Precombustion chamber injection; inline injection pump		
Valvetrain	Four overhead valves		
Cooling system	Water		
Bore × Stroke	128 × 140 mm		
Displacement	10,809 cm^{3}		
Power (DIN 70020)	172 PS (127 kW) at 2200 rpm		
Power (SAE gross)	190 HP at 2200 rpm		
Max. Torque (DIN 70020)	58 kp⋅m (569 N⋅m) at 1300 rpm		
Average piston speed	10.3 m/s		
Compression ε	20.5		
Mean effective pressure	6.75 kp·cm^{−2} (662 kPa)		
Injection pressure	135 atü (13.2 MPa)		
Firing order	1-5-3-6-2-4		
Inlet opens	31° before TDC		
Inlet closes	67° after BDC		
Outlet opens	69° before BDC		
Outlet closes	33° after TDC		
Engine mass	805 kg		
Rated fuel consumption (DIN 70030, in l/100 km)	18.1	–	
Fluid capacities
Fuel tank (l)	100		
Oil pan (l)	9–12		
Cooler (l)	40		
Gearbox (l)	3.7		
Electrical system
Starter motor	24-V sliding armature starter Bosch BPD 6/24 AR 169		
Generator	Bosch LJ/GK 300/12-1400 AR 18 (12 V, 300 W); Driven starting from crankshaft speeds of 660 rpm		
Batteries	2 × Lead-acid, 12 V, 105 Ah		
Sources			

== See also ==
- List of Mercedes-Benz vehicles
- List of Mercedes-Benz trucks
