= Iran Khodro Diesel =

Iranian vehicle manufacturing company

- Company type: Public limited company
- Industry: Manufacturing
- Founded: 1962; 64 years ago
- Headquarters: Tehran, Iran
- Area served: Worldwide
- Products: Heavy commercial vehicles, medium commercial vehicles, light commercial vehicles, quarry/construction site vehicles, special vehicles, city and intercity buses, firefighting vehicles, defence vehicles
- Parent: Iran Khodro
- Website: www.ikco.ir, www.ikd.ir

Iran Khodro Diesel Company (Persian: ایران خودرو دیزل) is manufacturer of commercial vehicles (trucks, buses, minibuses & vans) in Iran and several other countries with political agreements in the Middle East, CIS and Africa with half a century experience under license of Daimler-Benz of Germany. Iran Khodro Diesel Company has almost 80% of bus and about 70% of the local market share.

== History ==
Iran Khodro Diesel Company was established initially under the name of Khawar Industrial Group in early 1966. The company started its production by assembling one truck a day but after a short period due to the increase demand for commercial vehicles developed production and assembling lines.

In 1999 Iran Khodro Company merged its bus and midi-bus production lines with Khawar Industrial Group truck production lines together and the new company Iran Khodro Diesel, public joint stock was born to manufacture different types of commercial vehicles for domestic and overseas markets.

Today, Iran Khodro Diesel has a wide production site of 600,000 square metres (6,500,000 sq ft).

== Production and exports ==
The company's total annual productions is over 20,000 units of heavy and semi-heavy vehicles such as different types of truck chassis (tipper, trailers, lorries, cement mixers, fuel tankers, ...), buses (city buses, [Diesel & CNG], intercity buses and coaches, luxuries VIP buses) and minibus.

Iran Khodro Diesel Company has almost 80% of bus and about 70% of the local market share and exports its products to many countries like Armenia, Kazakhstan, Turkmenistan, Azerbaijan, Ukraine, the United Arab Emirates, the Kingdom of Saudi Arabia, Iraq, Jordan, Kuwait, Qatar, Yemen, Afghanistan, Syria, Algeria, Egypt, Libya, Sudan, Burundi, Burkina Faso, Ivory Coast, Senegal, Guinea, Gambia, Ghana, Venezuela, Egypt, Marshall Islands, Vanuatu, American Samoa and Tahiti.

== Products & Concepts ==
=== Products ===
eAtros: The first electric bus of Iran Khodro Diesel Industrial Group (IKD)

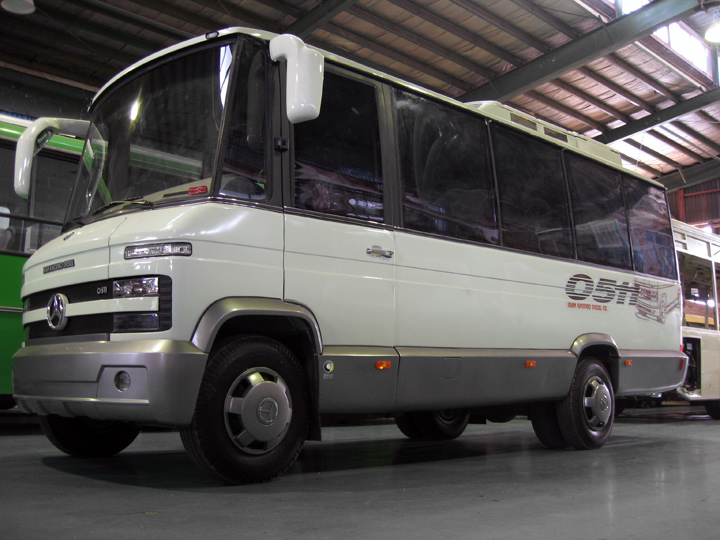
Iran khodro diesel Minibus O511 designed by Sivan design group

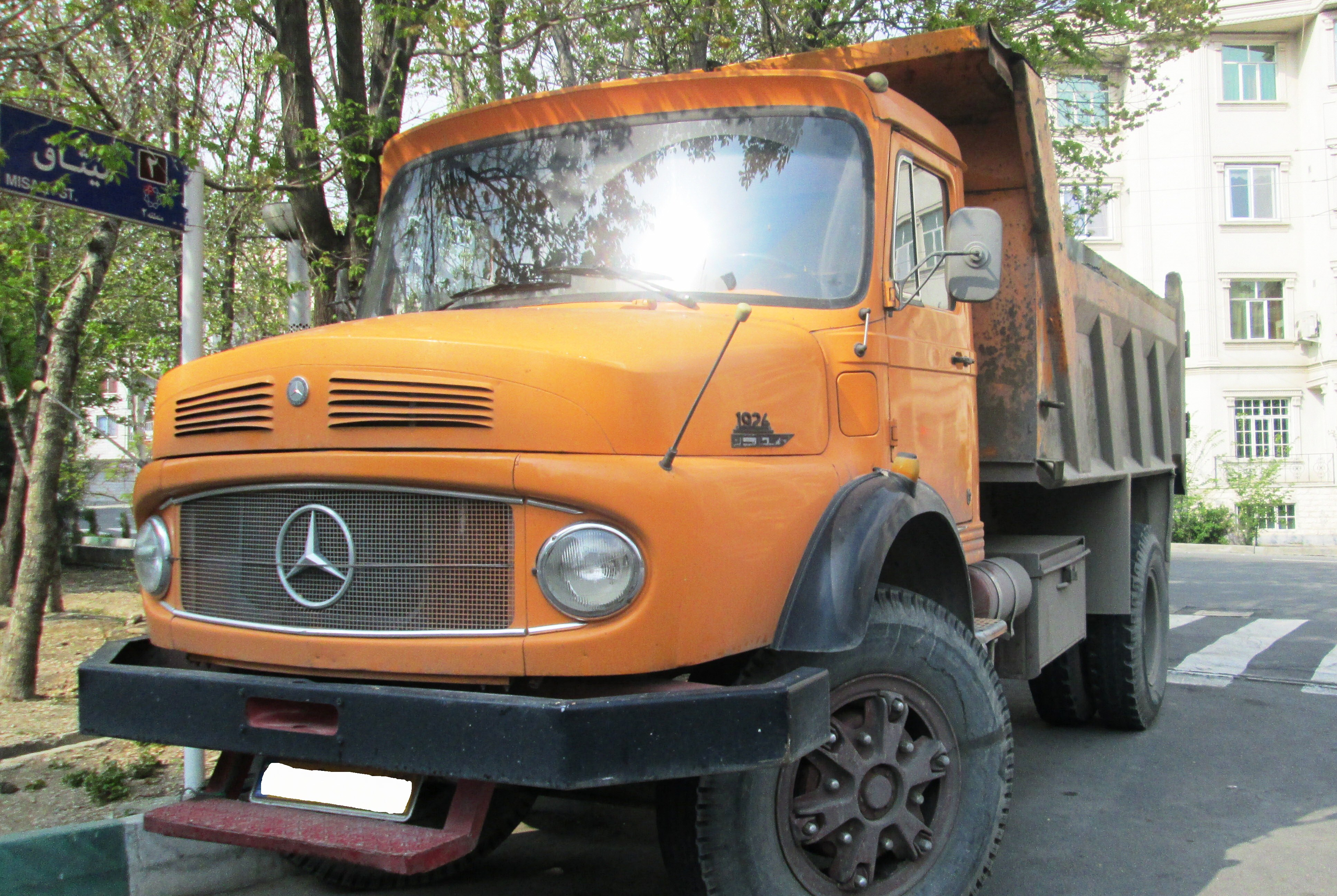
Mercedes Benz L-Lk 1924, made by Iran Khodro Diesel

Product name	Brief description
Mercedes-Benz Actros	Tipper
Mercedes-Benz Axor	Tipper & CARGO Truck
Mercedes-Benz Actros	Tractor Truck
Mercedes-Benz Axor	Tractor Truck
WH 2630S	Tractor Truck 6x4
WH 1943S	Tractor Truck 4x2
WH 2624LK	Tipper 6x4
WH 2624L	Cargo 6x4
WH 1924L	Cargo 4x2
WH 1924LK	Tipper 4x2
Khawar 608	Light truck
Hyundai Mighty	Light truck
Hyundai Chorus	Minibus
GAZelle	Van
Mercedes-Benz Sprinter	Ambulance
O457G&OSG	CNG City bus
eAtros 1247	Electric bus
Atros C1230	City Bus - Diesel & CNG
O457	City bus
MEGATRANS	City bus
C457	Intercity bus
CNHTC HOWO	Tractor Truck

=== Concepts ===
ConceptName	Brief Description
WH face-lift	Redesign of WH cab nose
Coach bus	Intercity bus
Minibus O511	Minibus
FLO 457	City bus

== Affiliated companies ==
Iran Khodro Diesel Company is holding by itself several affiliated companies manufacturing required components and parts for production namely as follows:
IDEM (Iran Diesel Engine Manufacturing)
Engine Manufacturer under license of Daimler-Benz Germany. From 2002 IDEM, IKD, TKC & EPCO entered to a mutual Project with overseas partners to convert Mercedes OM457 Diesel Engines to CNG dedicated Engines for buses and Hyundai D4AL Minibuses.
CHARKHESHGAR
Gearbox Manufacturer under the license of ZF Germany
VAMCO
Axles Manufacturer
GOVAH
After Sales and spare parts Service Company

== See also ==
- Iran Khodro
- Iranian automobile industry
