= Hyundai Mighty =

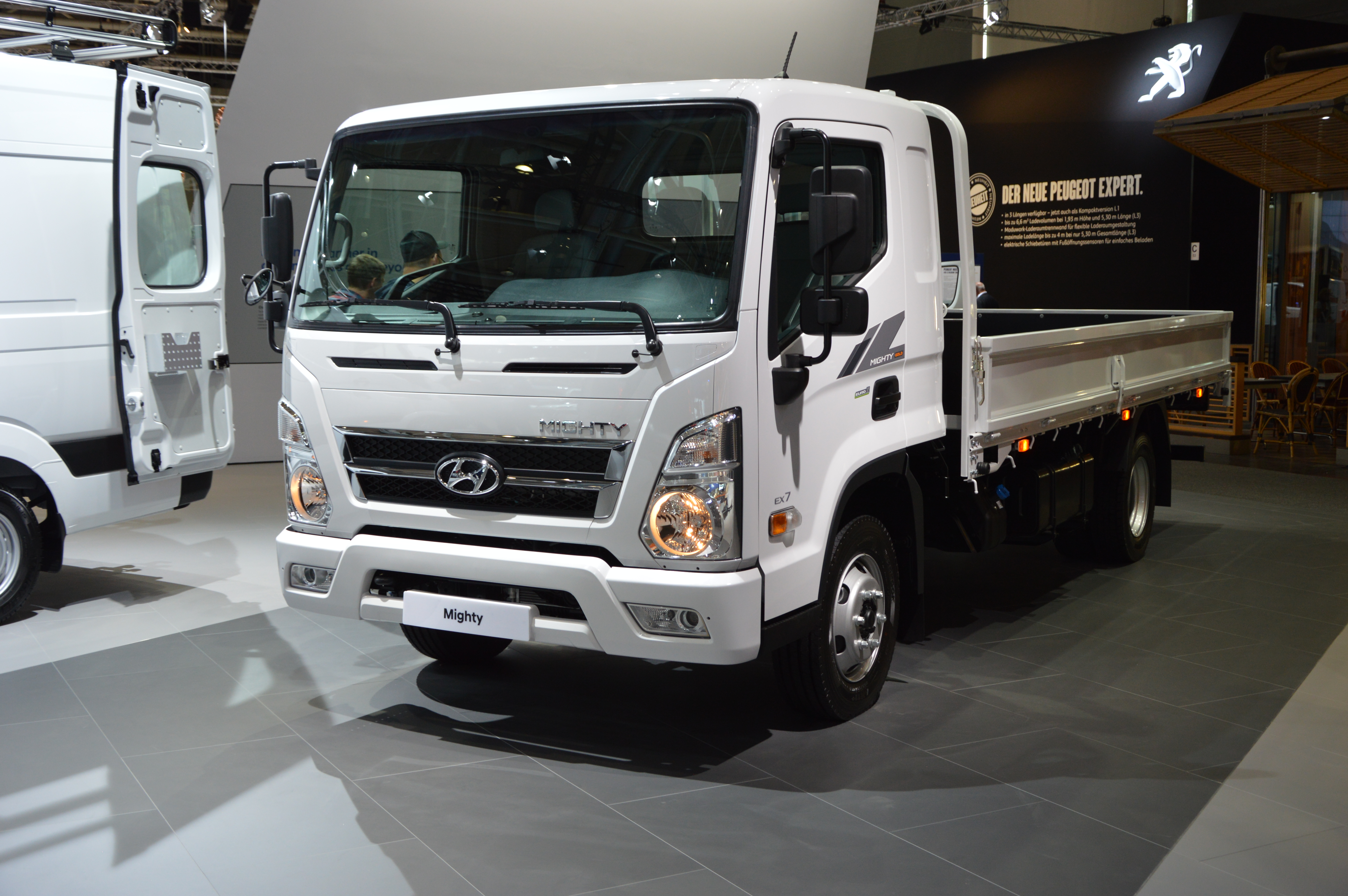

Overview
- Manufacturer: Hyundai Motor Company
- Production: 1987–present
- Assembly: Wanju, South Korea

Body and chassis
- Class: Truck
- Body style: standard cab crew cab

Powertrain
- Transmission: 6-speed manual 6-speed automatic

Chronology
- Predecessor: Hyundai Bison

The Hyundai Mighty and EX Series (Korean: 현대 마이티) is a line of light-duty commercial vehicles by Hyundai Motor Company. The range was primarily available in South Korea and some other countries.

== History ==
Manufactured from 1987 with the first cars going to Asia, other European and American countries which saw import or manufacture of the Mighty included Europe, Mid-east, Africa, and South America. Korea was another market until early 1987. In many markets, the Mighty was very expensive and was replaced by the Hyundai Truck when that model became available in 1987 to 1997. In North America, the Mighty was known as the Bering LD.

The overseas was another important market for the Mighty - to the extent that it was manufactured there from the 1980s using many local components. In Europe, Mid-East, Africa, South America, its principal competitors are Kia Titan, Kia Trade, Kia Frontier.

== First generation (F24; 1987) ==
First generation
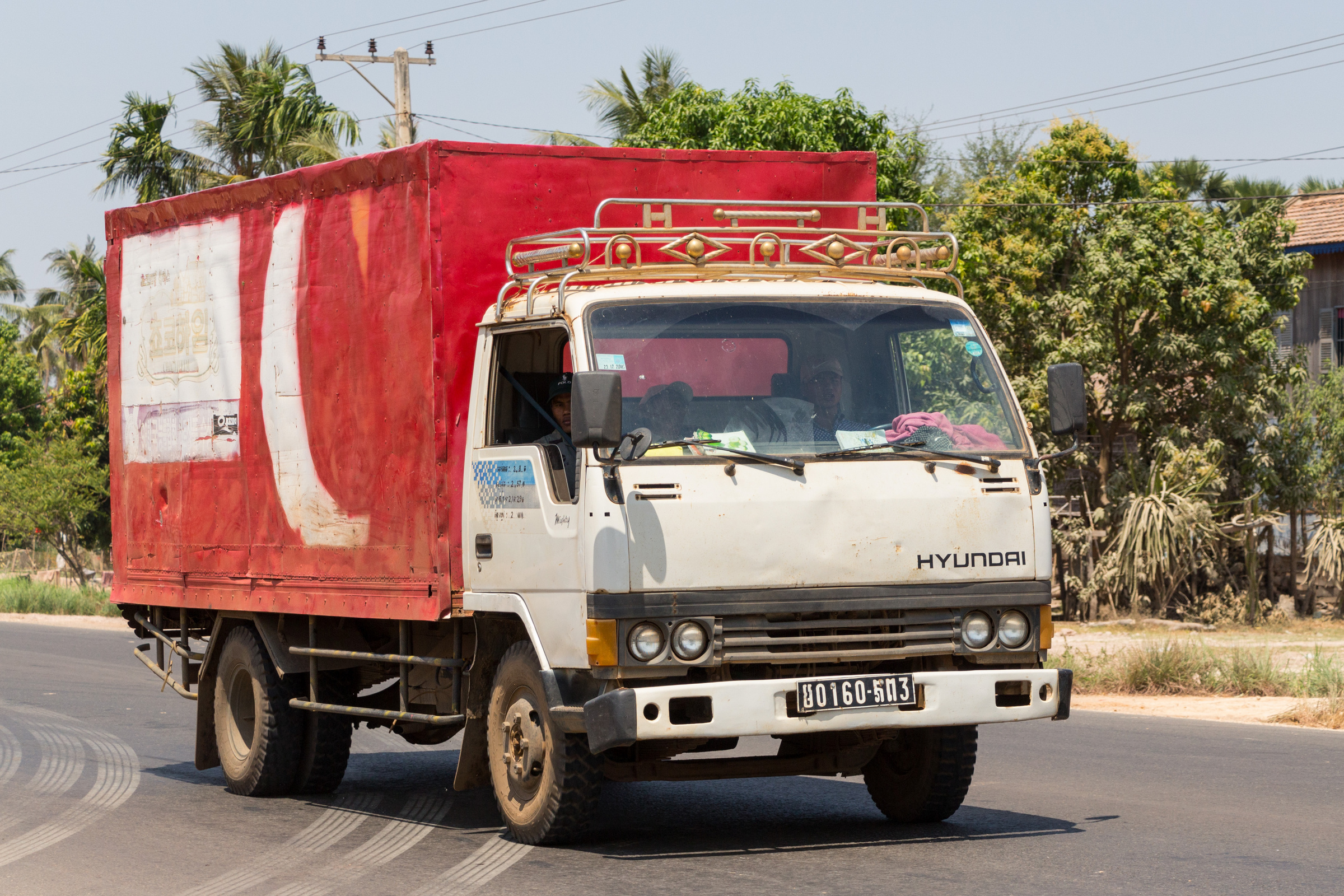

Overview
- Manufacturer: Hyundai Motor Company; Mitsubishi Motors Corporation
- Also called: Mitsubishi Fuso Canter
- Production: 1987–1998

Body and chassis
- Body style: Truck (standard cab, crew cab)

Powertrain
- Engine: D4AN; D4AK; K-1

The first-generation Mighty was based on the Mitsubishi Fuso Canter. In 1987, it was released as the first 2.5 tand 3.5 t trucks produced by Hyundai. At the time, the Kia Titan was a competing vehicle. A floor-shift type manual transmission was applied. In October 1998, the full model change vehicle, the Mighty II, was released and production was discontinued.

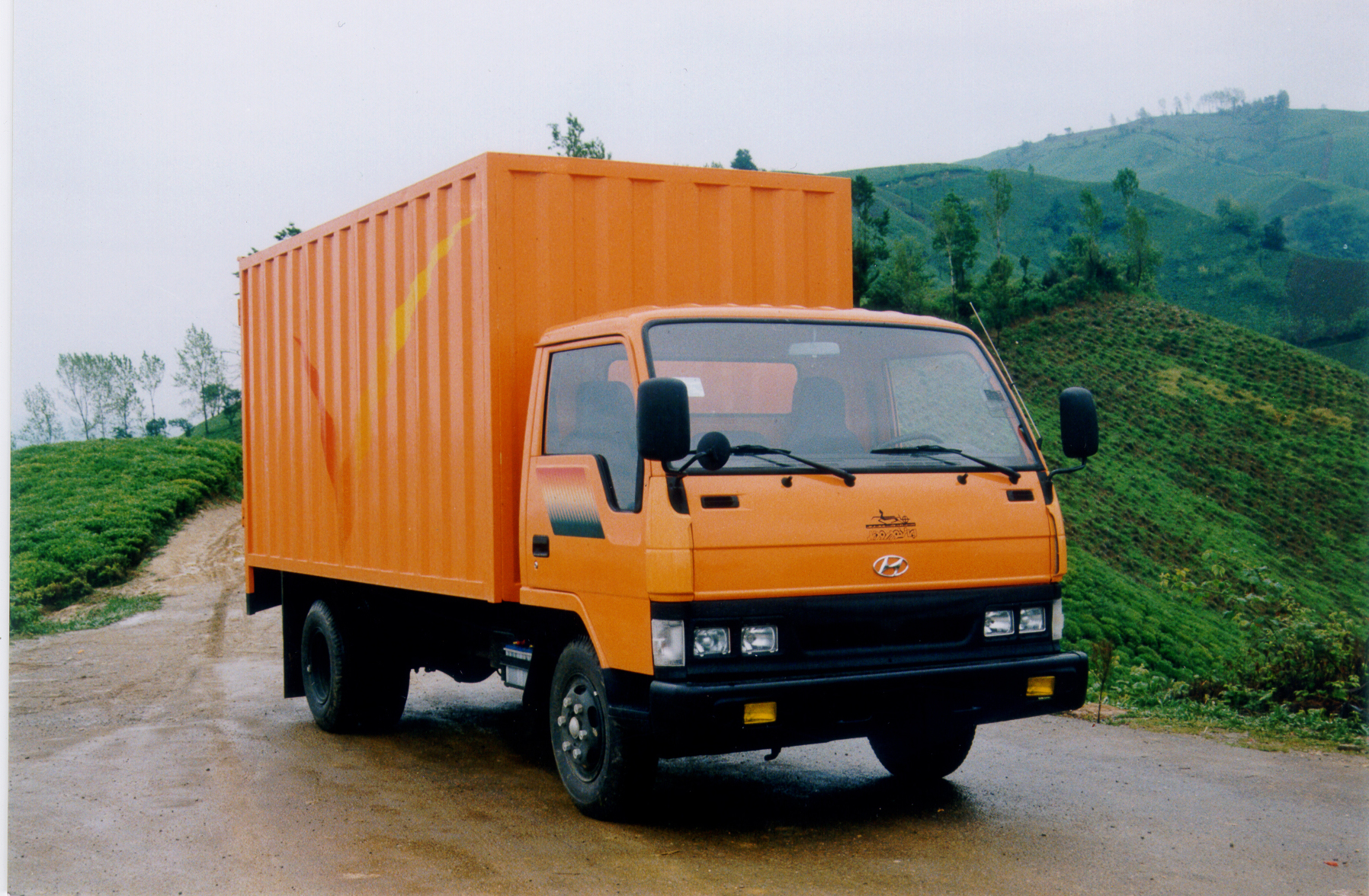
Hyundai Mighty (1st generation)

== Second generation (WT1; 1998) ==
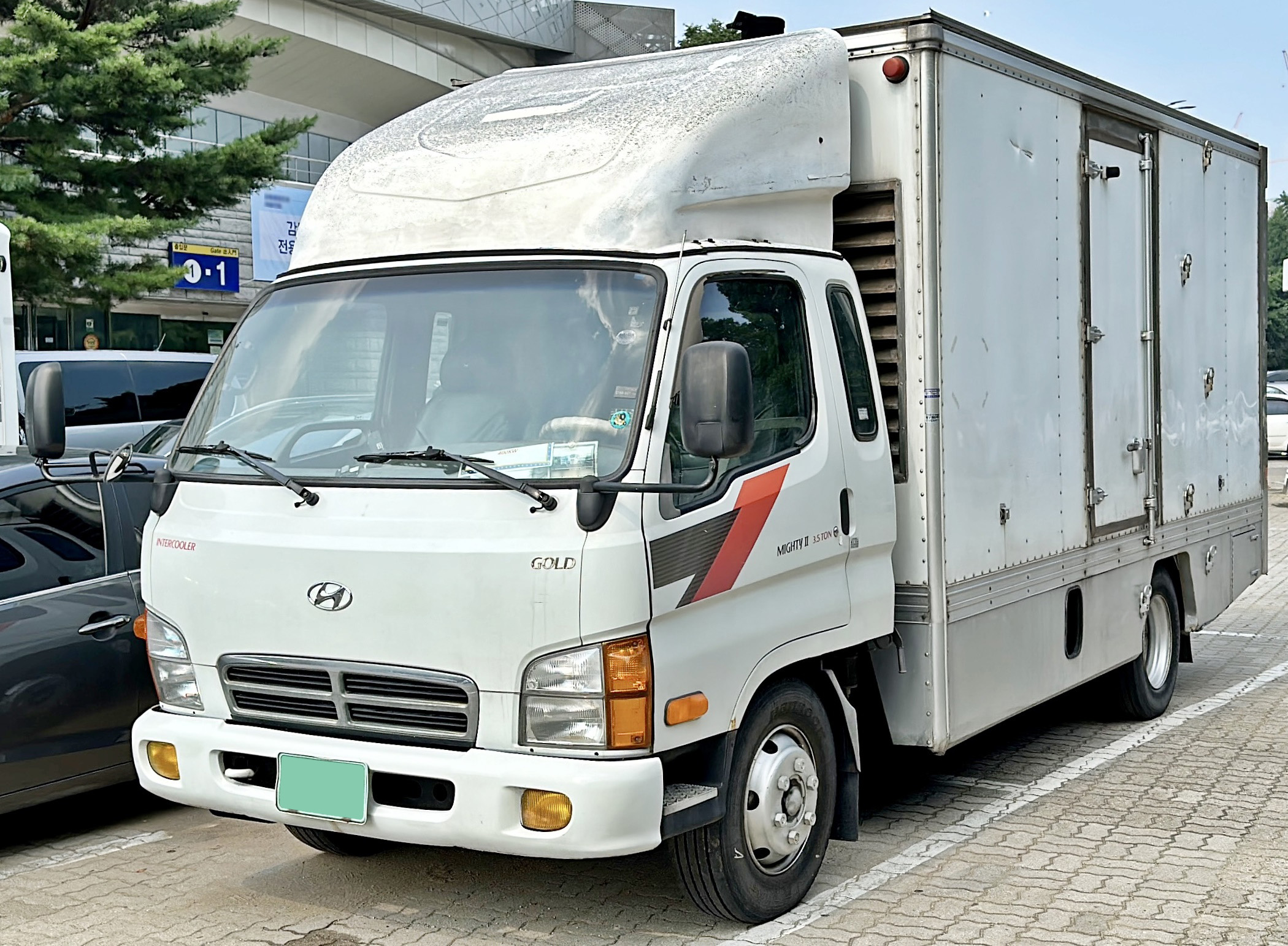
Hyundai Mighty (2nd generation, pre-facelift)

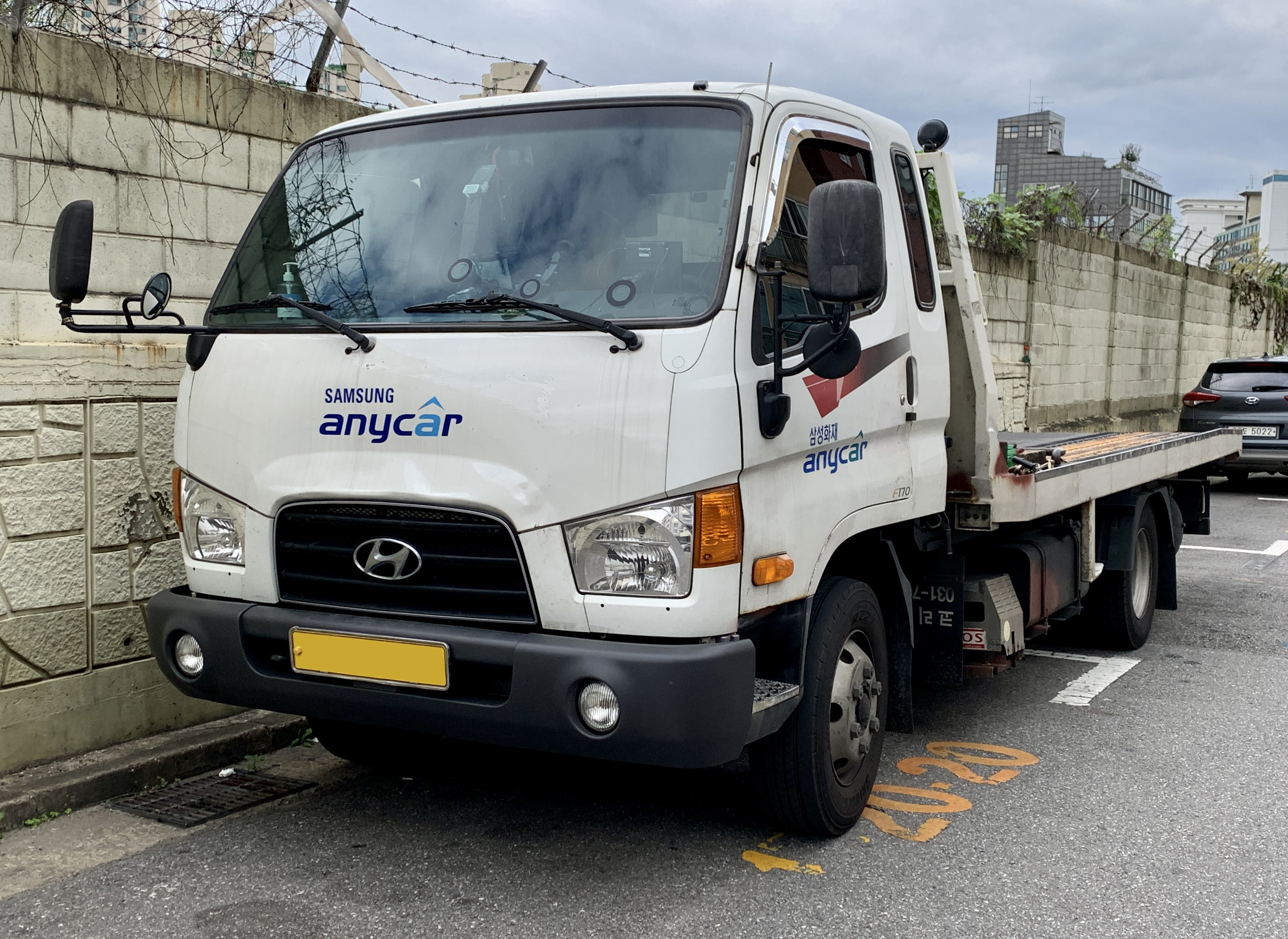
Hyundai Mighty (2nd generation, facelifted)

== Third generation (WQ; 2015) ==
Third generation
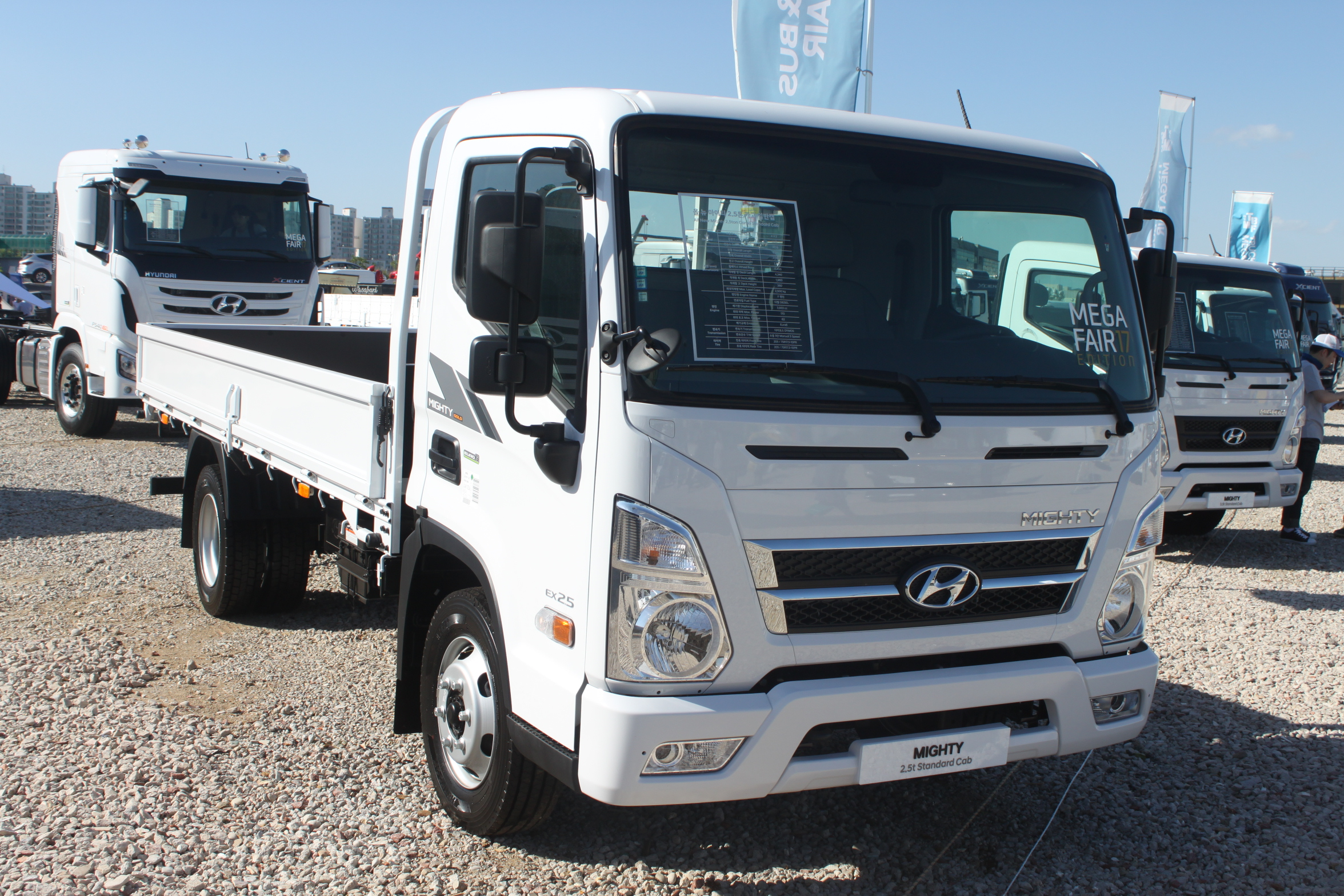

Overview
- Manufacturer: Hyundai Motor Company
- Production: 2015–present

Body and chassis
- Body style: Truck (standard cab, crew cab)

Powertrain
- Engine: Hyundai F710

Third generation has safety features such as 4-wheel disc brakes and Easy Hill Start (EHS). It is equipped with an Hyundai F engine that produces a maximum output of 170 hp and meets the Euro 6 standard. Starting with the 2025 model, the 4 t cargo model and the 10.3 t chassis cab model will be equipped with air suspension seats. All trims, including the regular cab and super cab, have a driver's seat belt height adjustment function, and the premium trim is equipped with power outside mirrors, door step lamps, and an electronically controlled dimming rearview mirror.
