= Automotive industry in South Korea =

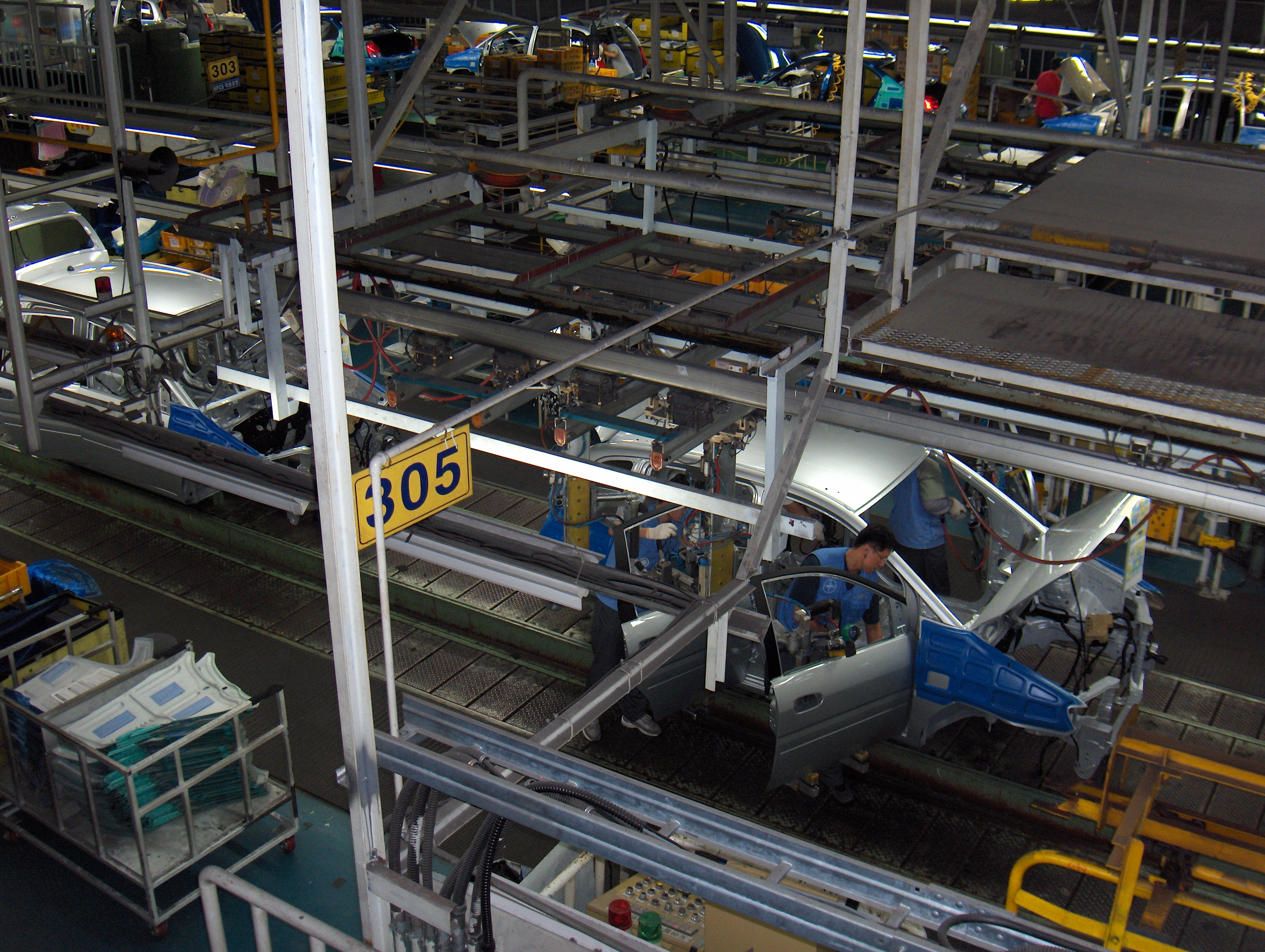
Assembly line at Hyundai Motor Company car factory in Ulsan, South Korea

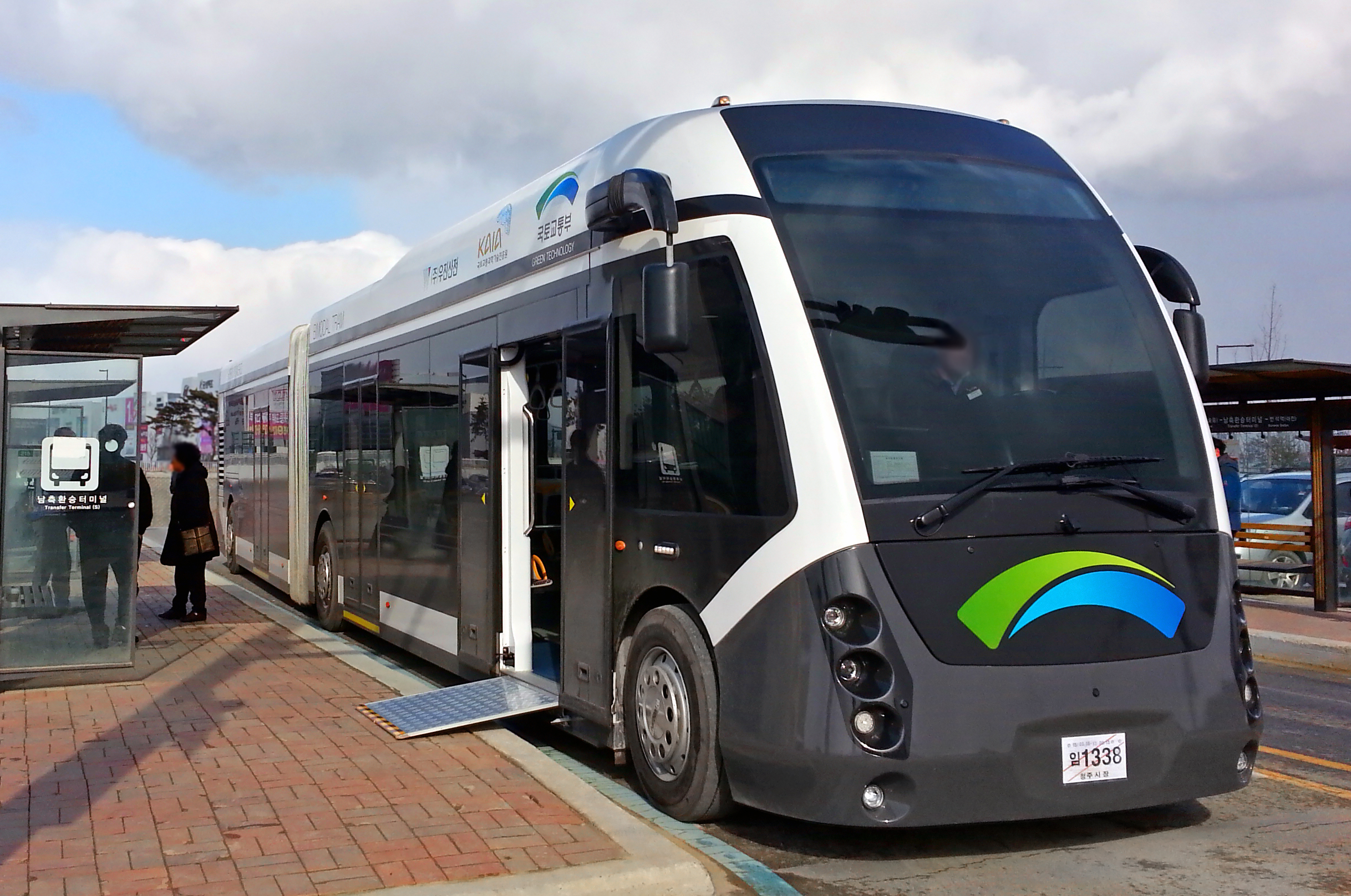
Woojin Apollo

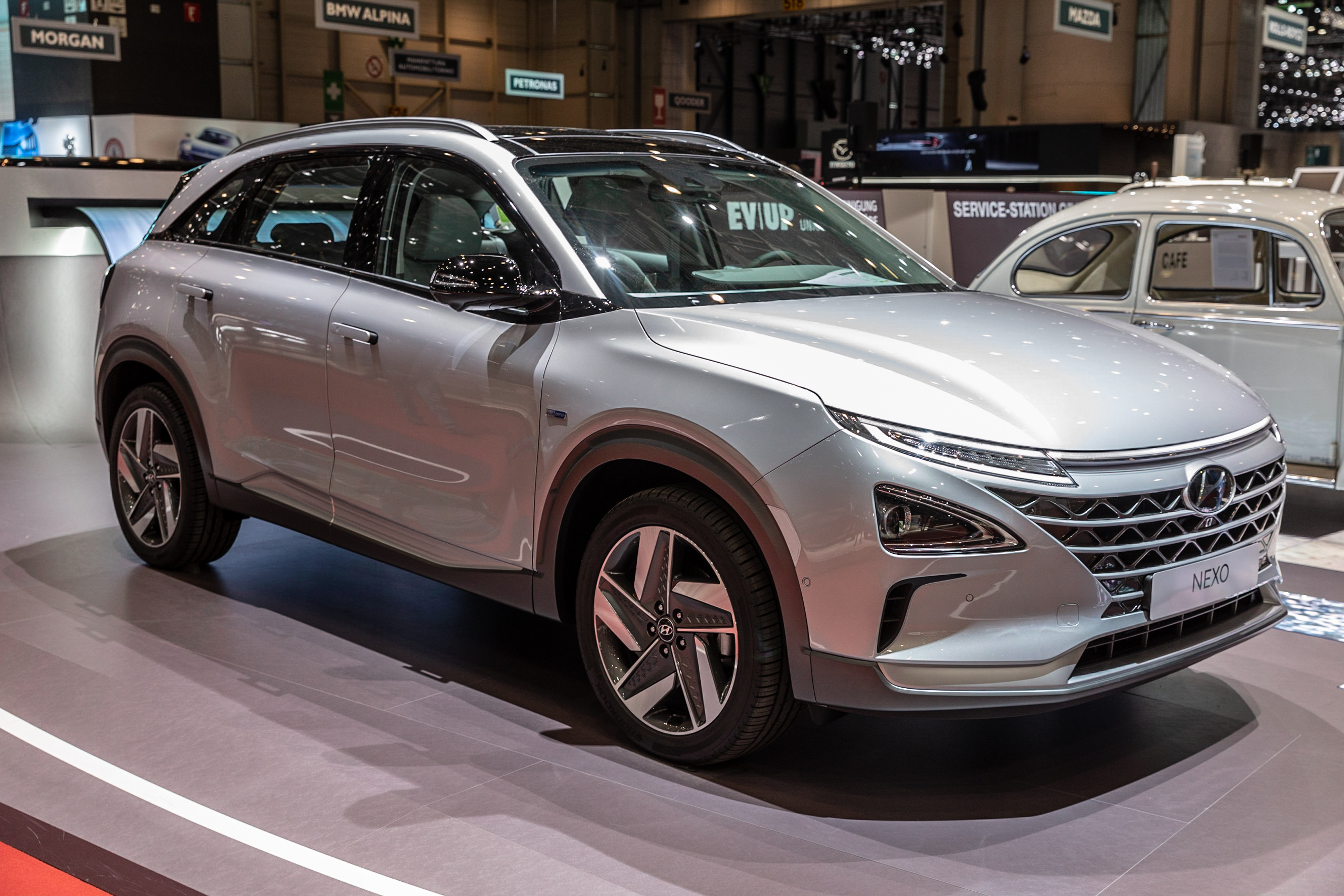
Hyundai Nexo

The automotive industry in South Korea is the fifth-largest in the world as measured by automobile unit production and also the five-largest by automobile export volume.

While its initial operations were merely the assembling of parts imported from foreign companies, South Korea is today among the most advanced automobile-producing countries in the world. Annual domestic output first exceeded one million units in 1988. In the 1990s, the industry manufactured numerous in-house models, demonstrating not only its capabilities in terms of design, performance, and technology, but also signalling its coming of age.

Major South Korean automobile manufacturers include GM Korea, Hyundai Motor Group and its affiliate Kia, along with Renault Korea.

== History ==
=== Origins ===
The history of the Korean automotive industry began in August 1955, when Choi Mu-seong, a Korean businessman, and two of his brothers (Choi Hae-seong and Choi Soon-seong), mounted a modified and localized jeep engine on a US military jeep-style car body made with the sheet metal from a junk oil drum can and military junk Jeep parts to manufacture its first car, called the Sibal (car). Sibal translates as a new go or a new start.

To develop the automobile industry, the Korean government announced an "Automobile Industry Promotion Policy" in 1962, and The Automobile Industry Protection Act to protect the infant industry. Foreign automakers were barred from operating in Korea, except in joint ventures with local business entities. The government's efforts led to companies that were established in other businesses entering the industry, and the formation of new startups. Three companies were established in 1962: Kyeongseong Precision Industry, which changed its name to "Kia Industry", and started assembling cars in cooperation with Mazda in 1962; Dongbang Automobiles, which was merged with Ha Dong-hwan Workshop and became Ha Dong-hwan Automobile Industry Co. (the predecessor of SsangYong Motor Company) in 1963; and Saenara Automobile, established with the technical cooperation of Nissan; it was the first automaker in Korea that was equipped with modern assembly facilities, and acquired by Shinjin Industries in 1965. Asia Motors was established in 1965, and the Hyundai Motor Company was established in 1968 with the technical cooperation of Ford. However, all these companies were then merely automotive assemblers, importing parts from overseas partners.

=== 1970 to 1990 ===
In 1970, Toyota began to show hesitation in continuing its relationship with Shinjin Automobiles. After Toyota's withdrawal in 1972, Shinjin entered into a joint venture with General Motors and formed General Motors Korea, which was renamed Saehan Motors in 1976. Kia opened its Sohari Plant in 1973 in Gwangmyeong, South Korea.

The Hyundai Pony, the first Korean-developed automobile, was built in 1975. Hyundai Motors accomplished this by engaging George Turnbull of British Leyland Motor Corporation as vice-president. The final result was a collaborative effort, comprising:

- design from Italdesign;
- transmission and engine from Mitsubishi;
- technology transfer (bodies) from Perkinson;
- car body molding from Ogihara Mold Company;
- machine press from France; and
- Funds from Barclays Bank and France Suez.

Hyundai chalked up another first when it exported the Pony to South America, in countries like Colombia, Venezuela and Ecuador between 1976 and 1982, making it the first Korean-developed car to be exported. In 1977, Motores Tecno in Costa Rica, became the first Hyundai distributor in Central America, where the Hyundai Pony pickup were sold.

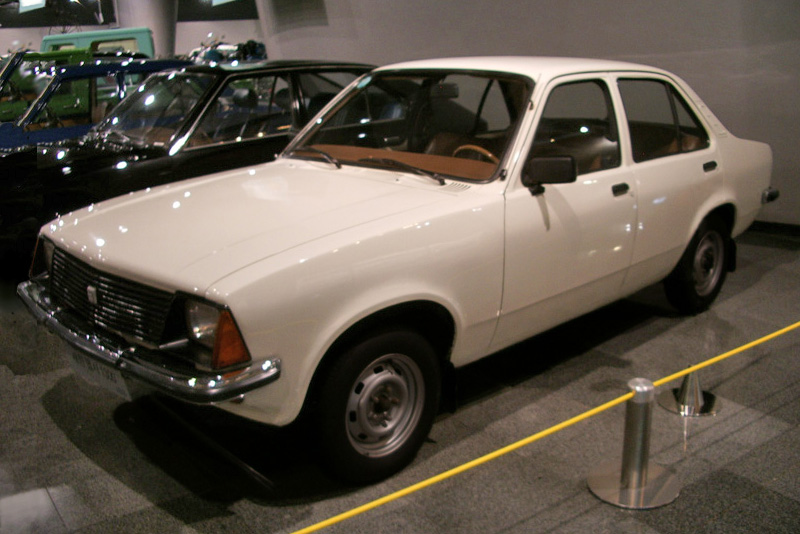
1982 Daewoo Maepsy

In 1982, the Daewoo Group gained control of Saehan Motors, and changed its name to Daewoo Motors in 1983. However, the Korean automobile industry suffered greatly from the 1979 energy crisis, and the consequent local recession. The government took action to resolve this difficult situation in 1982 by implementing the "Automobile Industry Rationalization Policy", the objective of which was to prevent excessive competition between the four major domestic automakers: Hyundai Motors, Kia Industry, General Motors Korea, and Asia Motors. Additionally, the government postponed its import liberalization of automobiles.

Shinjin Jeep Motors, which was a subsidiary of Shinjin Motors, changed its name to Geohwa Co. in 1981, and was taken over by Dong-A Motor Co. (formerly Ha Dong-hwan Automobile Industry Co.) in 1985. In 1986, the company was renamed the SsangYong Motor Company.

While localization of auto parts was the major concern during the 1970s, developing mass production system for the export-oriented industry became the issue during the 1980s. Hyundai entered the United States market in 1986 with the Excel (as the Pony was known there), and set a record for selling the most automobiles in its first year of business in the United States compared with any other car brand – 126,000 vehicles. Fortune magazine nominated the Excel for the "Best Product 10" award, largely because of its low price. However, the cars were of low quality and often broke down. This led to Hyundai having a poor reputation in the United States. With this initial success in the export market, the company began in 1989 to produce models, designed in-house and manufactured with its own technology, starting with the Sonata, a medium-sized sedan. The Sonata, nevertheless, still featured many Mitsubishi designs and parts.

=== 1990 to present ===
Hyundai's cumulative exports to the U.S. exceeded one million in 1990. In 1992 its ScoupeTurbo won at the Pikes Peak Hill Climb Rally, and in 1993 its Elantra was selected as the "Best Car of 1993" in Australia. Hyundai's Accent earned Canadian Best Buy Award in 1995, and its Avante also won the Asia-Pacific Rally that year. Yet, amidst all the successes, trouble was brewing for Hyundai. However this was not it.

The Excel, although initially well received, gave Hyundai a bad image, as over time its faults became apparent. Also, in efforts to bring the costs down, its quality and reliability suffered. As time caught up with the poor reputation of Hyundai in the United States, sales dropped drastically, and car dealerships started abandoning their franchises.

Rather than drop out of the world's largest automotive market, Hyundai began investing heavily in the quality, design, manufacturing, and long-term research of its vehicles in 1998, and added a ten-year or 100,000-mile warranty to its vehicles in the United States. This effort paid dividends for Hyundai, and in 2004 the company tied with Honda for initial brand quality, second in the industry behind Toyota, in a survey conducted by J.D. Power and Associates.

Towards the end of the 20th century, however, the industry began to face tremendous pressures at home, with the domestic market growing at under five percent, and greater competition, both locally and abroad. With energy waste, air pollution, and traffic congestion becoming more chronic, the Korean government has imposed the heaviest vehicle excise duty on automobiles and gasoline among the major automobile-producing countries. In 1985, the number of vehicles registered in Korea was one million, but by 1995 the total had increased to eight million. In response to these pressures, Korean automakers have become more aggressive in terms of pricing and quality, and begun developing larger cars, and broadening their product ranges to meet diverse customer preferences.

Internal pressures at home have also forced Korean automobile manufacturers to venture aggressively into international markets. In the early 1990s, Daewoo Motors also began to expand heavily throughout the world. Until 1996, its cars were all based on General Motors' models. After the Asian financial crisis that started in 1997, it took over the troubled SUV specialist, SsangYong, in 1998, but ran into financial trouble in 1999.

Asia Motors was completely merged with Kia (the new name for Kia Industry, changed in 1990) in 1999. Kia Motors had financial trouble in 1997, and helped push South Korea into the Asian financial crisis. Kia was subsequently acquired by Hyundai Motors in 1998.

Samsung's entry into the automobile industry was also ill-fated. Established in 1994, Samsung Motors, its car manufacture. started selling cars in 1998, just when South Korea was hit by the Asian financial crisis. Faced with financial difficulties, Samsung sold a seventy percent stake in the company to Renault in September 2000, and it was renamed Renault Samsung Motors. Samsung also ventured into the heavy vehicle market, founding Samsung Commercial Vehicles in 1996, although this second company filed for bankruptcy in 2000, ending the liquidation in 2002.

The purchase of Daewoo Motors by General Motors Corporation in 2002, and Hyundai's completion of a one billion dollar assembly plant in Alabama in 2005, are two major developments that will further drive the Korean automobile industry to focus on North America, its largest export market. The move to the U.S. makes Hyundai the sixth Asian automaker to build a U.S. factory, the third foreign maker to pick Alabama, and the sixth automaker to locate in the Southeastern United States since 1990. Now opening in 2009 is another U.S. factory that will be a twin to the Alabama factory. It is located in West Point, Ga and will build KIA cars.

As the world leader in rechargeable battery production, South Korean manufacturers rely on imports for more than 60% of battery material, most of which comes from China. This leaves South Korea vulnerable to trade tensions and geopolitical shocks with China and other countries in the region.

=== Timeline ===
==== 1950s ====
- 1955: Choi Mu-seong, a Korean businessman and two of his brothers mounted an engine on a modified US Army Jeep body and chassis to manufacture the historic model, called "Sibal";
  - Shinjin Industrial founded (precursor of Daewoo Motor);
  - Hyundai Civil Works Company founded by Chung Ju-yung;
  - Ha Dong-hwan Car Assembly Shop founded.

==== 1960s ====
- 1960: UNKRA funds $200,000 to Shinjin Industrial (LTD.) to build Busan Plant
- 1961: Government established "Industrial Standardization Act" and announced "Transportation Business Act and Road Traffic Act".
- 1962: Government established "5-Year Automobile Industry Plan", and announced the "Automobile Industry Protection Act";
  - Saenara Automobiles founded, in technical cooperation with Nissan Motor Co.;
  - Ha Dong-hwan Automobile Industry Co. founded;
  - Kyeongseong Precision Industry changed its name to Kia Industry.
- 1963: Shinjin Sinsungho launched.
- 1964: Government announced the "Automobile Industry Comprehensive Promotion Plan";
  - Kia Industry produced Mazda models under licensing;
  - Kia T-600 Triple Truck launched.
- 1965: Government announced "3-Year Automobile Localization Plan", with a goal to achieve 90% local content by 1967;
  - Asia Motors established;
  - Shinjin Automobiles took over Saenara Automobiles and Shinjin Corona launched with 20% local content assembled.
- 1967: Shinjin Crown, Sinjin Truck, and Sinjin Ace launched.
- 1967: Government announced the "Automobile Plant Permission Standards".
- 1968: Hyundai Motor Co. founded, and established licensing agreement with Ford;
  - Hyundai Cortina, Hyundai Ford 20M, Hyundai Ford D-series, and Hyundai Ford DK-Series launched.
  - Shinjin Publica first produced.
- 1969: Government announced "Basic Plan for Automobile Industry Promotion".

==== 1970s ====
- 1970: Gyeongbu Expressway fully opened;
  - Sinjin New Crown, Hyundai 0303 Benz bus, Kia Titan, and Kia Boxer launched;
  - Toyota showed hesitation in continuing with Sinjin Automobiles.
- 1972: Shinjin Automobiles joint-ventured with General Motors to form GM Korea, and launched Chevrolet 1700, based on Holden Torana model;
  - Kia Brisa (1974–1982) (K303) launched, based on Mazda Familia model;
  - Kia KB truck launched, based on Hino truck model;
  - Sinjin Automobiles launched Jeep under licensing from American Motors;
- 1973: Hyundai New Cortina launched.
  - Kia opens the Sohari Plant in Gwangmyeong.
- 1974: Government set goal of half a million vehicles to be built annually, with the announcement of the "Automobile Industry Promotion Plan";
  - Sinjin Automobiles joint-ventured with American Motors on 50-50 basis to form Sinjin Jeep Company;
  - GM Korea Rekord, based on Opel Rekord, launched.
- 1975: Government established "Systematization Promotion Act" for medium and small enterprises in automobile industry;
  - Hyundai Motor Co. established its own research institute, and produced Hyundai Pony, the first Korean-developed car, designed by ItalDesign and based on Mitsubishi technology. The car is imported to Britain, where Korean cars have never been sold before.;
  - GM Korea's Camina launched, based on the Holden Torana.
- 1976: Hyundai Motor made Korean history by exporting the "Pony" to the Republic of Ecuador;
  - Kia Industry took over Asia Motors Co.;
  - GM Korea changed its name to Saehan Automobiles, and produced Saehan Gemini (based on Opel Kadett and Isuzu Gemini models), and Saehan Elf (based on Isuzu Elf);
  - Hyundai truck launched, based on a Mitsubishi Fuso model; Hyundai HD1000, and Hyundai Vison also launched.
- 1977: Ha Dong-hwan Automobiles changed its name to Dong-A-Motors.
  - Saehan (SMC) BF101 bus launched
- 1978: Hyundai Ford Cortina Mark IV, Hyundai Ford Cortina Mark V, and Hyundai Ford Granada launched;
  - Saehan Rekord and Saehan Royale Salon, both based on Opel Rekord, also launched.
- 1979: Shinjin Jeep Motor Co. changed its name to Shinjin Motor Company as the company became a domestic corporation;
  - Kia Bongo truck launched.

==== 1980s ====
- 1980: Government announced integration of automobile industry, limiting internal competition and restricting the types of products each company could manufacture.
- 1981: Sinjin Automobiles changed its company name to Geohwa Company.
- 1982: Hyundai Pony II and Hyundai FB buses, Kia Bongo van launched.
- 1983: Saehan Automobiles changed its name to Daewoo Motor, while partnering with General Motors;
  - Daewoo BV101 bus launched, based on Isuzu truck model.
  - Daewoo Royale series launched;
  - Hyundai Stellar launched;
  - Hyundai Motors established Hyundai Auto Canada Inc.;
  - Keohwa's Korando launched.
- 1984: Hyundai Pony-Excel, and Hyundai Presto launched;
  - Asia Combi launched.
- 1985: Ministry of Commerce and Industry postponed import liberalization of automobiles;
  - Dong-A Motor Co. took over Keohwa Co.;
  - Kia Besta launched;
  - Number of vehicles registered in South Korea exceeded one million.
- 1986: Government designated automobile industry for rationalization, based on the "Industry Development Act";
  - Government revised the "Road Transportation & Vehicle Act, and other related regulations;
  - Three years of strikes begun in the automotive industry, leading to an average increase in wages of 100% by 1989;
  - Dong-A Motor Co. took over Geohwa Co. and renamed it Ssangyong Motor Co.;
  - Hyundai Excel, and Hyundai Presto AMX Model, launched and exported to United States;
  - Hyundai Excel nominated by Fortune magazine for the "Best Product 10" award;
  - Daewoo Le Mans, based on Opel Kadett, launched.
- 1987: Government cancelled "Automobile Industry Rationalization Plan";
  - Government introduced import liberalization of commercial vehicles between 1,000 and 2,000 c.c.;
  - Transportation Ministry revised "Enforcement Decree of the Automobile Management Act";
  - Kia Pride, Kia Concord, Asia Topic, and Kia Jumbo Titan launched;
  - Hyundai Truck (new model), Hyundai Grace, Hyundai Porter, and Hyundai Mighty launched, based on Mitsubishi Delica, Mitsubishi Canter, and Fuso model.
- 1988: Annual domestic automobile production volume exceeded one million units;
  - Korea Automobile Manufacturers Association (KAMA) established;
  - Hyundai named "Official Car" for the 1988 Summer Olympics;
  - Hyundai Chorus and Hyundai Sonata (new model) launched;
  - SsangYong Korando family launched.
- 1989: Hyundai Motor completed construction of its plant in Bromont, Canada;
  - With the increase in labor cost and a strong currency, coupled with a booming domestic market and outdated products, exports dropped by 40 percent year-on-year;
  - Hyundai Sonata launched, using in-house design, but still featuring Mitsubishi technology;
  - Third generation Hyundai Excel, Hyundai Porter 1.25 ton launched;
  - Kia Capital and Kia Wide-Bongo launched, along with Kia Motors's import model, Mercury Sable.

==== 1990s ====
- 1990: Hyundai's cumulative exports to the U.S. surpassed 1 million in 1990;
  - Kia Industry changed its name to Kia Motors Co.;
  - Hyundai Scoupe, and Hyundai Elantra launched.
- 1991: Hyundai Sonata (new model) launched;
  - Kia New Besta and Kia Towner launched;
  - Daewoo Prince, Daewoo Brougham, Daewoo Tico, Daewoo Damas, and Daewoo LeMans (new model) launched.
  - Kia enters the European market with exports of its Pride hatchback, derived from the Mazda 121 of 1987.
- 1992: Hyundai Scoupe (new model) launched; ScoupeTurbo won at the "Pikes Peak Hill Climb Rally";
  - Kia Sephia, and Kia Potentia launched.
- 1993: Hyundai Elantra (new model launched), and was selected "Best Car of 1993" in Australia;
  - Kia named "Official Car" for Daejeon Expo.
- 1994: Samsung Motors founded.
  - The Kia brand launched in the United States
- 1995: Number of vehicles registered in South Korea exceeded eight million;
  - Hyundai's Accent earned "Canadian Best Buy Award", and also won the "Asia-Pacific" Rally;
  - First Seoul International Motor Show.
  - Daewoo begins importing cars to Britain, aided by a revolutionary sales package where cars are sold directly to customers from the manufacturer rather than through a traditional dealer network.
- 1997: Kia Motors went into financial trouble, and helped push South Korea into the Asian financial crisis.
- 1998: Hyundai began investing heavily in quality, design, manufacturing, and long-term research, and added a 10-year or 100,000-mile warranty to its vehicles in the United States;
  - Samsung Motors started selling cars;
  - 51% of Kia Motors acquired by Hyundai Motor;
  - Daewoo Motors took over the troubled SUV specialist, SsangYong
- 1999: Asia Motors completely merged with Kia Motors Company.

==== 2000s ====
- 2000: Samsung sold a 70% stake in Samsung Motors to Renault, and the company was renamed Renault Samsung Motors.
  - Daewoo Motors divests of SsangYong Motor Company
- 2002: Major assets of Daewoo Motors acquired by General Motors. The new company was named GM Daewoo.
- 2004: Hyundai tied with Honda for initial brand quality, second in the industry behind Toyota, in a survey conducted by J.D. Power and Associates.
  - Shanghai Automotive Industry Corporation (SAIC) acquires 49% of SsangYong Motor Company.
- 2005: Hyundai completed construction of its $1 billion assembly plant in Montgomery, Alabama;
  - GM Daewoo vehicles were exported under various GM brands (and Suzuki), but mostly as Chevrolets

==== 2010s ====
- 2011: GM Daewoo renamed itself to GM Korea, and in March, all GM Daewoo products are sold in South Korea as Chevrolets.
- 2011: After the renaming of GM Korea, the Daewoo Damas and Daewoo Labo has not worn any marque.
- 2011: GM Korea developed a new Luxury brand called GM Alpheon.
- 2015: Hyundai launched new luxury brand called Genesis
- 2017: EES acquired TGM, formerly known as bus manufacturing department of Hanguk Fiber. And established Edison Motors.

==== 2020s ====
- 2021: Kia Motors changed its name to 'Kia' and change their slogan as 'Movement that inspires'.
- 2021: Hyundai launched first EV brand's vehicle. Hyundai Ioniq 5.
- 2021: First Gwangju Global Motors product, Hyundai Casper began production.
- 2022: Kia EV6 was named as European Car of the Year and North American Car of the Year. And Renault Samsung Motorswas changed as Renault Korea Motors and its symbol.
- 2023: Ssangyong was changed as KG Mobility (KGM), due to KG Group from South Korea acquired it. And they also acquired former Edison Motors and changed its name 'KGM Commercial'
- 2024: Renault Korea Motors was changed as Renault Korea and changed its logo to the Renault’s lasagne logo. Also, change the model name and started to increase the proportion of imported cars.

== Automobile manufacturers and products ==
=== Hyundai Motor Company ===
==== Ioniq ====
- Ioniq 5/Ioniq 5 N
- Ioniq 6/Ioniq 6 N
- Ioniq 9

==== Passenger cars ====
- Accent/Verna (Discontinued in Korea)
- Elantra/Avante
- Grandeur/Azera
- i10 (Not sold in Korea)
- i20 (Not sold in Korea)
- i30/Elantra Touring (Discontinued in Korea)
- i40 (Discontinued)
- Sonata
- Veloster N (Discontinued)

==== SUVs and vans ====
- Entourage (Only in US; Discontinued)
- ix20 (Discontinued)
- Libero (Discontinued)
- Porter
- Santa Fe
- Starex/Grand Starex (Discontinued)
- Staria/ST1 - Sold as Iveco eMoovy
- Tucson
- Nexo
- Kona
- Palisade
- Casper/Casper Electric/Inster (ICE version sold only in South Korea; Made by Gwangju Global Motors (GGM))
- Venue

==== Commercial vehicles ====
- Mighty II
- e-Mighty
- County
- Truck (8/25-ton truck)
- Super Truck 5ton/4.5ton (HD Series)
- Super Truck (HD Series)
- Aero Town
- Super Aero City
- Universe
- HD120
- HD160
- HD170
- HD260
- Xcient/Xcient Fuel Cell
- Elec City
- Elec City Town
- Pavise
- HD50S (Modern Jeepney; Only in Philippines)
- Hongtu (Only in China)

=== Genesis ===
- G80
- G90
- G70
- GV80
- GV70
- GV60

=== Kia Corporation ===
==== Passenger cars ====
- Amanti/Opirus (Discontinued)
- Cadenza/K7 (Discontinued)
- Ceed (Not sold in Korea)
- K3/Forte/Cerato (Discontinued)
- K4 (Not sold in Korea)
- Morning/Picanto
- Rio (Discontinued, Not sold in Korea)
- Spectra/Cerato (Discontinued)
- Stinger (Discontinued)
- Visto (Discontinued)
- K5
- K8
- K9

==== SUVs and vans ====
- Ceres (Discontinued)
- Topic (Discontinued)
- Towner (Discontinued)
- Bongo/K-Series
- Carens/Rondo (Discontinued)
- Carnival/Sedona
- Mohave (Discontinued)
- Niro
- Sorento
- Soul (Discontinued, Not sold in Korea)
- Sportage
- Telluride (Not sold in Korea)
- Seltos
- Ray

==== Kia EV Series ====
- Kia EV2
- Kia EV3
- Kia EV4
- Kia EV5
- Kia EV6
- Kia EV9

==== Pickup ====
- Kia Tasman

==== Commercial vehicles ====
- KB
- Rhino/Wide Boxer
- Trade
- Boxer
- AM Truck
- AM Bus
- Granbird
- Titan
- Super-Titan
- Jumbo-Titan
- Granto
- Combi
- Cosmos
- Pamax
- Frontier
- PV5

=== General Motors Korea ===
==== Chevrolet ====
- Aveo/Sonic (supermini; 5-door hatchback, 4-door sedan; discontinued)
- Bolt (compact electric; imported, discontinued)
- Camaro SS (sports car; imported, discontinued)
- Captiva (mid-size SUV; 5-door wagon; discontinued)
- Colorado (midsize pickup truck; imported)
- Cruze (compact car; 4-door sedan, 5-door hatchback and station wagon; discontinued)
- Equinox (compact crossover; imported, discontinued in Korea)
- Malibu (mid-size car; 4-door sedan; Made in Korea, discontinued)
- Orlando (compact MPV; 5-door wagon; discontinued)
- Spark (city car; 5-door hatchback; Made in Korea, discontinued)
- Tahoe (Full-size SUV; imported, discontinued in Korea)
- Traverse (midsize crossover; imported, discontinued in Korea)
- Trax/Trax Crossover (subcompact SUV; 5-door wagon; Made in Korea)
- Trailblazer (subcompact SUV; 5-door wagon; Made in Korea)

==== Cadillac ====
- XT4 (discontinued in Korea)
- XT5 (discontinued in Korea)
- XT6 (discontinued in Korea)
- Lyriq
- Escalade

==== GMC ====
- Sierra Denali (full-size pickup truck; imported)
- Canyon Denali (mid-size pickup truck; imported)
- Acadia Denali (full-size crossover SUV; imported)
- Hummer EV 2X (full-size electric pickup truck, SUV; imported)

==== Export-only ====
- Buick Encore/Opel Mokka (subcompact SUV; 5-door wagon; export-only; discontinued)
- Buick Encore GX (subcompact SUV; export-only)
- Buick Envista (compact SUV; export-only)

==== Discontinued ====
Buick

- Park Avenue (imported)

Saab

- 9-5 (imported)
- 9-3 (imported)
- 9000 (imported)
- 900 (imported)

Alpheon

- Alpheon

=== KG Mobility ===
SUVs and vans

- Actyon
- Rexton
- Rexton
- Korando/Korando EV
- Rodius/Stavic/Korando Turismo (discontinued)
- Tivoli
- XLV/Tivoli AIR
- Torres/Torres EVX

Pickup trucks

- Musso/Musso Grand
- Actyon Sports (discontinued)
- Musso EV

=== Renault Korea ===
==== Renault ====
- Arkana
- Filante
- QM6 (discontinued)
- Grand Koleos
- SM6 (discontinued)
- Captur (imported; discontinued)
- Clio (imported; discontinued)
- Master (imported; discontinued)
- Twizy (imported; discontinued)
- Zoe (imported; discontinued)

==== Alpine ====
- A110 (imported; limited sales)

=== Tata Daewoo ===
- Novus Series
- Prima Series (2009~2022)
- DEXEN (2020~Present)
- MAXEN (2022~Present)
- KUXEN (2022~Present)
- GIXEN (2025~Present, To commence)

=== KGM Commercial (former Edison Motors) ===
- KGM Commercial SMART
- KGM Commercial C090

==== Discontinued ====
- Hankuk Fiber Primerse
- Edison Fi-bird
- Edison SMART T1.0

=== Woojin ===
- Woojin Apollo 700
- Woojin Apollo 900
- Woojin Apollo 1100
- Woojin Apollo 1200

== Imports ==
Most importers and distributors of foreign automotive marques in the South Korean market are members of the Korea Automobile Importers & Distributors Association (KAIDA). As of 2026, marques represented by the members of KAIDA are the following:

- Audi
- Bentley
- BMW
- BYD
- Cadillac
- Chevrolet (some models were imported)
- Ferrari
- Ford
- GMC
- Honda
- Jeep
- Lamborghini
- Land Rover
- Lexus
- Lincoln
- Mercedes-Benz
- Mini
- Peugeot
- Polestar
- Porsche
- Rolls-Royce
- Tesla
- Toyota
- Volkswagen
- Volvo
- Zeekr

The following commercial vehicle brands are also represented by members of KAIDA in South Korea:

- MAN
- Scania
- Volvo

There are also imported vehicles whose official distributors are not members of KAIDA. As of 2026, the marques are:

- Aston Martin
- Brilliance (commercial vehicles)
- Chery (rebadged as a MASADA model)
- DFSK (compact commercial vehicles)
- Dongfeng (also rebadged by several importers)
- Geely (commercial vehicles)
- Ineos
- Isuzu (commercial vehicles)
- Iveco (commercial vehicles)
- Koenigsegg
- Lotus
- Maserati
- McLaren
- Mercedes-Benz (commercial vehicles)
- Renault (occasionally imported vehicles)

Historically, the following makes were officially represented in South Korea:

- Buick (Park Avenue, 1990-1996)
- Chrysler (1992-2017)
- Citroën
- Dodge (Caliber, Dakota)
- DS (sales until 2023)
- Fiat
- Huansu (sold as Kenbo 600)
- Infiniti (2005-2020)
- Jaguar (sales until 2023)
- Lancia (1996-1997)
- Mercury (Sable was co-branded by Kia from 1989 to 1996)
- Mitsubishi (2008-2013)
- Nissan (2008-2020)
- Saab (1988-2009)
- Subaru (2010-2012)
- Suzuki (1997)

== See also ==
- Automotive industry
- List of automobile manufacturers of South Korea
- Manufacturing in South Korea
