= List of Hyundai vehicles =

The South Korean automobile manufacturer Hyundai Motor Company has produced various cars, SUVs, trucks, and buses since its inception in 1967.

== Passenger vehicles ==
=== Current models ===
Model			Current model				Vehicle description	Global sales (2025, by units)
Image	Name(s)	Introduction (cal. year)	Model code	Introduction	Update (facelift)	Main markets	Vehicle description	Global sales (2025, by units)
Hatchback
	i10	2007	AI3	2019	2023	India and others	City car (A-segment). Discontinued in Europe in January 2026.	170,114
	HB20	2012	BR2	2019	2022	Brazil and Mexico	Subcompact (B-segment) hatchback built for the Brazilian market.	135,908 (incl. sedan)
	i20	2008	BC4	2026	—	Europe, India, Brazil, and others	Subcompact (B-segment) hatchback.	144,237
	Ioniq 3	2026	BJ1	2026	—	Europe and others	Battery electric subcompact (B-segment) hatchback.	-
	i30	2007	PD	2016	2024	Europe, Australia, and others	Compact (C-segment) hatchback.	30,291 (incl. estate)
Sedan/liftback
	Aura / Grand i10 Sedan / Grand Metro	2020	AI3	2020	2023	India and others	Sedan city car (A-segment). Successor of the Xcent. Also called the Grand i10 sedan outside India, and Grand Metro in Colombia.	103,481
	Accent/ Verna	1994	BN7	2023	2026	Asia-Pacific	B-segment/subcompact sedan.	79,491
	HB20S	2012	BR2	2019	2022	Brazil and Mexico	Sedan version of the HB20.	135,908 (incl. hatchback)
	Elantra / Avante / i30 Sedan	1990	CN8	2026	—	Global (except Europe and India)	C-segment/compact sedan. Known as the Avante in South Korea and i30 Sedan in Australia.	364,142
	Sonata	1985	DN8	2020	2023	Global (except Europe, India and select other regions)	D-segment/mid-size sedan.	154,453
	Ioniq 6	2022	CE	2022	2025	Global (except India and select other regions)	Battery electric D-segment/mid-size liftback sedan	19,449
	Ioniq V	2026	EA1c	2026	—	China	Battery electric and range extender D-segment/mid-size sedan.	-
	Grandeur/ Azera	1986	GN7	2022	2026	South Korea and Middle East	E-segment/full-size sedan.	73,347
Station wagon
	i30	2007	PD	2016	2024	Europe	Station wagon version of the i30.	30,291 (incl. hatchback)
SUV/crossover
	Casper	2021	AX1	2021	2024	South Korea	Crossover city car oriented for the South Korean light car segment.	9,750
	Casper Electric / Inster	2024	AX1 EV	2024	—	South Korea, Europe, and others	Battery electric crossover based on the Casper, with longer body.	51,766
	Exter	2023	AI3 CUV	2023	2026	India and the Southern African region	Crossover city car based on the Grand i10.	72,175
	Venue	2019	QU2	2025	—	Global (except Europe, China and Türkiye)	4-meter subcompact crossover SUV (B-segment) smaller than Creta/Kona.	206,460
	Bayon	2021	BC4 CUV	2026	—	Europe, India and select other regions	Subcompact crossover SUV (B-segment) smaller than Kona based on the i20 mainly for the European and Indian markets.	40,782
	Creta/ Cantus	2014	SU2	2019	2024	Emerging markets	4.3-meter subcompact crossover SUV (B-segment) oriented for emerging markets. Known as the Cantus in Dominican Republic.	334,138
	Creta Electric	2025	SU2 EV	2025	—	India	Battery electric subcompact crossover based on the Creta.	8,469
	Kona/ Kauai	2017	SX2	2023	—	Global (except India)	4.3-meter subcompact crossover SUV (B-segment) oriented for developed markets and also available in Türkiye.	258,475
	Kona Electric/ Kauai EV	2018	SX2 EV	2023	—	Global (except India)	Battery electric crossover based on the Kona.	47,133
	Mufasa	2023	NU2	2023	—	China and Taiwan	4.4-meter compact crossover SUV for the Chinese and Taiwanese markets. Successor to the ix35.	12,641
	Alcazar / Grand Creta / Creta Grand / Cantus Lux	2021	SU2 LWB	2021	2025	Global emerging markets	Three-row compact crossover SUV based on the Creta, smaller than Tucson.	24,587
	Elexio/ EO	2025	OE1	2025	—	China and Australia	4.6-meter battery electric compact crossover SUV positioned below the Ioniq 5.	1,254
	Ioniq 5	2021	NE	2021	2024	Global	4.6-meter battery electric compact crossover SUV.	97,778
	Nexo	2018	NH2	2025	—	South Korea, Europe, United States	Fuel cell compact crossover SUV.	5,708
	Tucson	2004	NX5	2026	—	Global (except India)	4.7-meter compact crossover SUV. Best-selling Hyundai model in 2021.	639,432
	Tucson	2004	NX4	2020	2025	Global (except India)	4.7-meter compact crossover SUV. Best-selling Hyundai model in 2021.	–
	Santa Fe	2000	MX5	2023	—	Global (except India)	4.8-meter two or three-row mid-size crossover SUV.	251,236
	Palisade	2018	LX3	2025	—	Global (except Europe, India and some other regions)	5-meter three-row mid-size crossover SUV larger than the Santa Fe.	211,215
	Ioniq 9	2025	ME	2025	—	Global (except India and select other regions)	Battery electric 5-meter mid-size crossover SUV.	27,141
Pickup truck
	Santa Cruz	2021	NX4a OB	2021	2025	U.S. and Canada	Compact pickup based on the Tucson.	30,283
MPV/minivan
	Neira	2026	KY	2026	–	Indonesia	Battery electric compact MPV with three-row seating, rebadged Kia Carens.	-
	Stargazer	2022	KS	2022	2025	Southeast Asia and Middle East	Compact MPV with three-row seating.	16,679
	Custo/ Custin	2021	KU	2021	—	China, Taiwan, Philippines and Vietnam	Minivan for the Chinese and Taiwanese market with three-row seating.	21,412
	Staria	2021	US4	2021	2025	Global (except North America and India)	Full-size minivan. Available with three-row and four-row seating. Battery electric version available.	N/A

=== Former models ===
Model	Timeline		Successor
Model	Introduced	Discontinued	Successor
Cortina	1968	1983	Stellar
20M	1969	1973	Granada
Pony	1975	1990	Excel; Elantra
Granada	1978	1985	Grandeur
Stellar	1983	1992	Sonata; Elantra
Excel/Presto	1985	2000	Accent
Grace/H100/Satellite	1987	1996	Starex
Scoupe	1988	1995	Tiburon
Galloper	1991	2004	Terracan
Marcia	1995	1998	Sonata
Tiburon/Coupe/Tuscani	1996	2008	Veloster
Dynasty	1996	2005	Aslan
Santamo	1996	2003	Trajet
Atos/Santro	1997	2014	i10 Eon
Starex	1997	2021	Staria
Trajet	1999	2008	
Equus/Centennial	1999	2016	Genesis G90
Libero/H-1	2000	2007	Porter
Lavita/Matrix	2001	2010	ix20
Terracan	2001	2011	Veracruz
Getz/Click	2002	2011	i20 Accent WIT
Veracruz/ix55	2006	2012	Maxcruz
Entourage	2007	2009	Kia Carnival
Genesis	2007	2016	Genesis G80
Genesis Coupe	2008	2016	
ix20	2010	2019	
ix35 (China)	2010	2023	Mufasa
Veloster	2011	2022	
Eon	2011	2019	Santro (AH2)
i40	2011	2019	Sonata
Mistra	2013	2023	Sonata
ix35 FCEV	2013	2018	Nexo
Maxcruz/Santa Fe XL	2013	2019	Palisade
Xcent	2014	2020	Aura
ix25	2014	2021	
Aslan	2014	2017	
i20 Active	2015	2020	Bayon
Ioniq	2016	2022	Elantra Hybrid
Reina/Verna	2017	2021	Lafesta
Celesta	2017	2023	
Santro (AH2)	2018	2022	Grand i10 NIOS
Lafesta	2018	2025	Elantra
Encino	2018	2020	

== Commercial vehicles ==
=== Current models ===
Model			Current model			Vehicle description
Image	Name(s)	Introduction (cal. year)	Introduction	Update (facelift)	Main markets	Vehicle description
Van
	Staria	2021	2021	2026	Asia, Europe, Australasia and others	Mid-size panel van. Available with one or two-row seating. Battery electric version available
	H350/Solati	2014	2014	2017	Asia, Europe and others	Large van. Available as a minibus
Light pickup truck
	ST1	2024	2024	—	South Korea and Europe	Battery electric front-wheel drive cab chassis. Also rebadged as Iveco eMoovy
	Porter/H-100	1977	2004	Incremental yearly updates	Asia	Light commercial truck. EV version comes standard in Korea.
Heavy truck
	HT/Hongtu/Zedo	2019	2019	—	China	Light-duty truck.
	Mighty	1977	2015	2026	South Korea, China, Middle East, Australia, Latin America, Europe, Africa	Light-duty truck.
	Pavise	2019	2019	2026	South Korea, Australia, Latin America	Medium-duty truck.
	New Power Truck	2004	2011	—	South Korea, Asia, Africa, Latin America	Heavy-duty truck.
	Xcient	2013	2013	2025	South Korea, Asia, Western Europe	Heavy-duty truck. Fuel cell version available
Buses
	County	1998	1998	2020	South Korea, China, Middle East, Southeast Asia, Africa	Single-decker minibus.
	Aero City	1991	2017	—	South Korea, Asia, Middle East, Western Europe	Single-decker transit bus.
	Elec City	2017	2017	—	South Korea, China, Western Europe, USA	Battery electric or fuel-cell hydrogen bus. Available in double-decker version.
	Universe	2006	2019	—	South Korea, China, Southeast Asia, Middle East	Single-decker luxury coach.

=== Former models ===
Model	Timeline		Successor
Model	Introduced	Discontinued	Successor
D series	1969	1978	Bison
R series	1969	1977	
O302	1972	1975	O303
DK series	1972	1975	
DQ-7	1973	1981	Chorus; Aero Town
HD series	1975	1982	FB series
O303	1976	1977	
Bison	1977	1981	Mighty
8 to 25-ton truck	1977	2021	Super Truck
RB series	1977	1991	Aero City; Aero
FB series	1983	1992	
Aero	1985	2006	Universe
Aero Space	1985	2006	
Chorus	1988	1998	County
4.5 to 5-ton truck	1994	1997	Super Truck Medium
Aero Town	1994	2024	
Starex/H-1/i-Load	1997	2023	Staria
Super Truck	1997	2004	New Power Truck
Trago	1997	2013	Xcient
Super Truck Medium	1999	2004	Mega Truck
Mega Truck	2004	2021	Pavise
Green City	2010	2024	Elec City Town
Blue City	2011	2019	
Ruiyue/Chido	2014	2019	Hongtu

== See also ==
- List of Hyundai engines
- List of Hyundai transmissions
- List of Kia vehicles
- List of Genesis vehicles
- Hyundai Motor Company
- Genesis Motor
