= Kaida =

Kaida may refer to:

- Kaida (surname), a Japanese surname
- Kaida, Nagano, a former village in Kiso District, Nagano Prefecture, Japan
- Kaida Station, a railway station in Kunimi, Fukushima Prefecture, Japan
- Korea Automobile Importers & Distributors Association, a South Korean trade association
