= List of Korean car makers =

List of Korean car makers may refer to:

- Automotive industry in North Korea
- Automotive industry in South Korea
- List of automobile manufacturers of South Korea
