= Hyundai 4.5 to 5-ton truck =

Overview
- Manufacturer: Hyundai Motor Company; Mitsubishi Motors
- Production: Worldwide
- Designer: Mitsubishi Fuso

Body and chassis
- Class: Rear wheel drive vehicles
- Body style: Truck
- Platform: Mitsubishi Fuso Fighter

Powertrain
- Transmission: Hyundai/Mitsubishi (manual), ZF (automatic)

Chronology
- Successor: Hyundai Super Truck Medium

The Hyundai 4.5 to 5-ton truck (hangul:현대4.5톤・5톤트럭) is a line of medium-duty commercial vehicles by Hyundai Motor Company. The range was primarily available in cargo and dump truck. Its model truck name is 'Hyundai' and 'Hyundai Mitsubishi Fuso'.

Most medium-duty truck models are distinguishable by a front 'Hyundai Truck' badge, but the common Hyundai, and Mitsubishi Fuso badge is usually used on the rear.

In Japan, Asia-Pacific, Mid-East, Africa, South America, its principal competitors are Kia Rhino.

== Models ==
Hyundai 4.5ton & 5ton Truck is a name used by Hyundai Motor Company in commercial vehicle of trucks for two related models.

- Hyundai 4.5 to 5-ton Truck: a cargo truck (flatbed truck/box truck) & dump truck, Designed by Mitsubishi Fuso Truck and Bus Corporation. Manufacture period: 1990–1995. Rebadged by Mitsubishi Fuso Fighter.
- Hyundai 4.5 to 5-ton Truck New Model: a cargo truck & dump truck, Designed by Hyundai Motor Company and Mitsubishi Fuso Truck and Bus Corporation. Manufacture period: 1994–1997.
  - 4.5 ton Cargo
  - 4.5 ton Dump
  - 5 ton Cargo
  - 5 ton Dump

== See also ==
- Hyundai Motor Company
- Mitsubishi Fuso Truck and Bus Corporation
- Hyundai Super Truck Medium
- Hyundai Mega Truck
