= List of automobile manufacturers of South Korea =

This is a list of current and defunct automobile manufacturers of South Korea.

== Current manufacturers ==
Company	Sub brand	Parent company
Hyundai Motor Company (1967–present)	Genesis (2015–present)	
Hyundai Motor Company (1967–present)	Hyundai N (2016-present)	
Hyundai Motor Company (1967–present)	Ioniq (2020–present)	
KG Mobility (1954–present)	Musso (2025–present)	KG Group
KGM Commercial (1997–present)		KG Group
Kia (1944–present)		
Woojin Industrial Systems (2017–present)		

=== Foreign manufacturers building in South Korea ===
Company	Parent company
GM Korea (2002–present)	General Motors
Renault Korea (1994–present)	Renault
Tata Daewoo (2002–present)	Tata Motors

== Former manufacturers ==
- Asia Motors (1965–1999) (Merged into Kia Motors)
- Daewoo Motors (1972–2011) (Replaced by GM Korea)
- Keohwa (1974–1984) (Acquired by SsangYong Motor, now KG Mobility)
- Proto Motors (1997–2017)
- Saehan Motors (1976–1983) (Acquired by Daewoo Motors)
- Shinjin Motors (1955–1984) (Acquired by SsangYong Motor, now KG Mobility)
- Sibal (1955–1963)

== See also ==
- List of automobile manufacturers of Japan
- List of automobile manufacturers of China
