= Hyundai 8 to 25-ton truck =

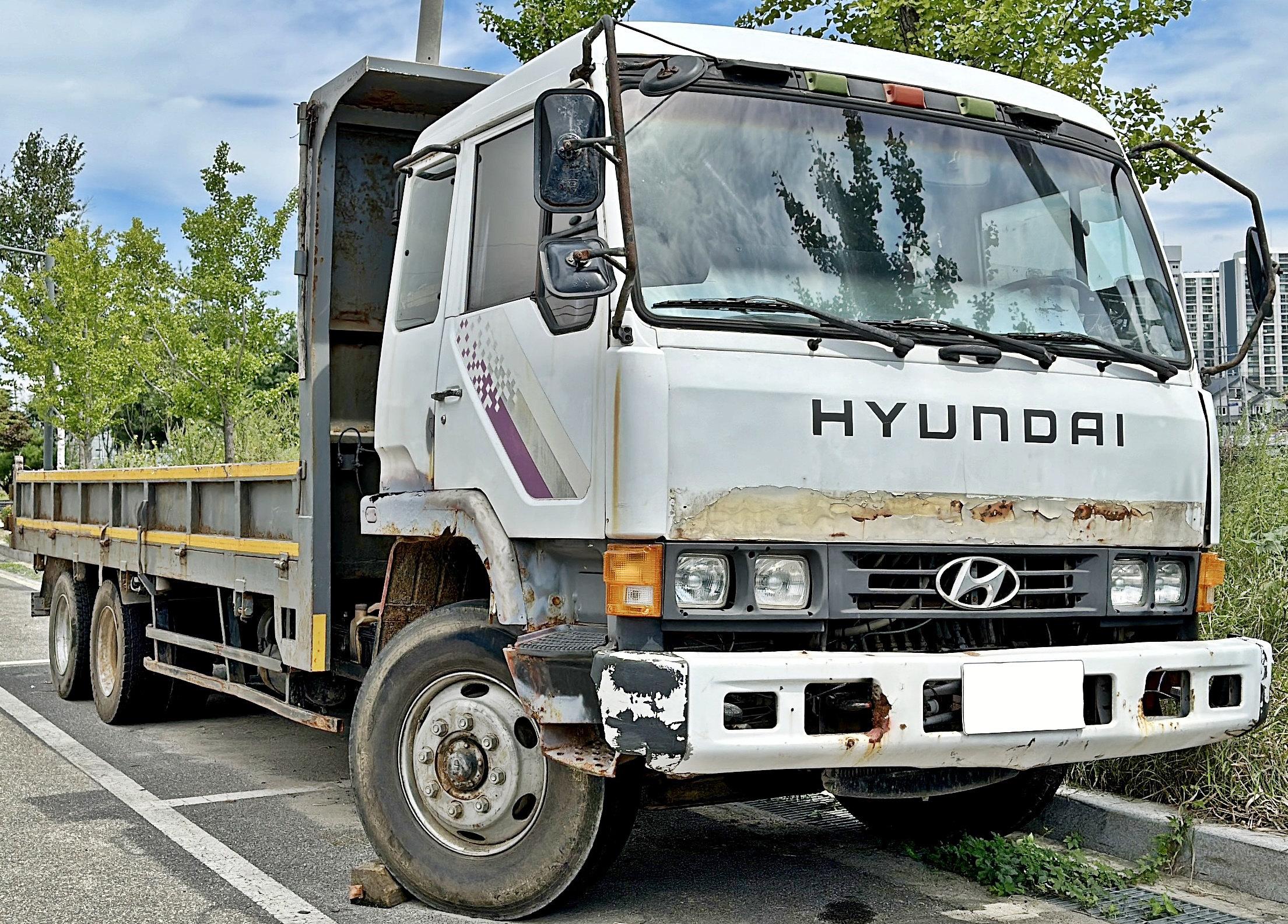
- 1994-97 Hyundai Heavy Truck

Overview
- Manufacturer: Hyundai Motor Company; Mitsubishi Motors
- Also called: Bering HDMX (North America)
- Production: Worldwide
- Model years: 1977 - 2021
- Designer: Mitsubishi Fuso

Body and chassis
- Class: Heavy Duty vehicles
- Body style: Truck
- Platform: Mitsubishi Fuso The Great
- Doors: 2
- Related: Hyundai 4.5 Ton - 5.5 Ton

Powertrain
- Engine: MAN D0846HM, D8AY, D8AA, Hyundai Powertec Series
- Transmission: Hyundai/Mitsubishi (manual), ZF (automatic)

Chronology
- Successor: Hyundai Super Truck

The Hyundai 8 to 25-ton truck (hangul:현대트럭) is a line of heavy-duty commercial vehicles by Hyundai Motor Company. The range was primarily available as cargo and dump truck. Its model truck name is 'Hyundai' and 'Hyundai Mitsubishi Fuso'.

Most heavy-duty truck models are distinguishable by a front 'Hyundai Truck' badge, but the common Hyundai and Mitsubishi Fuso badge is usually used on the rear.

== Models ==
Hyundai Truck (8ton~25ton Truck) is a name used by Hyundai Motor Company in commercial vehicle of trucks for two related models.

First Generation

- Hyundai Truck: a cargo truck & dump truck, designed by Mitsubishi Fuso Truck and Bus Corporation. Manufacture period: 1977–1997. Hyundai rebadged the Mitsubishi F-series and the Mitsubishi Fuso The Great.
  - 8 ton Cargo
  - 11 ton Cargo
  - 9.5 ton Cargo (launched in 1988)
  - 18 ton Cargo (launched in 1992)
  - 8 ton Dump
  - 15 ton Dump
  - 23 ton Dump (launched in 1992)
  - 25 ton
  - Mixer
  - Tractor
- Second Generation. Hyundai Truck New Model: a cargo truck & dump truck, Designed by Hyundai Motor Company and Mitsubishi Fuso Truck and Bus Corporation. Manufacture period: 1997–2003.
  - 8 ton Cargo
  - 8.5 ton Cargo
  - 9.5 ton cargo
  - 11 ton Cargo
  - 11.5 ton Cargo
  - 12 ton Cargo
  - 13 ton Cargo
  - 14 ton Cargo
  - 15 ton Cargo
  - 16 ton cargo
  - 17 ton Cargo
  - 18 ton Cargo
  - 19 ton Cargo
  - 19.5 ton Cargo
  - 22 ton cargo
  - 22.5 ton Cargo
  - 23 ton Cargo
  - 23.5 ton Cargo
  - 25 ton Cargo
  - 8 ton Dump
  - 11 ton Dump
  - 15 ton Dump
  - 23 ton Dump
  - 24 ton Dump
  - 6x2 Mixer
  - 8x4 Mixer
  - 6x2 Tractor
  - 6x4 Tractor

Third Generation

- 8 ton Cargo
- 8.5 ton Cargo
- 9.5 ton cargo
- 11 ton Cargo
- 11.5 ton Cargo
- 12 ton Cargo
- 13 ton Cargo
- 14 ton Cargo
- 15 ton Cargo
- 16 ton cargo
- 17 ton Cargo
- 18 ton Cargo
- 19 ton Cargo
- 19.5 ton Cargo
- 22 ton cargo
- 22.5 ton Cargo
- 23 ton Cargo
- 23.5 ton Cargo
- 25 ton Cargo
- 8 ton Dump
- 11 ton Dump
- 15 ton Dump
- 23 ton Dump
- 24 ton Dump
- 6x2 Mixer
- 8x4 Mixer
- 6x2 Tractor
- 6x4 Tractor

== See also ==
- Hyundai Motor Company
- Mitsubishi Fuso Truck and Bus Corporation
- Hyundai Super Truck
- Hyundai New Power Truck
