= Keohwa =

Former South Korean Jeep assembler

Keohwa, Ltd. (Korean: 주식회사 거화; RR: Jusighoesa Geohwa) was a Seoul, South Korea, based assembler of Jeeps under licence, mainly for export markets. Its predecessor was the Jeep assembly joint venture of Shinjin Motors and American Motors Corporation (AMC), established in 1974. It was spun off as an independent company in 1981, after AMC left the venture and retired the permission to use the Jeep trade mark. In 1983, Jeeps from Keohwa started to use the Korando nameplate. In 1984, Keohwa was acquired by Dong-A Motor, the predecessor of Ssangyong Motor.

== Models ==
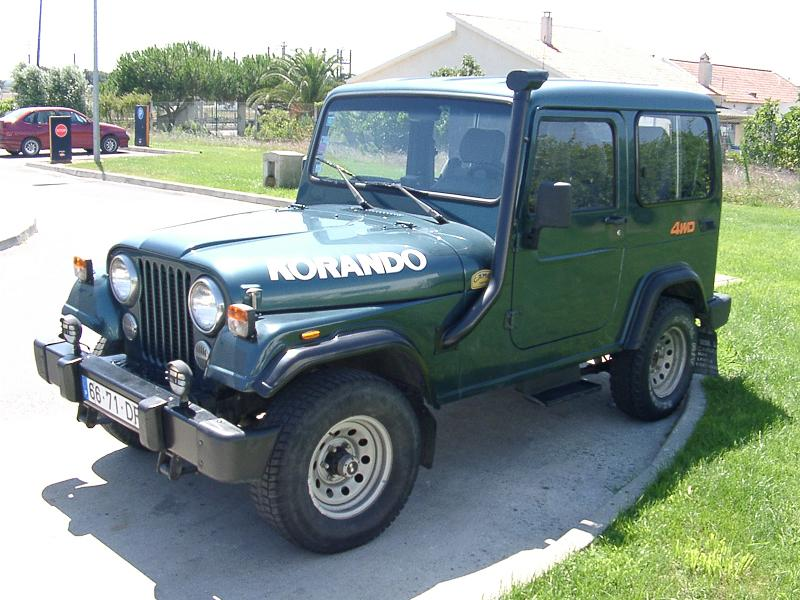
Keohwa Korando.

Unlike Kia, who also produced Jeep vehicles, Keowha produced exact copies, plus its own variants of the following:

- CJ 5 & 6, later as the Korando

== See also ==
- Asia Motors, another South Korean jeep manufacturer
- List of Korean car makers
