= Kaida (surname) =

Kaida (written: 海田 or 甲斐田) is a Japanese surname. Notable people with the surname include:

- Akari Kaida (海田 明里, born 1974), Japanese video game composer
- Yuki Kaida (甲斐田 ゆき), Japanese voice actress
- Yūko Kaida (甲斐田 裕子, born 1980), Japanese voice actress
