= Hyundai e-Mighty =

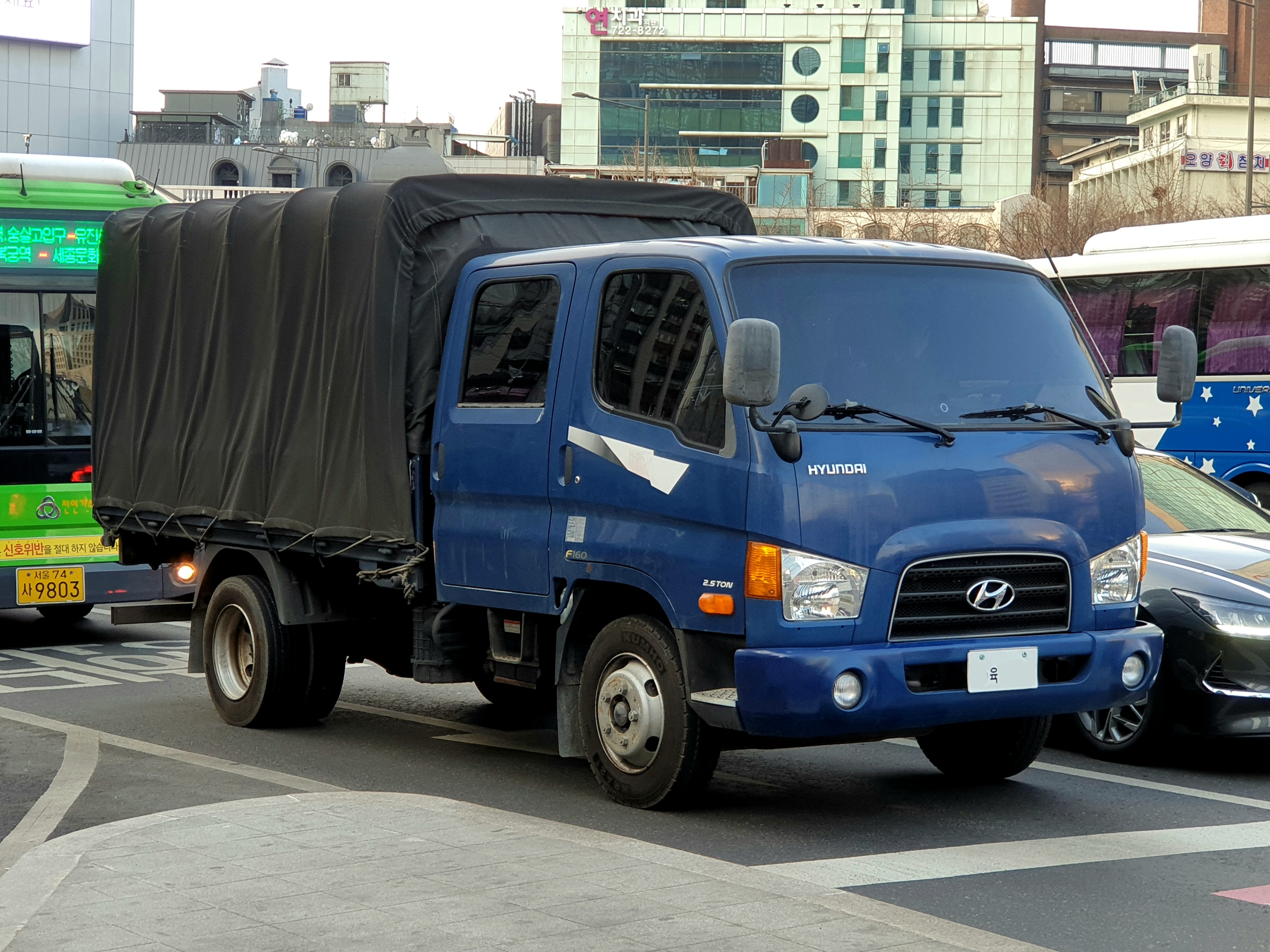

Overview
- Manufacturer: Hyundai Motor Company
- Also called: Hyundai New Mighty (Africa and Latin America); Hyundai Mighty EX Series (Note: Available in three models (EX5, EX6, EX8).)
- Production: 2004-present
- Assembly: Jeonju, South Korea (Hyundai Motors Jeonju)
- Designer: Hyundai Motor Company Design Center

Body and chassis
- Class: Truck (Rear wheel drive vehicles)
- Body style: Truck (standard cab, crew cab)
- Related: Bering MS

Powertrain
- Engine: Hyundai 145ps CRDi Engine
- Transmission: Hyundai (manual); Allison (automatic)

Chronology
- Predecessor: Hyundai Mighty II
- Successor: Hyundai New Mighty

The Hyundai e-Mighty (hangul:현대 이 마이티, 현대 e-마이티) is a line of light-duty commercial vehicles by Hyundai Motor Company. The range was primarily available in Korea and some other Asian countries. e-Mighty was first manufactured in October 2004 with the first cars going to Korea. Manufacturing began in 2004 with Hyundai in Korea and Asia. Other areas which imported or manufactured the e-Mighty included Europe, the Mid-east and North America. In many markets the e-Mighty was very expensive and was replaced by the Hyundai Truck when that model became available for worldwide markets in early 2004.

The overseas market was also important for the e-Mighty - to the extent that it was manufactured there from the 2000s using many local components.

Most models of the truck are distinguishable by a front 'e-Mighty' badge, but the common Hyundai badge is usually used on the rear. Japanese and Asian competitors are the Mitsubishi Fuso Canter, Isuzu Elf, UD Atlas, Toyota Dyna, and Hino Dutro.

== Models ==
=== Model name (South Korea) ===
- Gold
- Super
- Deluxe
- HD78

=== Lineup ===
- Standard Cab Low Long Cargo (2.5t)
- Standard Cab Shot Cargo (2.5t, 3.5t Chassis Cab)
- Standard Cab Long Cargo (2.5t, 3.5t)
- Double Crew Cab Long Cargo (2.5t)
- Standard Cab Shot Dump (2.5t, 3.5t)
