= Hyundai Mighty II =

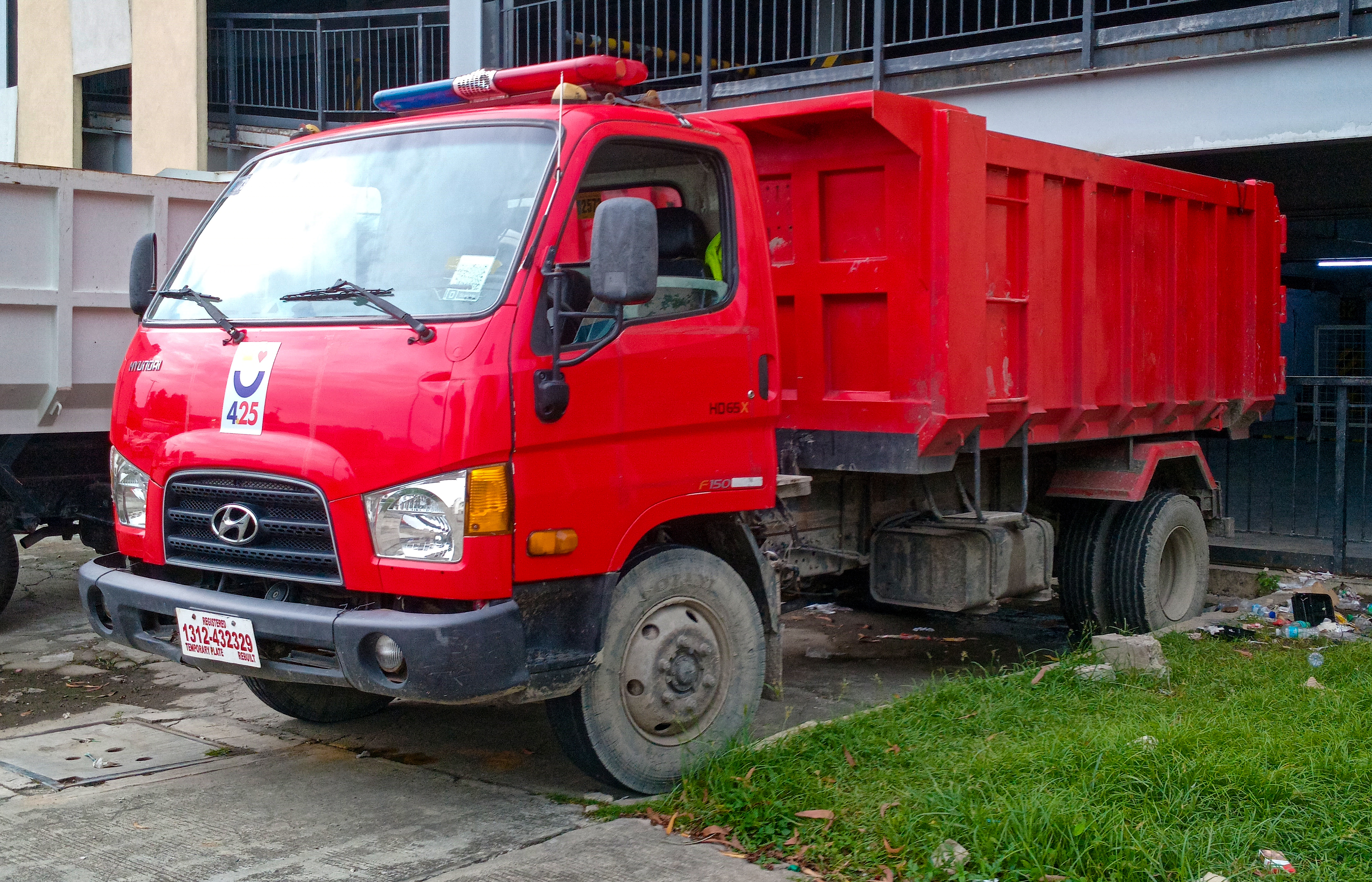

Overview
- Manufacturer: Hyundai Motor Company
- Also called: Bering LD (North America); Kia Pamax; Hyundai Mighty HD Series (Note: Available in six models (HD35, HD45, HD55S, HD65, HD72, HD78).)
- Production: 1997–2004
- Assembly: Jeonju, South Korea (Hyundai Motors Jeonju)
- Designer: Hyundai Motor Company Design Center

Body and chassis
- Class: Truck (Rear wheel drive vehicles)
- Body style: Truck (standard cab, crew cab)

Powertrain
- Transmission: Hyundai (manual); Allison (automatic)

Chronology
- Predecessor: Hyundai Mighty
- Successor: Hyundai e-Mighty

The Hyundai Mighty II (hangul:현대 마이티 투, 현대 마이티 II) is a line of medium-duty commercial vehicles built by Hyundai Motor Company. The range was primarily available in Korea and some other Asian countries, although it was also sold in the United States. The Mighty II was manufactured beginning in August 1997 with the first cars going to Korea. Other regions for which the Mighty II was imported or manufactured included Europe, the Middle East, and North America. In many markets the Mighty II was very expensive and was replaced by the Hyundai Truck when that model became available. Production of the Mighty II ended in 2004.

The overseas was another important market for the Mighty II - to the extent that it was manufactured there from the 1990s using many local components.

Most models of the truck are distinguishable by a front 'Mighty II' and 'Mighty II HSV' badge, but the common Hyundai badge is usually used on the rear.

In United States, it was also sold as the Bering LD.

== Models ==
=== Current models ===
Current models for sale include the HD65, HD72 and the HD78. The digits give the maximum gross vehicle weight rating (GVWR) in hundreds of kilograms, so the HD65 has a GVWR of 6,500 kilograms (14,300 lb), for instance. There is a choice of four cabs (Narrow, Standard/Wide, Super and Double Cab) and two wheelbases (Short and Long Wheelbase), but not all combinations are available for each model.

Model	Cab	Wheelbase	Track F/R	Width (overall)	Wheelbase	Length (overall)	Height (overall)
HD65	Narrow	Short	F:1,475 mm (58.1 in); R:1,435 mm (56.5 in)	1,760 mm (69 in)	2,550 mm (100 in)	4,885 mm (192.3 in)	2,195 mm (86.4 in)
HD65	Narrow	Long	F:1,475 mm (58.1 in); R:1,435 mm (56.5 in)	1,760 mm (69 in)	3,375 mm (132.9 in)	5,925 mm (233.3 in)	2,195 mm (86.4 in)
HD65	Standard (Wide)	Short	F:1,665 mm (65.6 in); R:1,495 mm (58.9 in)	2,000 mm (79 in)	2,750 mm (108 in)	5,165 mm (203.3 in)	2,195 mm (86.4 in)
HD65	Standard (Wide)	Long	F:1,665 mm (65.6 in); R:1,495 mm (58.9 in)	2,000 mm (79 in)	3,375 mm (132.9 in)	5,970 mm (235 in)	2,195 mm (86.4 in)
HD65	Super	Long	F:1,665 mm (65.6 in); R:1,495 mm (58.9 in)	2,000 mm (79 in)	3,570 mm (141 in)	6,270 mm (247 in)	2,195 mm (86.4 in)
HD65	Double	Long	F:1,665 mm (65.6 in); R:1,495 mm (58.9 in)	2,000 mm (79 in)	3,375 mm (132.9 in)	5,970 mm (235 in)	2,195 mm (86.4 in)
HD72	Standard (Wide)	Short	F:1,650 mm (65 in); R:1,495 mm (58.9 in)	2,000 mm (79 in)	2,750 mm (108 in)	5,120 mm (202 in)	2,265 mm (89.2 in)
HD72	Standard (Wide)	Long	F:1,650 mm (65 in); R:1,495 mm (58.9 in)	2,000 mm (79 in)	3,735 mm (147.0 in)	6,624 mm (260.8 in)	2,265 mm (89.2 in)
HD72	Super	Long	F:1,650 mm (65 in); R:1,495 mm (58.9 in)	2,000 mm (79 in)	3,735 mm (147.0 in)	6,624 mm (260.8 in)	2,265 mm (89.2 in)
HD78	Standard (Wide)	Short	F:1,667 mm (65.6 in); R:1,495 mm (58.9 in)	2,000 mm (79 in)	2,780 mm (109 in)	5,195 mm (204.5 in)	2,270 mm (89 in)
HD78	Standard (Wide)	Long	F:1,667 mm (65.6 in); R:1,495 mm (58.9 in)	2,000 mm (79 in)	3,735 mm (147.0 in)	6,624 mm (260.8 in)	2,270 mm (89 in)
HD78	Super	Long	F:1,667 mm (65.6 in); R:1,495 mm (58.9 in)	2,000 mm (79 in)	3,735 mm (147.0 in)	6,624 mm (260.8 in)	2,270 mm (89 in)

There are a choice of six engines available, all four-cylinder diesels from the Hyundai's D4 engine family.

Model	Emissions	Aspiration	Displacement (Bore × Stroke)	Power	Torque	HD65 Narrow	HD65 Wide	HD72	HD78
D4AF	General	Natural	3,568 cm^{3} (217.7 cu in); 104 mm × 105 mm (4.1 in × 4.1 in)	100 PS (74 kW) @3,400 RPM	24 kg⋅m (235 N⋅m; 174 lbf⋅ft) @2,000 RPM	Yes Yes	Yes Yes	No No	No No
D4AL	Euro I	Turbocharged; intercooled	3,298 cm^{3} (201.3 cu in); 100 mm × 105 mm (3.9 in × 4.1 in)	115 PS (85 kW) @3,400 RPM	29 kg⋅m (284 N⋅m; 210 lbf⋅ft) @2,000 RPM	Yes Yes	Yes Yes	Yes Yes	No No
D4DB	Euro II	Turbocharged; intercooled	3,907 cm^{3} (238.4 cu in); 104 mm × 115 mm (4.1 in × 4.5 in)	130 PS (96 kW) @2,900 RPM	38 kg⋅m (373 N⋅m; 275 lbf⋅ft) @1,600 RPM	No No	Yes Yes	Yes Yes	Yes Yes
D4DB-d	Euro II	Turbocharged; intercooled	3,907 cm^{3} (238.4 cu in); 104 mm × 115 mm (4.1 in × 4.5 in)	120 PS (88 kW) @2,900 RPM	30 kg⋅m (294 N⋅m; 217 lbf⋅ft) @2,000 RPM	Yes Yes	Yes Yes	Yes Yes	No No
D4DC	Euro I	Natural	3,907 cm^{3} (238.4 cu in); 104 mm × 115 mm (4.1 in × 4.5 in)	120 PS (88 kW) @3,200 RPM	30 kg⋅m (294 N⋅m; 217 lbf⋅ft) @2,000 RPM	No No	Yes Yes	Yes Yes	Yes Yes
D4DD	Euro III	Turbocharged; intercooled	3,907 cm^{3} (238.4 cu in); 104 mm × 115 mm (4.1 in × 4.5 in)	140 PS (103 kW) @2,800 RPM	38 kg⋅m (373 N⋅m; 275 lbf⋅ft) @1,600 RPM	No No	Yes Yes	No No	Yes Yes

=== Model name (South Korea) ===
Wide Cab

- Gold
- Super
- Deluxe

Narrow Cab QT

- Super
- Hi-Super
- HD78

=== Ton type ===
Wide Cab

- 2.5t, 3.5t

Narrow Cab QT

- 3.5t, 5.2t

=== Lineup ===
Other special vehicle models in Hyundai commercial vehicles

- Standard Cab Low Long Cargo (2.5t, 2t QT, 2.5t QT)
- Standard Cab Shot Cargo (2.5t, 2t QT, 2,5t QT)
- Standard Cab Long Cargo (2.5t, 3.5t, 2t QT, 2.5t QT)
- Double Crew Cab Long Cargo (2.5t)
- Standard Cab Shot Dump (2.5t, 3.5t, 2t QT, 2.5t QT)
