= Korea Automobile Importers & Distributors Association =

- Abbreviation: KAIDA
- Formation: 1995; 31 years ago
- Type: Trade association
- Region served: South Korea
- Website: www.kaida.co.kr

The Korea Automobile Importers & Distributors Association (Korean: 한국수입자동차협회), or KAIDA, is a South Korean trade association representing importers and distributors of imported automobiles, established in 1995. It is a corporation registered under the Ministry of Commerce, Industry and Energy, whose membership consists of thirteen importers and distributors of foreign automotive marques in the South Korean market.

KAIDA lobbies in support of its members for government deregulation of the South Korean import auto market, and also helps manage and coordinate joint events for sales promotions and other activities for automobile importers and distributors.

== History ==
- 1994: General Assembly establishes KAIDA
- 1995:
  - KAIDA is licensed as a Corporation by the Ministry of Commerce, Industry and Energy
  - Inauguration of Sang-Do Kang, 1st Chairman of KAIDA
- 1997:
  - Vote for full-time working structure at the Regular General Assembly (Opening of full-time working organizations and corporate offices of KAIDA)
  - Inauguration of Byung-Gun Choi, 2nd Chairman of KAIDA
  - Press meeting on 10th anniversary of the automobile imports and open markets
  - Joint press conference with AAMA, ACEA and KAIDA
- 1998: Joint marketing campaigns in opposition to protests against imported automobiles
- 1999: KAIDA website opens
- 2000:
  - 1st survey of Consumer Attitude Towards Import Cars In Korea
  - Inauguration of Eul-Rae Son, 3rd Chairman of KAIDA
  - Guide Book for Imported Automobiles published
  - KAIDA hosts "2000 Korea Import Motor Show"
- 2001: 2nd survey of Consumer Attitude Towards Import Cars In Korea
- 2002:
  - Inauguration of Eul-Rae Son, 4th Chairman of KAIDA
  - 3rd survey of Consumer Attitude Towards Import Cars In Korea
  - Influence of imported automobiles elucidated by the KIEP & Economy Strategy Institute on Domestic Automobile Industry
  - Internet data programs on the registration and statistics of imported automobiles
- 2003:
  - 4th survey of Consumer Attitude Towards Import Cars In Korea
  - Guide Book for Imported Automobiles published
  - KAIDA hosts "2003 Korea Import Motor Show"
- 2004:
  - 5th survey of Consumer Attitude Towards Import Cars In Korea
  - Inauguration of Seung-Chul Song, 5th Chairman of KAIDA
- 2005:
  - 6th survey of Consumer Attitude Towards Import Cars In Korea
  - Guide Book for Imported Automobiles published
  - KAIDA co-hosts "2005 Seoul Motor Show"
- 2017:
  - Started compiling statistics on new imported commercial vehicle registrations

== Corporate members of KAIDA ==
=== Passenger vehicle importers and distributors ===
- Audi Volkswagen Korea Ltd. (Audi, Bentley, Lamborghini, Volkswagen)
- BMW Group Korea (BMW, MINI, Rolls-Royce)
- BYD Korea (BYD)
- Cadillac Korea (Cadillac)
- Ford Sales & Service Korea (Ford, Lincoln)
- Forza Motors Korea (Ferrari)
- GM Korea (Chevrolet, GMC)
- Honda Korea (Honda)
- Jaguar Land Rover Korea (Land Rover)
- Mercedes-Benz Korea (Mercedes-Benz)
- Polestar Korea (Polestar)
- Porsche Korea (Porsche)
- Stellantis Korea (Jeep, Peugeot)
- Tesla Korea (Tesla)
- Toyota Motor Korea (Lexus, Toyota)
- Volvo Car Korea (Volvo)
- Zeekr Korea (Zeekr)

=== Commercial vehicle importers and distributors ===
- MAN Truck & Bus Korea (MAN)
- Scania Korea Seoul (Scania)
- Volvo Trucks Korea (Volvo)

== See also ==
- Automotive industry in South Korea
- Economy of South Korea
