= KGM Musso EV =

Electric mid-size pickup truck

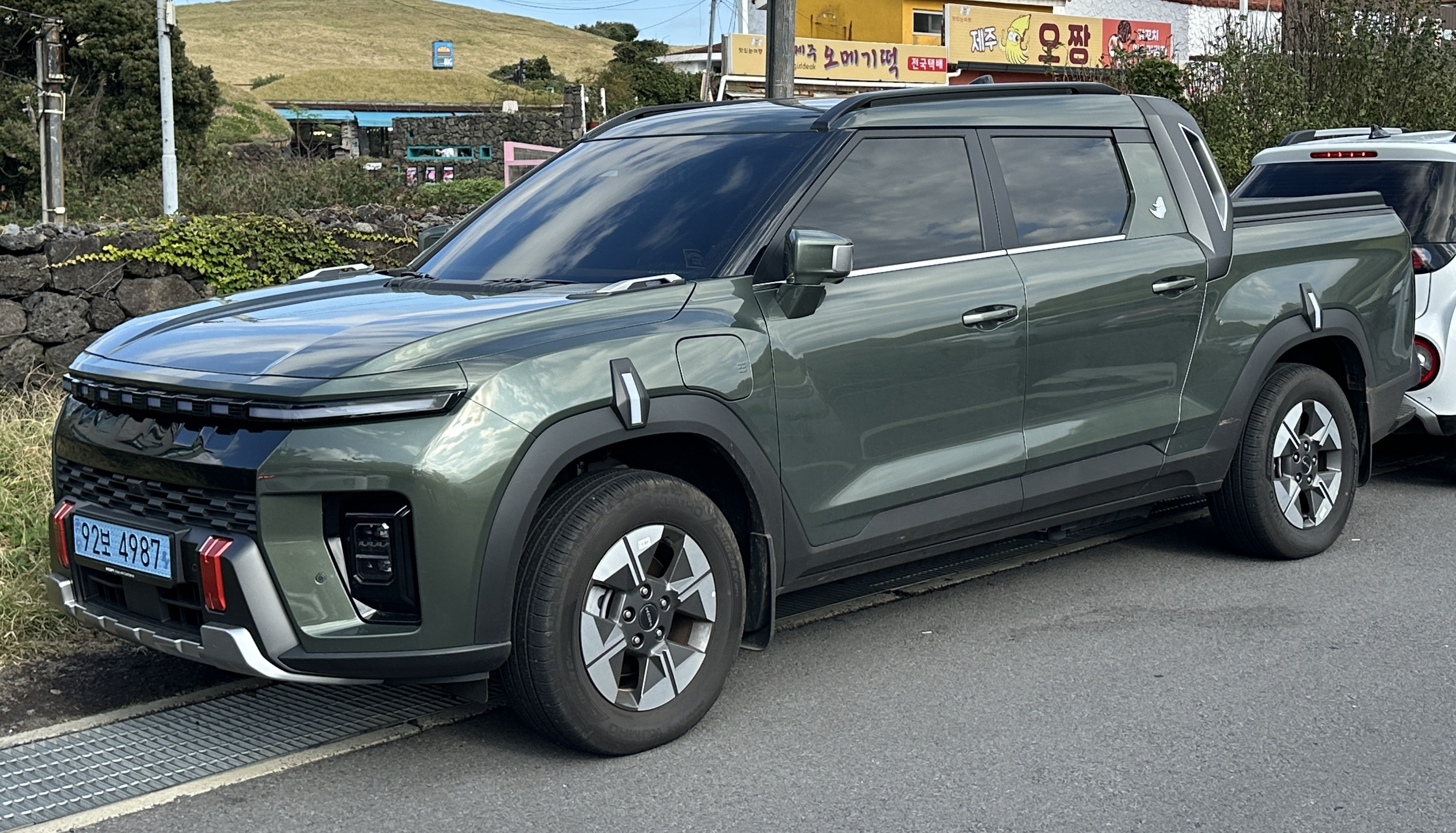

Overview
- Manufacturer: KGM
- Model code: O100
- Production: 2025–present
- Assembly: South Korea: Pyeongtaek, Gyeonggi

Body and chassis
- Class: Mid-size pickup truck
- Layout: Front-motor, front-wheel-drive; Dual-motor, all-wheel-drive

Powertrain
- Power output: 152 kW (204 hp) (FWD); 266 kW (357 hp) (AWD)
- Battery: 80.6 kWh
- Range: 420 kilometres (261 mi) (FWD) (WLTP); 380 kilometres (236 mi) (AWD) (WLTP)

Dimensions
- Wheelbase: 3,150 mm (124.0 in)
- Length: 5,160 mm (203.1 in)
- Width: 1,920 mm (75.6 in)
- Height: 1,740 mm (68.5 in)

The KGM Musso EV (Korean: KGM 무쏘 EV) is a battery electric mid-size pickup truck produced by South Korean manufacturer KG Mobility. Launched in March 2025, it is the first electric pickup from a South Korean manufacturer.

== Overview ==
The Musso EV was previewed as the KGM O100 concept on 30 March 2023 at the 2023 Seoul Motor Show a large number of concepts and production models.

Musso is the same name as the SUV model Musso and the pickup model Musso Sports. It is also the first model of the integrated pickup brand Musso that KGM released in January 2025.

The Musso EV is an urban electric pickup truck. The exterior design is based on the Handy and Tough concept with the deck and body being integrated.

On March 5, 2025, KGM held a new car launch event at its headquarters in Pyeongtaek, Gyeonggi Province and officially launched the Musso EV. It is equipped with an 80.6 kWh lithium iron phosphate (LFP) blade battery and has a V2L function. The maximum load capacity of the deck is 500 kg (1,102 lb), and it is equipped with a deck top, roll bar, and deck sliding cover. The second-row seats are equipped with sliding and reclining functions.

On November 18 2025, KGM announced the Musso EV to Australia is to be on sale in December. With dual-motor, all-wheel-drive and two front-engine, front-wheel drive variants.

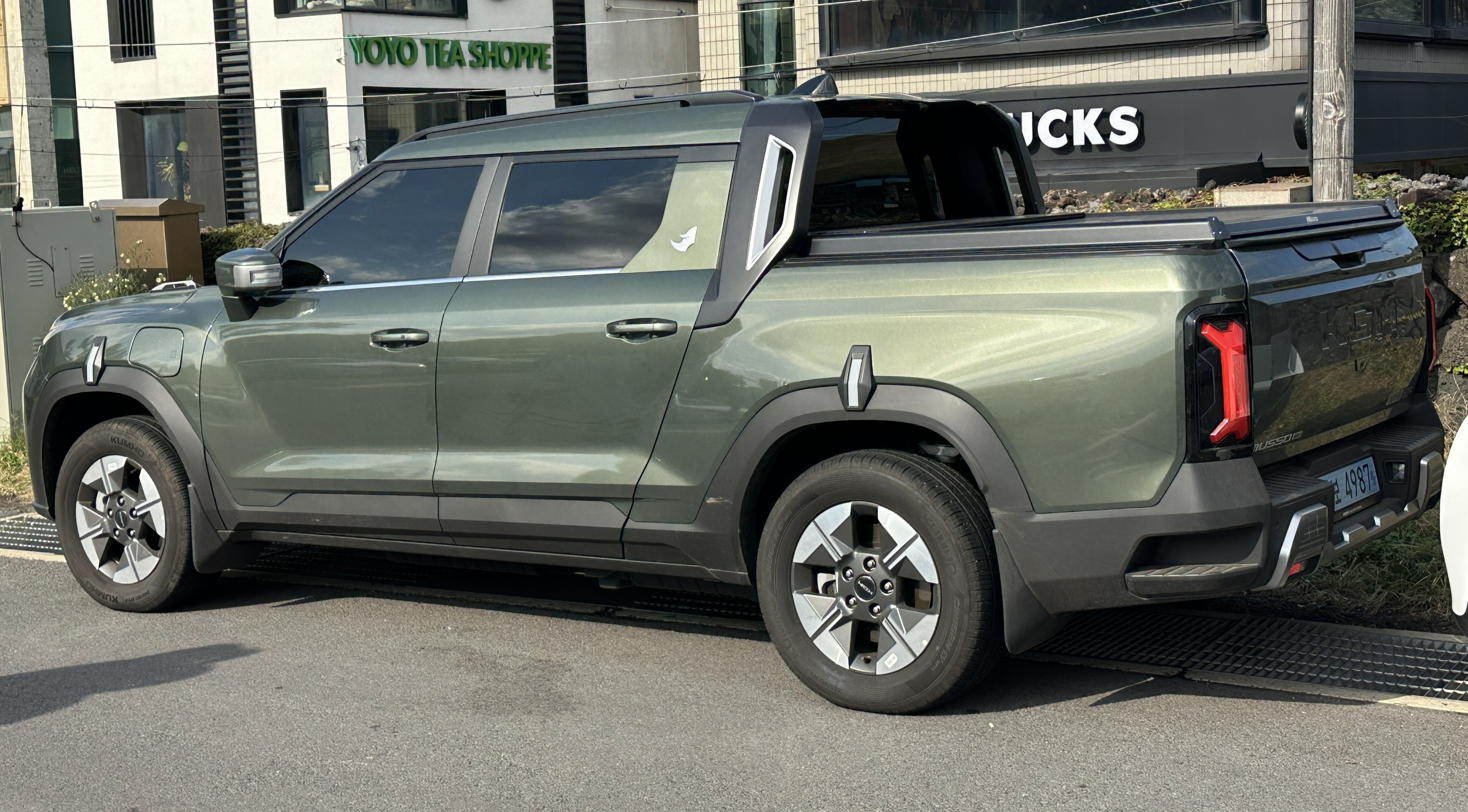
Rear view

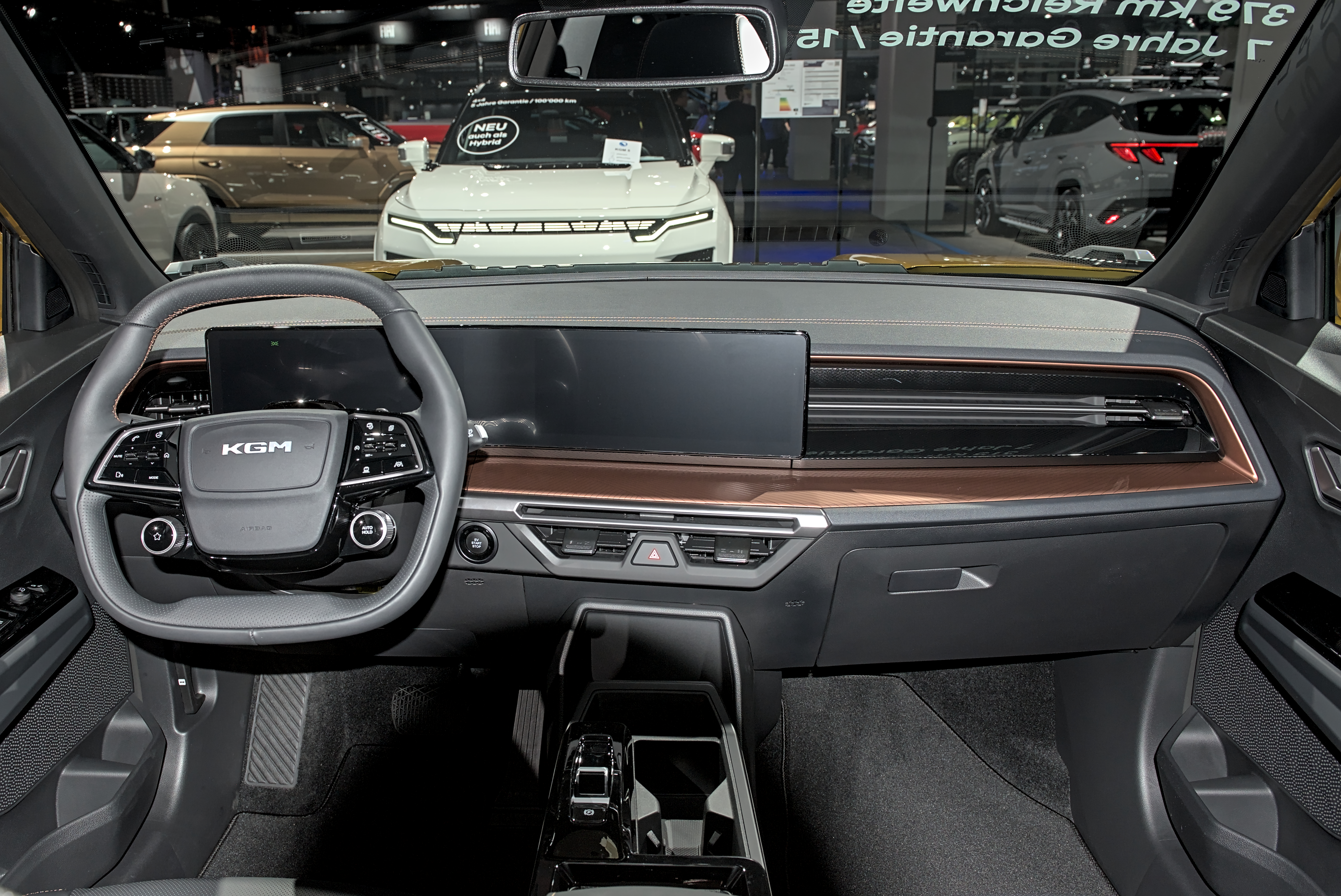
Interior

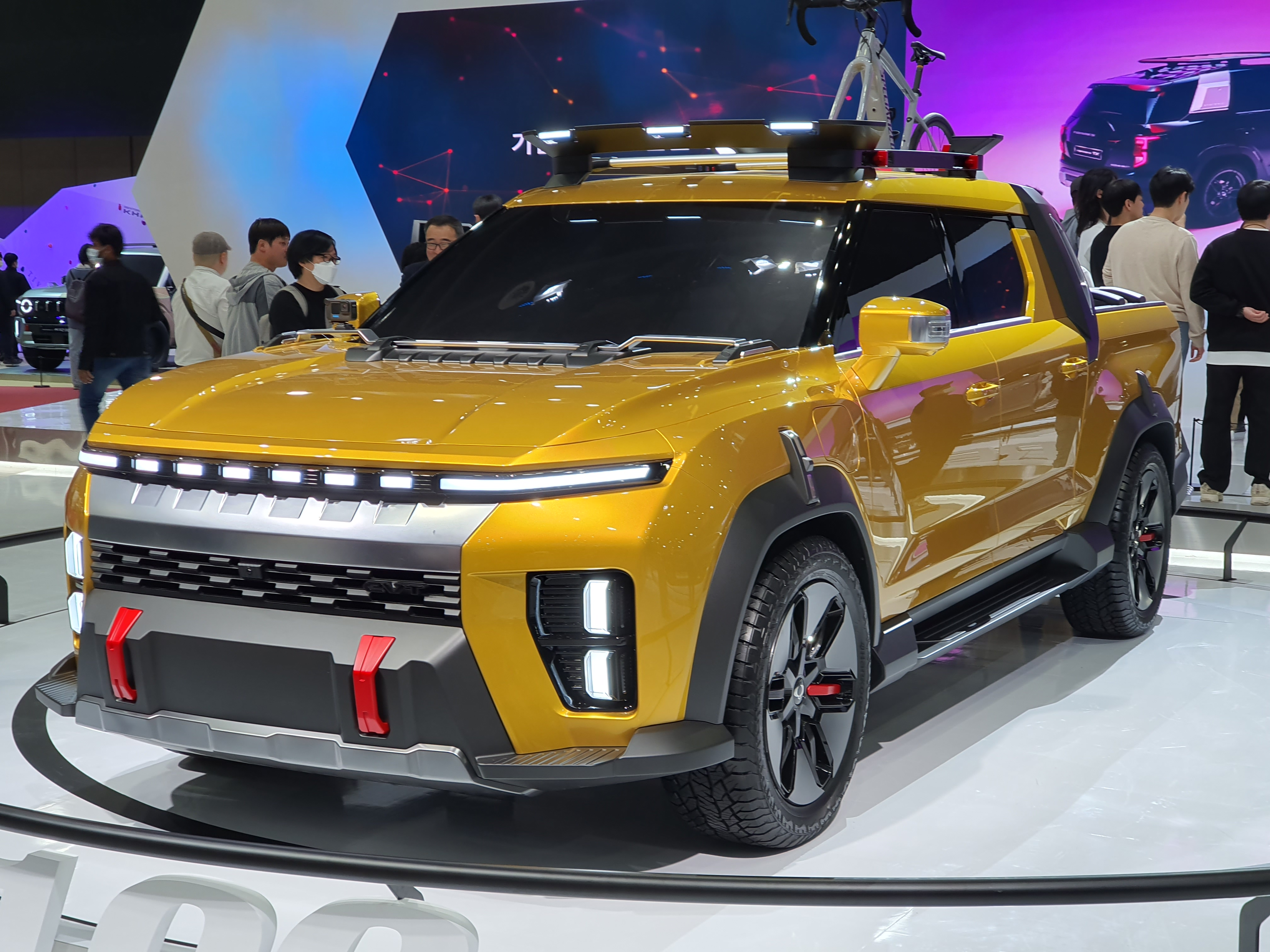
KGM O100 Concept

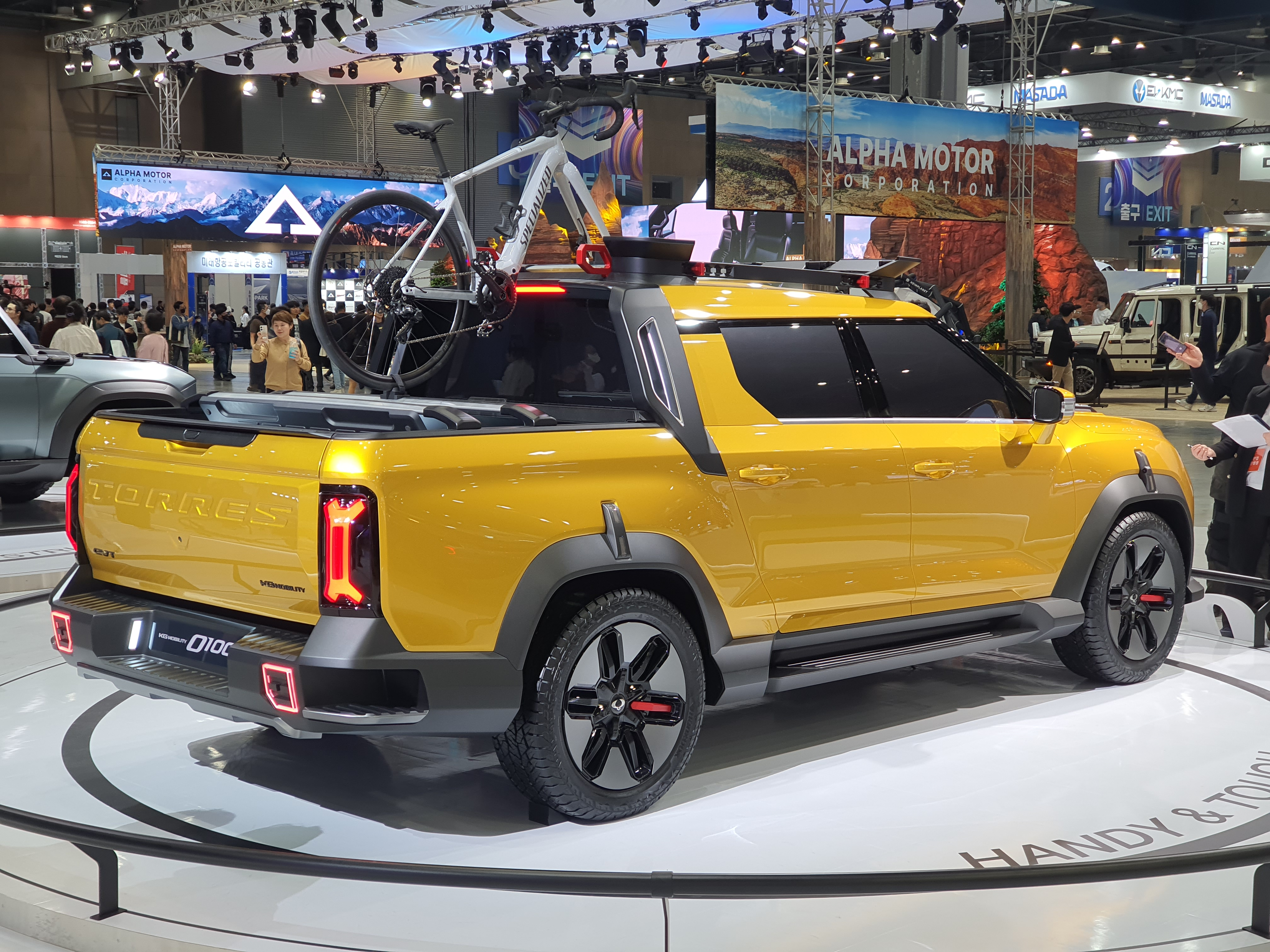
Rear view (O100 Concept)
