= Hyundai Pavise =

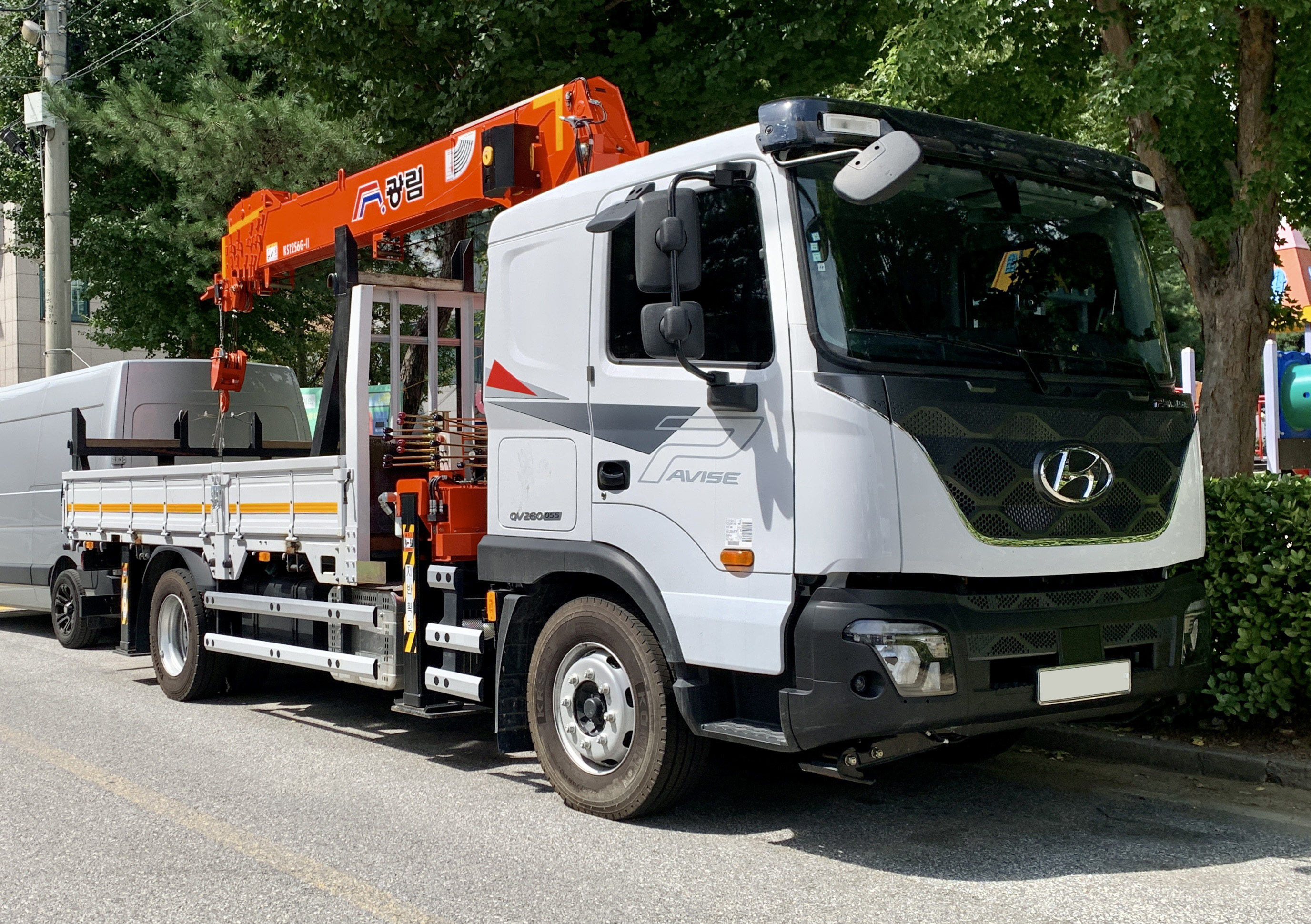

Overview
- Manufacturer: Hyundai Motor Company
- Production: 2019–present
- Assembly: Wanju, South Korea (Hyundai Motors Jeonju)

Body and chassis
- Related: Kia 2½ Ton Medium; Kia 5 Ton Medium

Powertrain
- Engine: 5.9 L (diesel); 6.8 L (diesel)
- Transmission: 12-speed ZF automated manual

Chronology
- Predecessor: Hyundai Mega Truck; Hyundai New Power Truck

The Hyundai Pavise (hangul:현대 파비스) is a truck produced by the South Korean manufacturer Hyundai.

== History ==
The Pavise was announced on August 29, 2019, in South Korea.

The Pavise is the successor to the Mega Truck and can carry 5.5 tons. The Pavise is equipped with a 5.9L diesel engine with a maximum output of 280 PS (206 kW; 276 hp) and a maximum torque of 95 kg⋅m (932 N⋅m; 687 lbf⋅ft) or a 6.8L diesel engine with a maximum output of 325 PS (239 kW; 321 hp) and a maximum torque of 120 kg⋅m (1,177 N⋅m; 868 lbf⋅ft). The combined transmission is a ZF 12-speed AMT.
