= Sibal (car) =

Sibal (시발)
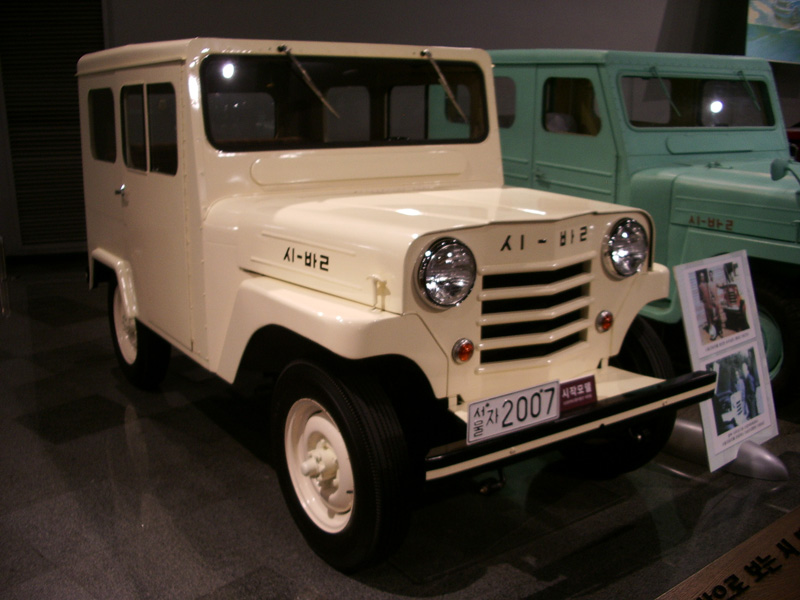
- A replica Sibal constructed by the Samsung Transportation Museum from the original blueprints.

Overview
- Production: 1955-1963
- Assembly: Euljiro, South Korea; Jongno, South Korea; Yongsan, South Korea

Body and chassis
- Body style: 2-door Jeep
- Related: Willys Jeep; Nissan Patrol (4W60)

Powertrain
- Engine: 1.3 L 1322 cc 4-cylinder
- Transmission: ADV 3 only go back to the 1st MT

Sibal (Korean: 시발; Hanja: 始發, IPA: [ɕiːbal]) was a South Korean automotive brand. It was the first South Korea passenger vehicle, produced from May 1955 to August 1963. Sibal means 'inception' or 'beginning'.

The first Sibal was hand-built by brothers Choi Mu-seong, Choi Hae-seong and Choi Soon-seong, based on the Willys Jeep. Initial demands for Sibal were low. However, after winning a presidential award, demand flourished.

== History ==
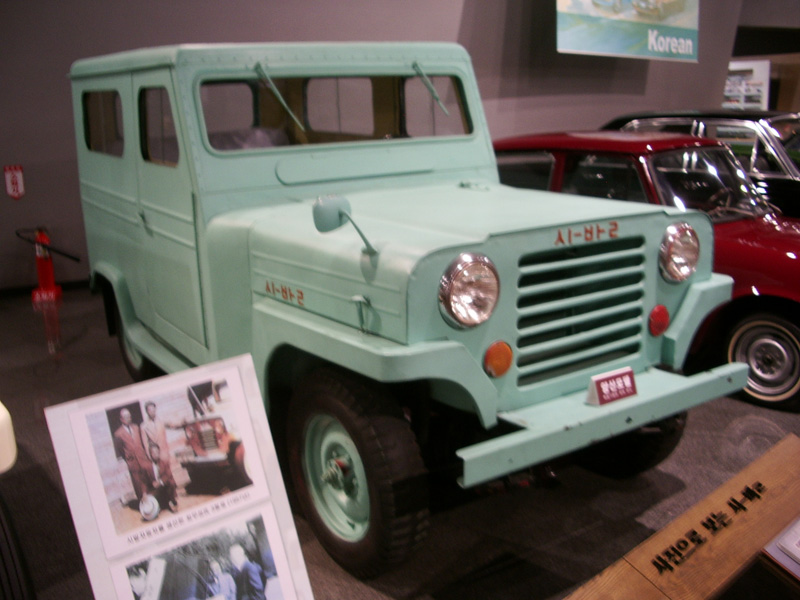
A replica Sibal constructed by an Samsung Transportation Museum.

First produced in 1955, the Sibal was initially hand-built using mostly imported parts, and a body shell made from old oil drums. Based on the Willys Jeep, production was slow until the vehicle gained a presidential award, whereupon it became a relatively popular choice for Korean taxi firms.

In 1962 the Korean government enacted The Automobile Industry Protection Act, forcing foreign manufacturers to partner with indigenous automotive companies. As a result early versions of companies such as Kia, SsangYong and others gained inroads. The Sibal was discontinued in 1963.

== See also ==
- Jiefang CA-30
