= Hyundai Mega Truck =

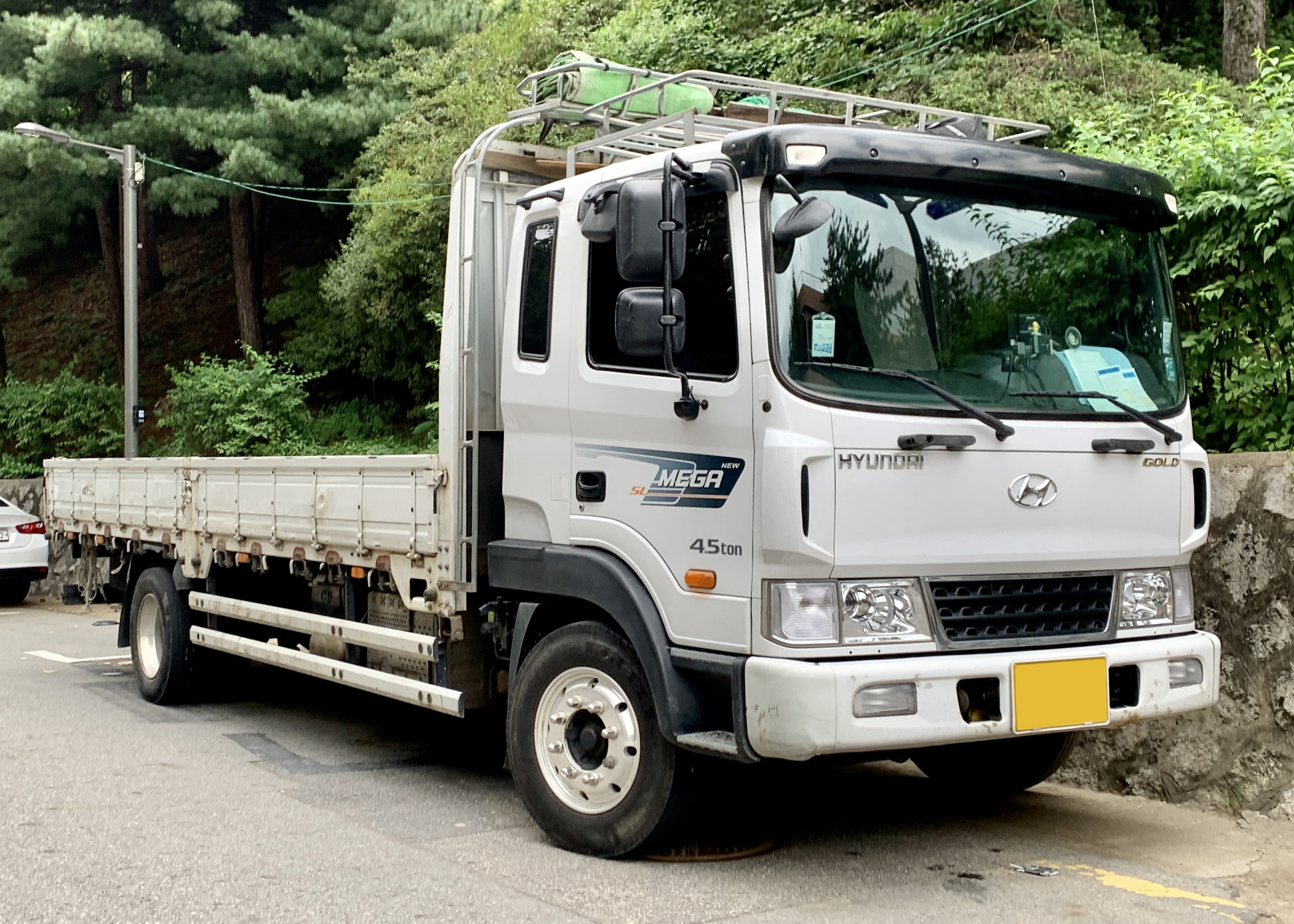

Overview
- Manufacturer: Hyundai Motor Company
- Also called: Hyundai New Super Truck Medium; Bering MD (North America)
- Production: 2004–July 2021
- Assembly: South Korea: Wanju
- Designer: Hyundai Motor Company Design Center; Bering Truck

Body and chassis
- Class: Rear wheel drive vehicles
- Body style: Truck

Powertrain
- Engine: Hyundai K-Engine
- Transmission: Hyundai (manual); Allison/ZF (automatic)

Dimensions
- Wheelbase: 3,845-4,895 (4.5t); 3,845-5,395 (5t)
- Length: 7,010-8,660
- Width: 2,255 (4.5t); 2,400 (5t)
- Height: 2,660
- Curb weight: 4,680(9,375)-5,280(9,975) (4.5t); 4,730(9,925)-5,490(10,185) (5t)

Chronology
- Predecessor: Hyundai Super Truck Medium
- Successor: Hyundai Pavise

The Hyundai Mega Truck (hangul:현대 메가트럭) is a line of medium-duty commercial vehicle by Hyundai Motor Company. The range was primarily available as cargo and dump truck. Its model truck name is 'Hyundai'.

Most medium-duty truck models are distinguishable by a front 'Hyundai Truck' badge, but the common Hyundai badge is usually used on the rear.

In Japan, Asia-Pacific, Mid-East, Africa, South America, its principal competitors are Kia Rhino.

It was replaced by the Hyundai Pavise in July 2021.

== Models ==
Hyundai Mega Truck is a name used by Hyundai Motor Company in commercial vehicle of trucks for two related models. Designed by Hyundai Motor Company and Bering Truck. Manufactured in Korea at the Hyundai Motor Company Jeonju Commercial Vehicle Plant located in Wanju County and assembled in 2004 to 2021.

- 4.5 ton Cargo (short/long/ultra long)
- 5 ton Cargo (short/long/ultra long/ultra long plus)
- 5 ton Dump (short)
