= Hyundai Aero Town =

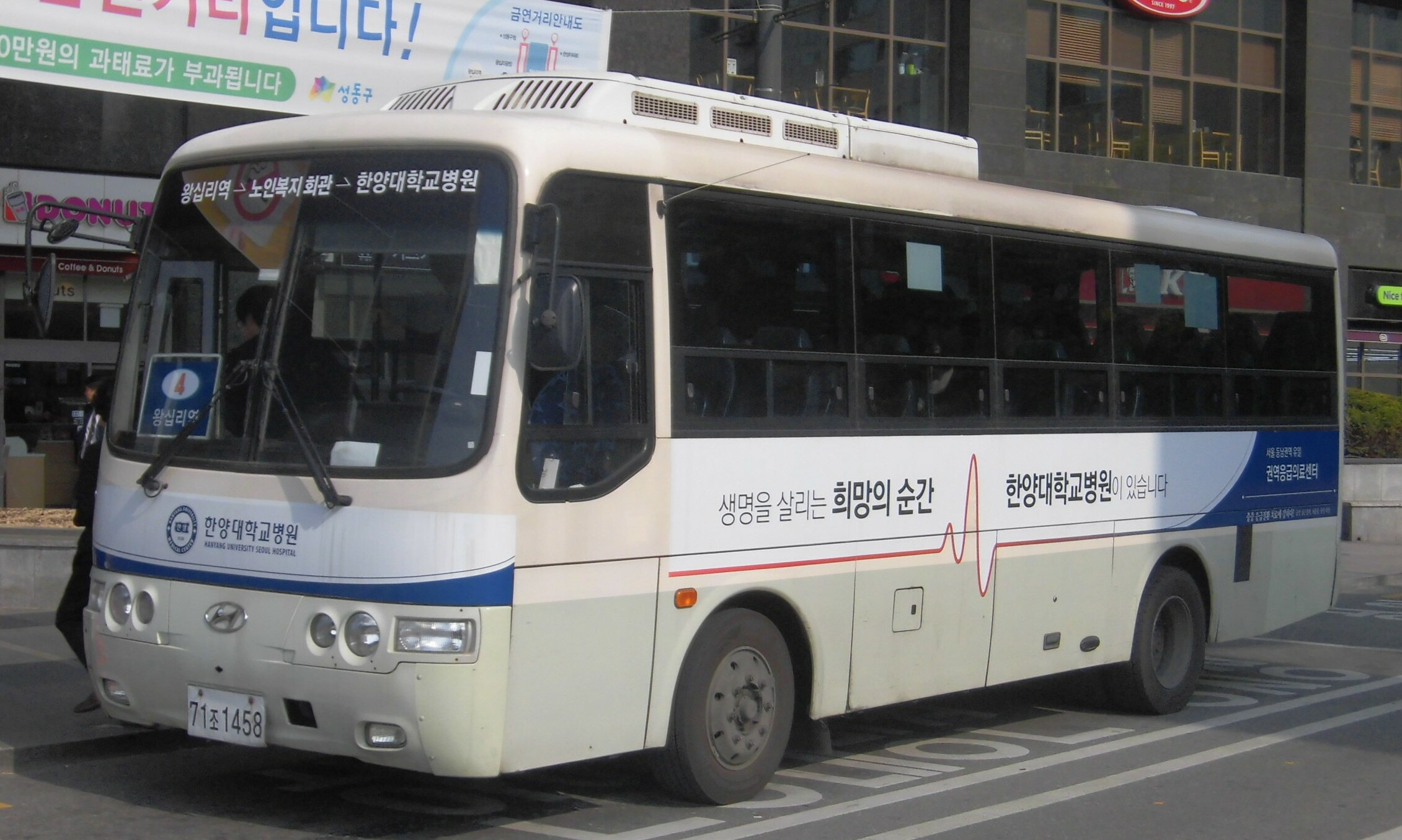

Overview
- Manufacturer: Hyundai Motor Company
- Production: 1994–2024
- Designer: Hyundai Motor Company Design Center

Body and chassis
- Class: Integral bus
- Body style: Midibus (short body & long body)
- Layout: Rear mid-engine, rear-wheel-drive
- Platform: Hyundai Bus Chassis
- Doors: 1 or 2 doors
- Related: Kia Cosmos

Powertrain
- Transmission: 5-speed manual

Dimensions
- Length: 8.9m to 10.1m
- Width: 2.35m
- Height: 3.0m

Chronology
- Predecessor: Hyundai DQ-7

The Hyundai Aero Town (hangul:현대 에어로타운) is a medium-duty midicoach manufactured by the truck & bus division of Hyundai. It was introduced in 1994. It is primarily used as a midcoach and a smaller intercity bus as either a complete bus or a bus chassis. It is distinguishable by a front 'Aero Town' badge, but the common Hyundai badge is usually on the rear. Its primary competitors with the Daewoo BH090 Royal Star and Daewoo BS090 Royal Midi, and its related to the now-discontinued Asia/Kia Cosmos AM818.

Due to the mandatory delivery of low-floor buses from January 19, 2023, it was confirmed that all Hyundai Motor Company's urban high-floor buses will be discontinued from January 2024, and product information was completely deleted from the high-floor homepage on January 3 of that year.

== Models ==
There are two variants of the Aero Town:

- Aero Town standard body: short wheelbase midibus.
- Aero Town long body: long wheelbase midibus.

== See also ==
- Hyundai Motor Company
- List of buses
