= Hyundai FB =

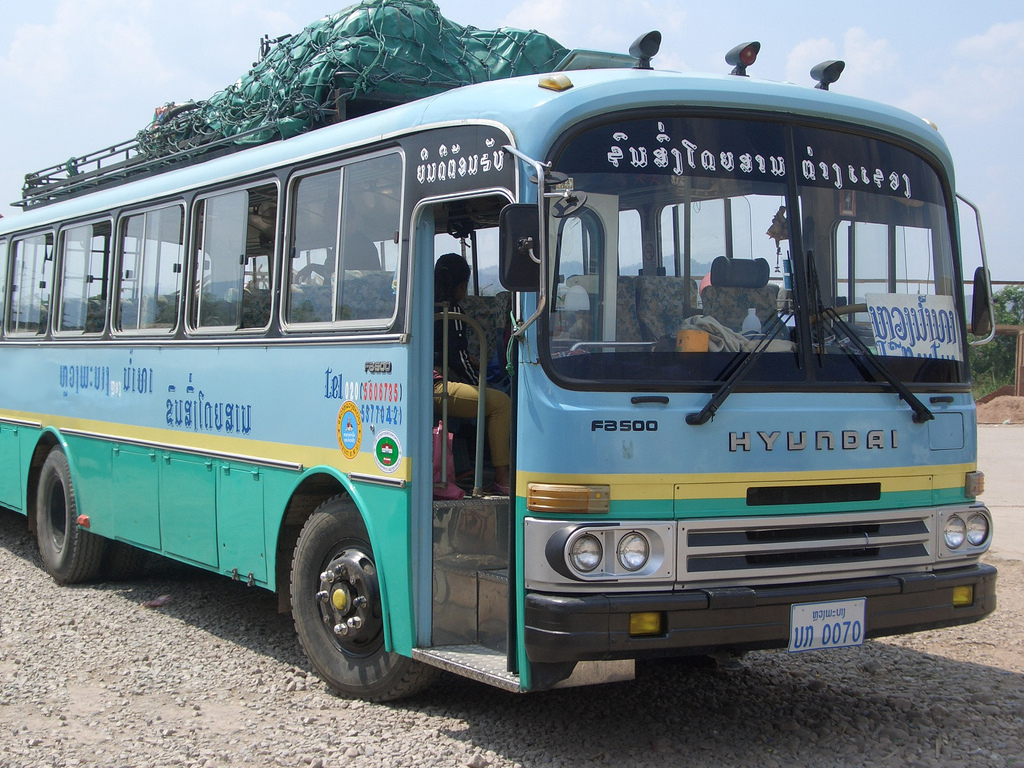
- Hyundai FB500 in Laos

Overview
- Manufacturer: Hyundai Motor Company
- Production: Worldwide
- Designer: Mitsubishi Fuso Truck and Bus Corporation

Body and chassis
- Class: Rear wheel drive vehicles
- Body style: Bus
- Platform: Mitsubishi Fuso FK/FM/FG Bus Chassis

Powertrain
- Transmission: Hyundai/Mitsubishi (manual)

The Hyundai FB (hangul: 현대 에프비, 현대FB) is a line of front engine bus built by Hyundai Motor Company.

They are commonly referred to as "FB", as in Front engine Bus.

In Japan, Asia-Pacific, Mid-East, Africa, South America, its principal competitors are Asia AM907, Daewoo BF101/BF105,

== Model concept ==
The FB bus and coach chassis evolved from designs by the Hyundai Motor Company's Thames commercial vehicle subsidiary. The engine was mounted at the front of the vehicle, ahead of the front-wheel-driven front and rear axles.

The original Hyundai FB485 and FB500 models later became the benchmark vehicles for a program of constant revision. New models were developed to replace the FB485 and FB500 in 1986, using the same front engine system. The floor height of the new vehicles was lowered, with the supercharged diesel engine tilted over to one side to accommodate this.

The FB designs were popular with South Korean bus companies in the 1980s, as considerable financial assistance was available to operators for fleet renewal. However, following the election of a more Conservative government in 1988 and the beginning of recession, demand for new buses declined rapidly and production of the FB range was halted.

Only a small number now remain in passenger use in South Korea, but many have been adapted for private use as tour buses and stock car transporters.

== Models ==
- FB 485: Economy Bus of urban & suburban bus
- FB 500: Economy & City Bus of urban & suburban bus

== See also ==
- Hyundai Motor Company
- List of buses
