= Hyundai Super Truck =

The Hyundai Super Truck (Hangul: 현대 슈퍼트럭) is a line of heavy-duty commercial vehicle manufactured by Hyundai Motor Company starting in 1997. On launch, they ranged from 8 to 25 tons.

Most heavy-duty truck models are distinguishable by a front 'Hyundai Truck' badge, but the common Hyundai and badge is usually used on the rear.

== Super Truck Medium ==
The Super Truck Medium was a line of medium-duty commercial vehicle by Hyundai Motor Company. The range was primarily available as cargo and dump truck ranging from 4.5 to 5 tons.
