= Koreatomy =

Koreatomy Automobile Parts Industries Company
- Type: Public
- Industry: Auto parts
- Founded: 1988
- Headquarters: Munrae-dong Yeongdeungpo-gu Seoul South Korea
- Products: Air suspension, Truck parts, Bus parts, Truck chassis manufacture
- Website: http://www.koreatomy.com (in Korean)

- Koreatomy
- Hangul: 한국토미자동차부품공업
- Hanja: 韓國토미自動車車部品工業
- Revised Romanization: Hanguk Tomi Jadongchaha Bupum Gongeop
- McCune–Reischauer: Han'guk T'omi Chatongch'a Pupum Kongŏp

Koreatomy Automobile Parts Industries Company is a Korean automotive manufacturing company headquartered in Munrae-dong Yeongdeungpo-gu Seoul, South Korea. It was established in 1988 as Koreatomy Automobile Industries Co., Ltd. The company is a supplier of air suspension based in truck and bus driveline and chassis to pusher axle in automobile parts technology. It provides components and systems to the commercial vehicle, off-highway/construction and logistic industries. licensed by Daehan Logistics and manufactures commercial vehicle use air suspension products in joint ventures.

Koreatomy products include automatic and manual air suspensions for trucks and buses; chassis components; shocks and struts; electronic air tube damping systems including Continuous Damping Control (CDC), Active Suspension (AS); Electronic Stability Control (ESC); axle drives; pusher axle system; less vibration system; and industrial drives.

Through the air suspension technology display position steering components and systems are produced, including air tube; Electric Power Steering (EPS); and hydro pusher axle. Its primary competitors are Hyundai Mobis and ZF Friedrichshafen.

== History ==
- 1988:Established in Koreatomy Automobile Industries Co., Ltd., Technical licensed by Putzmeister Germany Korean agent
- 1994:Technical licensed by Altas Germany Korean agent and MKG Crane Germany Korean agent
- 1995:Technical licensed by Hi-Steer (Link manufacturing)-USA in Korean agent, Manufactured Tri-Axle System for sale, Technical licensed by Supplier of Asia Automobile Co., Ltd., The first certified modification of truck Chassis by Korean Ministry Construction and Transportation
- 2000:Developed and certified Less Vibration System
- 2001:Established in Shanghai agent
- 2002:Certified Pusher Axle System, Start marketing of Less Vibration System, Expanded business to manufacturing and marketing KTM 22.5 ton Multi Cargo, Start export KT-9000S/12000NS to China
- 2003:Technical licensed by Timbren-Canada, Korean agent
- 2004:Expanded business to manufacturing and marketing KTM 23 to 24 Ton Multi Cargo and KTM Less Vibration axle system wing body truck, and Less Vibration system for Bus suspension In China, Automobile parts supplier of licensed by Anhui Ankai Automobile Co., Ltd.
- 2005:Expanded business to manufacturing and marketing in Multi Cargo and Wing Body Cargo air suspension parts, Automobile parts supplier of licensed by Dongfeng Motor Co., Ltd. and Xiamen Kinglong Motor Co., Ltd.
- 2006:Thanks award trade to Hyundai Motor Company
- 2007:OEM trade manufacturer by Hyundai Motor Company
- 2008:Event opening in KoreaTomy 20th anniversary
- 2009:Company changed by Koreatomy Automobile Parts Industries Company

== Parts products ==
- Truck and bus based air suspension
- Pusher axle system
- Less vibration system

== Special purpose vehicles and chassis parts ==
- Hyundai Trago - 22 to 27 ton air suspension parts
- Hyundai New Power Truck - 8 to 27 ton air suspension parts
  - 24 ton multi cargo (17 ton low deck)
  - 23.5 ton multi cargo (15 ton low deck)
  - 27 ton multi cargo (19.5 ton)
  - 11.5 ton wing body (11.5 ton ling deck)
  - 10 ton wing body low deck cargo (tag axle)
  - 13 ton cargo (9.5 ton)
  - 18 ton long deck cargo (11.5 ton long deck)
- Hyundai Mega Truck - 4.5 to 5 ton air suspension parts
  - 4.5 ton to 5 ton wing body cargo (4.5 ton/5 ton ultra long deck)
  - 7 ton long deck cargo (5 ton long deck cargo)
- Daewoo Novus - 4.5 to 27 ton air suspension parts
  - 24 ton cargo (pullcar)
  - 27 ton multi cargo
  - 11.5 ton ultra long deck wing body cargo (15.5 ton long deck)
- Daehan Logistics all use chassis
- Other truck air suspension chassis of Volvo FM, Scania 112, Mercedes-Benz Actros, MAN TGA, Iveco Stralis
- Other bus air suspension chassis of Hyundai Universe, Hyundai Aero, Hyundai Aero City, Hyundai Aero Town

=== Export truck air suspension chassis parts models ===
- Mitsubishi Fuso Fighter
- Mitsubishi Fuso Super Great
- Mitsubishi Fuso FK
- Mitsubishi Fuso FM
- Mitsubishi Fuso FP/FV
- Isuzu Forward
- Isuzu Giga
- Isuzu F-Series
- Isuzu E-Series
- Nissan Diesel Condor
- Nissan Diesel Quon
- Hino Ranger
- Hino Profia

== Manufacturing and marketing models ==
=== Current manufacturing parts model ===
- Koreatomy 24 ton multi cargo
- KTM 23.5 ton multi cargo
- KTM 27 ton multi cargo
- KTM 11.5 ton LV (Less Vibration) wing body
- KTM 10 ton wing body low deck cargo (tag axle)
- KTM 13 ton cargo
- KTM 18 ton long deck cargo
- KTD 24M, 24 ton cargo (fullcar)
- KTD 27S, 27 ton multi cargo
- KTD 11.5-UL 11.5 ton ultra long deck wing body cargo
- KTM 4.5 to 5 ton wing body cargo
- KTM 7 ton long deck cargo

=== Development parts model ===
- KTM 27 Ton Multi Cargo
- KTM 11.5 Ton Wing Body Cargo
- KTM 4.5 Ton Wing Body Cargo
- KTM 5 Ton Multi Cargo
- KTM 7 Ton Multi Cargo
- KTM 23 Ton Multi Cargo
- KTM 24 Ton Multi Cargo

=== Pusher axle system model ===
- KT-9000S/6500S
- KT-12000S/14000NS

== Overseas parts manufacturers ==
- Tumel Trading Company (Shanghai, China)

== See also ==
- Air suspension
