= 301st Division =

301st Division may refer to:

- 301st Infantry Division (Wehrmacht), Germany
- 301st Rifle Division, Soviet Union
- 301st Division (Vietnam)

== See also ==
- List of military divisions by number
- 301st (disambiguation)
