= Hanoi Capital Command =

Vietnamese military unit

Bộ tư lệnh Thủ đô Hà Nội (Hanoi Capital Command)
- Active: 10 October 1945 – present
- Country: Vietnam
- Type: Military district
- Role: Regular force
- Size: Equivalent to Corps
- Part of: People's Army of Vietnam
- Garrison/HQ: Cầu Giấy district, Hanoi
- Engagements: First Indochina War; Vietnam War; Sino-Vietnamese War
- Decorations: Gold Star Order

Commanders
- Current commander: Major General Đào Văn Nhận
- First party committee secretary: Senior Colonel Lưu Nam Tiến

The Hanoi Capital Command (Vietnamese: Bộ tư lệnh Thủ đô Hà Nội) of the People's Army of Vietnam, is directly under the responsibility of the Ministry of Defense of Vietnam, tasked to organise, build, manage and command armed forces defending Hanoi, the capital of Vietnam.

== History ==
The predecessor of Hanoi Capital Command was established in October 1945 as Hanoi Special Zone (lit. Khu đặc biệt Hà Nội). By November 1946, the state was reorganized into 12 War Zones Vietnamese: Chiến khu）. Hanoi was reorganized into the 11th War Zone, also known as the Hanoi Front. When the French Indochina War broke out on 19 December 1946, the Hanoi Front was annexed into 2nd War Zone. From 1 November 1948, 2nd War Area was placed directly under the authority of 3rd Joint Zone（Liên Khu, but by May 1949, Hanoi was split to reform the independent Hanoi Front again, falling under the command of the PAVN General Command. It was maintained until after 1954 under the name Hanoi Zone. By 1957, the General Command established troops of Hanoi under the control of General Command until 1 August 1964, when it was placed directly under the 3rd Military Region. However, in September 1964, it was reorganized again into the independent Capital Command. On 5 March 1979, by Ordinance 28-LCT, the Capital Military Region was established on the basis of the Capital Command, to manage militarily the city of Hanoi. In 1999, the jurisdiction of the Capital Military Region expanded to include the old Hà Tây province (merged with Hanoi since 2008).

On May 29, 2008, during the 3rd session of the 12th National Assembly, the National Assembly has approved Resolution 15 on the expansion of the jurisdiction of Hanoi to include the whole Hà Tây province, Mê Linh district of Vĩnh Phúc province and 4 wards (Đông Xuân, Tiến Xuân, Yên Bình, Yên Trung) of Lương Sơn district in Hòa Bình province. During the execution phase of Resolution 15, the (then) President Nguyễn Minh Triết issued Executive Order no. 16/2008/L-CTN to reorganize the Capital Military Region into the Hanoi Capital Command. Right after that, the (then) Minister of National Defence Phùng Quang Thanh issued Decision no. 2192/QĐ-BQP to incorporate Hà Tây province Military Command, Hanoi city Military Command and Mê Linh district Military Command (then under the jurisdiction of Vĩnh Phúc province Military Command in the 2nd Military Region) into the new Hanoi Capital Command.

== Agencies ==
- Command Office
- Command Staff Department
- Department of Politics
  - Division of Organization
  - Division of Cadre
  - Division of Policy
  - Division of Publicity and Training
  - Division of Cultural and Ideological Affairs
  - Military Court
  - Military Procuratorate
  - Museum of the Capital Military Command: No. 157, St. Đội Cấn, Quận Ba Đình, Hanoi
- Department of Logistics - Technicals
  - K90 Warehouse

== Subordinate units ==
- 301st Infantry Division
  - 59th Infantry Regiment
  - 692nd Infantry Regiment
  - 757th Infantry Regiment
  - 18th Signals Battalion
  - 25th Transportation Battalion
- 47th Infantry Regiment (Cadre)
- 48th Infantry Regiment (Cadre)
- 452nd Artillery Regiment (reserve forces training unit, equipped with D-44 field guns)
  - 1st Artillery Battalion
  - 2nd Artillery Battalion
  - 3rd Artillery Battalion
- 47th Armored Battalion (BTR-60PB APCs)
- Reconnaissance Battalion
- 18th Commando Battalion
- 610th Signals Battalion
- Guard - Military Police Battalion
- 544th Engineer Battalion
- Chemical Defense Company

=== Independent units ===
- 144th Guard Brigade of the General Staff
  - 1st Guard Battalion
  - 2nd Special Forces Battalion
  - 3rd Mechanized Infantry Battalion
  - 4th Training Battalion
  - 5th Special Forces Battalion
  - 18th Signals Company
  - 20th Reconnaissance Company
- 201st Tank Brigade of Tank - Armored Arms
  - 1st Tank Battalion (T-90S, T-54/T-55, BREM-1)
  - 2nd Tank Battalion (T-90S, T-54/T-55)
  - 3rd Tank Battalion (T-62, T-54/T-55)
  - 20th Reconnaissance Company (BRDM-2)
  - 22nd Repair Company
- 45th Artillery Brigade of Artillery - Missile Command
  - 1st Artillery Battalion (2S3 SPH, 2S1 SPH)
  - 2nd Artillery Battalion (D-20 howitzer)
  - 3rd Artillery Battalion (M-46 field gun)
  - Ceremonial Artillery Team (M101 howitzer)
  - Command Company
- K3 Special Reconnaissance Brigade of General Department of Defence Intelligence
- 1st Commando Brigade of Special Forces Arms
  - 7th Counter-Terrorism Team
- 205th Signals Brigade of Signals Arms
  - 75th Signals Battalion
  - 76th Signals Battalion
  - 77th Signals Battalion
  - 78th Signals Battalion
  - 79th Signals Battalion
- 6th Signals Regiment of Artillery - Missile Command
- 239th River Crossing Brigade of Engineering Arms (PMP, PTS, GSP-55)
  - 1st River Crossing Battalion
  - 2nd River Crossing Battalion
  - 3rd River Crossing Battalion
- 249th River Crossing Brigade of Engineering Arms (PMP, PTS, GSP-55, Zil-131 MRIV repair vehicle)
  - 1st River Crossing Battalion
  - 2nd River Crossing Battalion
  - 3rd River Crossing Battalion
- 971st Transportation Brigade of Vehicle - Transportation Department
  - 52nd Transportation Battalion (Zil-130)
  - 384th Transportation Battalion (Hyundai HD170 truck)
  - 679th Transportation Battalion (Hyundai HD170 truck)
- 2nd Composite Repair Battalion of Service and Arms Technical Department (MAZ-537) (repair and maintenance of heavy vehicles; transportation of tanks)
- 86th Chemical Defense Brigade of Chemical Arms
  - 901st Chemical Defense Battalion
  - 902nd Chemical Defense Battalion
  - 903rd Chemical Defense Battalion
- 186th Center of Cyberspace Operations Command (responsible for cyber security and technical support from Northern Region to North Central Vietnam)
  - 11th Detachment
  - 12th Detachment
  - 13th Detachment
- J106 Warehouse of Vehicle - Machinery Department
  - Defense Reserve Vehicle Depot
  - 1st Materials Storage Depot
  - 2nd Materials Storage Depot
  - Storage Workshop
  - Mechanical - Carpentry Workshop
  - Transportation Team

== Successive commander and leadership ==
=== Special Zone of Hanoi (1945–1946) ===
- Commander: Vương Thừa Vũ
- Chief of Staff: Hoàng Văn Khánh (general)

=== War Zone 11 (1946) ===
- Commander: Vương Thừa Vũ
- Chief of Staff:?
- Political Commissioners: Trần Độ

=== War Zone 2 (1946–1949) ===
- Commander: Hoàng Sâm
- Chief of Staff: Lê Hiến Mai

=== Front Hanoi (1949–1957) ===
- Commander: Phùng Thế Tài
- Chief of Staff: Trần Quốc Hoàn

=== The Troops of Hanoi (1957–1964) ===
- Commander: Col. Vũ Văn Sự
- Chief of Staff:?

=== Command of Capital (1964–1979) ===
- Commander: Snr. Col. Lê Nam Thắng
- Political Commissioners: Trần Vỹ

=== Capital Military Zone (1979–present) ===
==== Commander ====
- Lt. Gen. Đồng Sĩ Nguyên (1979–1980)
- Maj. Gen. Lư Giang (1980–1989)
- Lt. Gen. Chu Duy Kính (1989–1997)
- Maj. Gen. Phạm Văn Tánh (1997–2002)
- Maj. Gen. Nguyễn Như Hoạt (2002–2008)
- Lt. Gen. Phí Quốc Tuấn (2008–2015)
- Maj. Gen. Nguyễn Doãn Anh (2015–2018)
- Maj. Gen. Nguyễn Hồng Thái (2018–2019)
- Lt. Gen. Nguyễn Quốc Duyệt (2019–2025)
- Maj. Gen. Đào Văn Nhận (2025–present)

==== Political Commissioners, Deputy Commanders of Politics ====
- Lt. Gen. Trần Độ (1946–1950)
- Trần Vỹ (1964–1969)
- Maj. Gen. Đoàn Phụng (1969–1973)
- Maj. Gen. Hoàng Kim (1979–1983)
- Maj. Gen. Chu Duy Kính (1986–1989)
- Lt. Gen. Nguyễn Đăng Sáp (2007–2008)
- Maj. Gen. Phùng Đình Thảo (2008–2010)
- Lt. Gen. Lê Hùng Mạnh (2010–2015)
- Lt. Gen. Nguyễn Thế Kết (2015–2019)
- Lt. Gen. Nguyễn Trọng Triển (2019–2023)
- Lt. Gen. Trần Ngọc Tuấn (2023–2025)
- Sr. Col. Lưu Nam Tiến (2025–present)
