= Hyundai Xcient =

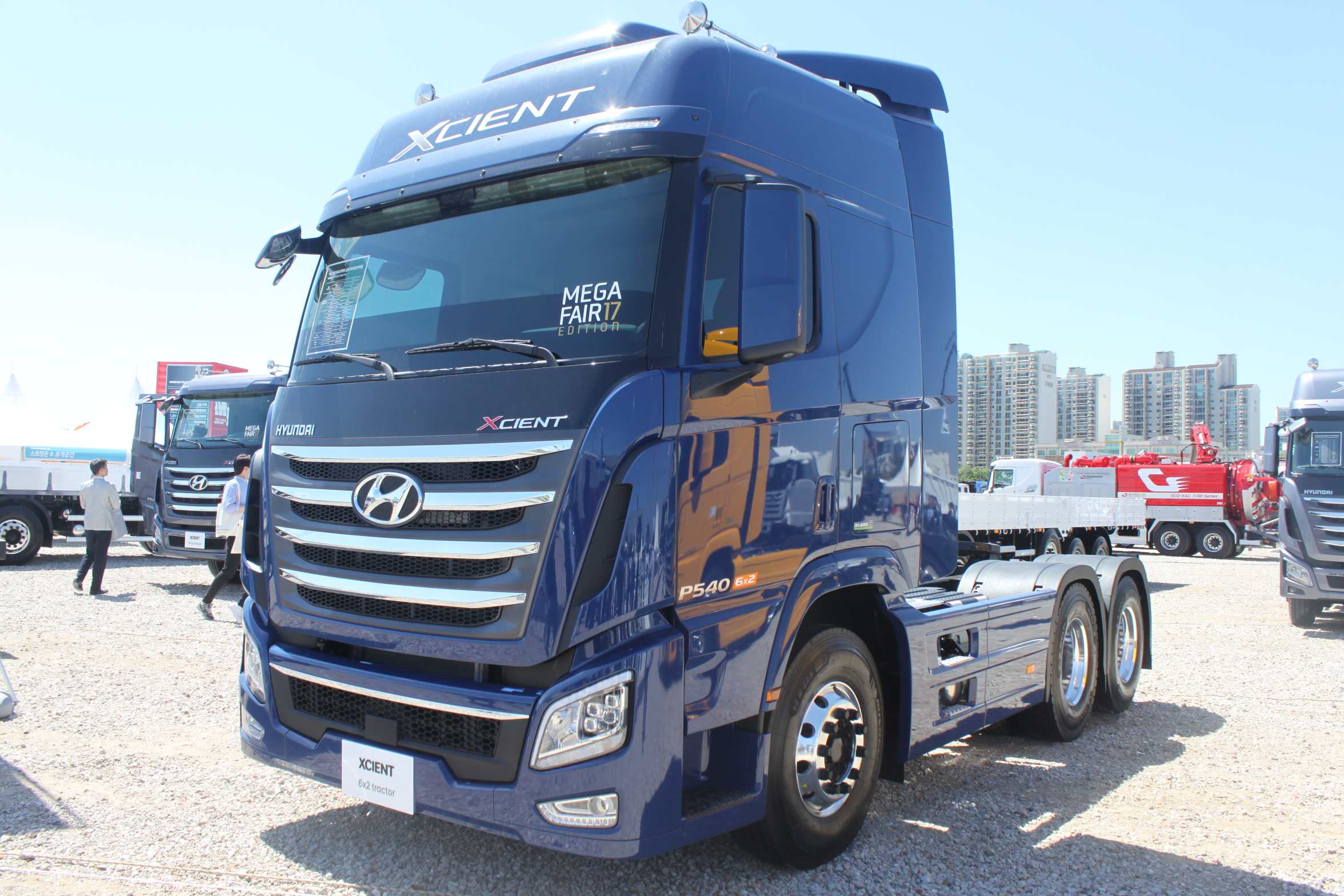

Overview
- Also called: Hyundai Trago Xcient; Hyundai Super Truck Xcient (Africa, Asia Pacific, Middle East, Latin America); Inokom Xcient
- Production: 2013–present
- Assembly: Jeonju, South Korea (Hyundai Motors Jeonju); Ziyang, China (Sichuan Hyundai); Kaliningrad, Russia (Avtotor); Santa Rosa, Laguna, Philippines (HARI); Rakovica, Belgrade, Serbia (IMR) (Note: Future new generation Hyundai Xcient FCEV production assembly for European market.); Győr, Hungary (Rába); Maribor, Slovenia

Powertrain
- Engine: H engine (D6HB38) (Max. power: 380 ps, Max. Torque: 160 kg·m, Displacement: 9,960 cc, Euro 3), Powertec engine (D6CC41) (Max. power: 410 ps, Max. Torque: 188 kg·m, Displacement: 12,920 cc, Euro 4) Q engine (D6AC) (Max. power: 340 ps, Max. Torque: 140 kg·m, Displacement: 11,149 cc, Euro 1)

Chronology
- Predecessor: Hyundai Trago; Hyundai New Power Truck

The Hyundai Xcient is a South Korean truck made by Hyundai Motor Company. It was presented at the Seoul Motor Show 2013 as the successor of Hyundai Trago.

== Configuration and technology ==
The Xcient was developed during 3 years at a cost of ₩200 billion. Compared to its predecessor, it features increased cabin space and modernized driver comfort equipment.

At introduction, Hyundai offers two engine variants, a 10.1-liter (common-rail injection) diesel engine with 414 hp and a top-of-the-line 12.7-liter version with 520 hp. The Xcient is available with engine powers ranging from 360 to 520 hp in Euro III and Euro IV variants, with a 12 or 16 speed dual-clutch transmission. The Xcient offers a total interior volume of more than 1,000 liters for the 3.92 meter high roof version.

A level 3 autonomous version is in development by Hyundai.

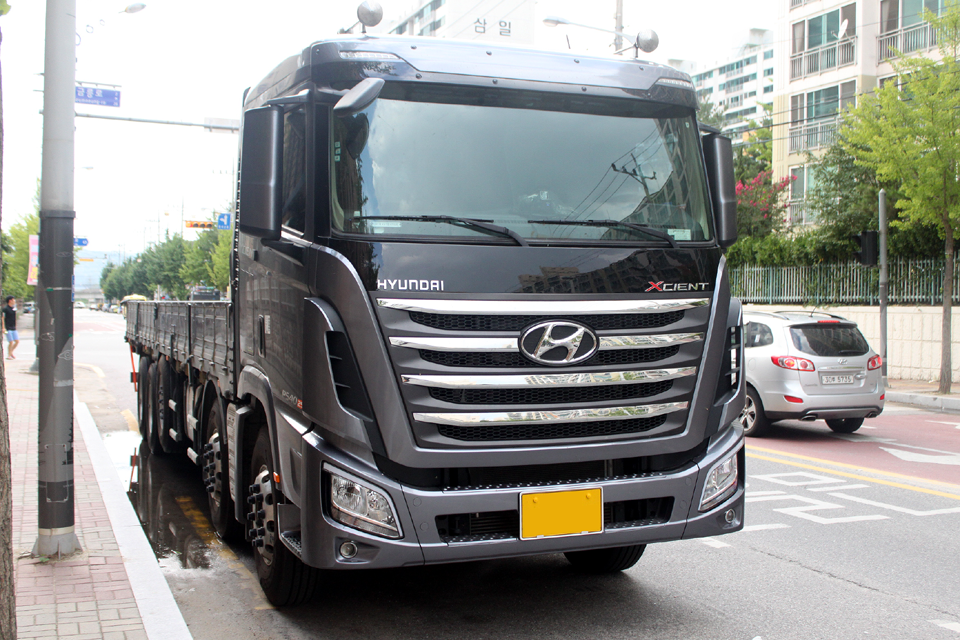
Hyundai Xcient Cargo Euro6 540

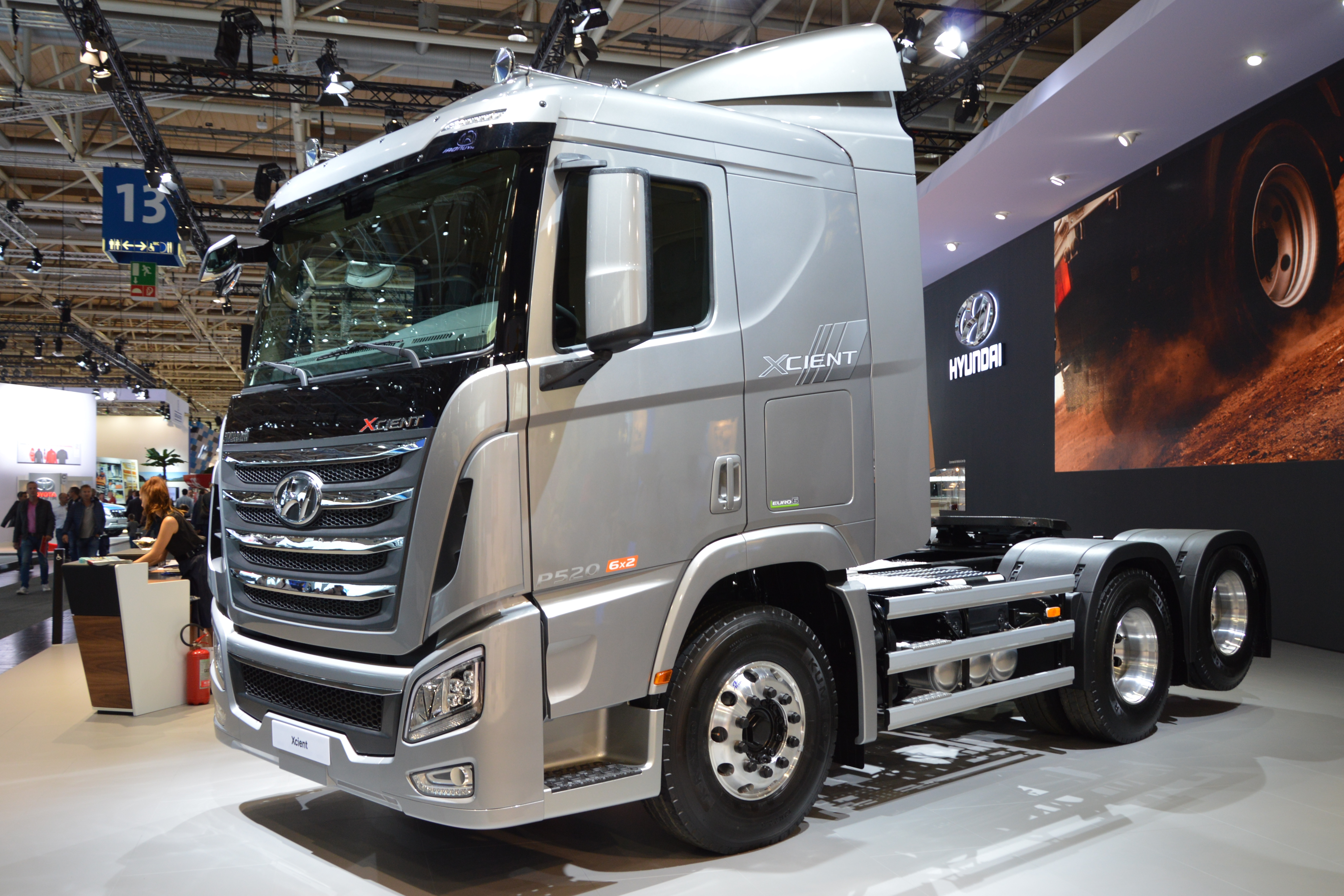
Hyundai Xcient 6x2 tractor

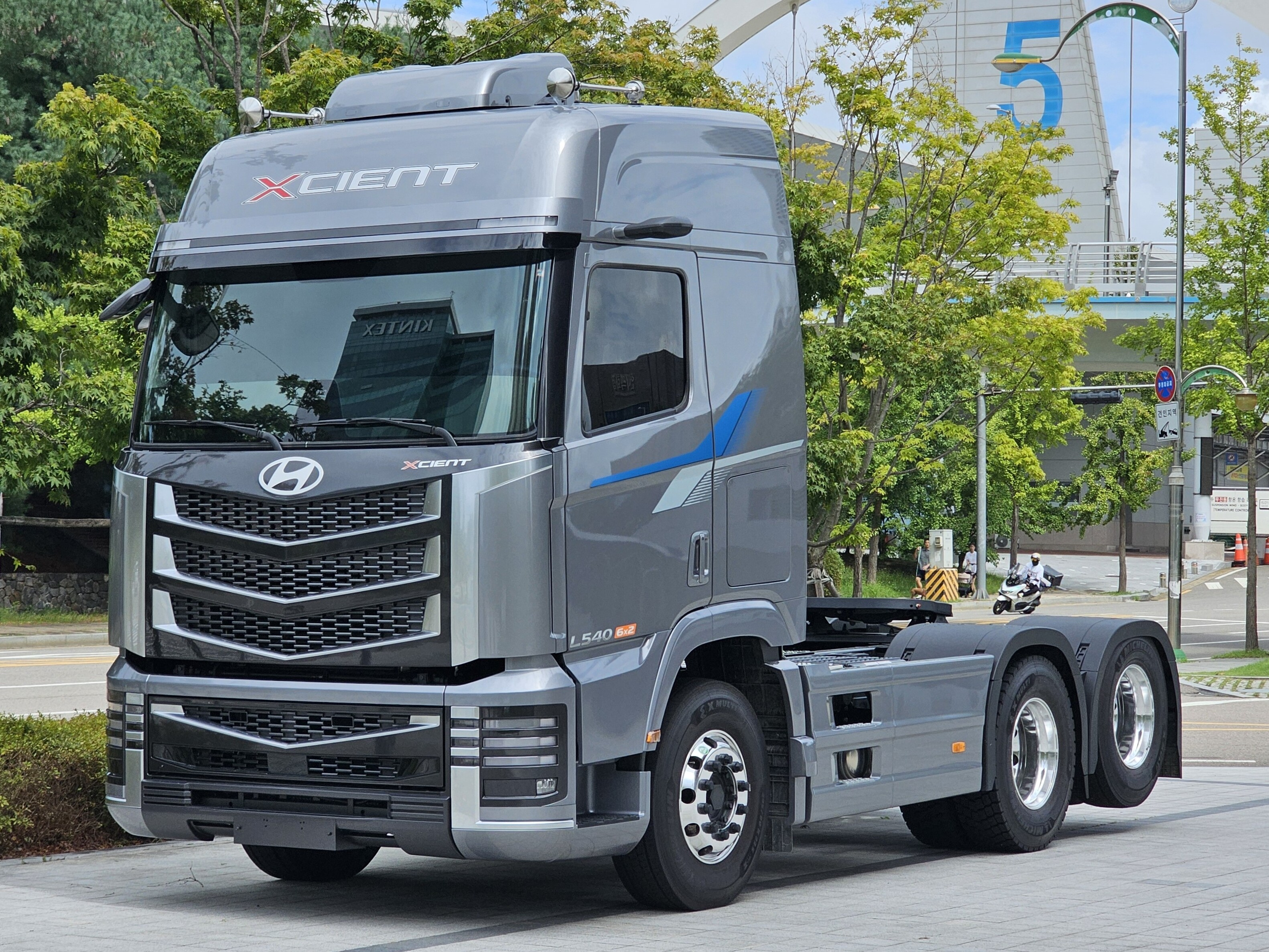
Hyundai Xcient 2025 facelift

== Hydrogen fuel cell versions ==
In 2020, Hyundai, in a joint venture with Swiss company H2 Energy, started mass manufacturing hydrogen fuel cell-powered 34-ton cargo trucks under the brand Xcient. The vehicles are able to travel 400 kilometres (250 mi) on a full tank and they take 8 to 20 minutes to fill up. In the case of Switzerland, a total of 1600 units is expected to be shipped by 2025. Currently, 46 units of the older model are sent, and 140 units of the new model will be shipped by 2021.

In December 2022, the sales began in South Korea. In addition to hydrogen fuel cell systems, collision safety systems, downhill cruises, disc brakes, and tire pressure warnings, South Korea operates 4X2/6x4 special chassis cabs and 6X4 wing bodies.

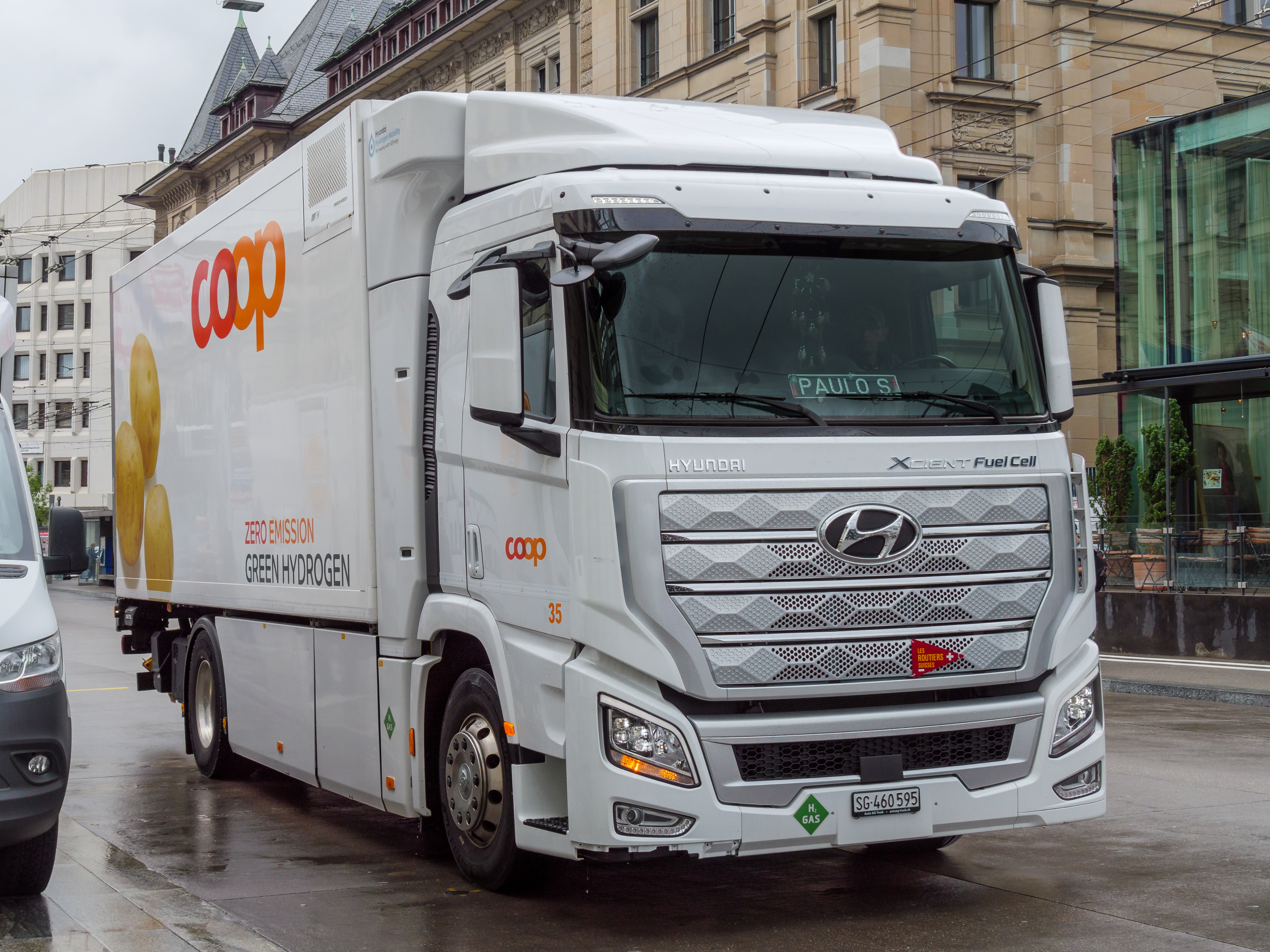
Hyundai Xcient Fuel Cell

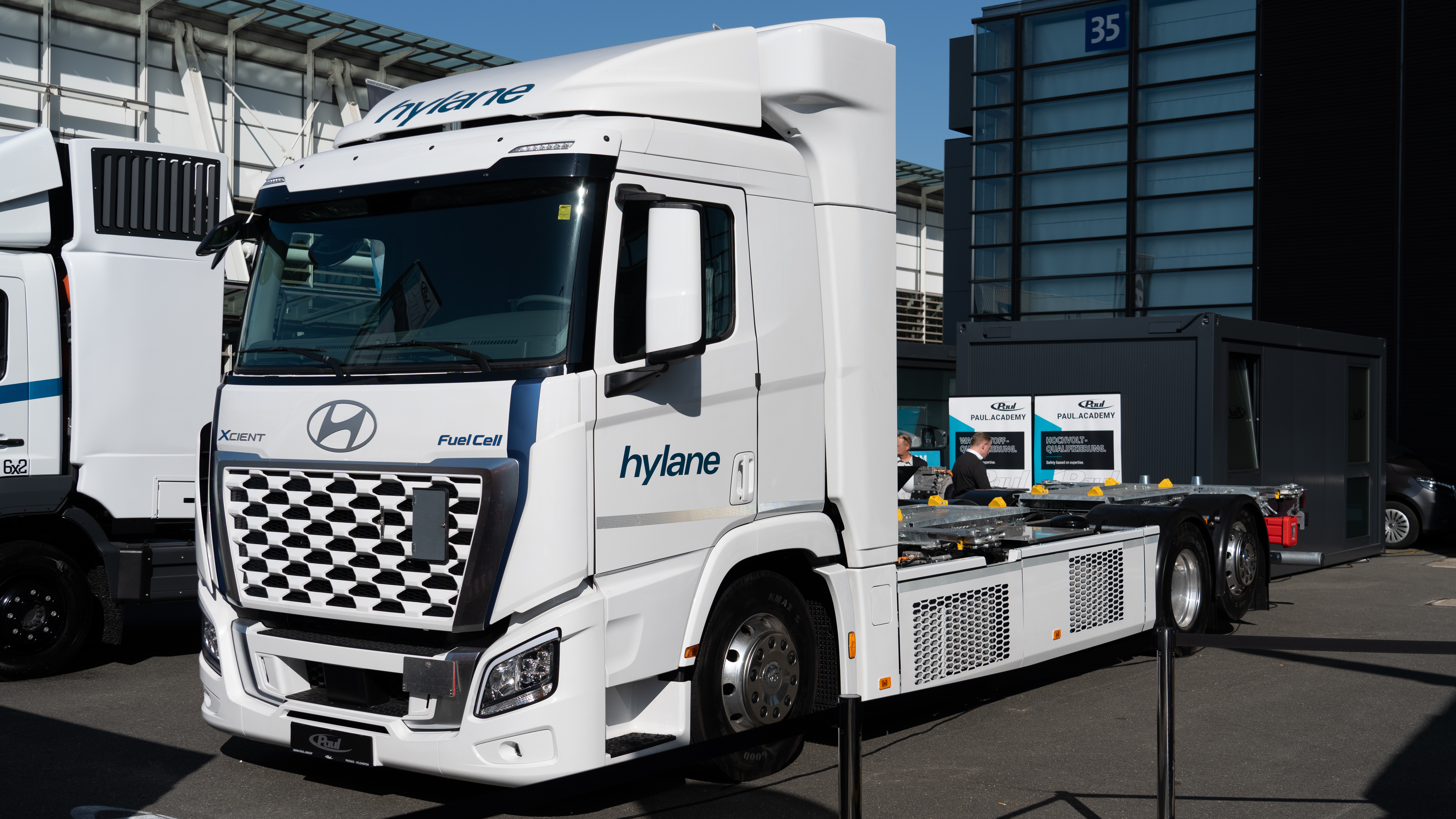
Hyundai Xcient Fuel Cell 2025 facelift
