= Bering Truck =

American truck manufacturer

The Bering Truck Corporation was an American manufacturer and distributor of trucks, headquartered in Front Royal, Virginia and Panama City, Panama. It distributed Hyundai-made trucks with American automotive components.

== History ==
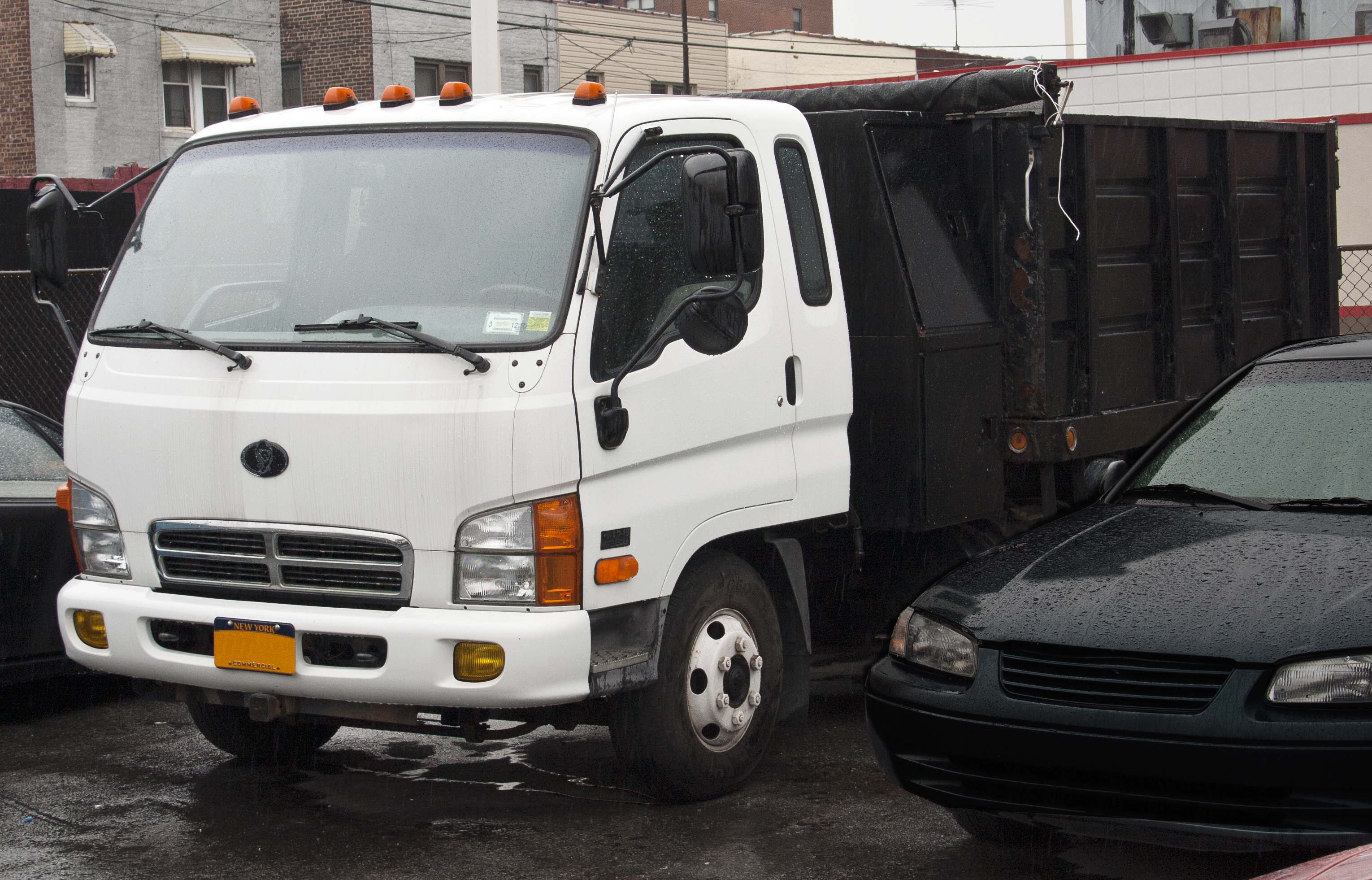
2000 Bering LD15

Established and founded in 1997 in Front Royal, Virginia, Bering Truck was the first new American truck manufacturer and distributor established in over 70 years. In partnership with Hyundai Motor Company of Korea, three classes of trucks were launched into the US market. The first trucks were sold in 1999 and in one year, Bering was the fastest growing US truck company having sold more than 1,400 trucks.

Bering was forced to cease operations in 2001 after its sole supplier entered into a relationship with Daimler-Chrysler and terminated the Bering agreements. Litigation ensued; in an international arbitration between Bering and Hyundai, the arbitration panel found (in 2004) that Hyundai had breached its agreements with Bering in bad faith. A federal antitrust case filed by Bering against Hyundai and Daimler-Chrysler was settled out of court in 2006.

Today, after a lawsuit against Hyundai and Daimler-Chrysler in 2006, Bering Truck moved its business to Panama from the United States, changed its business from truck manufacturer and distributor to an importer of South Korean used vehicles in Panama and renamed as Bering Motors SA in Panama.

== Products ==
=== Trucks ===
- Bering LD (Hyundai Mighty)
  - Bering LD15—class 4 truck with Detroit Diesel 638 engine and Allison automatic transmission
- Bering MD (modern super truck - Hyundai Mega Truck)
  - Bering MD23 and MD26—class 6 truck with Cummins ISB engine
- Bering HDMX (Hyundai New Power Truck)— Concrete mixer truck with Cat C12 engine and Eaton transmission

=== Other ===
- Industrial Engines
- Truck Chassis
- Bus chassis
