= 301st Division (Vietnam) =

301st Infantry Division
- Founded: 1979-02-27
- Branch: People's Army of Vietnam
- Type: Infantry
- Size: 10,000 troops
- Part of: High Command of Capital Hanoi
- Garrison/HQ: Hanoi, Vietnam

Commanders
- Current commander: Colonel Nguyen Dinh Thao

The 301st Division is an infantry division of the Vietnam People's Army. It is under the command of the High Command of Capital Hanoi, tasked with both building, training, and maintaining a high level of combat readiness, coordinating with local armed forces to defend the capital.

== History ==
On February 27, 1979, the Ministry of National Defence issued a Decision to establish the 301st Division under the Hanoi Capital Command with the task of both building, training, and maintaining a high level of combat readiness; Coordinate with local armed forces in combat operations in the defense, attack, and counter-attack zones, protecting the Capital.

== Regiments ==
692nd Infantry Regiment (Thanh Xuyen Regiment)

757th Infantry Regiment

59th Infantry Regiment
