= 301st Infantry Division (Wehrmacht) =

- 301. Infanterie-Division
- Active: August 1939 – 14 October 19391939
- Country: Nazi Germany
- Branch: Army
- Type: Infantry
- Role: Division
- Engagements: World War II: Invasion of Poland

The 301st Infantry Division (German: 301. Infanterie-Division) was an infantry division of the German Heer during World War II.

== History ==
The 301st Infantry Division was formed in August 1939, just before the outbreak of World War II, from Netze Brigade, a frontier guard brigade that consisted of two frontier guard regiments. There, Netze Brigade had served as part of

the 12th Frontier Guard Command.

During the Invasion of Poland, the 301st Infantry Division fought skirmish actions in the Küstrin area.

On 14 October 1939, after the conclusion of the invasion, the 301st Infantry Division was dissolved.
