= Hyundai Trago =

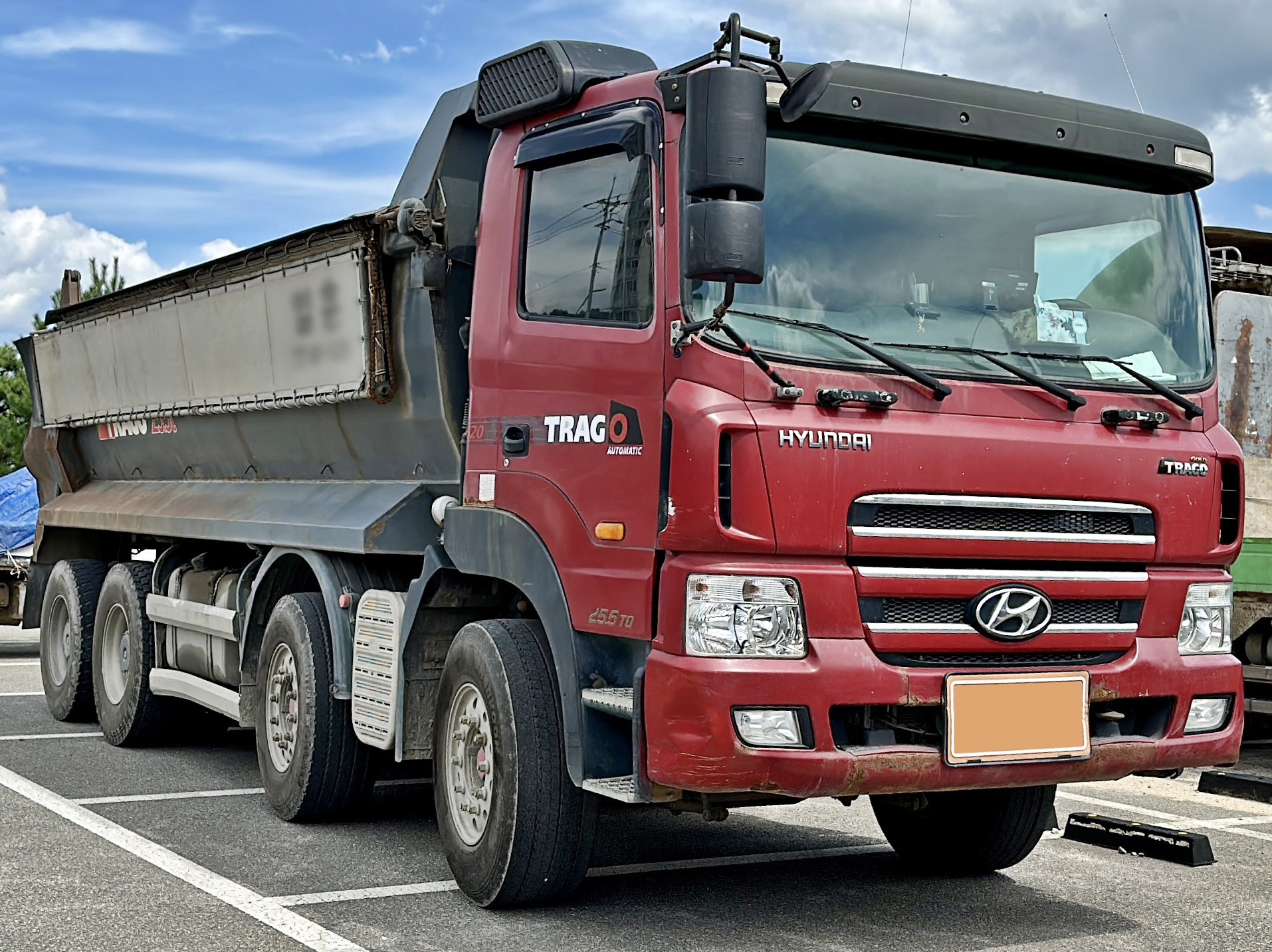
- Hyundai Trago

Overview
- Manufacturer: Hyundai Motor Company
- Also called: Hyundai New Power Truck (South Korea); Hyundai Super Truck (Africa, Asia Pacific, Middle East, Latin America)
- Production: 2004–2013
- Assembly: Jeonju, South Korea (Hyundai Motor)
- Designer: Hyundai Motor Company Design Center

Body and chassis
- Class: Rear wheel drive vehicles
- Body style: Truck

Powertrain
- Engine: Hyundai Powertec Engine
- Transmission: ZF (automatic)

Dimensions
- Wheelbase: 8,300mm/7,470mm (cargo); 6,200mm (dump); 4,650mm (tractor)

Chronology
- Predecessor: Hyundai New Power Truck
- Successor: Hyundai Xcient

The Hyundai Trago (hangul:현대 트라고) is a line of heavy-duty commercial vehicle by Hyundai Motor Company in luxury commercial vehicle. The range was primarily available as luxury cargo and dump truck, tractor. Its model truck name is 'Hyundai', but in USA and Canada it was known as Bering HD or Bering HDMX, and Korea truck based it was known as Hyundai New Power Truck.

Most heavy-duty truck models are distinguishable by a front 'Hyundai Truck' badge, but the common Hyundai and Trago badge is usually used on the rear.

== Models ==
Hyundai Trago is a name used by Hyundai Motor Company for two series of heavy duty trucks. Designed by Hyundai Motor Company, it was manufactured in Korea at Hyundai Motor Company Jeonju Commercial Vehicle Plant. The Trago has been built since October 2006.

=== Model name (South Korea) ===
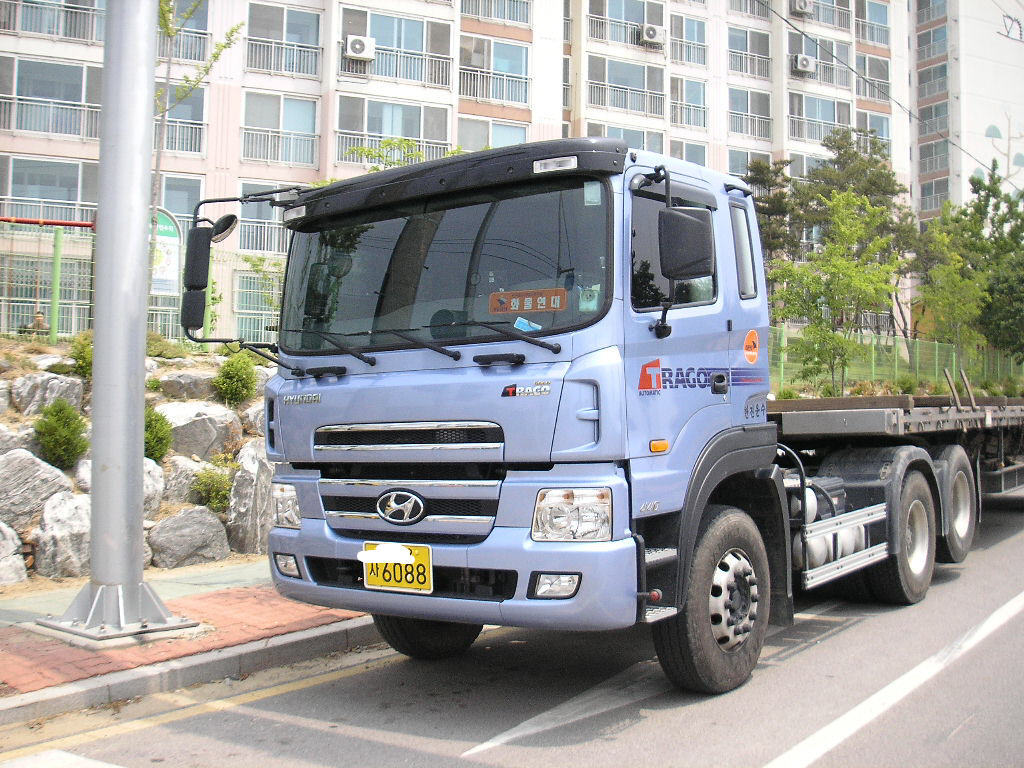
2007 Hyundai Trago in South Korea

- Gold (Economy & Hi-Power engine model)
- Pro (Economy engine model)

=== Lineup ===
Other special vehicle models in Hyundai Special Vehicles

Cargo

- 19 ton (8x4, economy/hi-power, Ultra long)
- 19.5 ton (8x4, economy/hi-power, Short)
- 25 ton (10x4, ultra long)

Dump

- 24 ton (8x4, short)
- 25.5 ton (8x4, short)

Tractor

- 6x2:440
- 6x4:380/410/440

== Technology ==
=== Engine ===
- 8x4 Cargo:380 hp (PS)/160 kg·m, 410 hp (PS)/188 kg·m
- 10x4 Cargo:440 hp (PS)/206 kg·m
- 8x4 Dump:460 hp (PS)/225 kg·m
- 6x2 Tractor:440 hp (PS)/206 kg·m
- 6x4 Tractor:380 hp (PS)/160 kg·m, 410 hp (PS)/188 kg·m, 440 hp (PS)/206 kg·m

=== Transmission ===
- 8x4 Cargo (ZF only):forward 16/reverse 2
- 10x4 Cargo (ZF only):forward 16/reverse 2
- 8x4 Dump (ZF only):forward 16/reverse 2
- 6x2 Tractor (ZF only):forward 16/reverse 2
- 6x4 Tractor (ZF only):380-forward 10/reverse 2, 410*440-forward 16/reverse 2
