= Hyundai New Power Truck =

Hyundai New Power truck
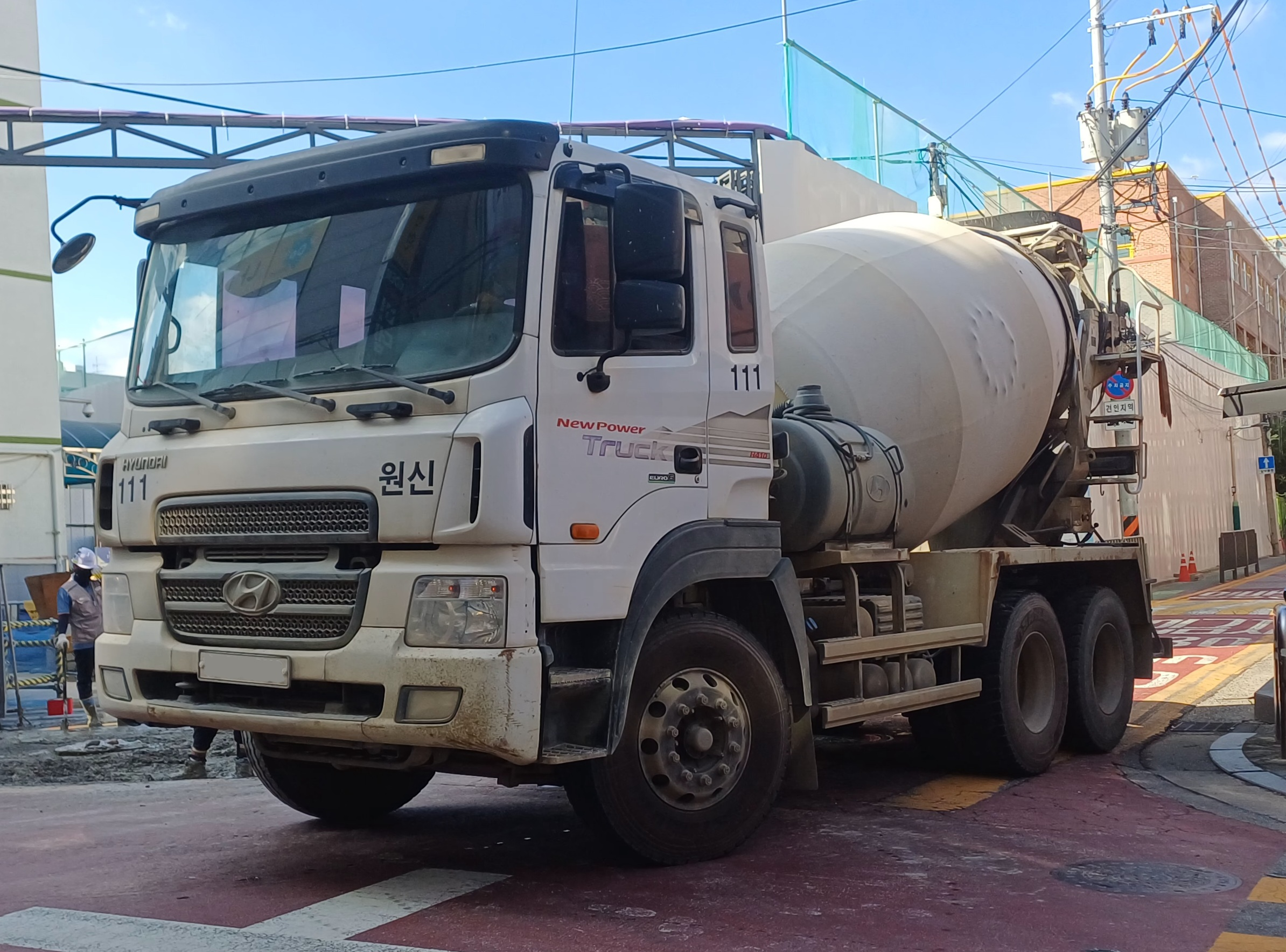
- Hyundai New Power Truck

Overview
- Manufacturer: Hyundai Motor Company
- Also called: Hyundai Super Truck (Africa, Asia Pacific, Middle East, Latin America)
- Production: 2004–present
- Assembly: South Korea: Wanju
- Designer: Hyundai Motor Company Design Center; Bering Truck

Body and chassis
- Class: Rear wheel drive vehicles
- Body style: Truck
- Related: Bering HD; Bering HDMX

Powertrain
- Engine: Hyundai K-Engine; Hyundai Powertec Engine
- Transmission: Hyundai (manual); ZF (automatic)

Chronology
- Predecessor: Hyundai Super Truck
- Successor: Hyundai Trago; Hyundai Pavise

The Hyundai New Power Truck (hangul:현대 뉴파워트럭) is a line of heavy-duty commercial vehicle by Hyundai Motor Company. The range was primarily available as cargo and dump truck. Its model truck name is 'Hyundai'.

Most heavy-duty truck models are distinguishable by a front 'Hyundai Truck' badge, but the common Hyundai badge is usually used on the rear.

In Japan, Asia-Pacific, Mid-East, Africa, South America, its principal competitors are Daewoo Novus.

== Models ==
Hyundai New Power Truck is a name used by Hyundai Motor Company in commercial vehicle of trucks for two related models. Designed by Hyundai Motor Company and Bering Truck, it was manufactured in Korea at Hyundai Motor Company Jeonju Commercial Vehicle Plant. Manufacture period: 2004.

=== Model name (South Korea) ===
Other different comparison in Hyundai Super Truck

- Gold (all)
- Pro (all)
- Deluxe (8 ton & 15 ton Dump, Mixer)

=== Lineup ===
Cargo

- 8 ton (4x2, long/ultra long/special long)
- 7 ton (4x2, short, chassis cab)
- 8.5 ton (4x2, short/medium)
- 9.5 ton (4x2, short/medium)
- 9.5 ton low (6x4, long/ultra long)
- 11.5 ton (6x4, long)
- 14 ton (6x4, long)
- 15 ton (6x4, medium/long)
- 16 ton (6x4, short/medium/ultra long)
- 16.5 ton (6x4, ultra short)
- 17 ton (6x4, short/medium)
- 19M Full Cargo (6x4, based in 11.5 ton truck)
- 20.5 ton (rear 3 traction 8x4, short)
- 23.5 ton (rear 3 traction 8x4, short)
- 22 ton (rear 3 traction 8x4, economy/hi-power)
- 19 ton (8x4, economy/hi-power)
- 19.5 ton (8x4, economy/hi-power)
- 20.5 ton (8x4, ultra short)
- 25 ton (8x4, ultra short)
- 25 ton (10x4, short/ultra long)

Tractor

- 4x2:380
- 6x2:410/440
- 6x4:380/410/440
- 6x4 Dump & BCT:420/440

Dump & Mixer

- 8 ton (4x2, short)
- 15 ton (6x4, short)
- 23 ton (8x4, short)
- 25 ton (8x4, short)
- 15 ton Mixer (6m^{3}, 6x4, short)

== Technology ==
=== Engine ===
- 4x2 Cargo:290 hp/110 kg·m, 235 hp/70 kg·m
- 6x4 Cargo Low:290 hp/110 kg·m
- 6x4 Cargo:380 hp/160 kg·m, 410 hp/188 kg·m(Powertec)
- Rear 3 Traction 8x4 Cargo:380 hp/160 kg·m, 410 hp/188 kg·m(Powertec)
- 8x4 Cargo:380 hp/160 kg·m, 410 hp/188 kg·m(Powertec), 440 hp/206 kg·m(Powertec)
- 10x4 Cargo:440 hp/206 kg·m(Powertec)
- 4x2 Tractor:380/148 kg·m
- 6x2 Tractor:410/188 kg·m, 440/206 kg·m(Powertec)
- 6x4 Tractor:380/160 kg·m, 410/188 kg·m(Powertec), 440/206 kg·m(Powertec)
- 6x4 Dump & BCT Tractor:410/188 kg·m(Powertec), 440/206 kg·m(Powertec)
- 4x2 Dump:290/110 kg·m
- 6x4 Dump:380/160 kg·m
- 8x4 Dump:380/160 kg·m, 440/206 kg·m(Powertec)
- 6x4 Mixer:380/160 kg·m

=== Transmission ===
- 4x2 Cargo:forward 6/reverse 1
- 6x4 Cargo:Hyundai-forward 6/reverse 1, ZF-forward 16/reverse 2
- Rear 3 Traction 8x4 Cargo (ZF only):forward 16/reverse 2
- 8x4 Cargo:Hyundai-forward 10/reverse 2, ZF-forward 16/reverse 2
- 10x4 Cargo (ZF only):forward 16/reverse 2
- 4x2 Tractor:forward 10/reverse 2
- 6x2 Tractor:forward 10/reverse 2
- 6x4 Tractor (ZF only):forward 16/reverse 2
- 6x4 Dump & BCT Tractor (ZF only):forward 16/reverse 2
- 4x2 Dump:forward 6/reverse 1
- 6x4 Dump:forward 6/reverse 1
- 8x4 Dump (ZF only):forward 16/reverse 2
- 6x4 Mixer:forward 6/reverse 1
