= Tata Novus =

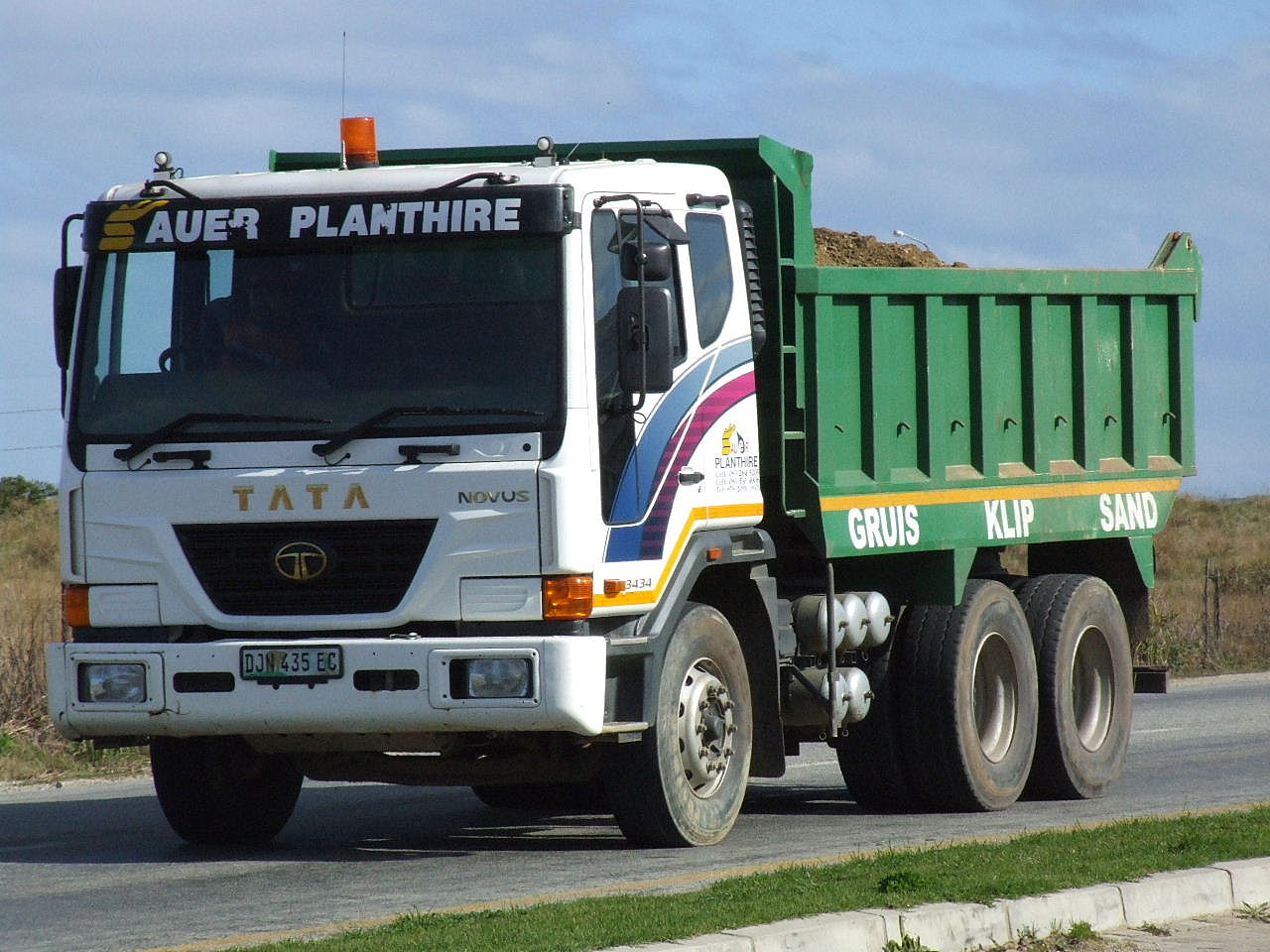

Overview
- Manufacturer: Tata Motors
- Also called: Tata Daewoo Novus
- Production: 2005–2011; 2012–present (Novus SE; global)
- Assembly: Gunsan, South Korea

Body and chassis
- Class: Truck
- Body style: 2-door truck

Powertrain
- Engine: 8.3L Cummins, 7.6L & 11.1L HD Hyundai
- Transmission: 12-speed manual, 16-speed manual

The Tata Novus is Tata Motors' first new offering from its acquisition of Daewoo's truck manufacturing unit. The Novus is based on the Daewoo Novus truck available in South Korea. It was launched in December 2005. Tata Motors became the first Indian manufacturer to introduce 300 horsepower (220 kW) heavy commercial vehicles.

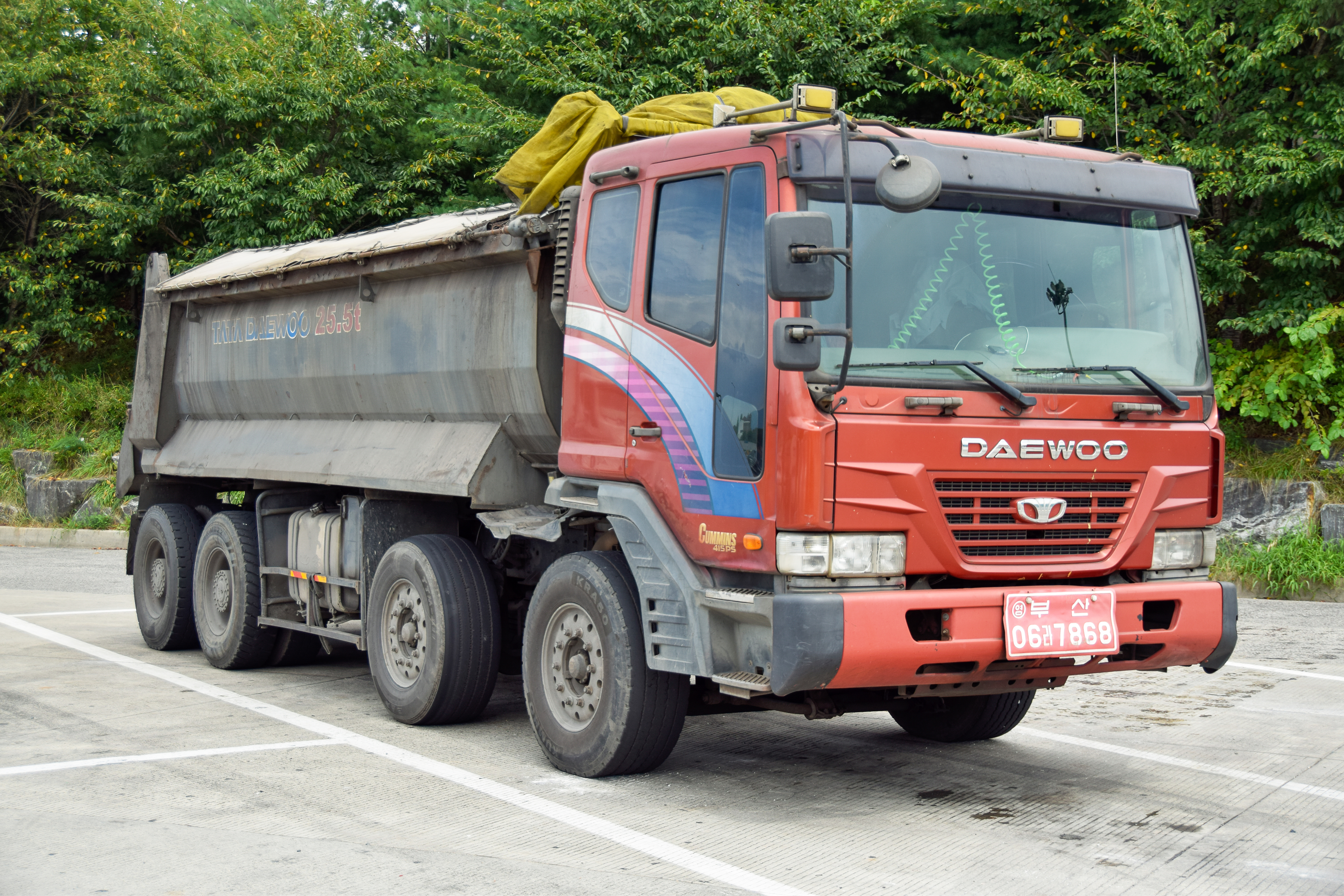
A Daewoo Novus 8x4 in South Korea

The Novus is powered by a Cummins C8.3-300 engine that's Bharat Stage III compliant. It comes with a fully synchronised gearbox with 10 forward gears and 2 reverse gears. Korean variants however use the Cummins ISM 440 or the IVECO FPT Cursor 11 420 for newer models.
