= Inster =

Inster may refer to

- The German name of the Russian river Instruch
- The Hyundai Inster, also called Hyundai Casper Electric, a small electric car
