= Gwangju Global Motors =

Gwangju Global Motors Co. Ltd.
- Native name: 광주글로벌모터스
- Type: Joint venture
- Industry: Automotive
- Founded: 2019
- Headquarters: Gwangju, South Korea
- Key people: Yoon, Mong-hyun (CEO)
- Owner: Gwangju Metropolitan Government (21%); Hyundai Motor Company (19%)
- Website: www.ggmotors.com

Gwangju Global Motors Co. Ltd. (GGM) is a joint venture manufacturing plant between Hyundai Motor Company and the Gwangju city government. Opened in 2021, it is the first new automobile manufacturing plant in South Korea since 1998.

== History ==
The first model produced by the plant, the Hyundai Casper rolled off of GGM’s production line in September 2021. The plant has the capacity to produce 70,000 vehicles a year. It was the only Hyundai-operated manufacturing plant in South Korea without the presence of workers unions, enabling average annual pay to be less than half than other Hyundai plants. It was part of an initiative by President Moon Jae-in to increase jobs by negotiating lower wages through local governments. Moon received his own personal Casper from GGM in October 2021.

In May 2024, some of the employees joined the Korean Metal Workers' Union. Their first partial strike was in January 2025, which drew the concern of creditor banks. There was controversy surrounding the relation of strikes to repayment schedules. In April 2025, the Inster, a rebranded Casper EV for overseas markets, began deliveries to Japan. In January 2026, the Jeonnam Regional Labor Relations Commission recognized that GGM had engaged in unfair labor practices in relation to the union.

== Ownership ==
Gwangju Metropolitan Government is the largest shareholder with an investment of 48.3 billion won (21 percent stake). Hyundai Motor Company, which invested 43.7 billion won, is the second-largest shareholder (19 percent). Of the total project cost of 575.4 billion won, the remaining 60% (345.4 billion won) excluding equity capital of 230 billion won was drawn up from the financial sector.

== Current models ==
- Hyundai Casper (2021–present)
- Hyundai Casper Electric / Inster (2024–present)
