= Hyundai Casper =

Crossover city car produced by Hyundai

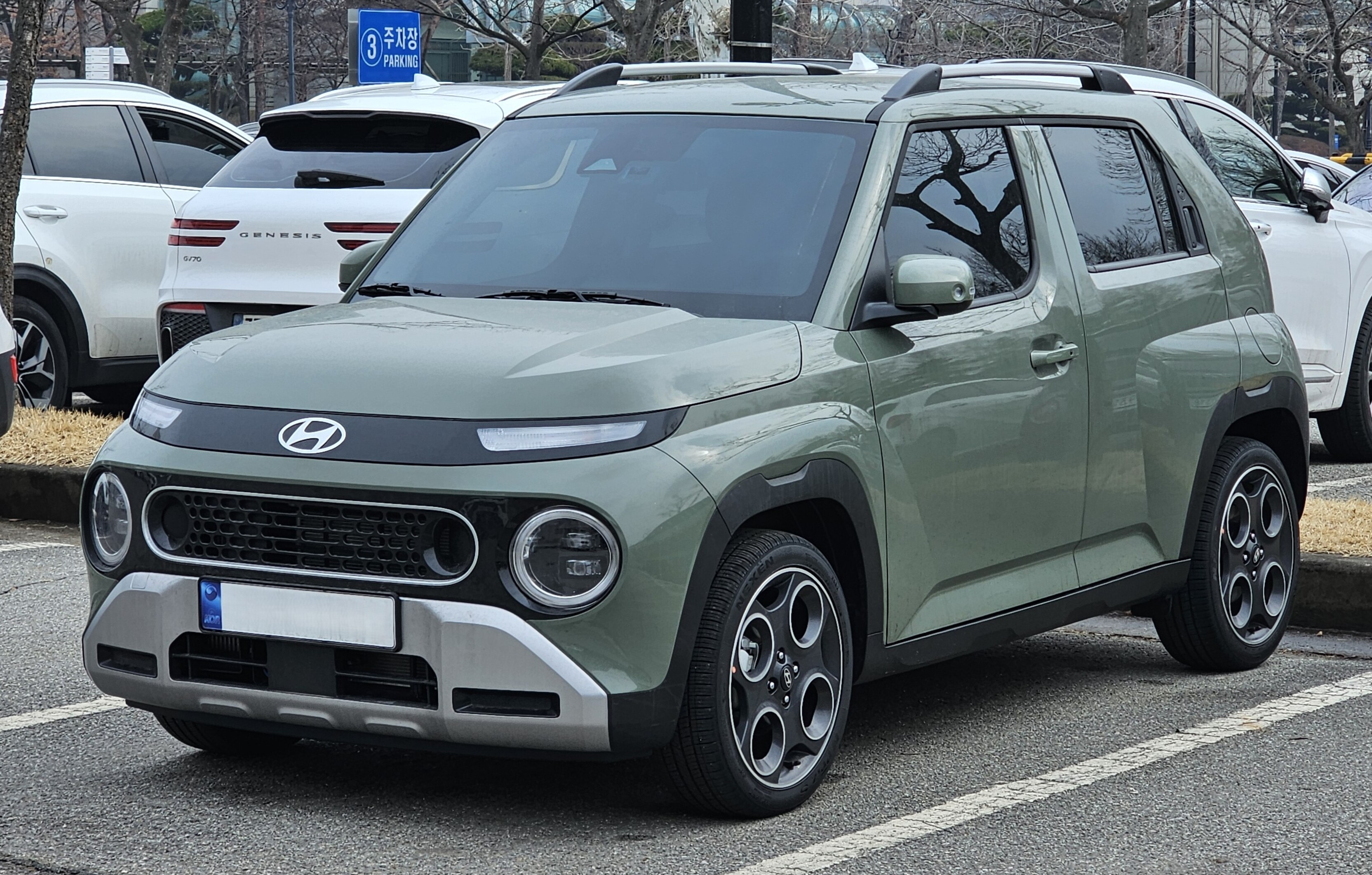
- Hyundai Casper Active (facelift)

Overview
- Manufacturer: Hyundai
- Model code: AX1
- Production: 2021–present
- Assembly: South Korea: Gwangju (GGM)

Body and chassis
- Class: Crossover city car (A)
- Body style: 5-door hatchback; 5-door panel van (Casper Van)
- Layout: Front-engine, front-wheel-drive
- Platform: Hyundai-Kia K1
- Related: Hyundai Inster / Casper Electric; Kia Picanto (JA); Kia Ray

Powertrain
- Engine: Petrol: 1.0 L Smartstream G1.0 MPi I3; 1.0 L Kappa II T-GDi I3
- Transmission: 4-speed automatic

Dimensions
- Wheelbase: 2,400 mm (94.5 in)
- Length: 3,595 mm (141.5 in)
- Width: 1,595 mm (62.8 in)
- Height: 1,575–1,605 mm (62.0–63.2 in)
- Curb weight: 985–1,060 kg (2,172–2,337 lb)

The Hyundai Casper (Korean: 현대 캐스퍼) is an (A-segment) crossover city car produced by the South Korean automobile manufacturer Hyundai since 2021.

It is the smallest crossover SUV ever offered by the brand, and also the smallest automobile of any kind sold by Hyundai.

The Casper was developed to comply with South Korea's "light car" (Korean: 경차, romanized: Gyeongcha) category, which offers tax incentives for vehicles with exterior dimensions below 3,600 mm (141.7 in) in length and 1,600 mm (63.0 in) in width. It is the first Hyundai vehicle to occupy the segment since the Atos.

A battery electric derivative, the Casper Electric (marketed abroad as the Hyundai Inster), was introduced in mid-2024.

== History ==
The Casper was revealed through a set of images on 1 September 2021. Pre-orders opened on 15 September 2021, and the vehicle went on sale on 29 September. According to Hyundai, the name "Casper" is taken from the Casper skateboarding technique. Hyundai confirmed the Casper would be offered with advanced driver-assistance systems across three trim lines: Smart, Modern, and Inspiration.

The Casper Van was officially released on 3 February 2022, offering a loading capacity of 940 litres with the second-row seating removed. Hot stamping, a lightweight construction method, was applied to key structural areas to reduce body deformation in a collision, increasing torsional rigidity and average tensile strength through the resulting high-strength lightweight body.

== Design ==
The front fascia features turn signal lights at the top and circular LED daytime running lights at the bottom. The rear door handle is a hidden design integrated near the window glass, while the parametric pattern of the front grille is echoed in the rear lamp design. Circular turn signal lights are used front and rear. The rear seat is formed from two individual seats positioned side by side.

The Casper uses a pedal-type parking brake. Safety technologies available include forward collision prevention assistance, lane departure prevention assistance, and lane maintenance assistance.

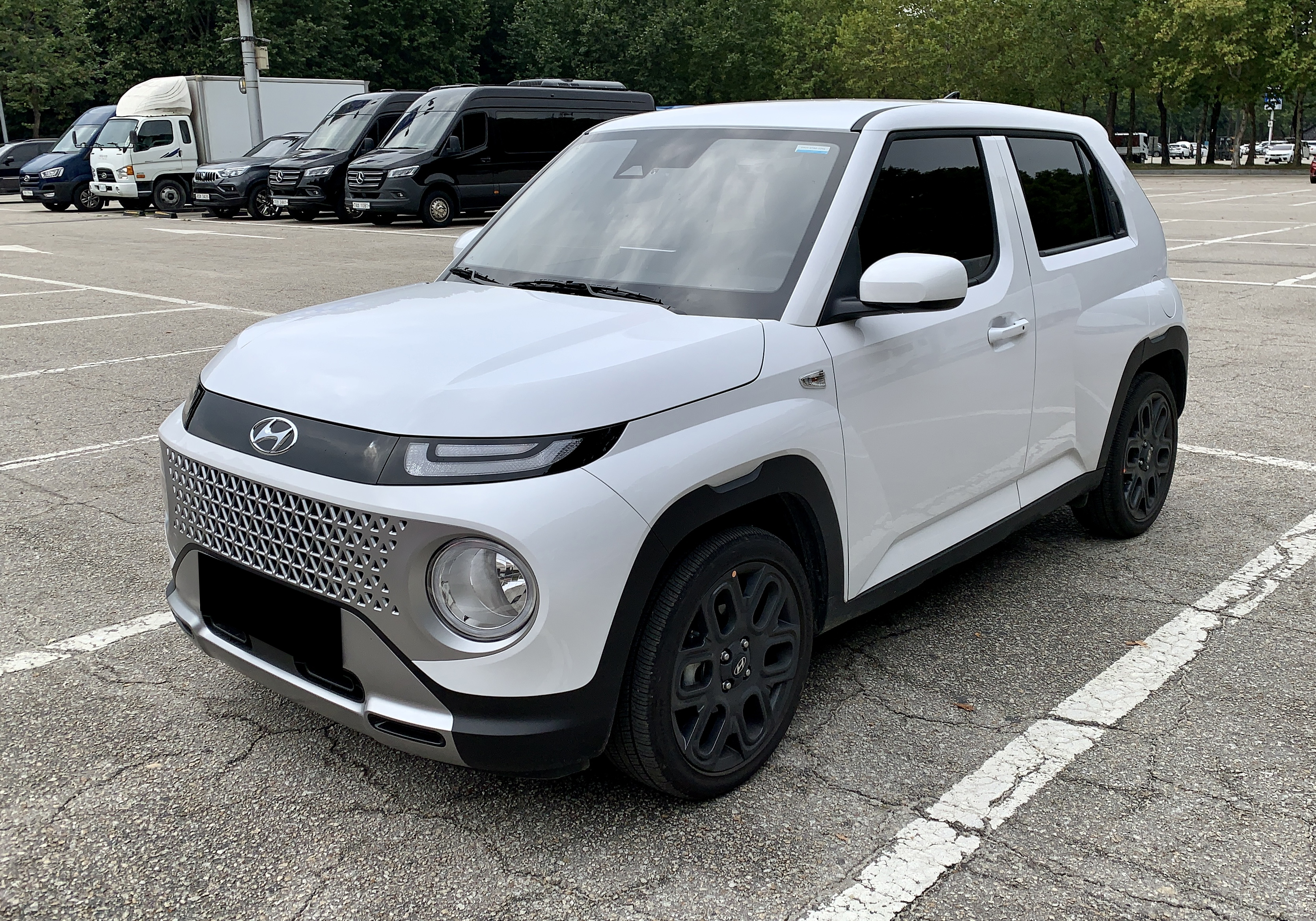
Front view

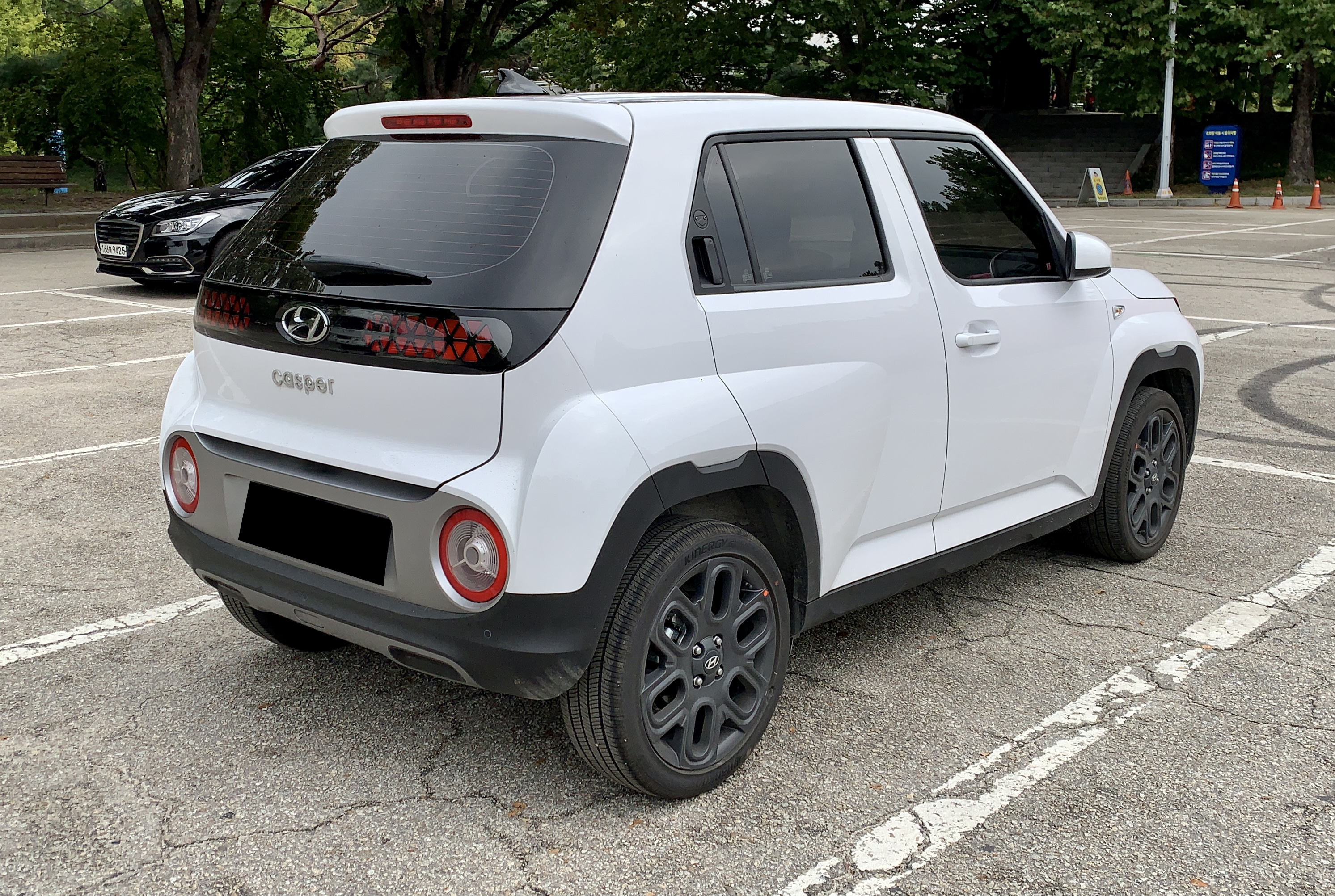
Rear view

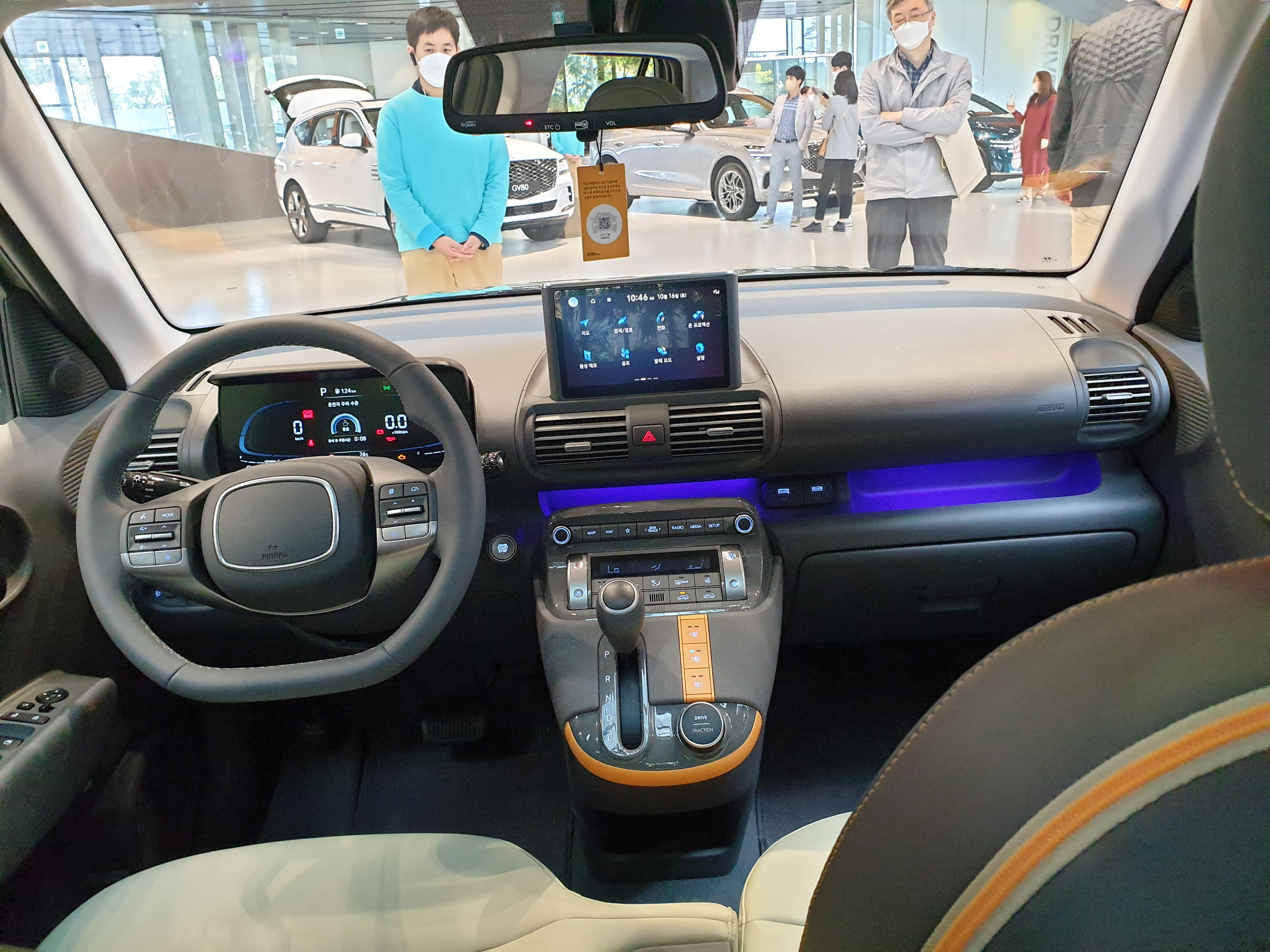
Interior

== 2024 facelift ==
A facelifted Casper was officially revealed on 16 August 2024, with online contract reservations opening at 8:30 a.m. on 18 October 2024.

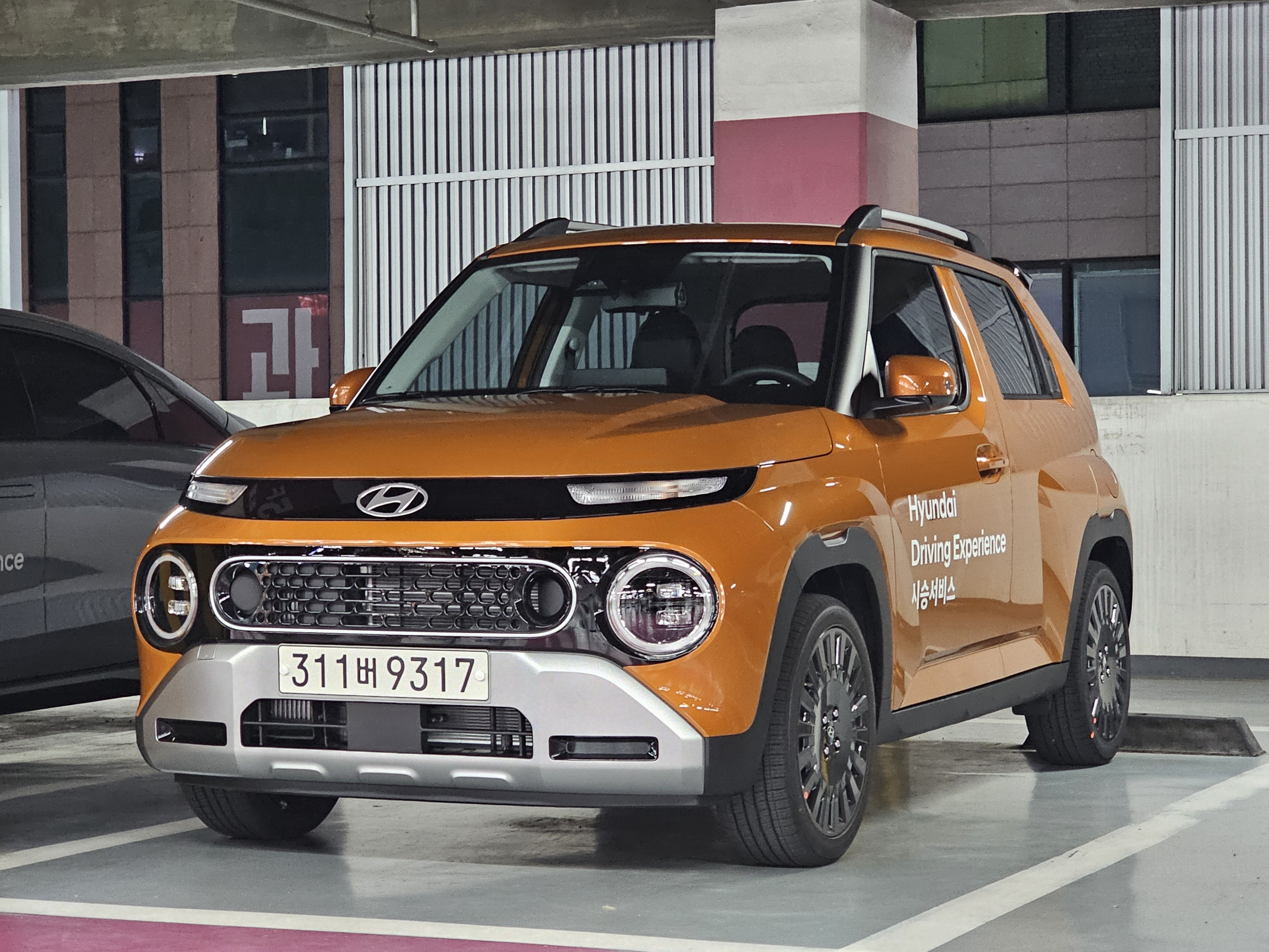
Front view (facelift)

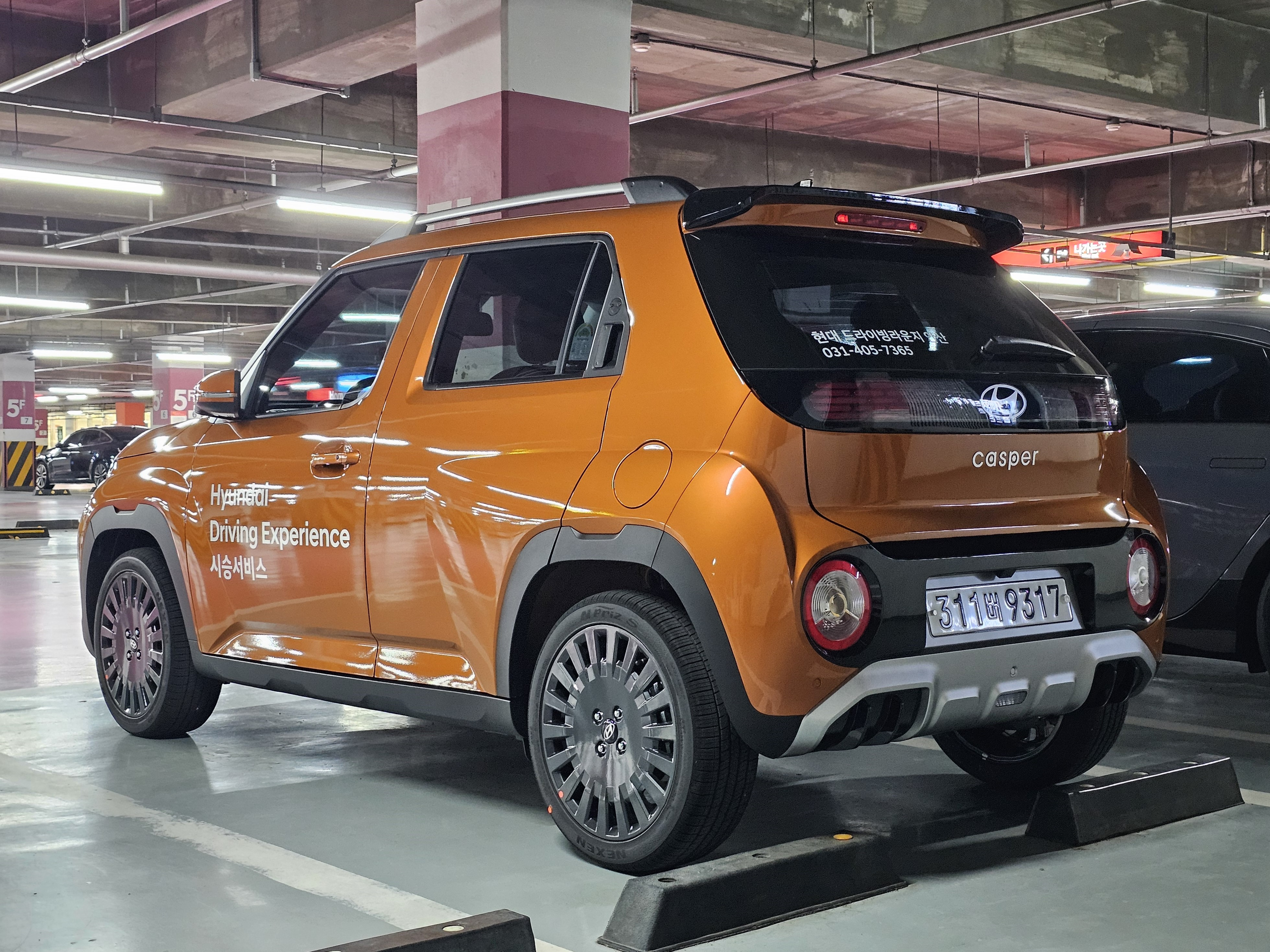
Rear view (facelift)

== Powertrain ==
The Smartstream G1.0 petrol engine is based on the existing 56 kW (76 PS; 75 hp) naturally aspirated engine.

Engines
Model	Transmission	Power	Torque
Smartstream G1.0 MPi	4-speed automatic	56 kW (76 PS; 75 hp) @ 6,200 rpm	95 N⋅m (70 lbf⋅ft) @ 3,750 rpm
Kappa 1.0 T-GDi	4-speed automatic	74 kW (99 hp) @ 4,500–6,000 rpm	172 N⋅m (127 lbf⋅ft) @ 1,500–4,000 rpm

== Sales ==
Year	South Korea
2021	10,806
2022	48,002
2023	41,430
2024	41,788

== See also ==
- Hyundai Inster
- List of Hyundai vehicles
