= Hyundai Inster =

Battery electric crossover city car

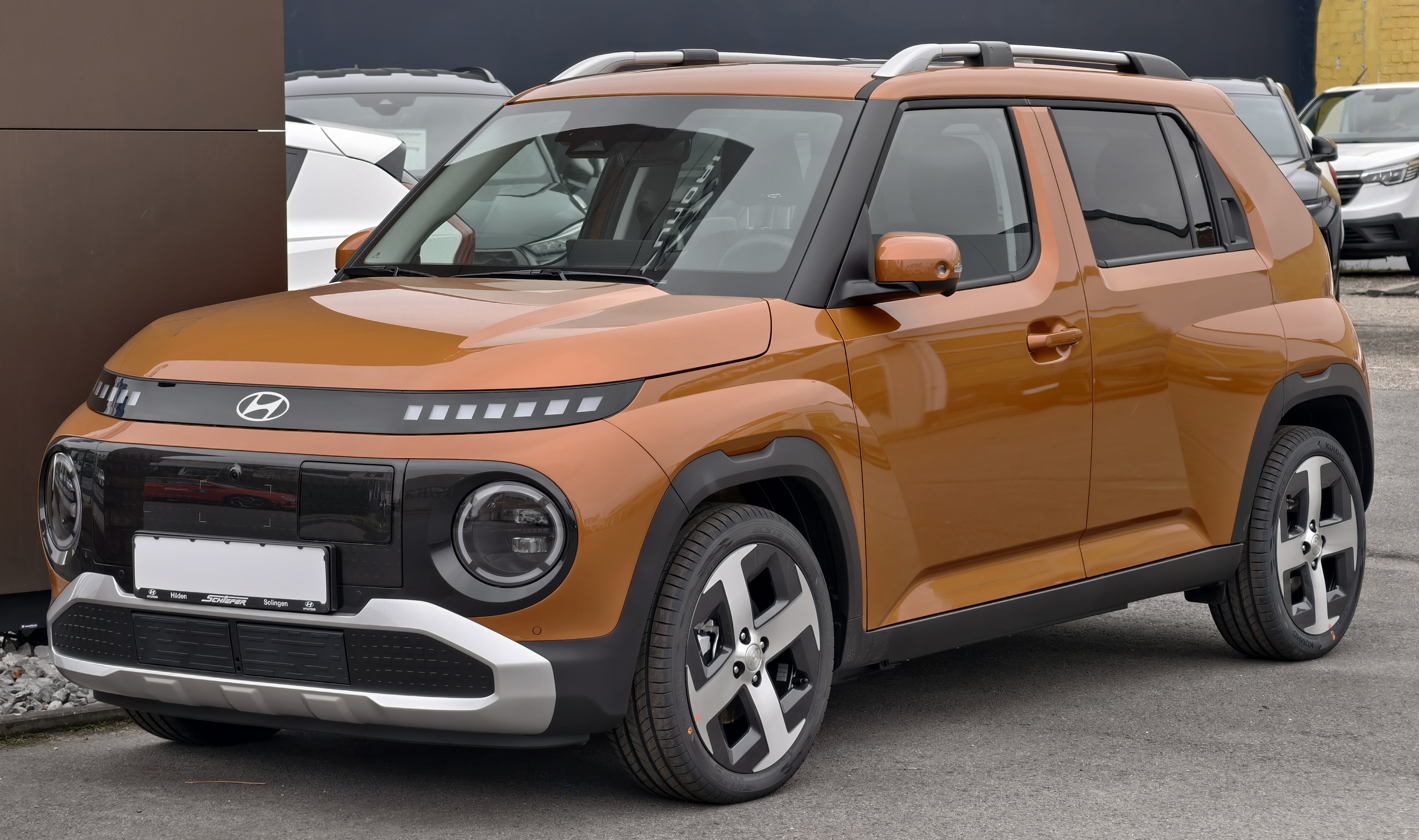
- Hyundai Inster Prime (Europe)

Overview
- Manufacturer: Hyundai
- Model code: AX1 EV
- Also called: Hyundai Casper Electric (South Korea)
- Production: 2024–present
- Assembly: South Korea: Gwangju (GGM)

Body and chassis
- Class: Crossover city car (A)
- Body style: 5-door hatchback
- Layout: Front-motor, front-wheel-drive
- Platform: Hyundai-Kia K1 BEV
- Related: Hyundai Casper

Powertrain
- Electric motor: Front-mounted permanent magnet synchronous motor (BorgWarner)
- Power output: 71.1 kW (97 PS; 95 hp) (Standard Range); 84.5 kW (115 PS; 113 hp) (Long Range)
- Battery: 42 kWh LGES NMC lithium-ion; 49 kWh LGES NMC lithium-ion
- Electric range: 300–355 km (186–221 mi) (WLTP)
- Plug-in charging: 11 kW (AC); 120 kW (DC)

Dimensions
- Wheelbase: 2,580 mm (101.6 in)
- Length: 3,825 mm (150.6 in)
- Width: 1,610 mm (63.4 in)
- Height: 1,575–1,605 mm (62.0–63.2 in)
- Curb weight: 1,335–1,355 kg (2,943–2,987 lb)

The Hyundai Inster is a battery electric (A-segment) crossover city car produced by Hyundai since 2024.

Marketed in Europe, Australia, Japan, and Taiwan, it is also known as the Hyundai Casper Electric in its native country, South Korea.

It is derived from the gas-powered Casper and is lengthened and adapted on Hyundai's dedicated K1 BEV platform.

== History ==
On 27 June 2024, Hyundai first introduced the model at the Busan International Mobility Show. According to Hyundai, the name Inster is a portmanteau of "intimate" and "innovative".

In Europe, the Inster is positioned between the A-SUV and B-SUV segments.

From early 2025, Hyundai planned to market the vehicle in Japan and Australia, though no plans have been announced for North America.

== Design ==
Compared to the gas-powered Casper, Hyundai extended the length and wheelbase of the Casper Electric/Inster by 230 and 180 mm (9.1 and 7.1 in) respectively, and the width also grew by 15 mm (0.6 in).

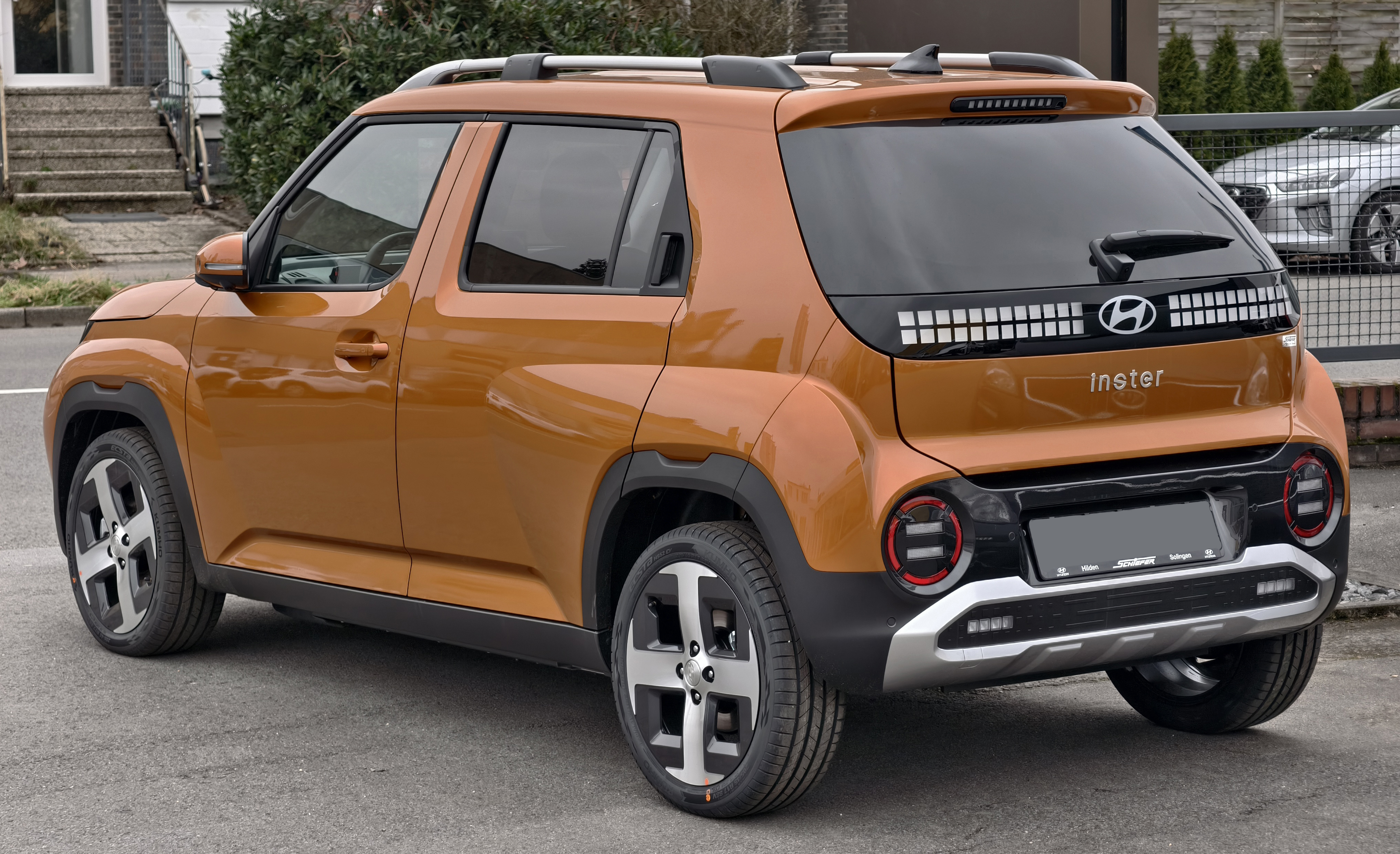
Rear view

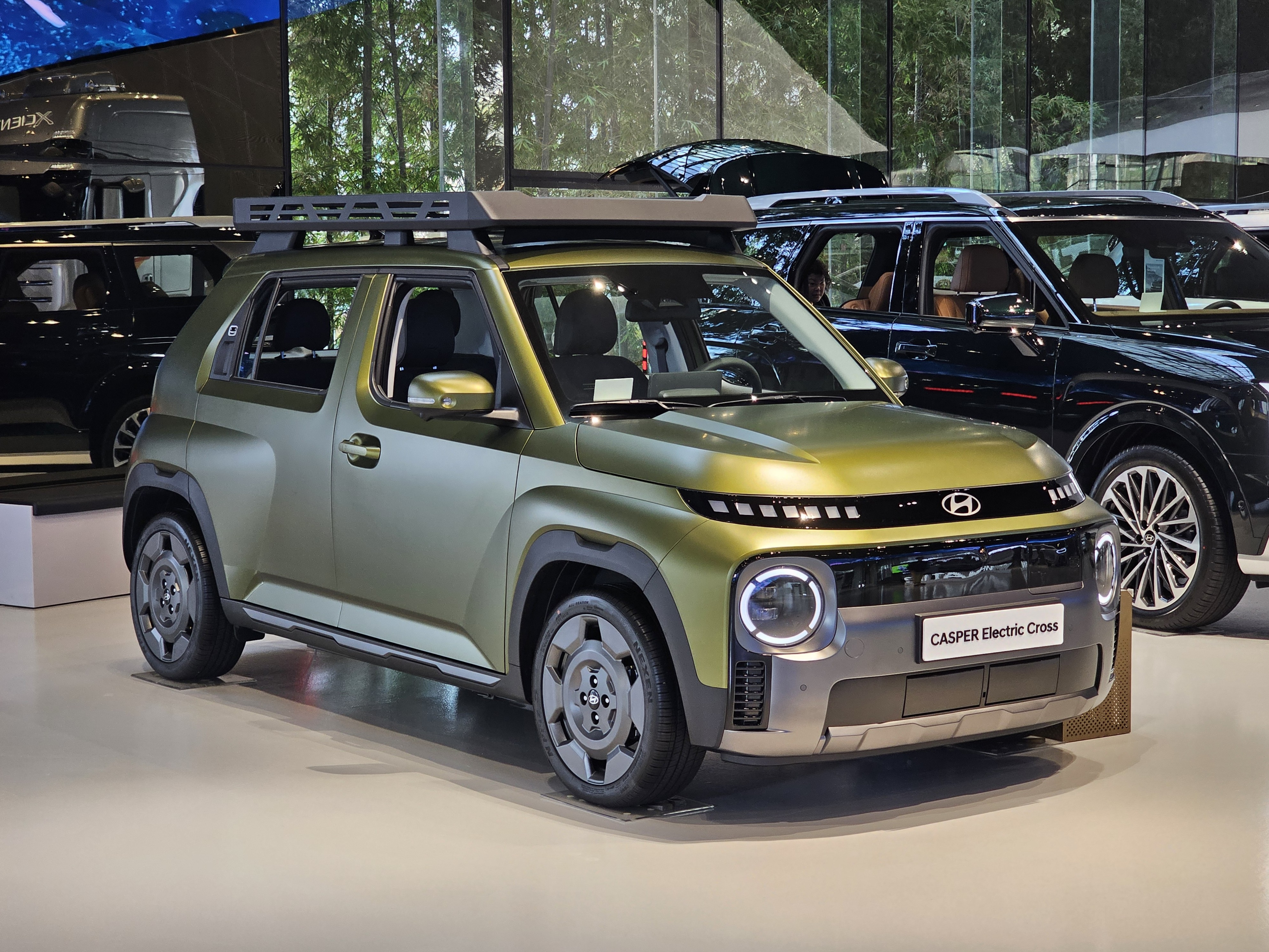
Casper Electric Cross (South Korea)

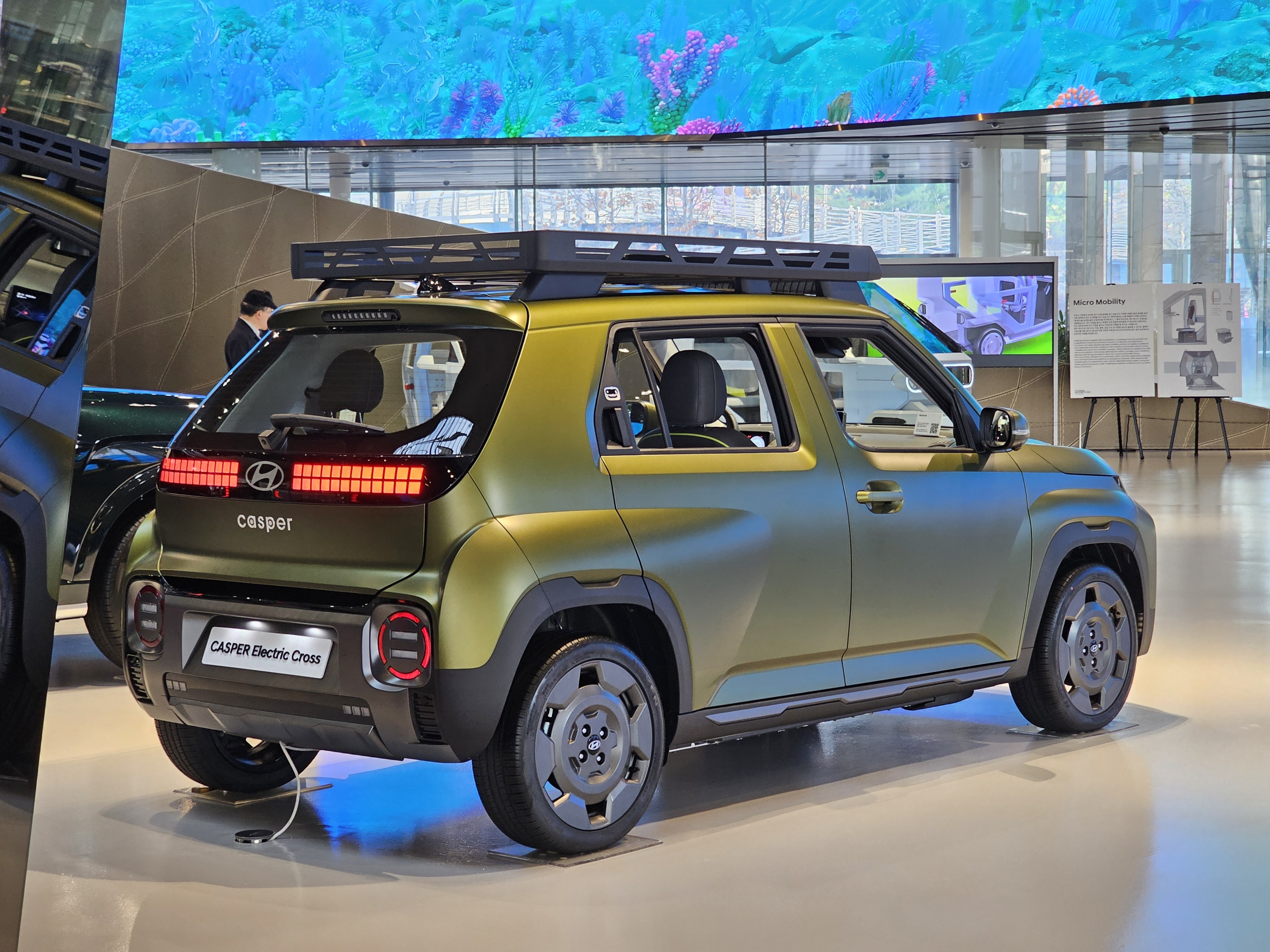
Rear view (Casper Electric Cross)

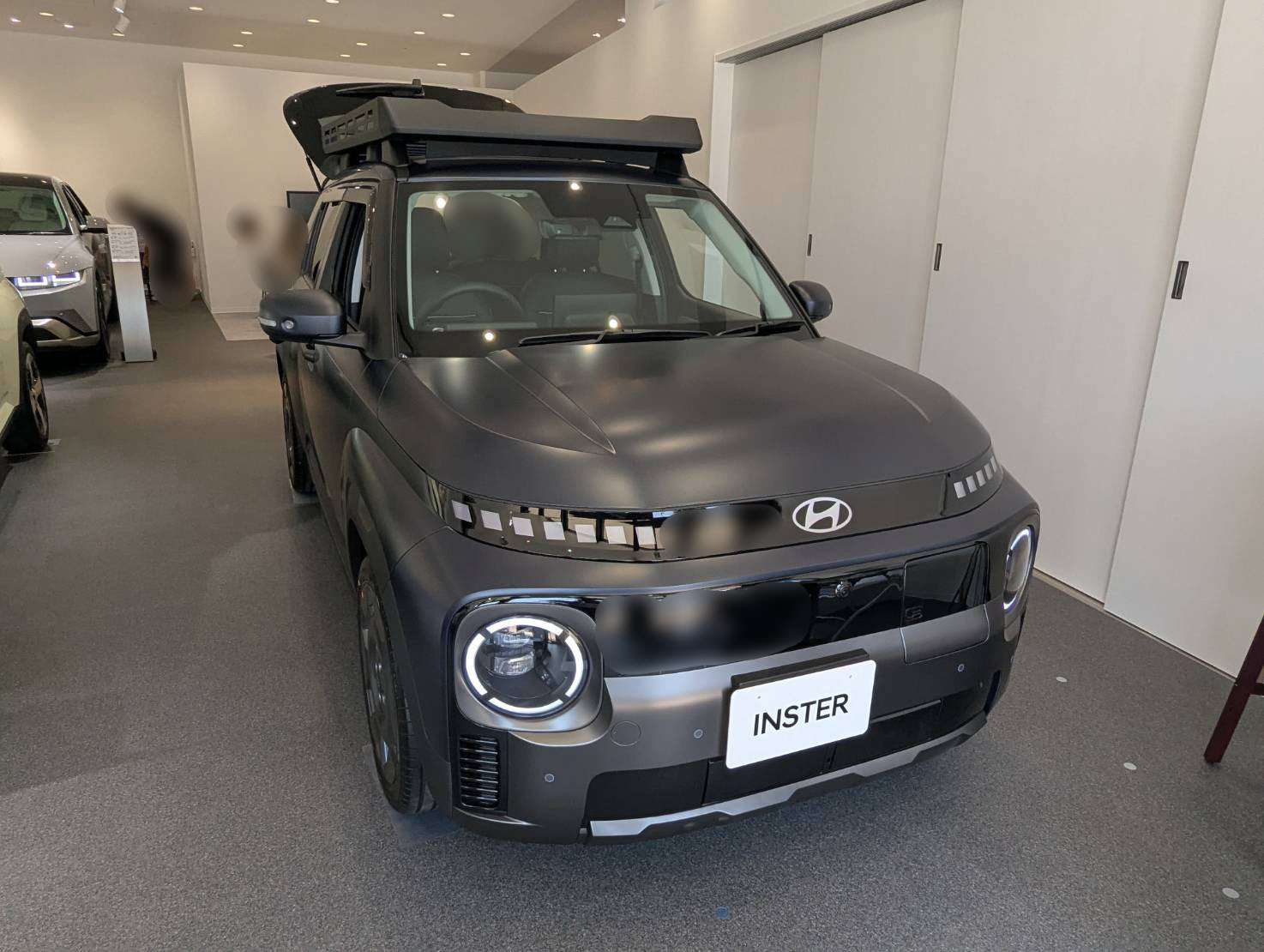
Inster Cross (Japan)

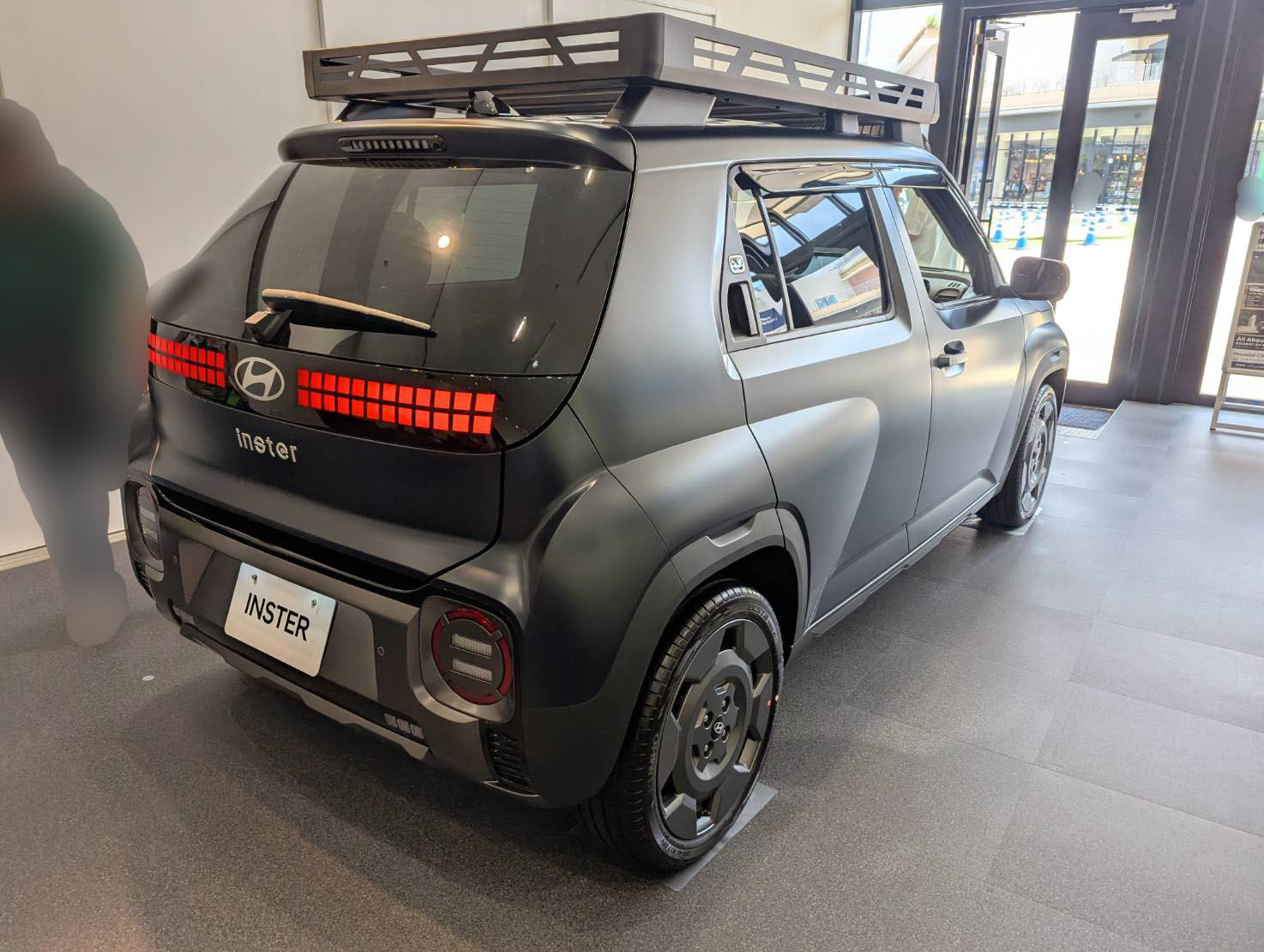
Rear view (Inster Cross)

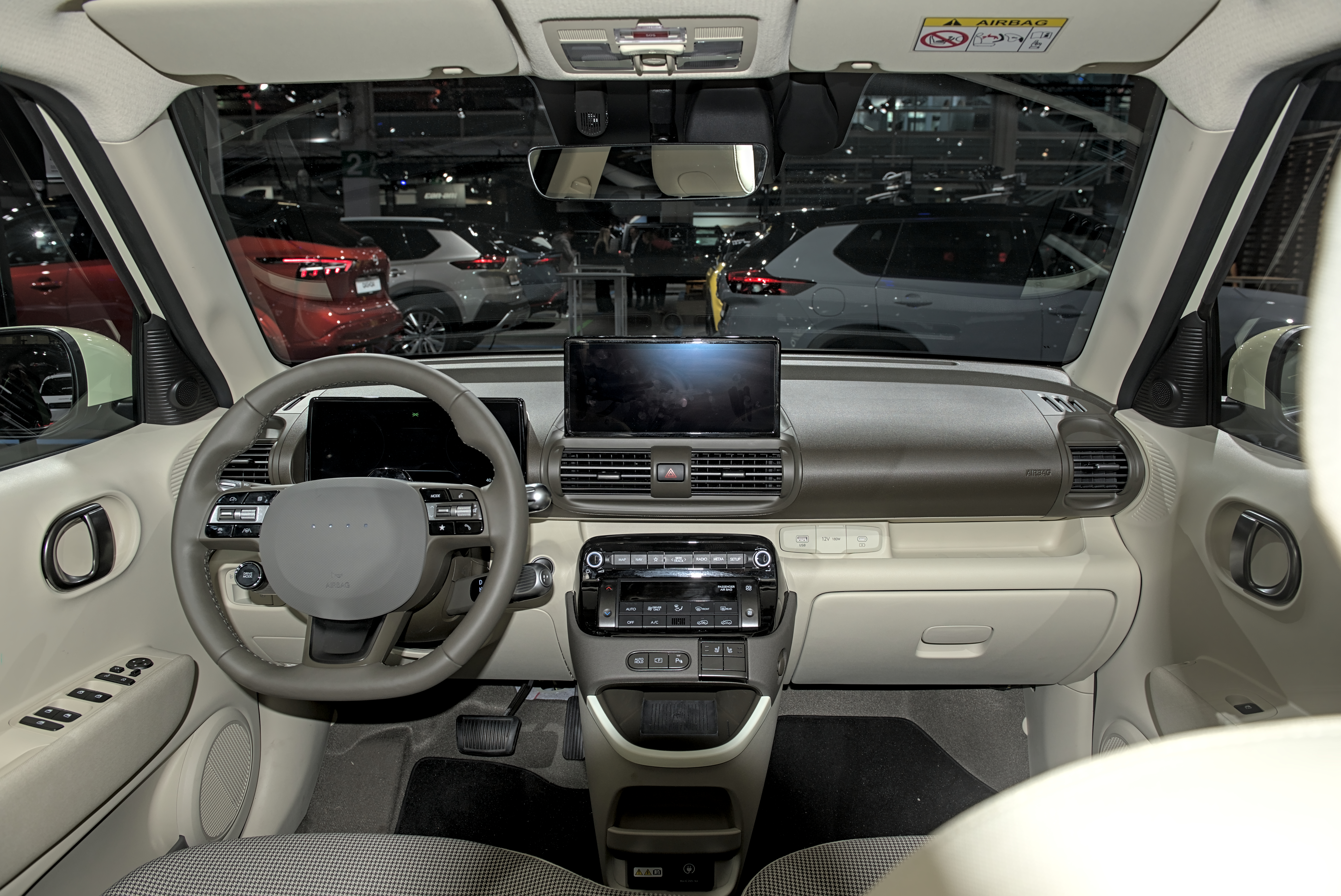
Interior

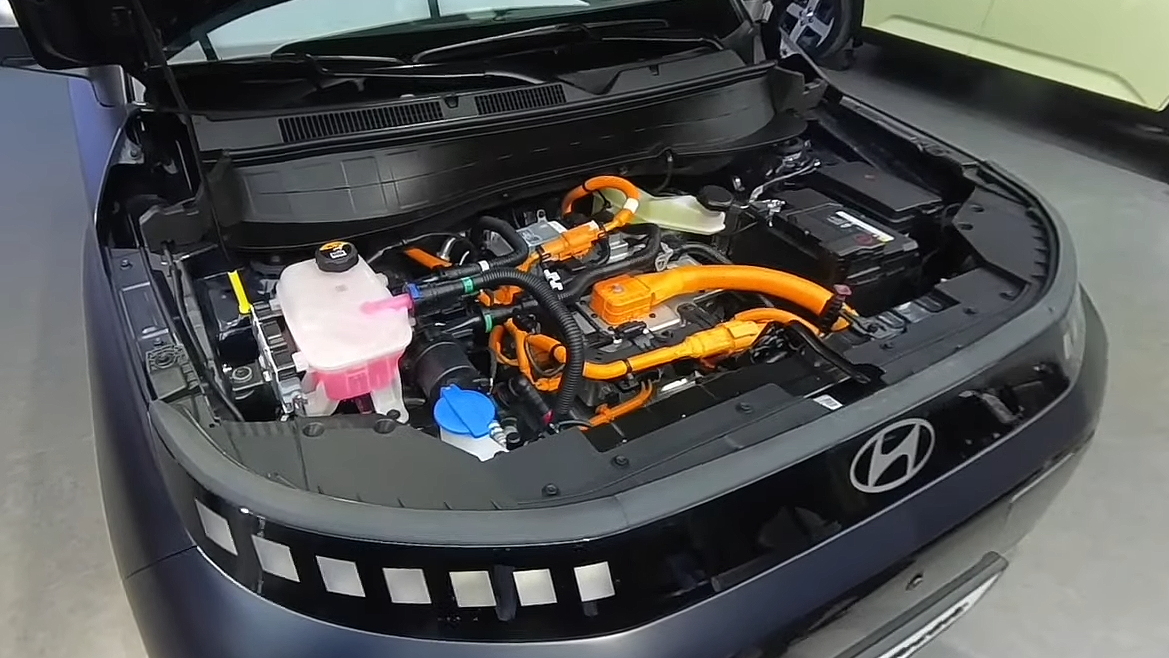
Powertrain

== Hyundai Insteroid concept ==
The Hyundai INSTEROID is a gaming-inspired electric concept car based on the Hyundai INSTER subcompact electric vehicle. Unveiled in Seoul in April 2025, it was created by Hyundai Motor’s European design team as a non-production design study exploring sporty styling, customization, and video-game-inspired user experiences. The INSTEROID features an extended and widened body, track-optimized wheels, a prominent rear wing, diffuser, and wheel-arch air vents intended to improve aerodynamics. Its stripped-down cockpit includes bucket seats, a roll cage, and a specialized, fully adjustable instrument cluster. The interior uses 3D-knit fabric made from recycled yarn, while the exterior is finished in soft white with a bold orange highlight. Hyundai also equipped the concept with a “Drift Mode,” an integrated Beat House sound system, and a Message Grid interface. The INSTEROID was not intended for production, but was designed to demonstrate Hyundai’s creative direction and connect with gaming-oriented audiences.

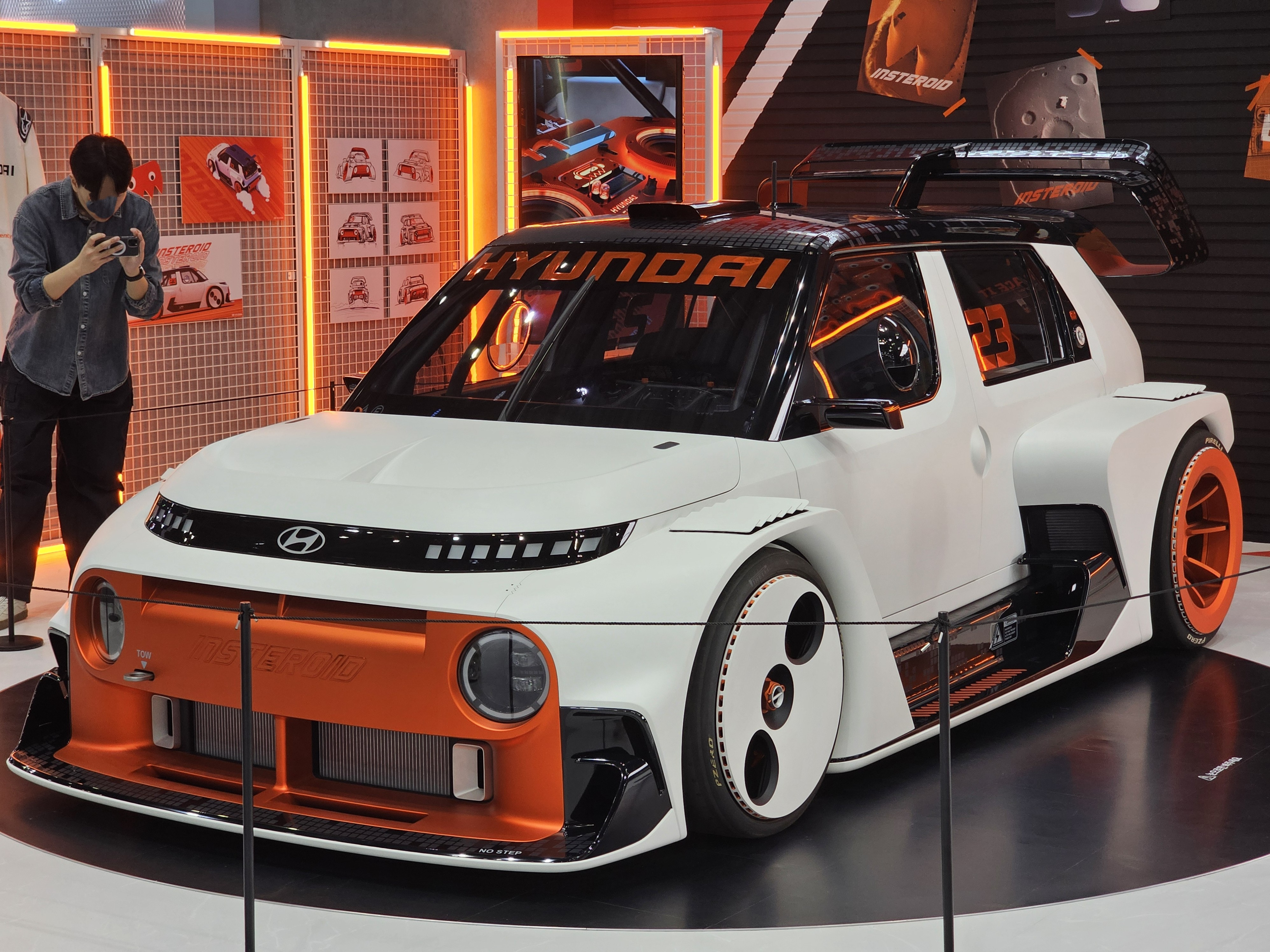
Insteroid Concept

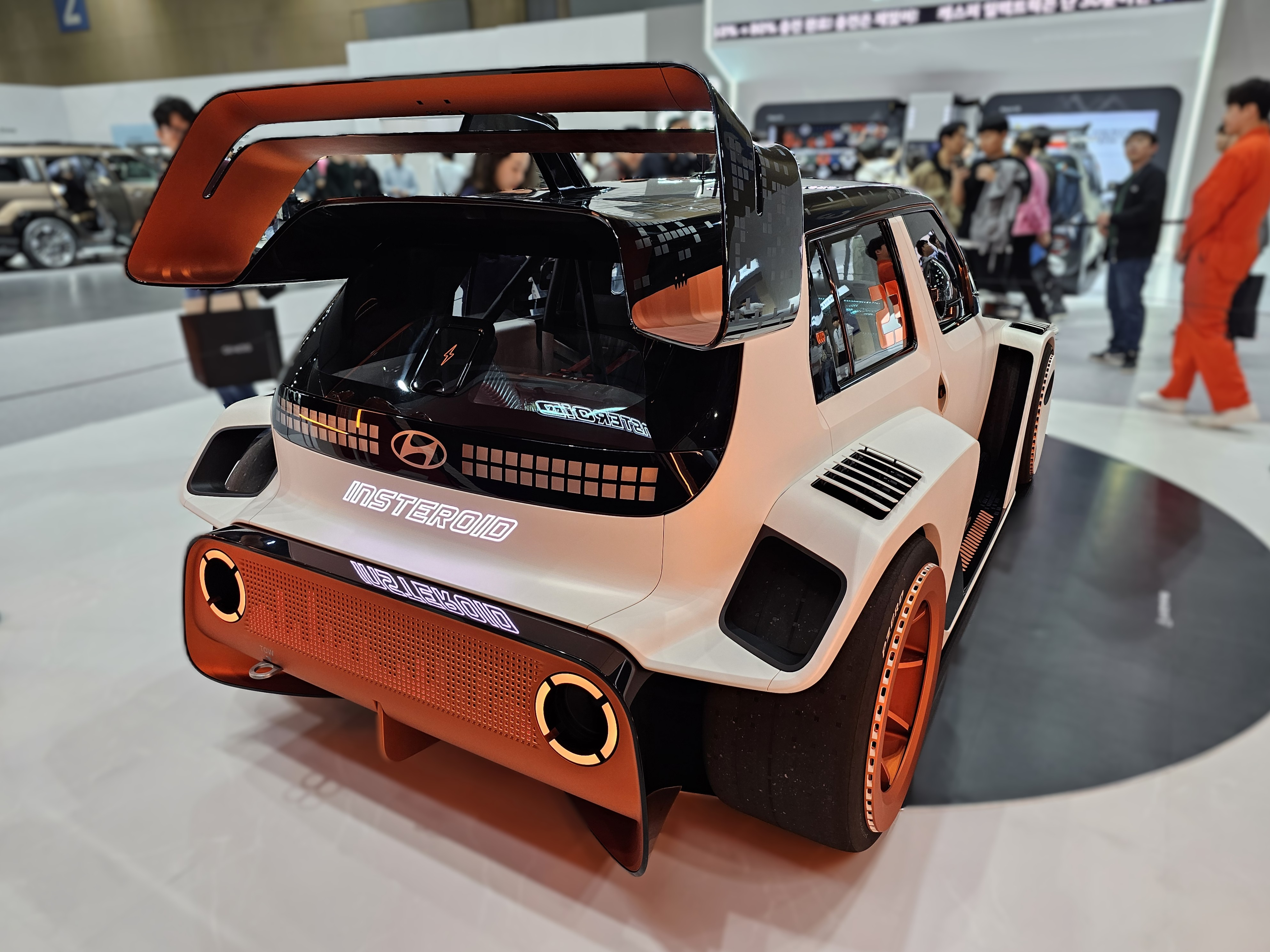
Rear view (Insteroid Concept)

== Powertrain ==
The integrated drive module used by the Casper Electric/Inster is sourced from BorgWarner. Maximum outputs are 71.1 kW (97 PS; 95 hp) and 147 N⋅m (108 lb⋅ft) for the front-mounted traction motor on the Standard Range model, and 84.5 kW (115 PS; 113 hp) with the same torque figure on the Long Range model.

Standard and Long Range variants use 42 kWh and 49 kWh batteries respectively. Although early reports suggested lithium iron phosphate (LFP) chemistry would be used, Hyundai confirmed at launch that both packs use lithium nickel manganese cobalt (NMC) cells instead. Under WLTP testing, claimed electric range is 300 km (186 mi) and 355 km (221 mi) respectively. The onboard charger accepts AC power at up to 11 kW, while DC fast charging is supported at up to 120 kW, at which rate either battery can recharge from 10 to 80 percent in 30 minutes.

Specifications
Battery	Years	Power	Torque	0–100 km/h (0–62 mph) (official)	Top speed	Range (claimed)
42 kWh (Standard Range)	2024–present	71.1 kW (97 PS; 95 hp)	147 N⋅m (108 lb⋅ft)	11.7 s	140 km/h (87 mph)	300 km (186 mi) (WLTP)
49 kWh (Long Range)	2024–present	84.5 kW (115 PS; 113 hp)	147 N⋅m (108 lb⋅ft)	10.6 s	150 km/h (93 mph)	355 km (221 mi) (WLTP); 315 km (196 mi) (South Korea)

== Markets ==
=== Australia ===
The Inster was launched in Australia on 16 April 2025, available in three variants: Standard Range (42 kWh), Extended Range (49 kWh), and Cross.

=== Europe ===
The Inster debuted in Europe in January 2025 at the 2025 Brussels Motor Show. European sales totalled 450 units in 2024. In 2025, sales totaled 10,091 units in Germany alone.

=== Japan ===
On 8 November 2024, Hyundai Mobility Japan announced the launch of the Inster in the spring of 2025. The Inster was unveiled at the 2025 Tokyo Auto Salon in three variants: Casual, Active, and Lounge. The Inster Cross was launched in Japan on 8 August 2025.

=== Taiwan ===
The Inster was launched in Taiwan on 6 November 2025, with three variants: EV400-A (42 kWh), EV400-B (42 kWh), and EV450 (49 kWh).

== Safety ==
=== Euro NCAP ===
Euro NCAP test results Hyundai Inster (2025)
Test	Points	%
Overall:	4 /5 stars	
Adult occupant:	28.3	70%
Child occupant:	40.1	81%
Pedestrian:	44.2	70%
Safety assist:	12.1	67%

=== ANCAP ===
ANCAP test results Hyundai Inster (2025, aligned with Euro NCAP)
Test	Points	%
Overall:	4 /5 stars	
Adult occupant:	27.33	70%
Child occupant:	41.10	83%
Pedestrian:	44.24	70%
Safety assist:	12.58	69%

== Awards ==
- World Electric Car of the Year — 2025 World Car Awards

== See also ==
- Hyundai Casper
- List of Hyundai vehicles
