= Hyundai Creta =

Subcompact crossover SUV

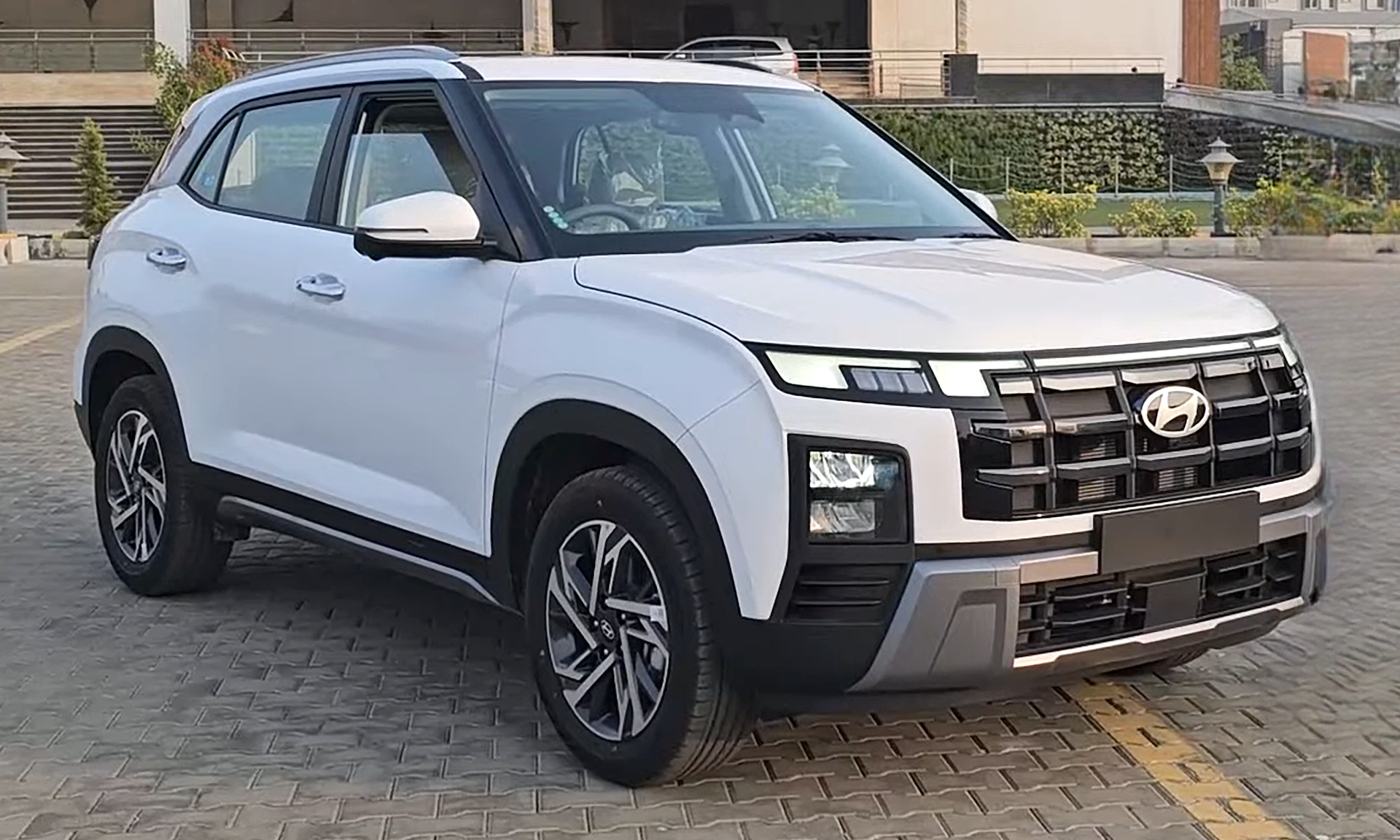
- Hyundai Creta (SU2)

Overview
- Manufacturer: Hyundai
- Also called: Hyundai ix25; Hyundai Cantus
- Production: 2014–present

Body and chassis
- Class: Subcompact crossover SUV (B)
- Body style: 5-door SUV
- Layout: Front-engine, front-wheel-drive or all-wheel-drive
- Related: Hyundai Alcazar Kia Seltos Hyundai Venue

The Hyundai Creta is a subcompact crossover SUV produced by Hyundai since 2014 mainly for emerging markets, particularly BRICS. It is positioned above the Venue and below the Alcazar in Hyundai's SUV line-up.

The first-generation model debuted as a near-production concept car in China in April 2014, while the second generation was first introduced in 2019. The second-generation model was also available in a longer derivative with three-row seating, which is known as the Hyundai Alcazar, Creta Grand or Grand Creta. The vehicle has been manufactured in China, India, Russia, Brazil, and Indonesia. For developed markets like South Korea, the United States, Canada, Europe, Singapore and Australia, the Creta is not offered in favour of the more advanced Kona.

The model was named after the Crete island in Greece. The name is also intended to suggest connections with "creative". In the Dominican Republic, it is sold as the Hyundai Cantus. In China, it was sold as the Hyundai ix25.

The Creta was the best-selling SUV in Russia from 2017 until 2021. It is also the highest-selling SUV in India since 2020, and the third best-selling Hyundai model globally since 2019.

== First generation (GS/GC; 2014) ==
First generation
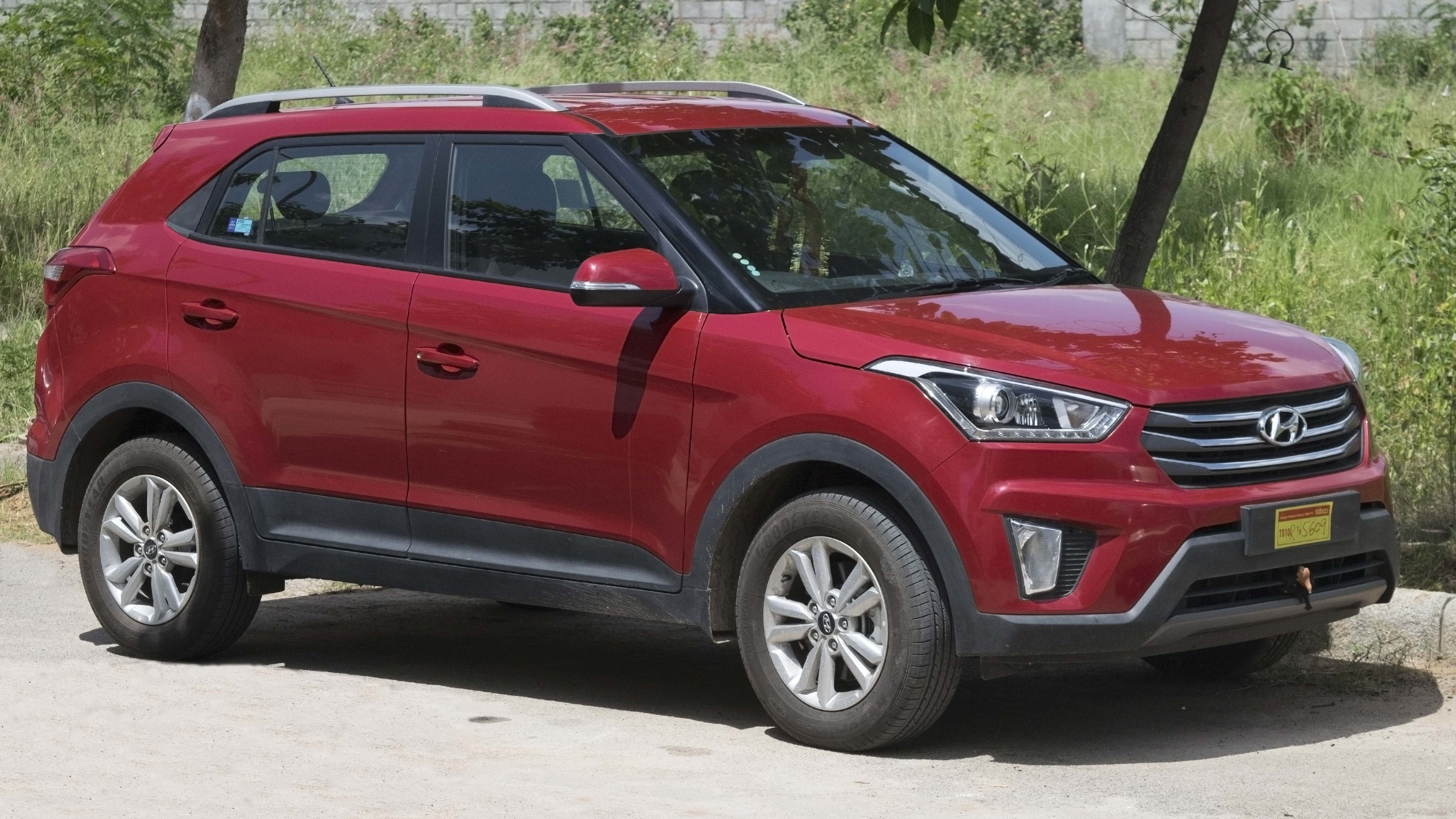
- 2016 Hyundai Creta 1.4 S+ (GS; pre-facelift)

Overview
- Model code: GS; GC (China)
- Also called: Hyundai ix25 (China); Hyundai Cantus (Dominican Republic)
- Production: 2014–2019 (China); 2015–2020 (India); 2016–2021 (Russia); 2017–2024 (Brazil)
- Assembly: China: Beijing (Beijing Hyundai); India: Chennai (HMIL); Brazil: Piracicaba (HMB); Russia: Saint Petersburg (HMMR); Algeria: Tiaret (TMC)

Body and chassis
- Platform: Hyundai-Kia PB
- Related: Kia KX3

Powertrain
- Engine: Petrol: 1.6 L Gamma MPi I4; 1.6 L Gamma MPi FLEX I4; 2.0 L Nu MPi I4; 2.0 L Nu MPi FLEX I4; Diesel: 1.4 L U II CRDi I4; 1.6 L U II CRDi I4
- Transmission: 6-speed manual; 6-speed automatic

Dimensions
- Wheelbase: 2,590 mm (102.0 in)
- Length: 4,270–4,290 mm (168.1–168.9 in)
- Width: 1,780 mm (70.1 in)
- Height: 1,622–1,646 mm (63.9–64.8 in)

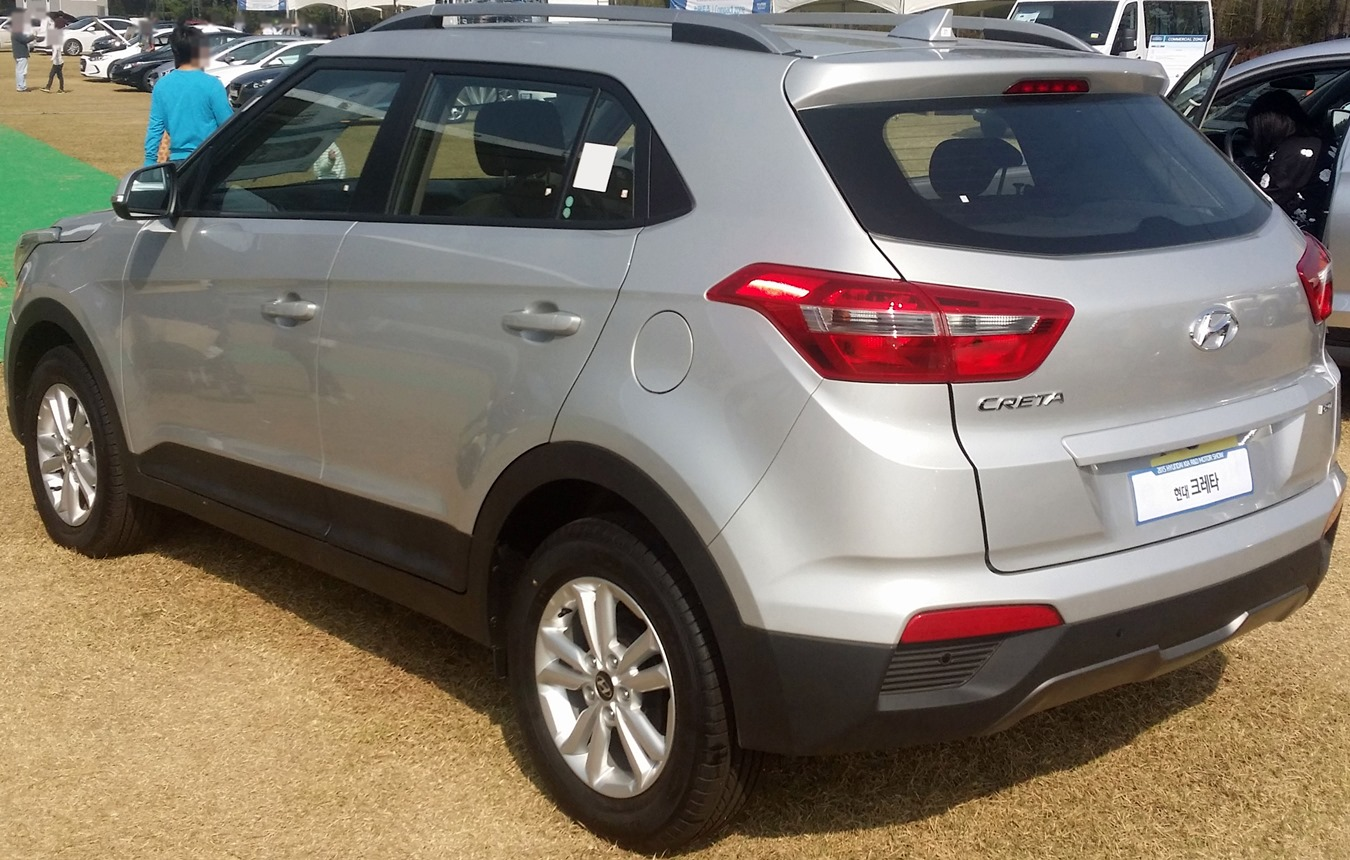
2014 Hyundai Creta (GS; pre-facelift) rear view

Intended to be a global model for emerging markets, the vehicle debuted at the 2014 Beijing Motor Show in April 2014 in a near-production concept guise called the ix25 Concept. The production version went on sale in China in October 2014. The model was later also rolled out for production in India, where it went on sale in July 2015 as the Creta. The Creta is based on the Hyundai's new design concept called the Fluidic Sculpture 2.0.

=== Markets ===
==== Argentina ====
The Creta was launched in Argentina in June 2026, it was originally imported from India (2016-20), and then from Brazil (2020-24), it is available on GL, Style, Safety, and Safety+ trim levels.

The only engine option is the 1.6-litre Gamma petrol engine which produces 130 PS (96 kW; 128 hp) and 16.5 kg⋅m (162 N⋅m; 119 lb⋅ft) of torque. The engine is paired with 6-speed automatic transmission and a 6-speed manual transmission.

==== Brazil ====
The Creta was launched in Brazil in December 2016 with deliveries started in January 2017. The Brazilian Creta is produced in Piracicaba plant alongside the HB20, with the codename GSb.

Engine options offered are the 1.6-litre Gamma petrol engine which produces 130 PS (96 kW; 128 hp) and 16.5 kg⋅m (162 N⋅m; 119 lb⋅ft) of torque, and the new 2.0-litre Nu petrol engine capable of 166 PS (122 kW; 164 hp) and 20.5 kg⋅m (201 N⋅m; 148 lb⋅ft), both with double variable valve timing, start-stop engine system, and ethanol-compatible. Both engines are paired with 6-speed automatic transmission, with the 1.6-litre also offered with 6-speed manual transmission.

==== China ====
The production model had its premiere at Chengdu in August 2014, and it went on sale in China two months later. The ix25 for the Chinese market is available with 1.6-litre and 2.0-litre petrol engines mated either to a 6-speed manual or an automatic transmission. It is available with front-wheel drive or all-wheel drive.

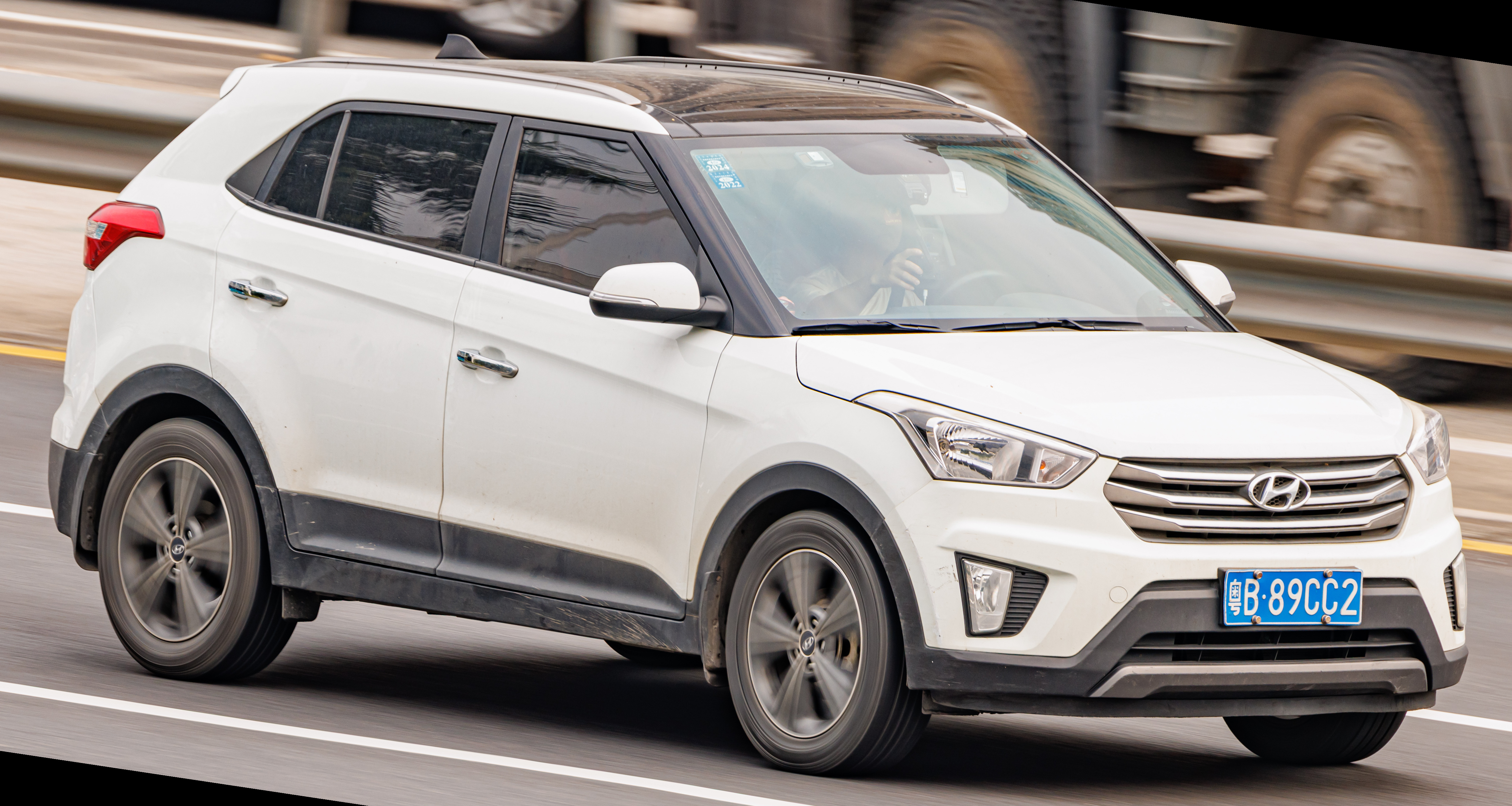
Hyundai ix25 (GC; pre-facelift)

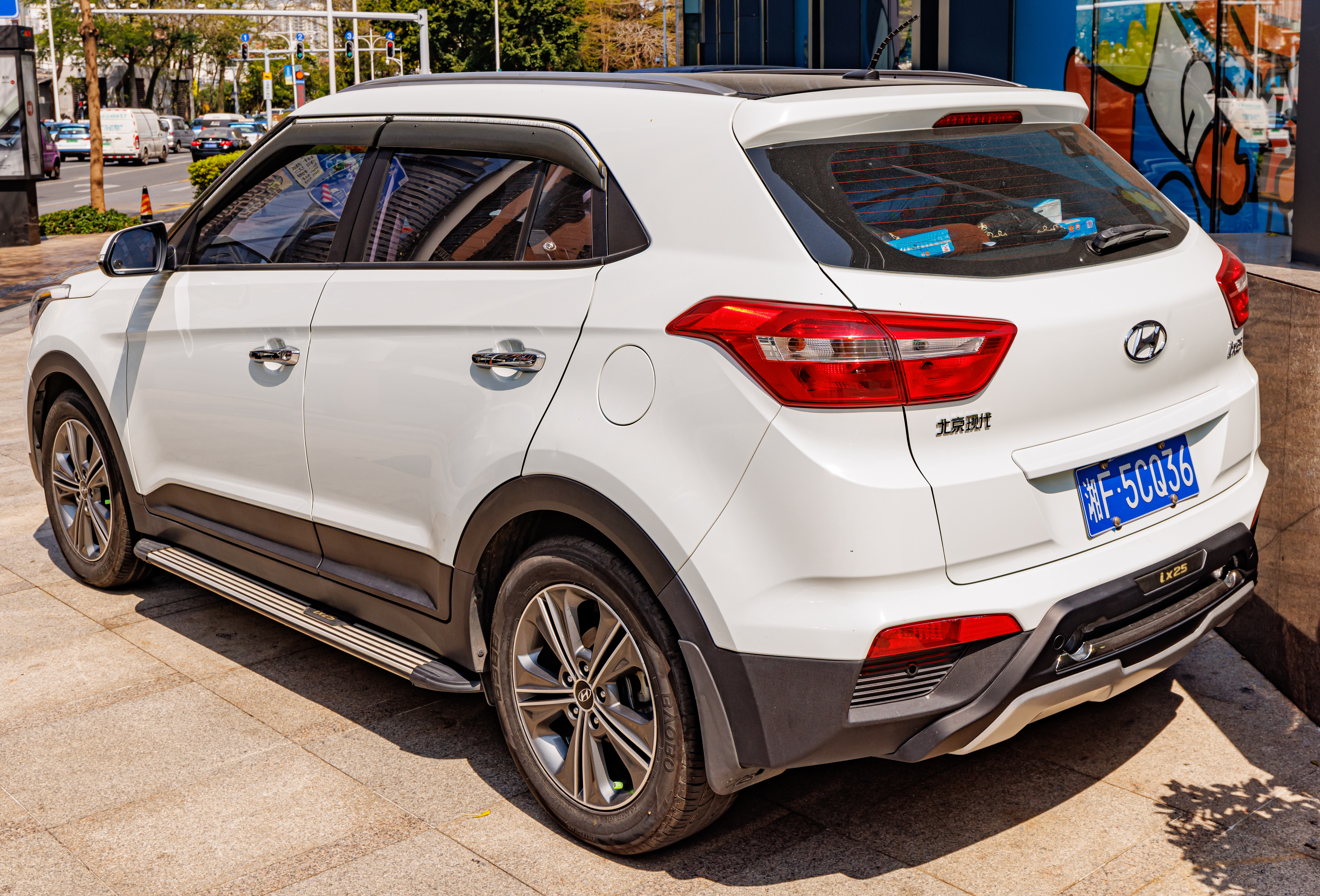
2014 Hyundai ix25 (GC; pre-facelift)

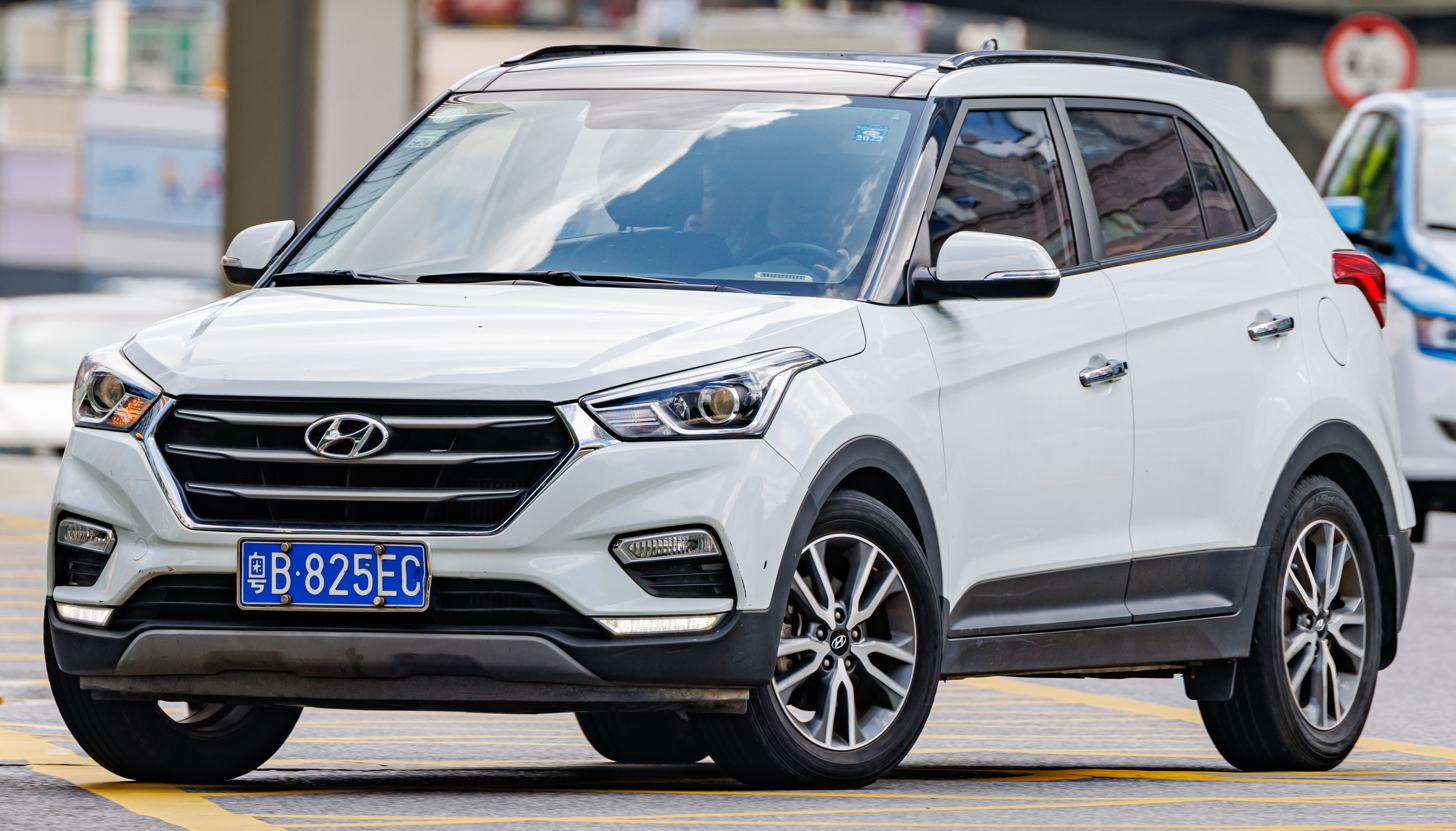
2019 Hyundai ix25 (GC; facelift)

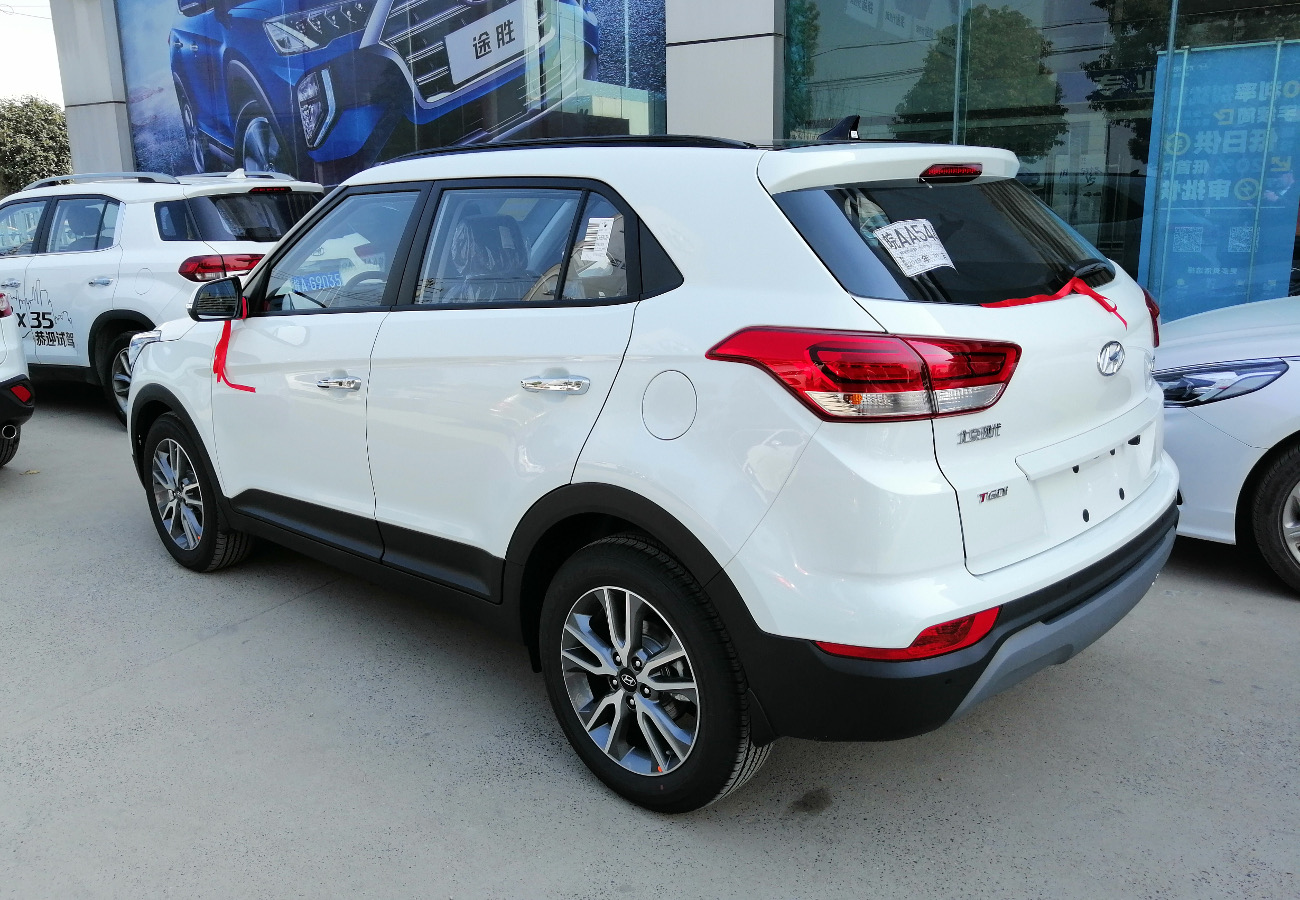
2019 Hyundai ix25 (GC; facelift)

==== India ====
The Creta went on sale in India on 21 July 2015, produced at the Chennai plant. At launch, the Creta was available in a choice of three engines — a 1.6-litre petrol, a 1.4 or a 1.6-litre diesel from the Verna. A 6-speed manual transmission will be standard across all variants, with only the 1.6 diesel SX+ variant getting the option of a 6-speed automatic. The engine options were spread to six trim levels, which are Base, S, S+, SX, SX+ and the top-spec SX (O).

The Creta SX is also offered with a dual tone red and black or a white and black exterior color options. The SX dual tone variant is powered by a 1.6-liter gasoline or a diesel engine without any automatic transmission option.

For select trims, the Creta is equipped including Vehicle Stability Management (VSM), Electronic Stability Control (ESC), Hillstart Assist Control (HAC), Rear Parking Assist System, and ABS. The six airbag system provides all round protection. One for the driver, one for the front seat passenger, front and rear curtain airbags running the length of the cabin, plus front side airbags. Hyundai also claimed the vehicle is built with HIVE body structure, which signifies structural strength.

By November 2015, the vehicle has registered over 70,000 bookings in India and 15,770 worldwide. By August 2017, more than 200,000 Creta were sold in the country.

In 2017, the vehicle contains about 90% Indian parts.

In April 2026, Hyundai Creta led mid-size SUV sales in India.

==== Russia ====
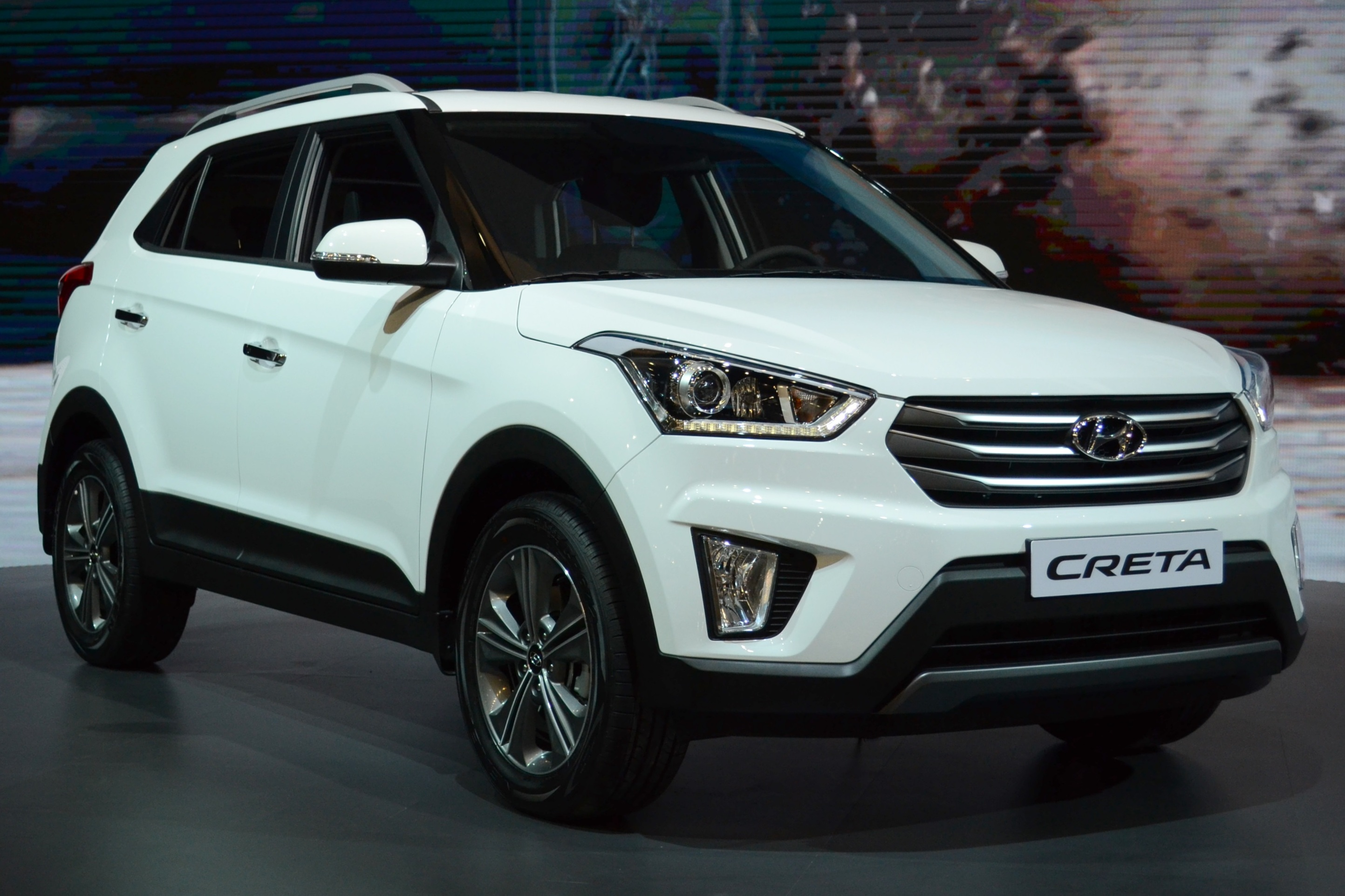
2016 Hyundai Creta 2.0 (GS; pre-facelift)

Production of the Creta commences in Hyundai Saint Petersburg plant in August 2016 to supply Russia and other CIS markets. The assembly of the car takes place on the same production line of the plant along with the Solaris model. The model is claimed to be specially adapted for Russian conditions. It is sold in three trim levels, with two choices of petrol engines: 1.6-litre capable of 123 PS (90 kW; 121 hp) and 2.0-litre with 149 PS (110 kW; 147 hp) of power output, with front or all-wheel drive.

=== Safety ===
The Indian-made Creta in its most basic version for Latin America received 4 stars for adult occupants and 3 stars for toddlers from Latin NCAP 1.0 in 2015.

Latin NCAP 1.5 test results Hyundai Creta + 2 Airbags (2015, similar to Euro NCAP 2002)
Test	Points	Stars
Adult occupant:	15.57/17.0	4 /5 stars
Child occupant:	29.87/49.00	3 /5 stars

=== Powertrain ===
Specs
Petrol engines
Model	Engine	Power	Torque	Transmissions	0–100 km/h (0-62 mph) (official)	Top speed
1.6 Gamma MPI	1,591 cc (97.1 cu in) I4	121 PS (89 kW; 119 hp) @ 6,200 rpm 123 PS (90 kW; 121 hp) @ 6,300 rpm	15.1 kg⋅m (148 N⋅m; 109 lb⋅ft) @ 4,850 rpm 15.4 kg⋅m (151 N⋅m; 111 lb⋅ft) @ 4,850 rpm	6-speed manual	12.3s (FWD); 12.9s (AWD)	169 km/h (105 mph) (FWD); 167 km/h (104 mph) (AWD)
1.6 Gamma MPI	1,591 cc (97.1 cu in) I4	121 PS (89 kW; 119 hp) @ 6,200 rpm 123 PS (90 kW; 121 hp) @ 6,300 rpm	15.1 kg⋅m (148 N⋅m; 109 lb⋅ft) @ 4,850 rpm 15.4 kg⋅m (151 N⋅m; 111 lb⋅ft) @ 4,850 rpm	6-speed automatic	12.1s (FWD); 13.1s (AWD)	169 km/h (105 mph) (FWD); 167 km/h (104 mph) (AWD)
1.6 Gamma MPI FLEX	1,591 cc (97.1 cu in) I4	130 PS (96 kW; 128 hp) @ 6,300 rpm	16.5 kg⋅m (162 N⋅m; 119 lb⋅ft) @ 4,850 rpm	6-speed manual		
1.6 Gamma MPI FLEX	1,591 cc (97.1 cu in) I4	130 PS (96 kW; 128 hp) @ 6,300 rpm	16.5 kg⋅m (162 N⋅m; 119 lb⋅ft) @ 4,850 rpm	6-speed automatic	12.0s (FWD)	172 km/h (107 mph) (FWD)
2.0 L Nu MPI	1,999 cc (122.0 cu in) I4	149.6 PS (110 kW; 148 hp) @ 6,200 rpm	19.6 kg⋅m (192 N⋅m; 142 lb⋅ft) @ 4,200 rpm	6-speed automatic	10.7s (FWD); 11.3s (AWD)	183 km/h (114 mph) (FWD); 179 km/h (111 mph) (AWD)
2.0 L Nu MPI FLEX	1,999 cc (122.0 cu in) I4	166 PS (122 kW; 164 hp) @ 6,200 rpm	20.5 kg⋅m (201 N⋅m; 148 lb⋅ft) @ 4,700 rpm	6-speed automatic		

Diesel engines
Model	Engine	Power	Torque	Transmissions	0–100 km/h (0-62 mph) (official)	Top speed
1.6 L U II CRDi	1,582 cc (96.5 cu in) I4	128 PS (94 kW; 124 hp) @ 4,000 rpm	26.5 kg⋅m (260 Nm; 192 lb-ft) @ 2 750 rpm	6-speed automatic	11.9s (FWD)	179 km/h (111 mph) FWD

=== Facelift ===
The refreshed version was released in China in August 2017, India in May 2018, and Brazil in July 2019. It received a cosmetic update which include an updated front bumper with a large hexagonal chrome-lined grille and a new rear bumper. It also features new headlamps and tail lamps, new bumpers, and new wheel design. The Brazilian Creta also received a newly designed rear LED taillights. The Chinese version received an altered front bumper design compared to the Indian and Brazilian version.

The Russian version received a minor change in April 2020. Unlike the other Creta versions, the changes in the Russian Creta were kept minimal as the front end only received a new grille design.

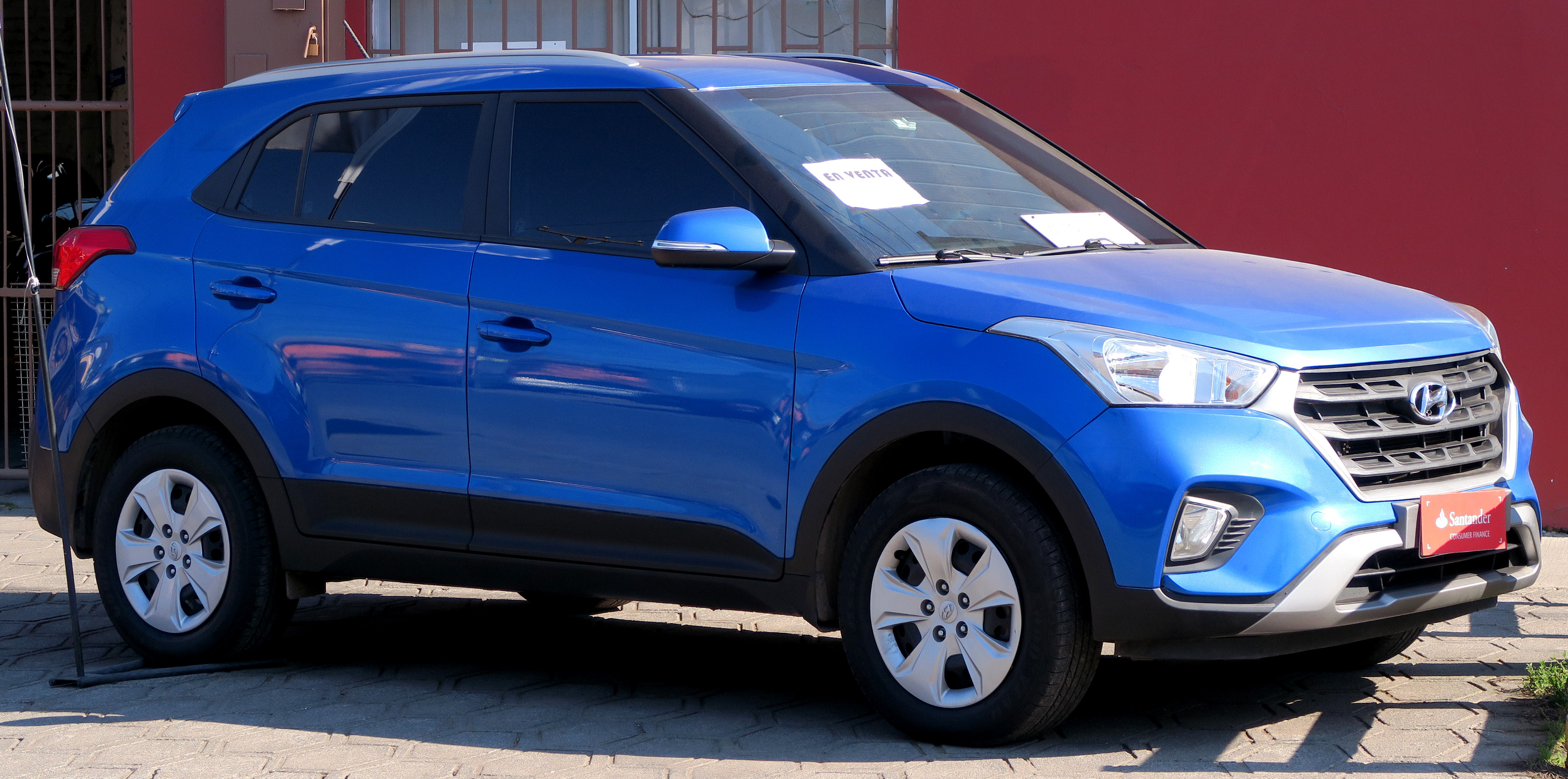
2019 Hyundai Creta GL (GS; facelift, Chile)

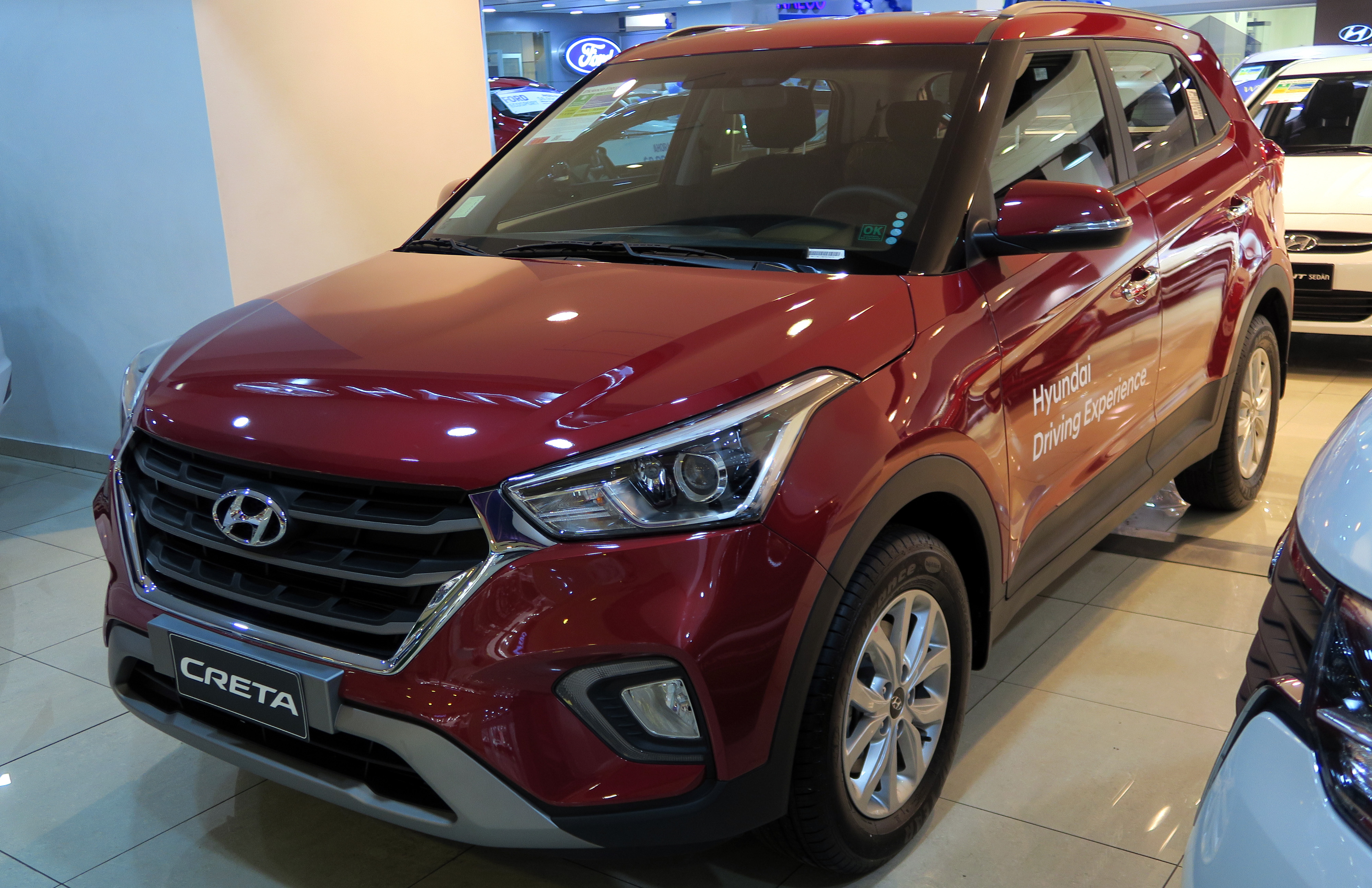
2019 Hyundai Creta GLS (GS; facelift, Chile)

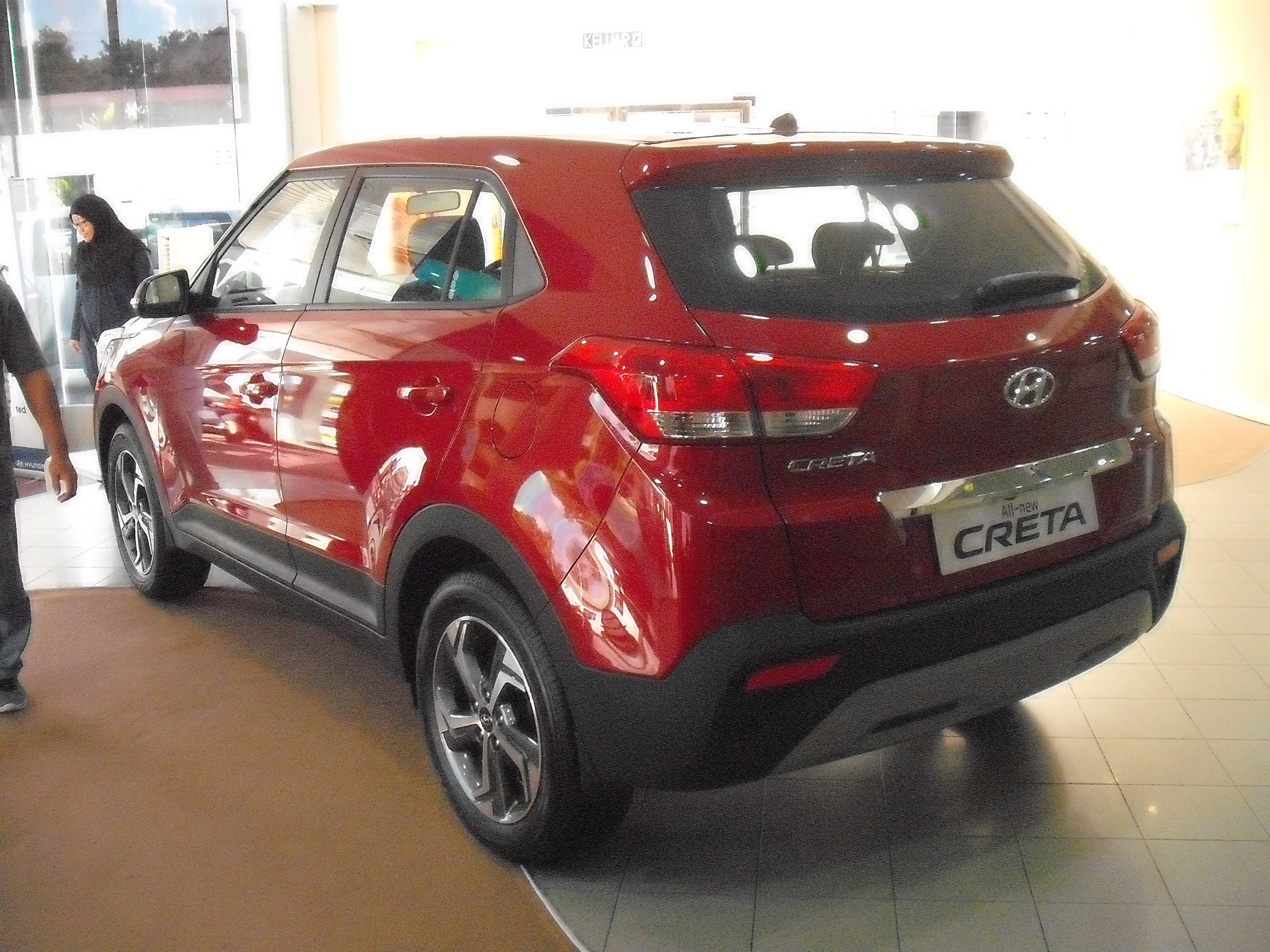
2018 Hyundai Creta (GS; facelift, Brunei)

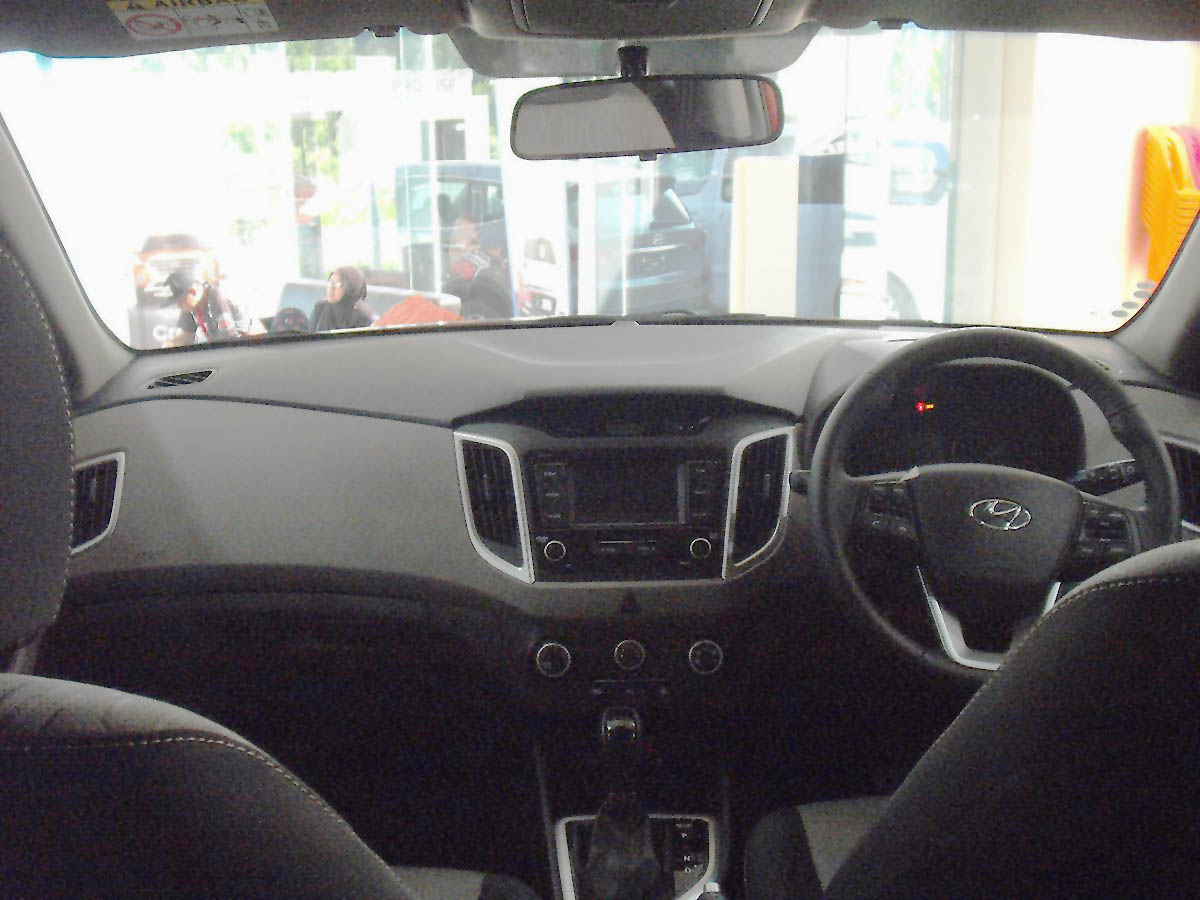
Interior

== Second generation (SU2; 2019) ==
Second generation
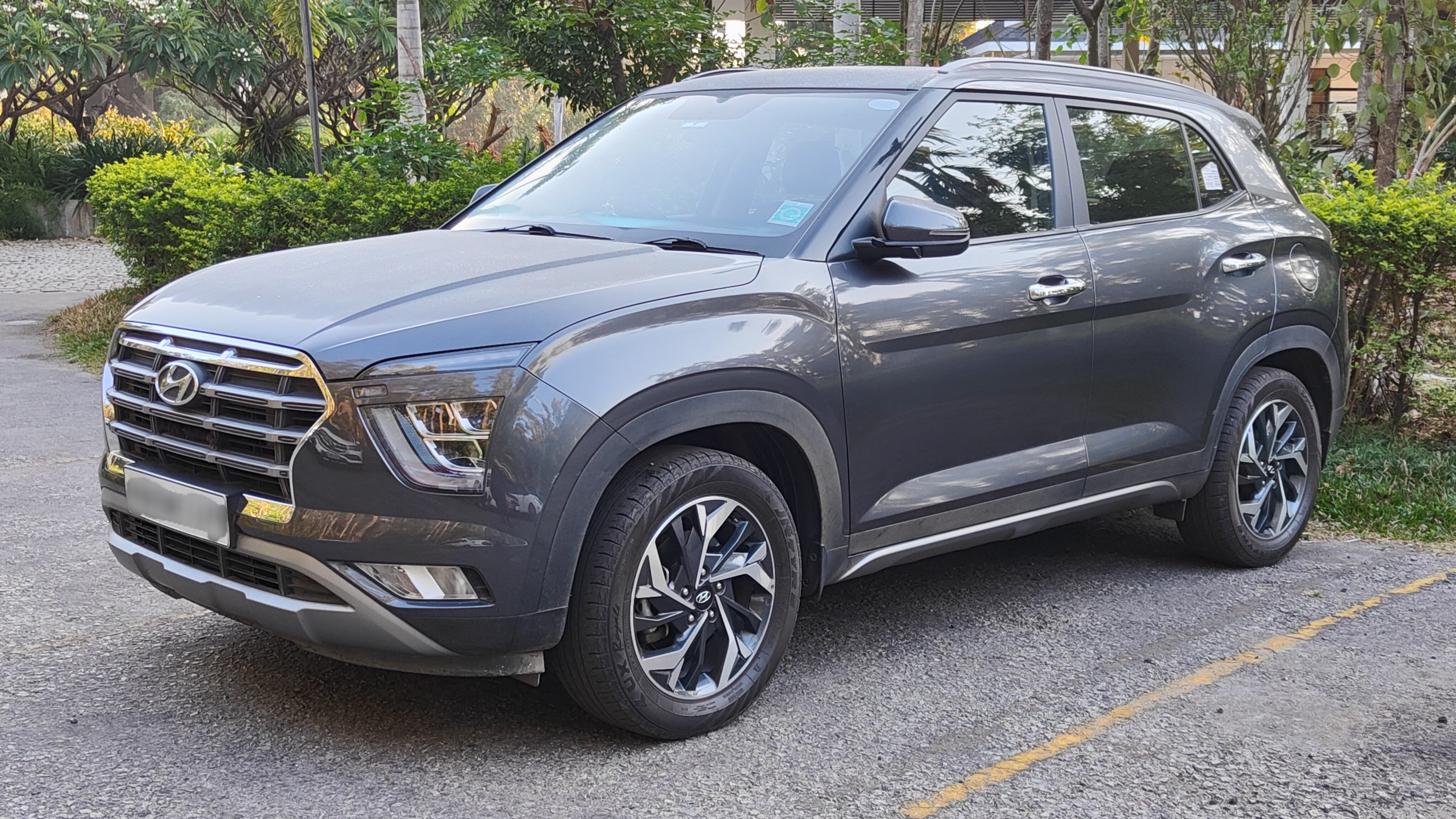
- 2021 Hyundai Creta (SU2i, India) (pre-facelift)

Overview
- Model code: SU2
- Also called: Hyundai ix25 (China); Hyundai Cantus (Dominican Republic); Solaris HC (Russia, 2024–2026); Solaris Accent HC (CIS members, 2024–present)
- Production: 2019–2021 (China); 2020–present (India); 2021–2022, 2024–2026 (Russia); 2021–present (Brazil); 2022–present (Indonesia); 2023–present (Bangladesh)
- Assembly: China: Beijing (Beijing Hyundai); India: Chennai (HMIL); Russia: Saint Petersburg (HMMR); Brazil: Piracicaba (HMB); Indonesia: Cikarang, West Java (HMMI); Vietnam: Ninh Bình (HTMV); Bangladesh: Kaliakair, Gazipur (FTL)
- Designer: Thomas Burkle (Exterior); Alexander Suvorov (Interior)

Body and chassis
- Platform: Hyundai-Kia K2; Hyundai-Kia K2 BEV (Creta Electric)
- Related: Hyundai Alcazar; Hyundai Stargazer; Kia Seltos (SP2i/SP2c); Kia Carens (KY)

Powertrain
- Engine: Petrol: 1.0 L Kappa II T-GDi FLEX I3; 1.4 L Kappa II T-GDi I4; 1.5 L Smartstream G1.5 MPi I4; 1.5 L Smartstream G1.5 T-GDi I4; 1.6 L Gamma MPi I4; 2.0 L Nu MPi I4; 2.0 L Smartstream G2.0 MPi I4; Diesel: 1.5 L U II CRDi I4
- Transmission: 6-speed manual; 6-speed clutchless manual; 6-speed automatic; 7-speed DCT; CVT
- Battery: 42 kWh LGES NMC lithium-ion (Creta Electric); 51.4 kWh LGES NMC lithium-ion (Creta Electric)

Dimensions
- Wheelbase: 2,610 mm (102.8 in)
- Length: 4,300–4,340 mm (169.3–170.9 in)
- Width: 1,790 mm (70.5 in)
- Height: 1,620–1,655 mm (63.8–65.2 in)
- Curb weight: 1,150–1,365 kg (2,535–3,009 lb) (SU2i); 1,270–1,495 kg (2,800–3,296 lb) (SU2r)

Chronology
- Predecessor: Hyundai Kona (Southeast Asia); Hyundai Kona Electric (India, electric)

The second-generation model was first shown in China as the ix25 in April 2019. It was unveiled as the Creta at the 15th Auto Expo in India in February 2020. Production of the second-generation Creta in Russia started in July 2021, in Brazil in August 2021, and in Indonesia in January 2022.

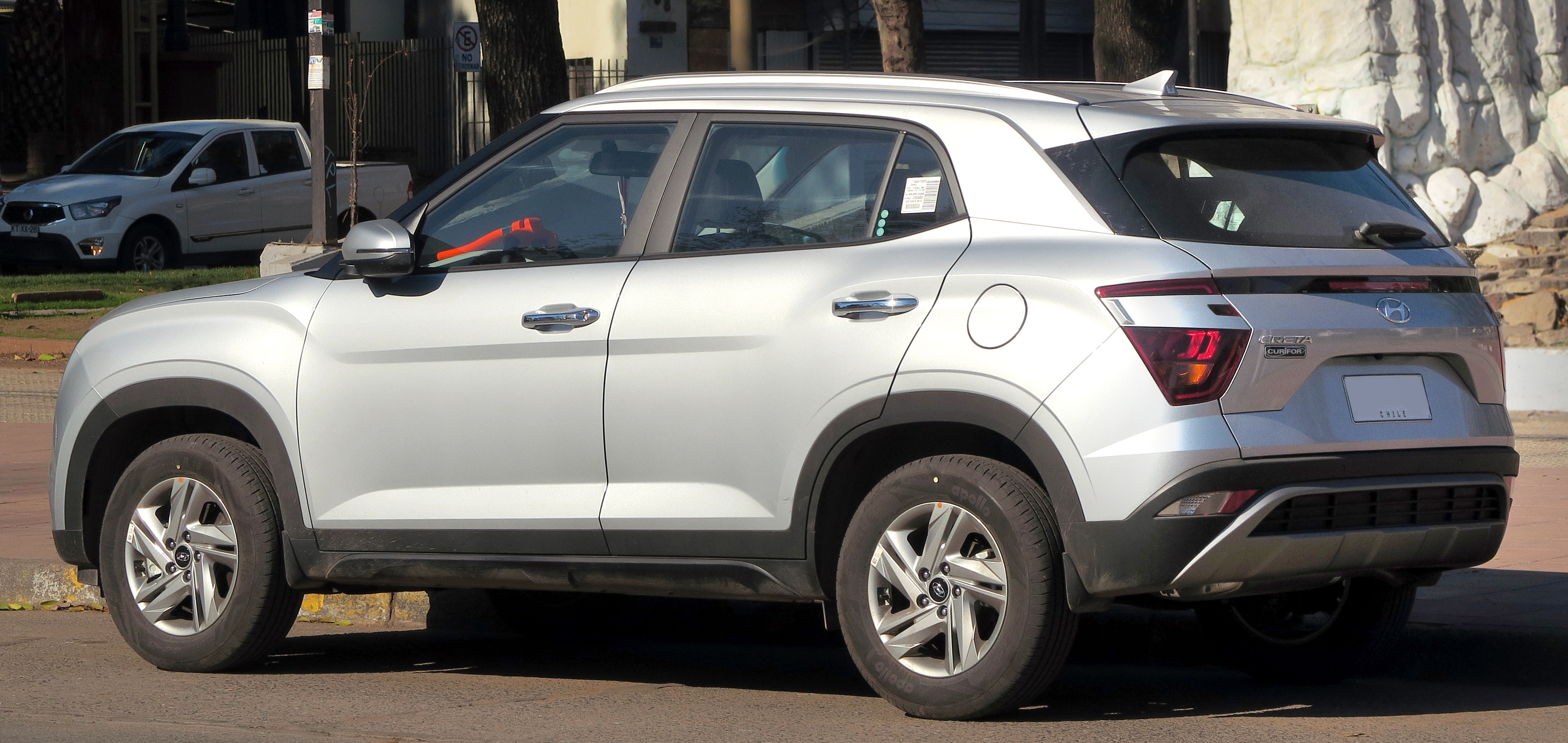
2021 Hyundai Creta (SU2i)

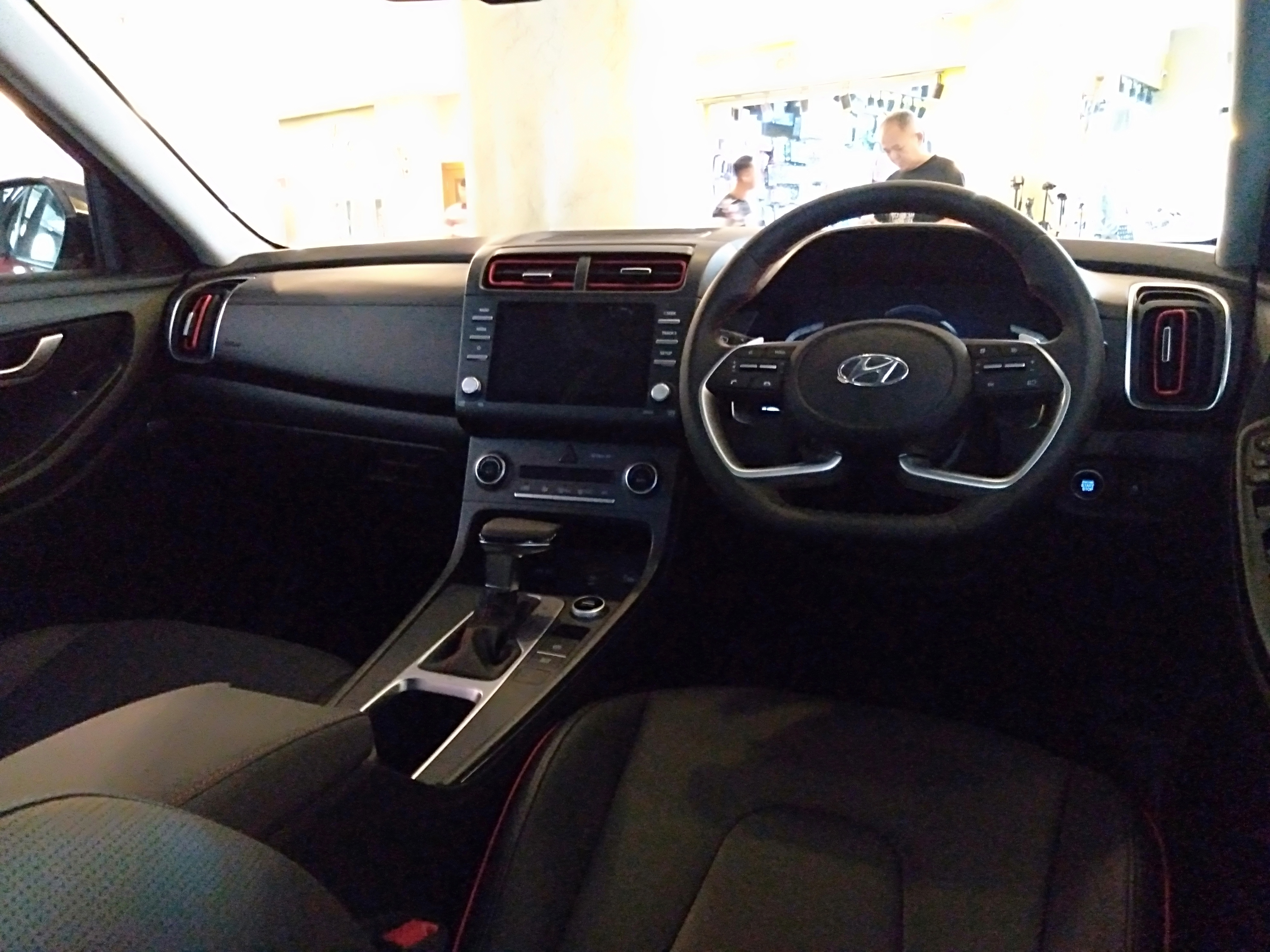
Interior (SU2i)

=== Creta Electric ===
The Creta Electric was unveiled by Hyundai Motor India on 2 January 2025 as an all-electric version of its popular Creta compact SUV. It was launched in India on 17 January 2025 at the Bharat Mobility Global Expo.

Its exterior retains the familiar Creta silhouette while adding EV-specific details such as a closed-off front grille, revised bumpers, aerodynamic alloy wheels, and distinctive LED lighting.

The interior features a modern dual-screen layout with digital instrumentation and an infotainment display, along with connected-car technology, comfort-oriented seating, and advanced driver-assistance features.

The electric powertrains include a 42 kWh battery paired with a 99 kW (135 PS) motor and a 51.4 kWh battery paired with a 126 kW (171 PS) motor, providing claimed MIDC ranges of up to 420 km and 510 km respectively.

The long-range version can accelerate from 0 to 100 km/h in 7.9 seconds, while both variants support fast charging, making the Creta Electric a practical battery-electric alternative within Hyundai’s Indian SUV lineup.

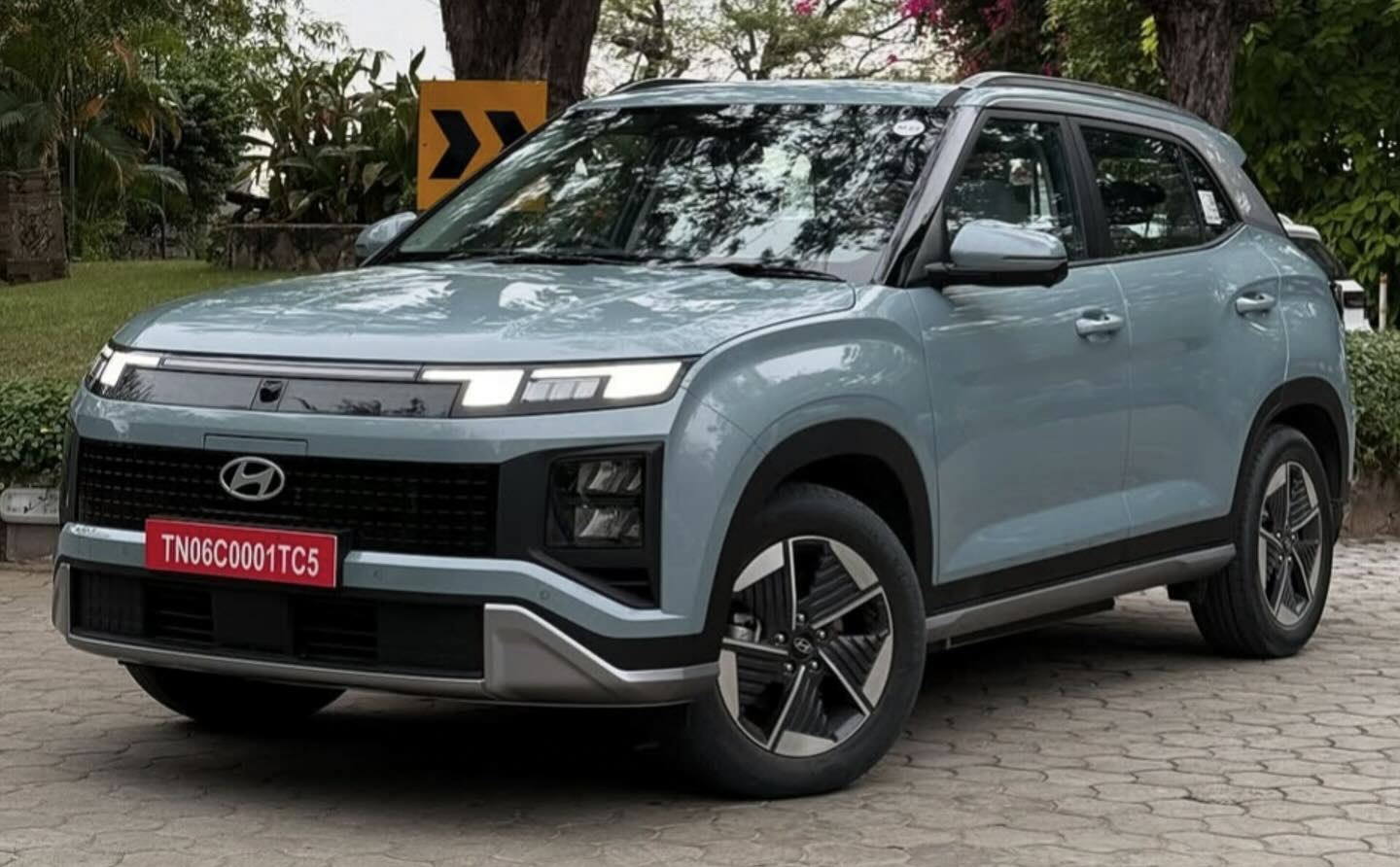
2025 Creta Electric (India)

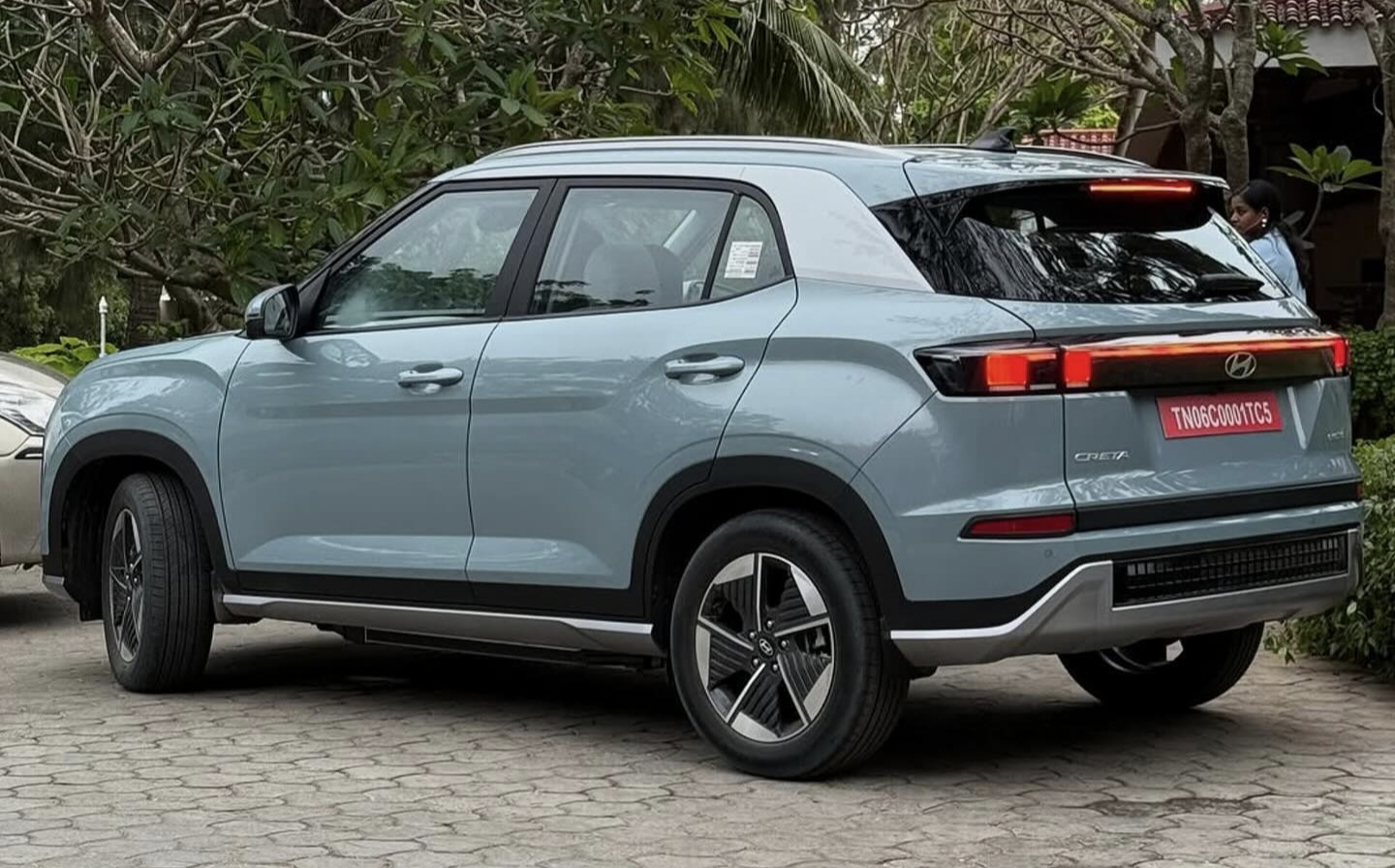
Rear view

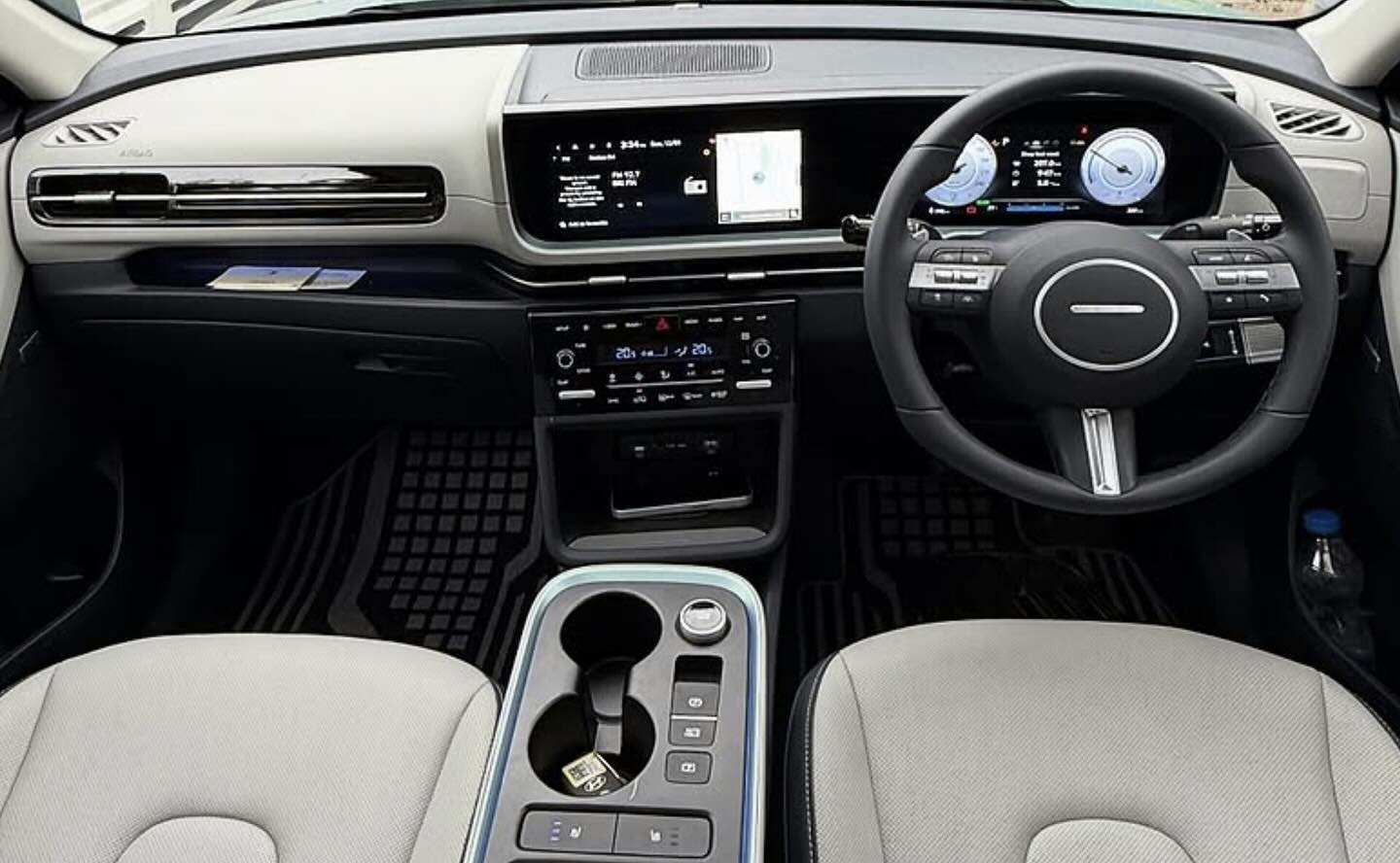
Interior

=== Markets ===
==== Asia ====
===== China =====
The second-generation ix25 was revealed during the 2019 Shanghai Auto Show in April 2019. The Chinese model (codename: SU2c) is solely powered by the 1.5-litre petrol engine producing 115 PS (85 kW; 113 hp). It went on sale in October 2019. The interior of the Chinese-market ix25 largely differ with the globally-marketed Creta as the Chinese-spec model comes with a vertical touchscreen infotainment system that flows into the central console, while the global Creta opts for a more conventional design. Production of the ix25 in China ended in 2021.

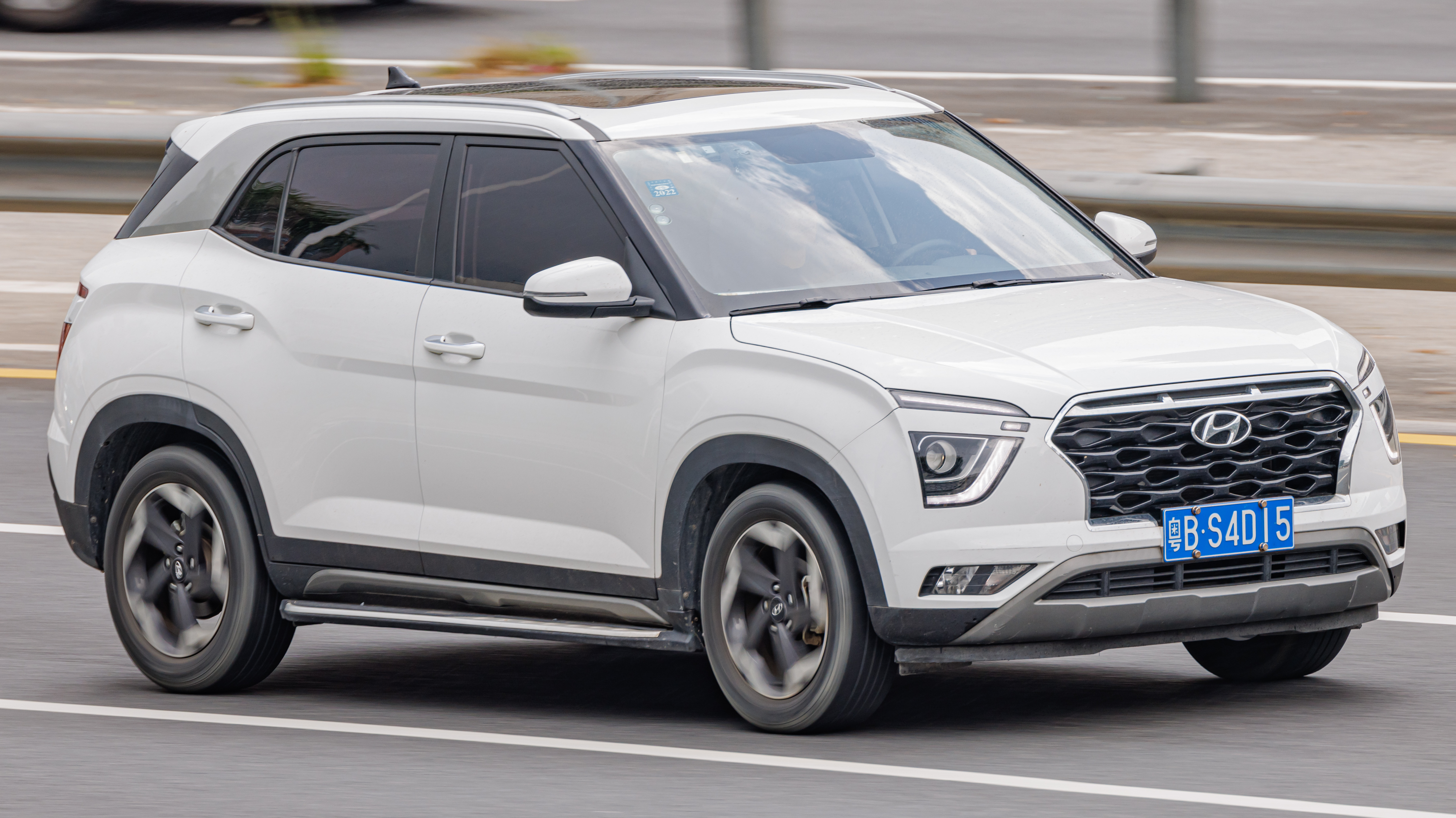
2020 Hyundai ix25 (SU2c, China)

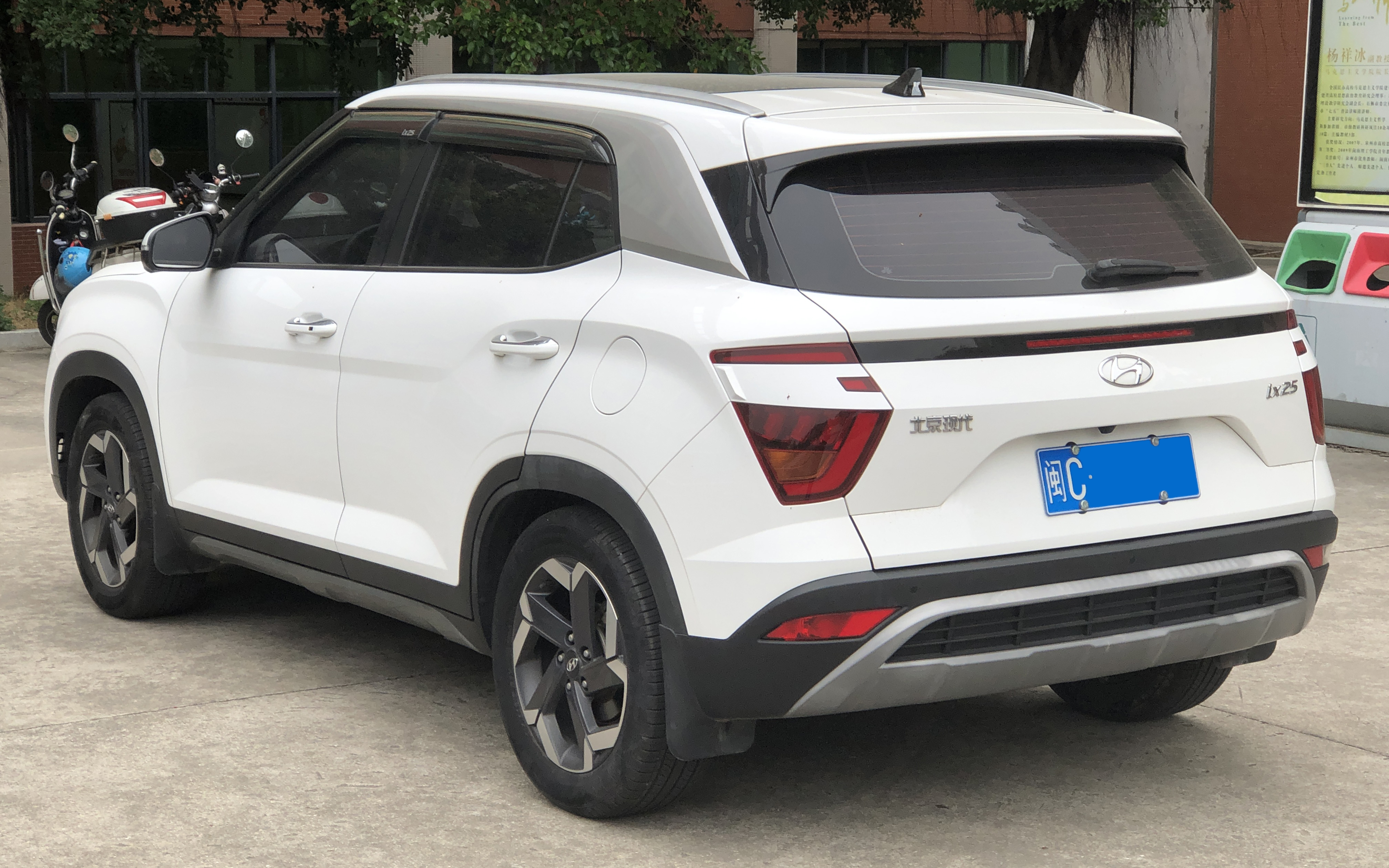
2020 Hyundai ix25 (SU2c, China)

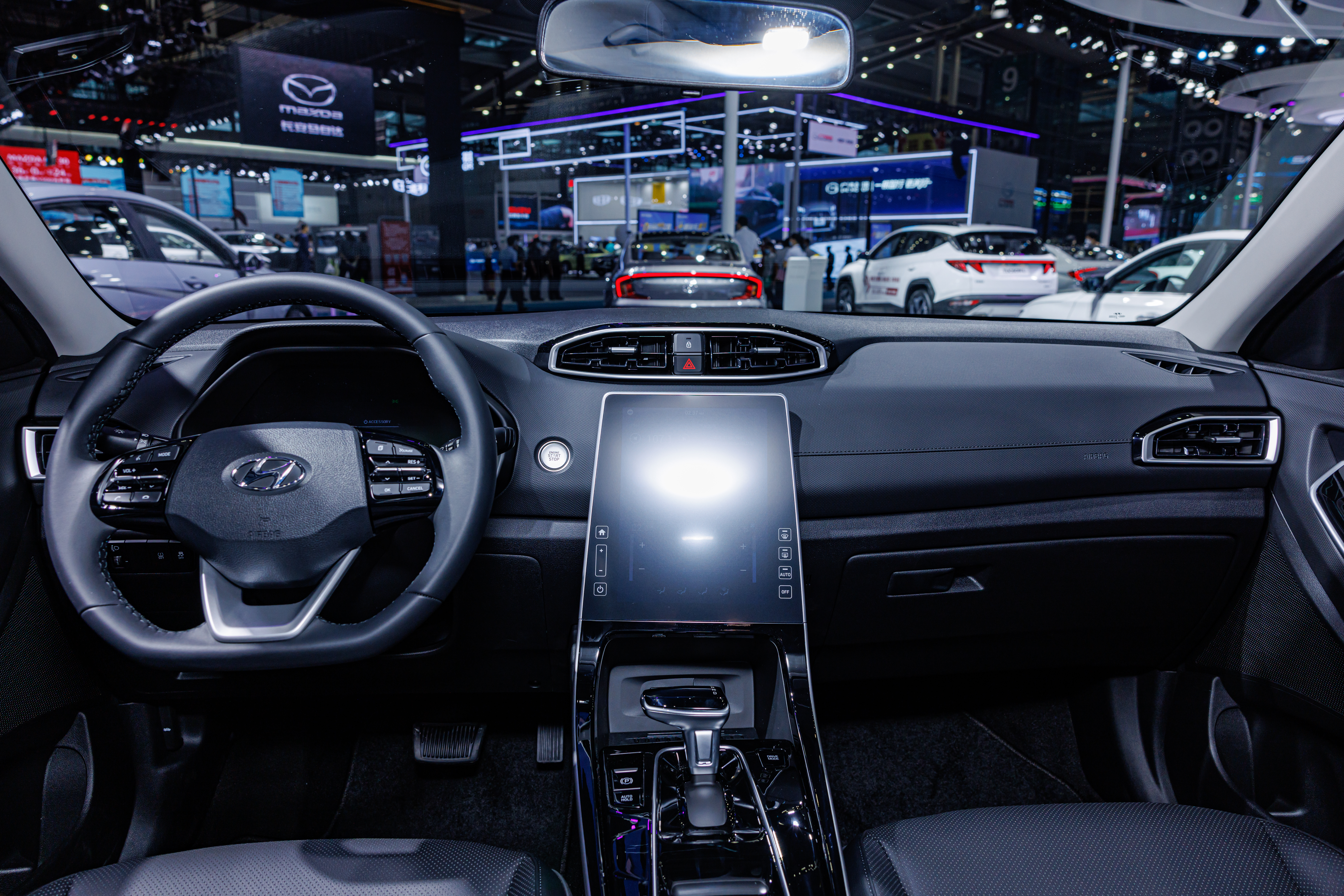
Interior

===== India =====
Hyundai unveiled the second generation Creta in India in February 2020, and was launched to the market in March 2020. The Indian-made Creta (codename: SU2i) is a slightly modified version of the Hyundai ix25 sold in China, with the main visual difference at the exterior being the design of the front grille. It is exported to 85 countries across Africa, Middle East, and Latin America.

The Creta for the Indian market is offered with three engine options, 1.5-litre petrol producing 115 PS (85 kW; 113 hp) and develops 144 N⋅m (15 kg⋅m; 106 lb⋅ft) of torque and a 1.5-litre diesel engine with 115 PS (85 kW; 113 hp) and 250 N⋅m (25 kg⋅m; 184 lb⋅ft) of torque as well as 1.4-litre turbocharged petrol 140 PS (103 kW; 138 hp) and 242 N⋅m (25 kg⋅m; 178 lb⋅ft) of torque.

In April 2022, the iMT gearbox option was released alongside the Knight Edition variant.

The facelifted Creta was released on 16 January 2024. It features a redesigned front and rear fascia with full-width LED light bar headlights and taillights. The interior gets a larger 10.25-inch touchscreen. The updated Creta has an option of Level 2 advanced driver-assistance system (ADAS) with 19 functions.

The Creta N Line sports trim was released on 11 March 2024.

==== GCC ====
The second-generation Creta was launched in October 2020 for the GCC markets. It is imported from India, it is offered in two trims: Smart and Comfort. It is offered with either 1.6-litre petrol engine and offered with either automatic transmission.

In July 2022, the Indian-made Creta was replaced by the Indonesian-made Creta for the GCC markets.

The facelifted Creta was launched on 5 May 2025.

==== Latin America ====
===== Argentina =====
The second-generation Creta was launched on 9 November 2022 for Argentinean market. It is imported from Brazil, it is offered in Safety and Safety+ trim levels. it is powered by a 1.5-litre petrol engine producing 115 PS (85 kW; 113 hp) and develops 144 N⋅m (15 kg⋅m; 106 lb⋅ft) of torque.

The facelifted Creta was launched in Argentina on 26 May 2025, initially available in the sole Safety Plus trim powered by the Smartstream 1.5-litre petrol engine paired with an IVT. In December 2025, the entry-level Safety trim was introduced to the line-up.

===== Brazil =====
Production of the Brazilian market Creta (codename: SU2b) in the Piracicaba plant started in August 2021, and was officially launched afterwards. Sharing the similar exterior styling with the Russian-market Creta, the Brazilian model is powered by a 1.0-litre three-cylinder turbocharged petrol-flex engine with a power output of 122 PS (90 kW; 120 hp) along with a flagship 2.0-litre naturally aspirated petrol-flex engine producing 169 PS (124 kW; 167 hp). The N Line model was released in June 2022 with the 1.0-litre turbocharged engine.

The facelifted Creta was launched in Brazil on 7 October 2024, with five trim levels: Comfort, Limited, Platinum, N Line and Ultimate. For engines, all trims (except for the Ultimate) uses the 1.0 T-GDi turbocharged petrol-flex engine and the Ultimate trim use the 1.6 T-GDi turbocharged petrol engine with a producing 196 PS (144 kW; 193 hp).

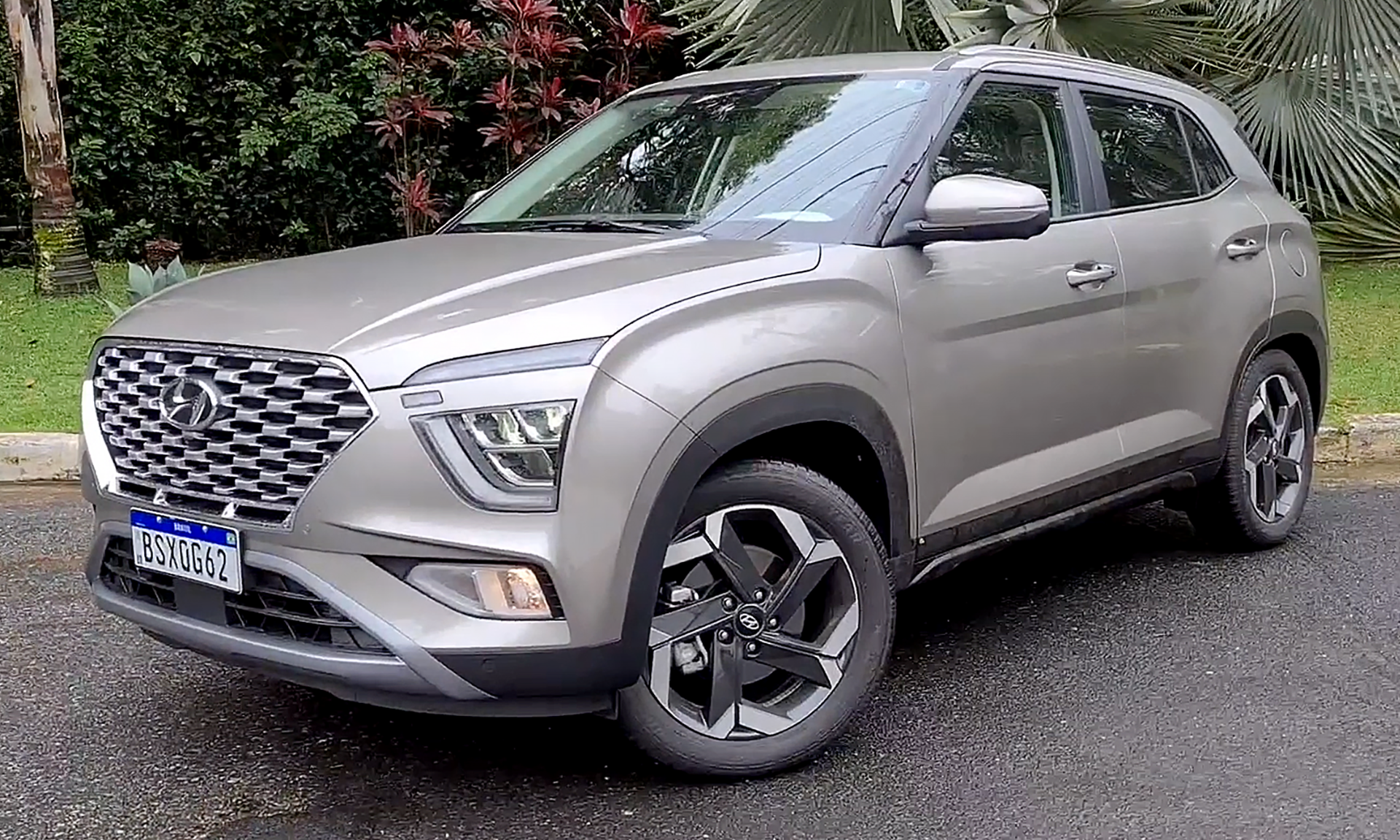
2021 Hyundai Creta 2.0 Ultimate (SU2b, Brazil; pre-facelift)

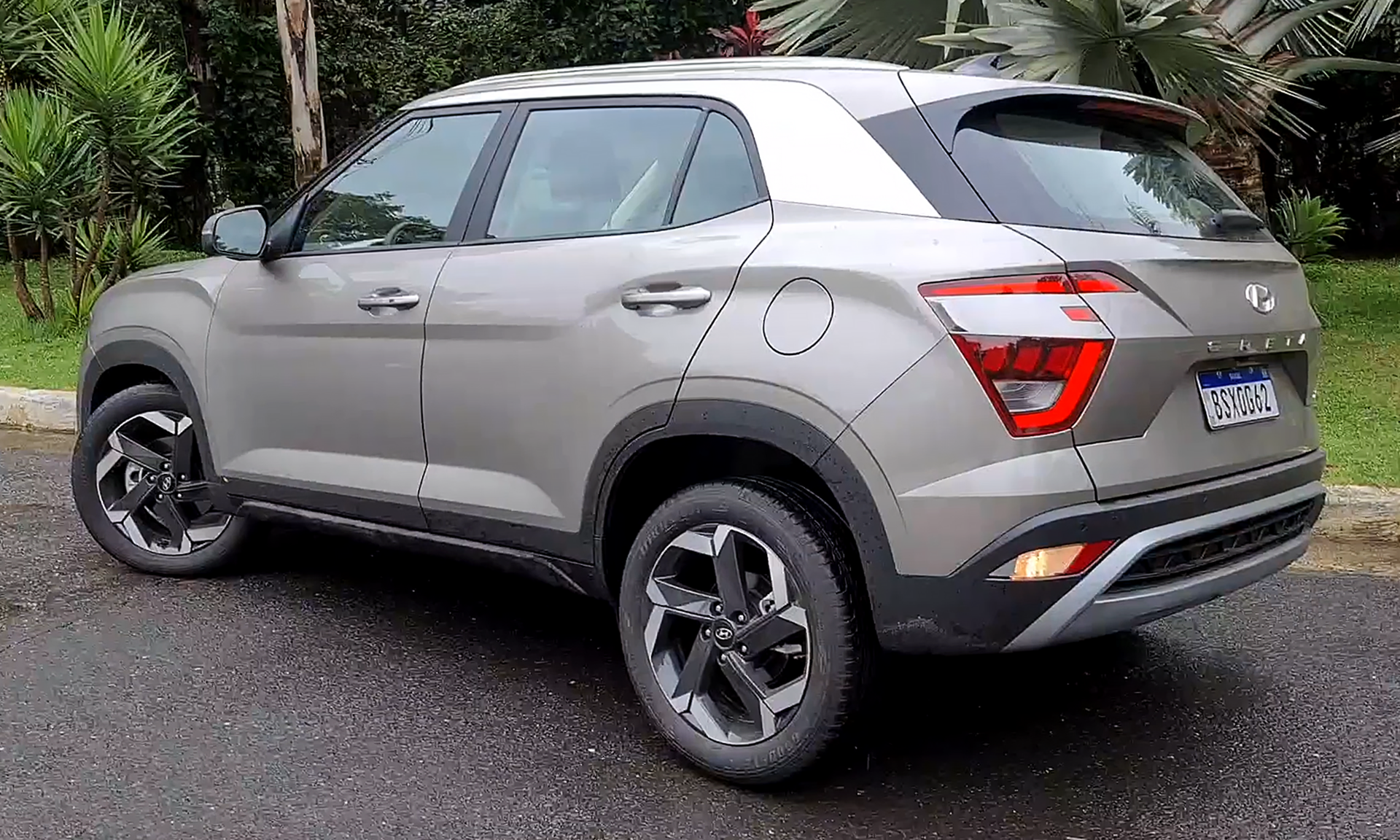
2021 Hyundai Creta 2.0 Ultimate (SU2b, Brazil; pre-facelift)

===== Mexico =====
The second-generation Creta was launched on 10 October 2020 for the Mexican market. Imported from India, it is offered in four trim levels: GL, GLS IVT, GLS Premium, and Limited Turbo. It is offered with either a 1.5-litre petrol or a 1.4-litre turbo petrol engine and offered with either manual or automatic transmission options.

In July 2023, the Mexican market Creta switches to the Indonesian-made model, and loses the 1.4-litre turbo petrol engine option.

In June 2025, the facelifted Creta went on sale in Mexico as a 2026 model year. It gained a 1.5-litre turbo petrol engine option with the Limited Turbo trim.

==== Russia ====
The Russian market Creta (codename: SU2r) was unveiled in June 2021, sporting a revised front and rear end compared to the Indian and Chinese versions of the Creta/ix25. It carries petrol engine options from the previous generation, which are 1.6-litre with a power output of 123 PS (90 kW; 121 hp) and 2.0-litre with 149 PS (110 kW; 147 hp), with all-wheel-drive optional for both engine choices. Trim levels offered are Prime, Classic, Family, Lifestyle and Prestige, as well as the Special Edition version. Production commenced on 1 July 2021 at the Saint Petersburg plant.

Amid the 2022 Russian invasion of Ukraine, production at the Saint Petersburg plant was halted in March 2022. In September 2023, Hyundai sold the Saint Petersburg factory to an unnamed Russian company. In February 2024, the Creta was relaunched as the Solaris HC. The plant and the Solaris brand is under possession of AGR Automotive, a subsidiary of Russian company Art-Finans. The vehicles are produced from unassembled kits are enough to produce around 70,000 vehicles.

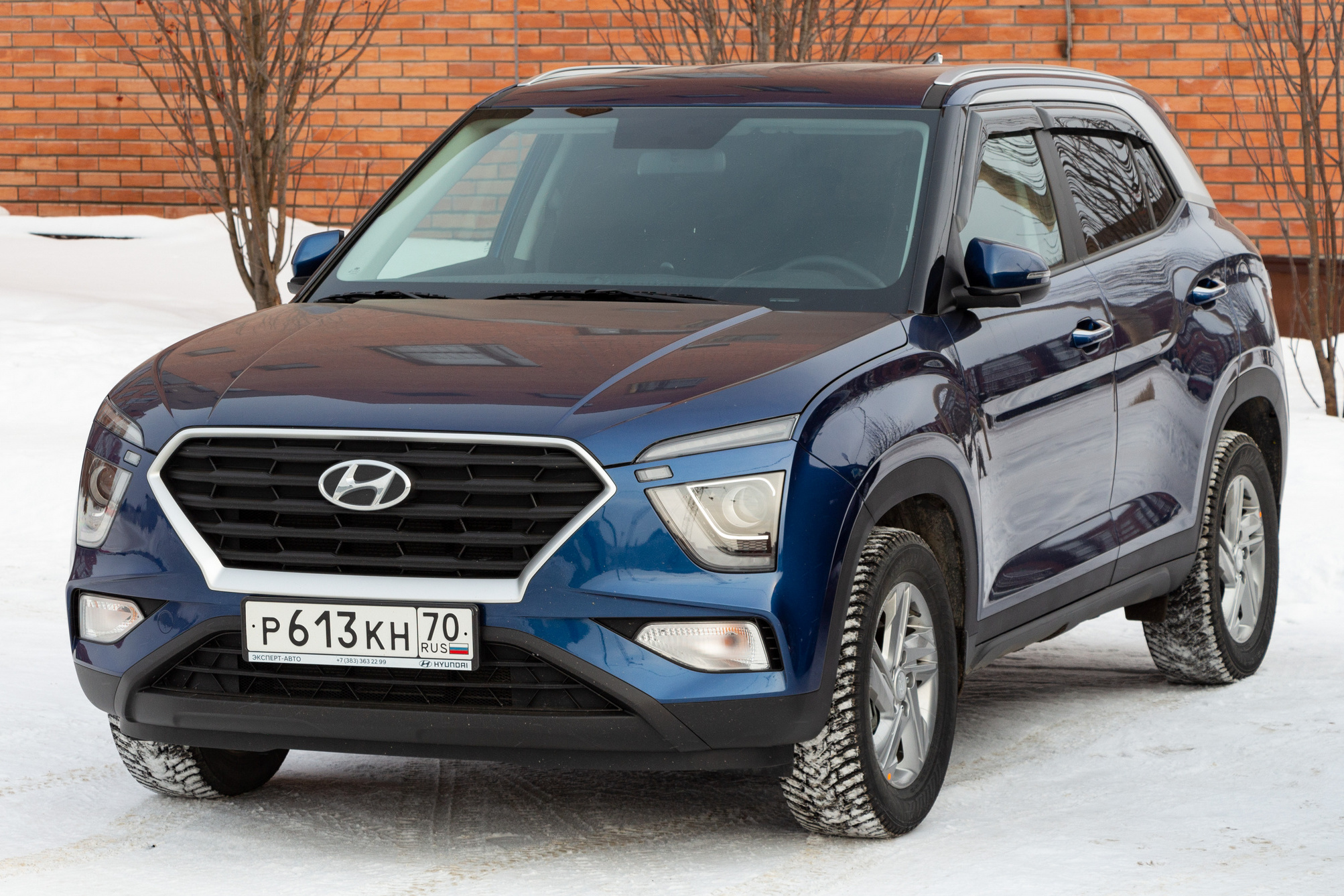
2021 Hyundai Creta (SU2r, Russia)

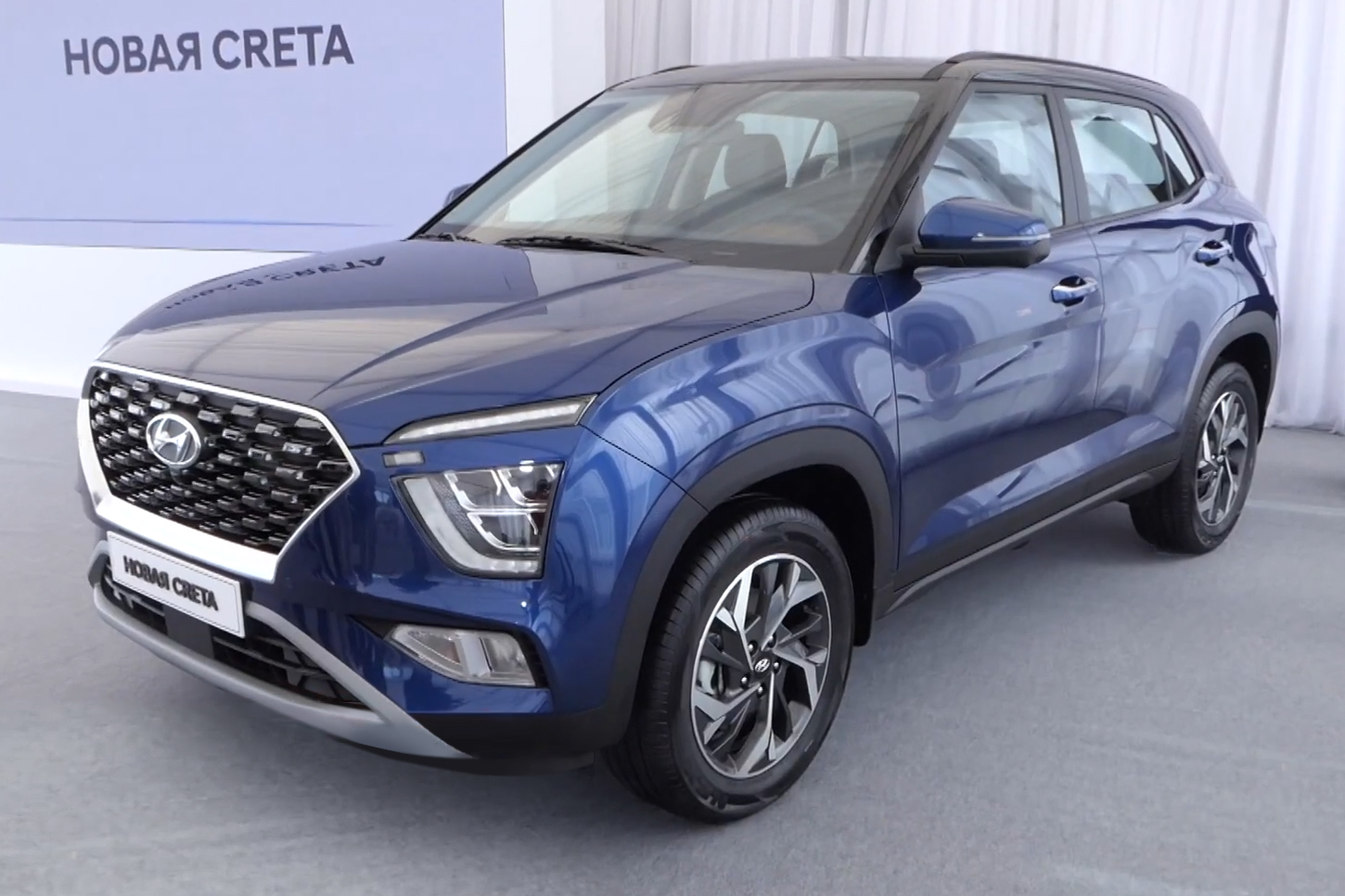
2021 Hyundai Creta 2.0 Prestige (SU2r, Russia)

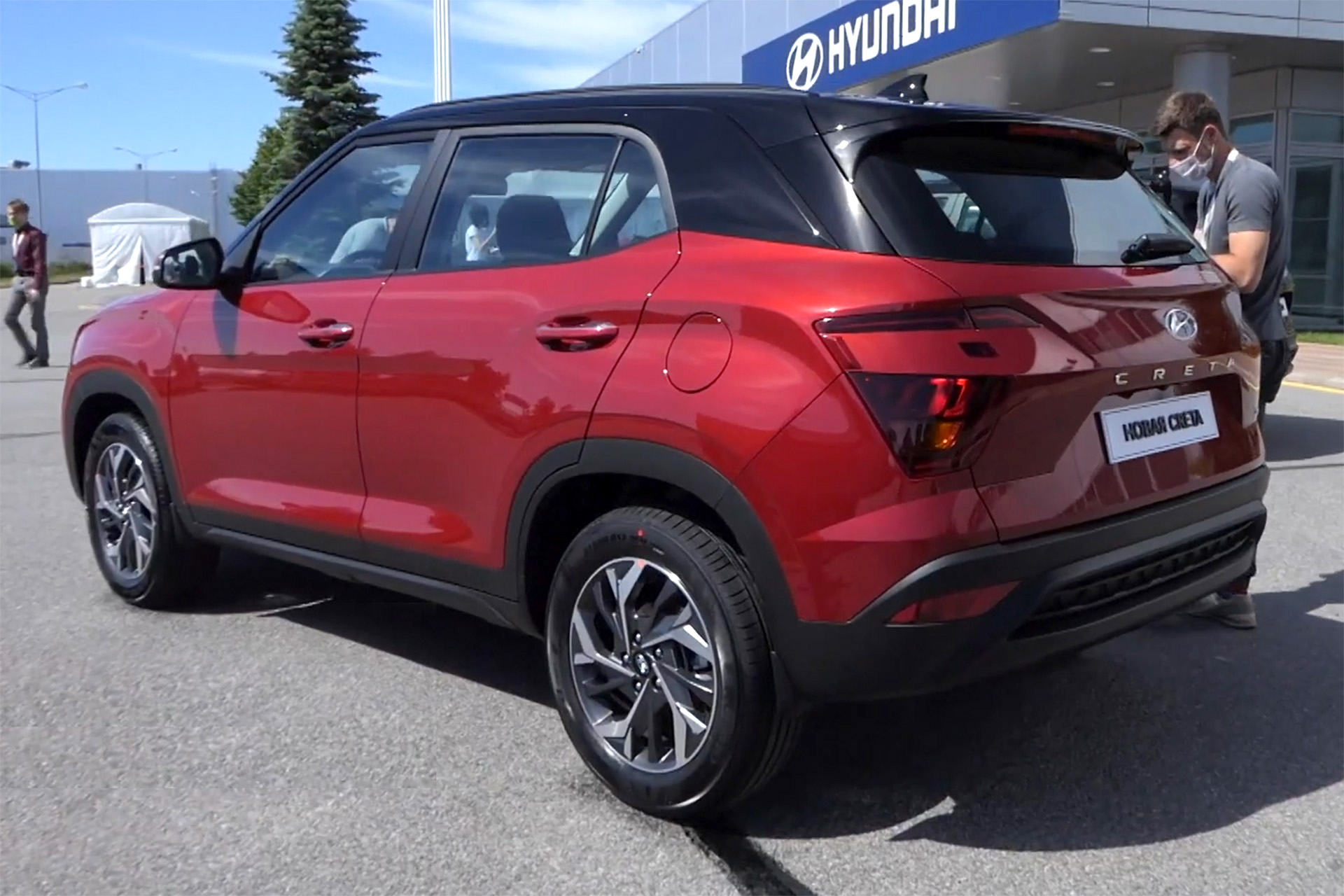
2021 Hyundai Creta 2.0 Prestige (SU2r, Russia)

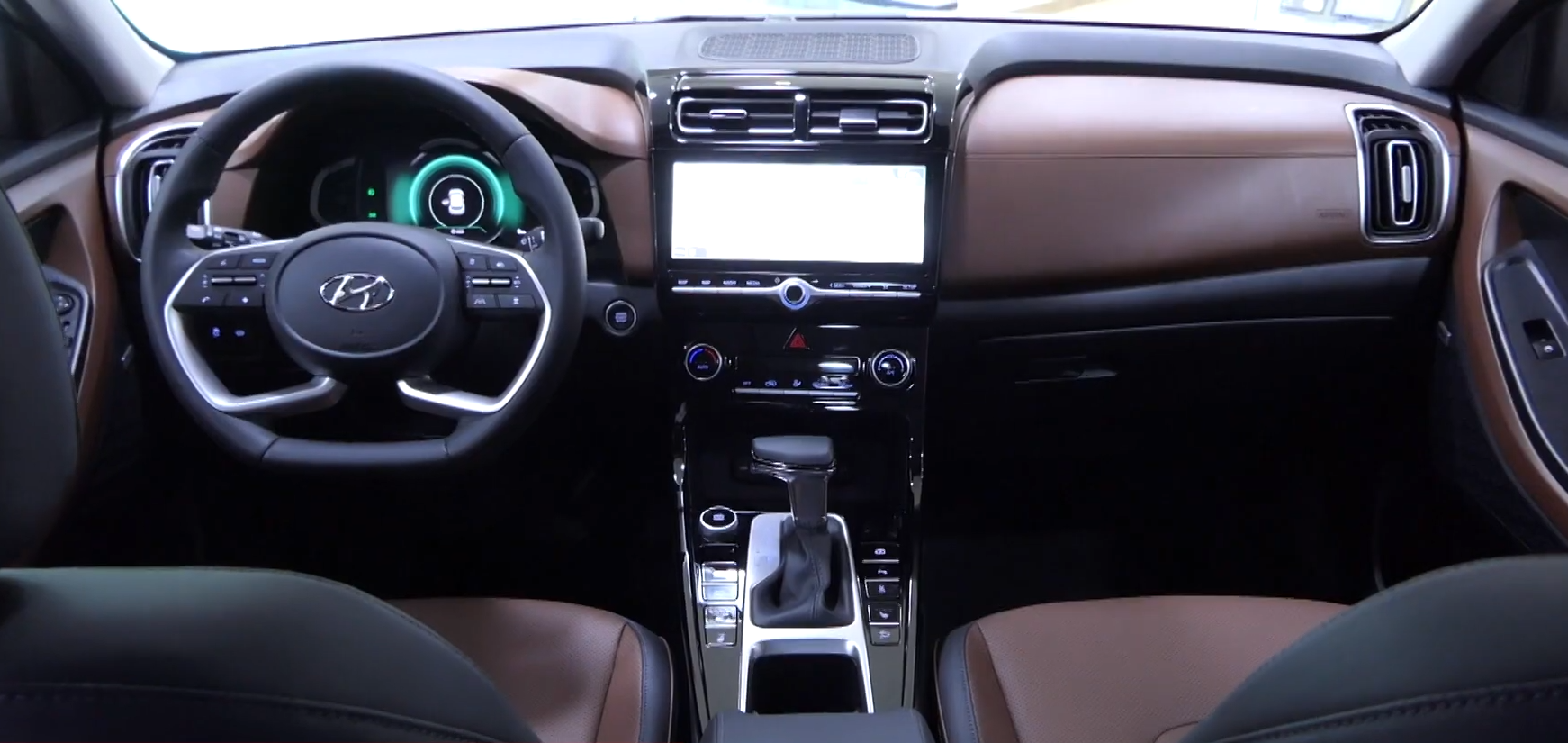
Interior

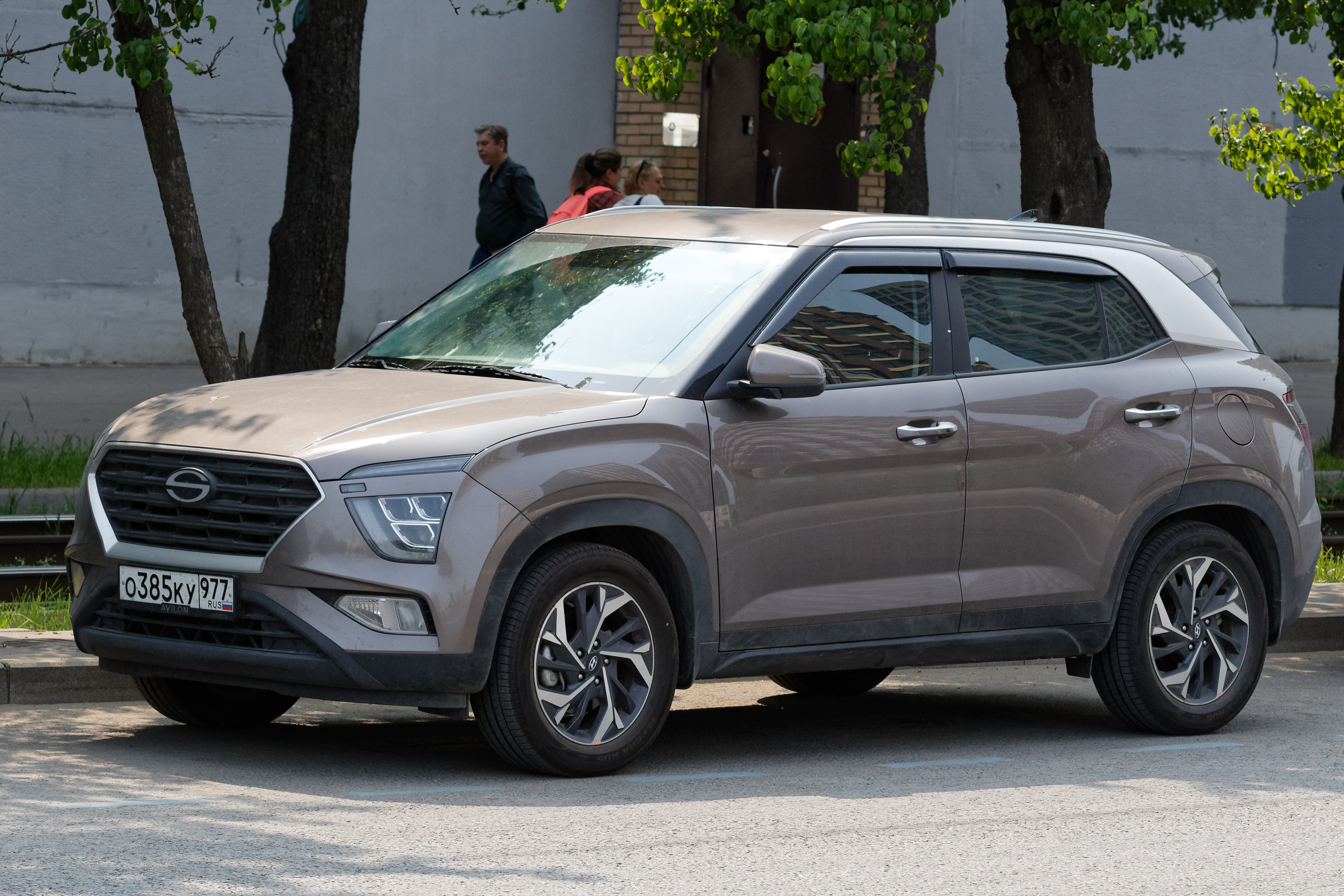
2025 Solaris HC (Moscow; front)

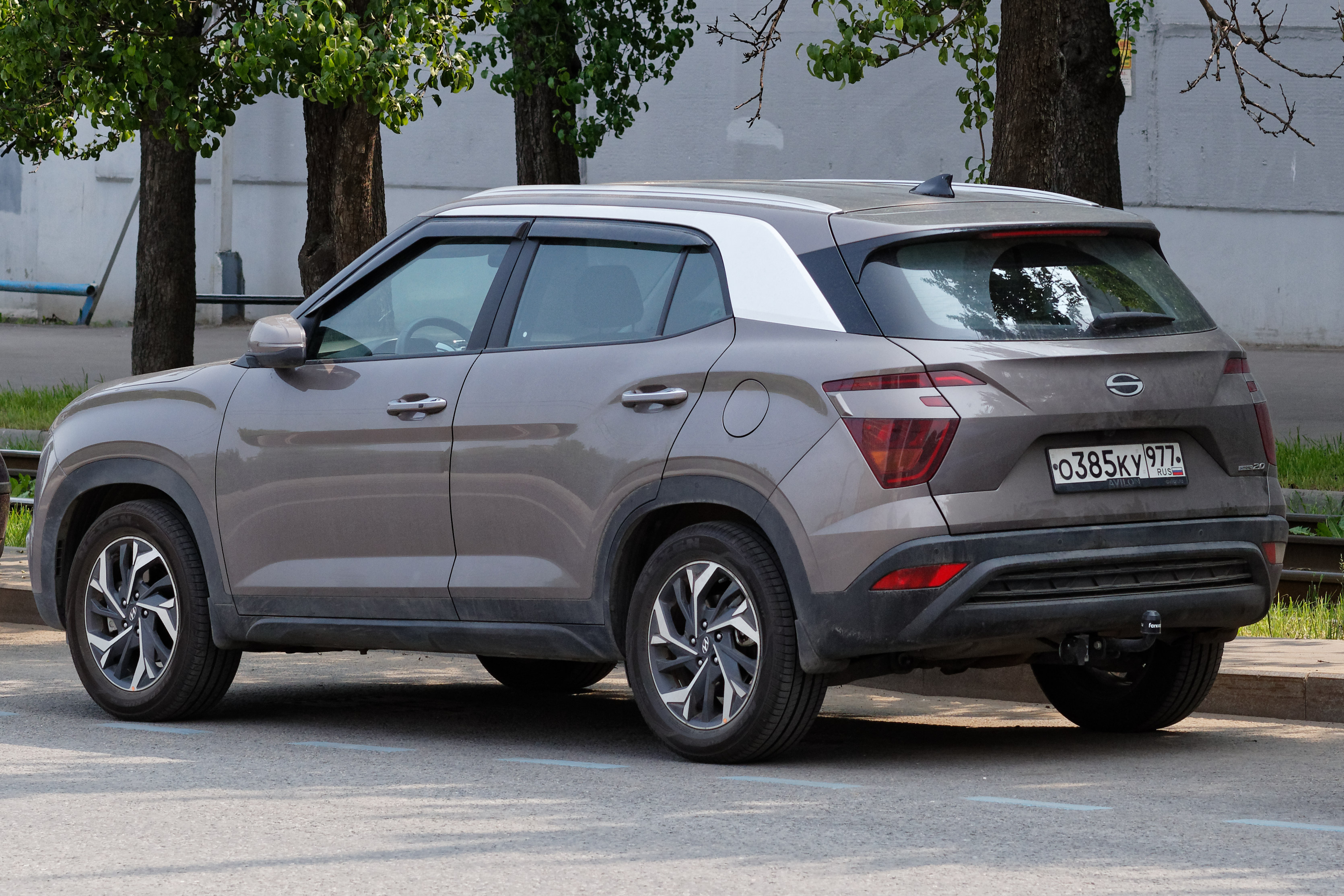
2025 Solaris HC (Moscow; rear)

==== South Africa ====
The second-generation Creta was released in South Africa in November 2020. Imported from India, engine options available were 1.5-litre petrol, 1.4-litre turbocharged petrol and 1.5-litre diesel. The two latter were dropped when the Indian-made model was replaced by the Indonesian-made Creta in July 2022, sporting the revised front fascia styling.

The facelifted Creta was launched in South Africa on 9 September 2026, with two trim levels: Premium and N Line. For engines, the Premium trim use the Smartstream 1.5-litre petrol engine paired with an IVT and the N Line trim use the Smartstream G 1.5-litre T-GDi petrol engine paired with a DCT.

==== Southeast Asia ====
===== Brunei =====
The second-generation Creta has been on sale in Brunei since 11 December 2020. Imported from India, engine options available were 1.5-litre petrol for the higher variant, 1.4-litre turbocharged petrol for the standard variant, and 1.5-litre diesel. The Indian-made Creta was replaced by the Indonesian-made model on 20 August 2022, which updated the revised front grille styling, and the two variants were in standard and high, only powered in 1.5-litre petrol with IVT.

===== Indonesia =====
The Indonesian market Creta (codename: SU2id) was unveiled in November 2021 at the 28th Gaikindo Indonesia International Auto Show. Produced at the newly built Hyundai Motor Manufacturing Indonesia (HMMI) plant in Cikarang, Bekasi, West Java, the Indonesian model sported the front fascia inspired by the fourth-generation Tucson, and is powered by a 1.5-litre Smartstream G1.5 MPi petrol engine, producing 115 PS (85 kW; 113 hp). For the Indonesian market, the Creta consist of four variants, namely Active, Trend, Style and Prime. Production started on 17 January 2022, and has been exported to several Southeast Asian markets, Middle East and Africa.

On 16 February 2023, Hyundai introduces a special edition variant for the Creta, based on the Trend type; Dynamic Black Edition. It was launched during the 30th Indonesia International Motor Show.

On 15 February 2024, the Dynamic Black Edition variant was replaced by the Alpha variant, based on the Prime type. The Alpha variant was launched during the 31st Indonesia International Motor Show.

The facelifted model was introduced on 9 January 2025, with an addition of the N Line variant. Alongside the 1.5-litre MPi petrol engine option, the N Line model is also available with an option of a 1.5-litre Smartstream G T-GDi petrol engine, producing 160 PS (118 kW; 158 hp).

A year after the release of the facelift version, the Alpha trim was released on 7 January 2026, marking the return of the Alpha trim since the pre-facelift.

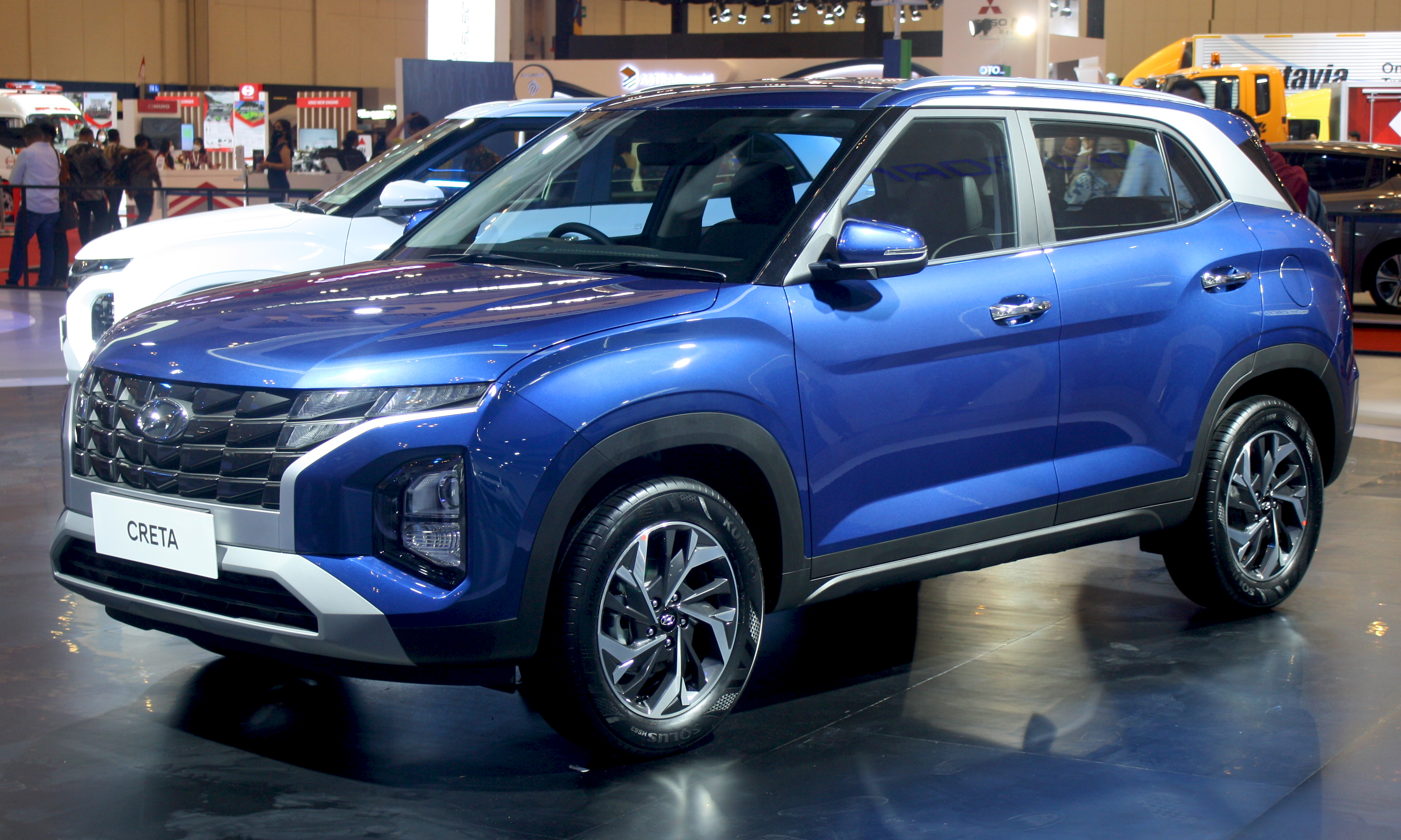
2021 Hyundai Creta 1.5 Trend (SU2id, Indonesia)

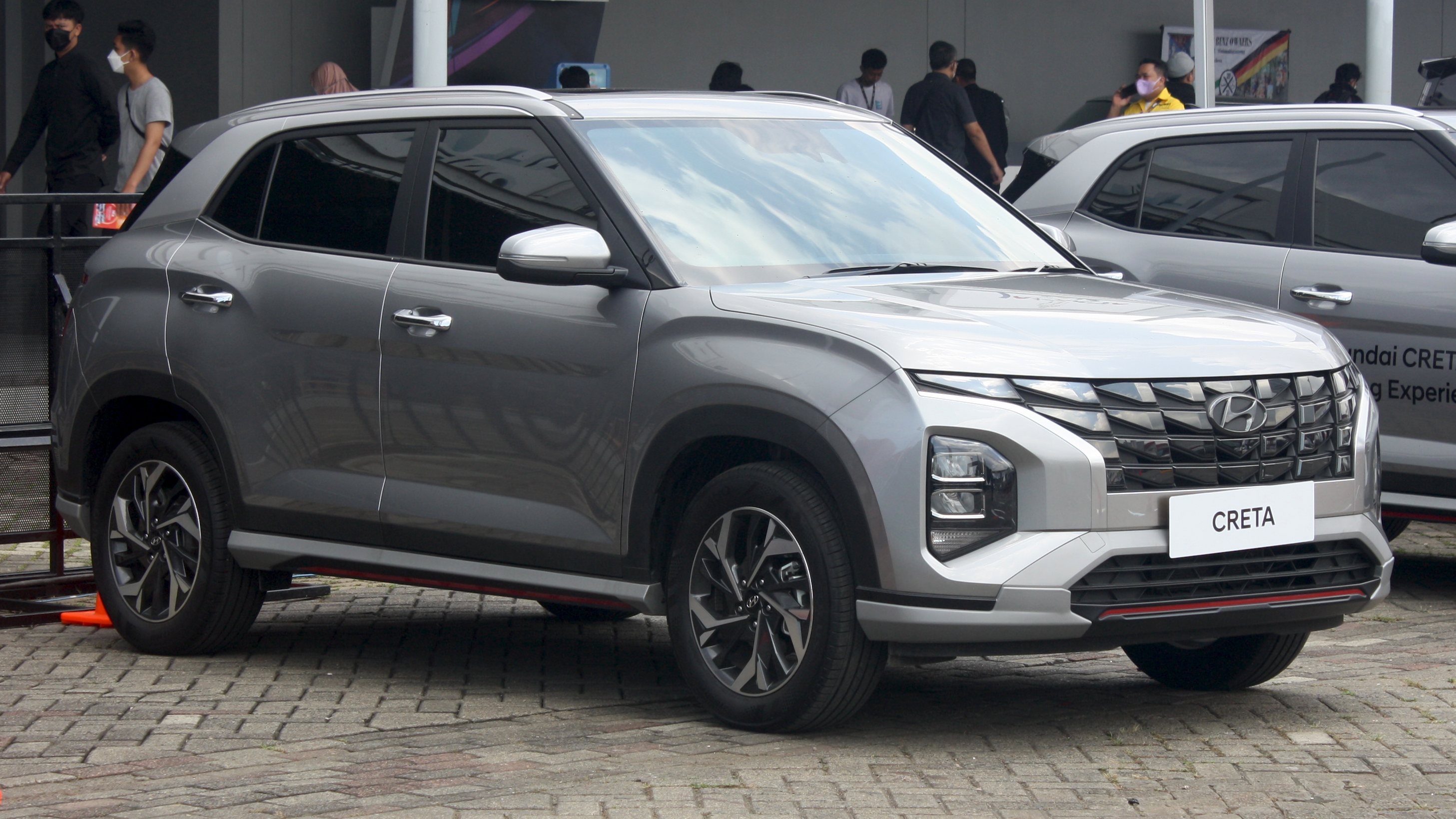
2022 Hyundai Creta 1.5 Prime (SU2id, Indonesia)

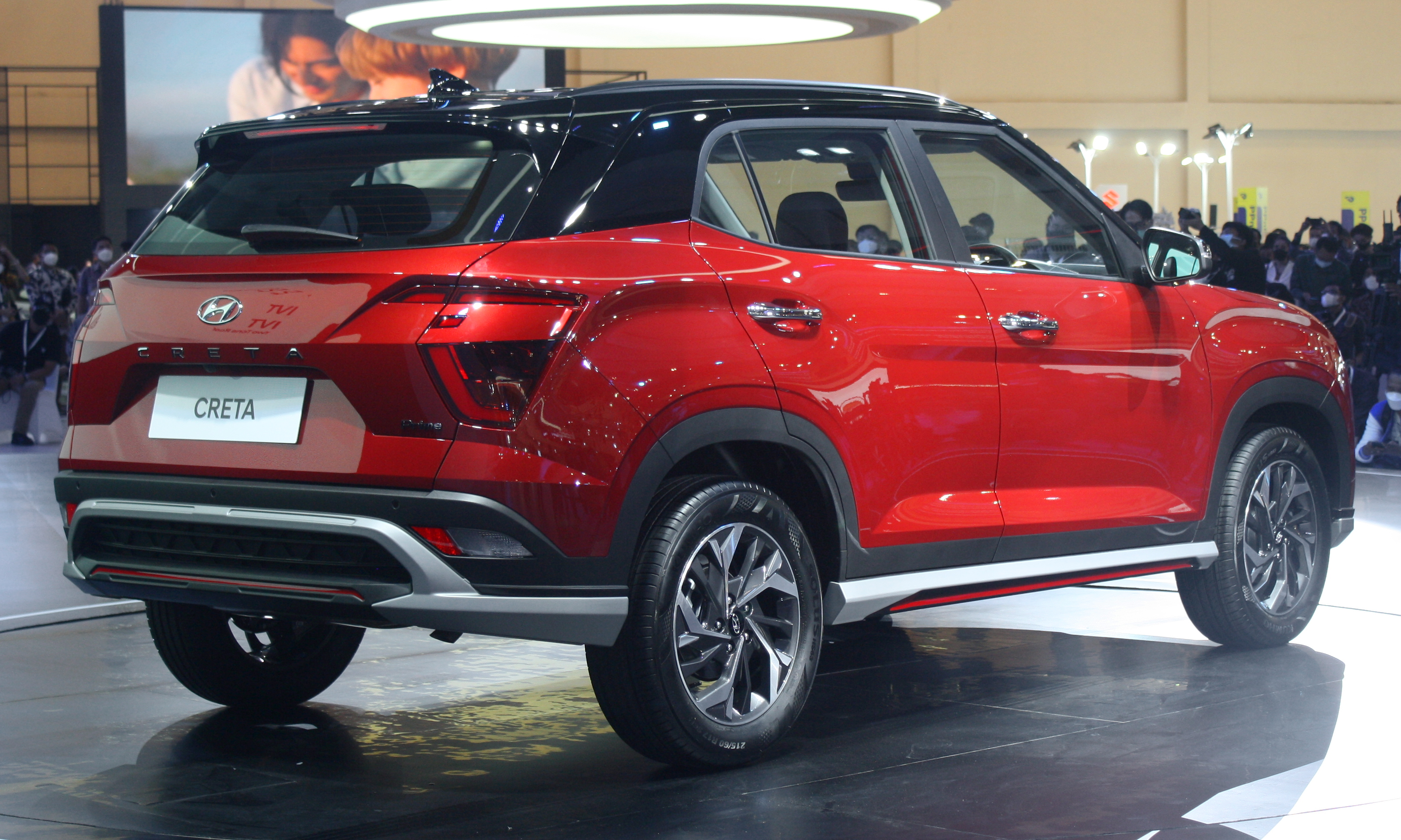
2021 Hyundai Creta 1.5 Prime (SU2id, Indonesia)

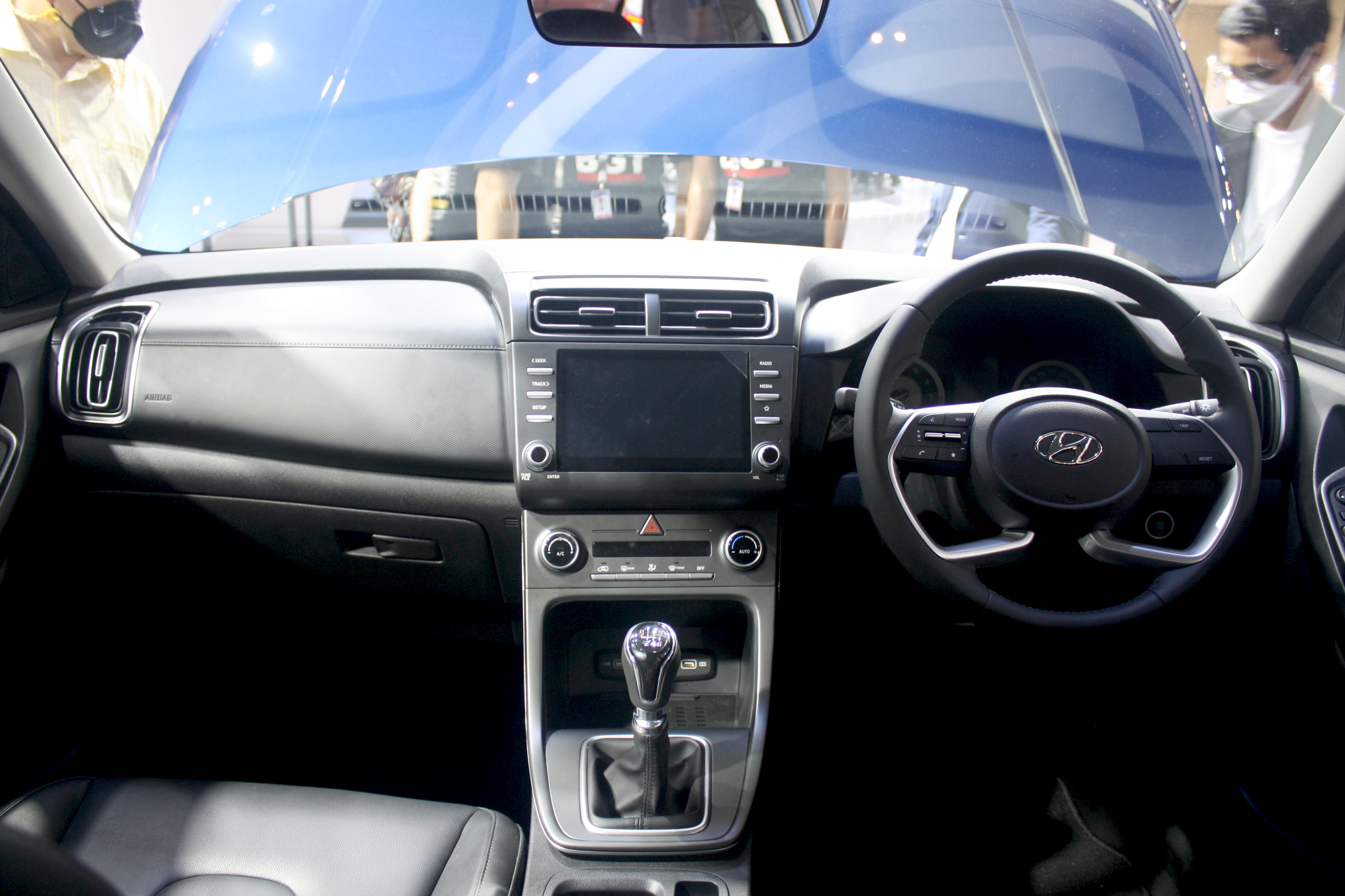
Interior (Trend)
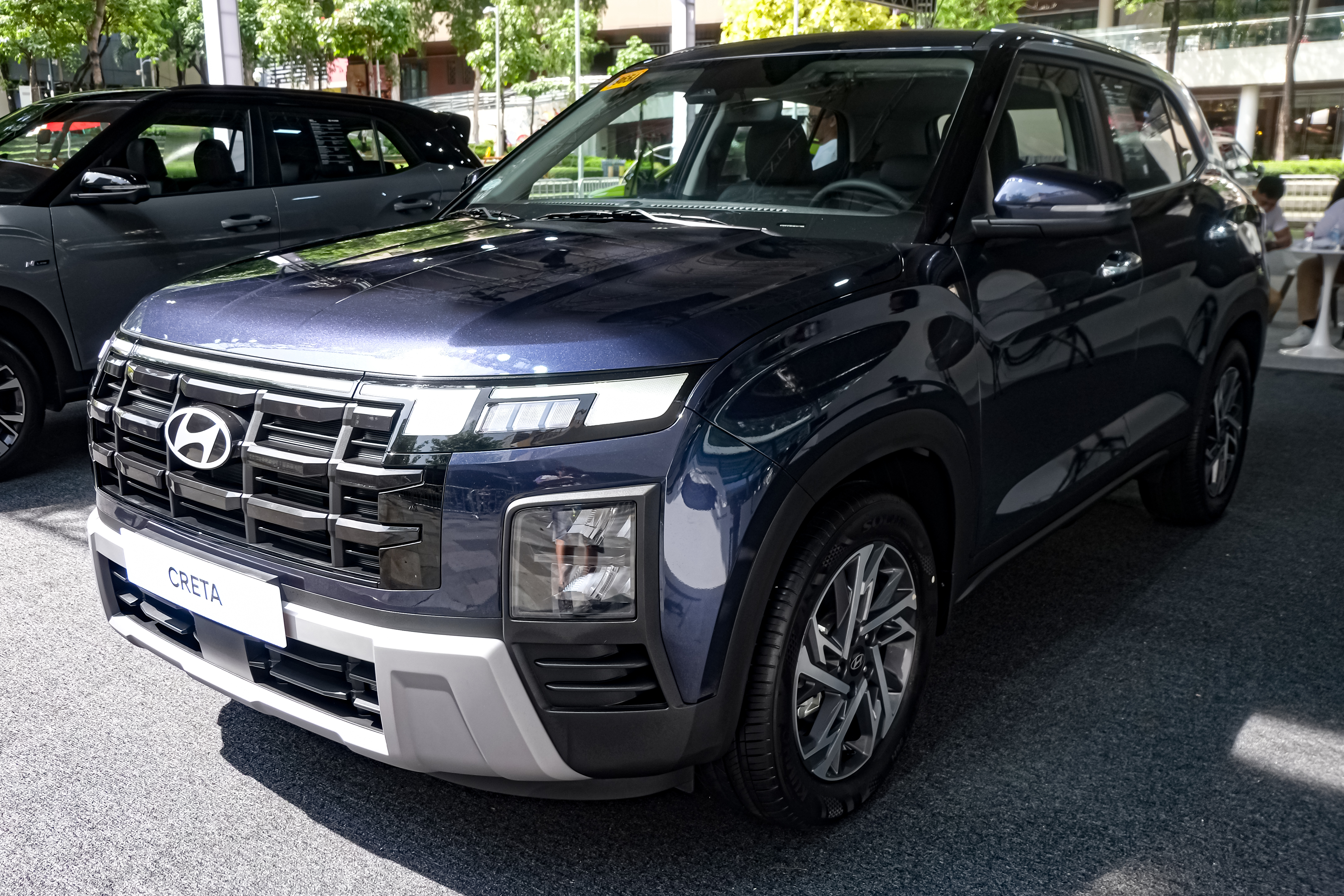
2025 Hyundai Creta Premium (SU2id, Philippines; facelift)

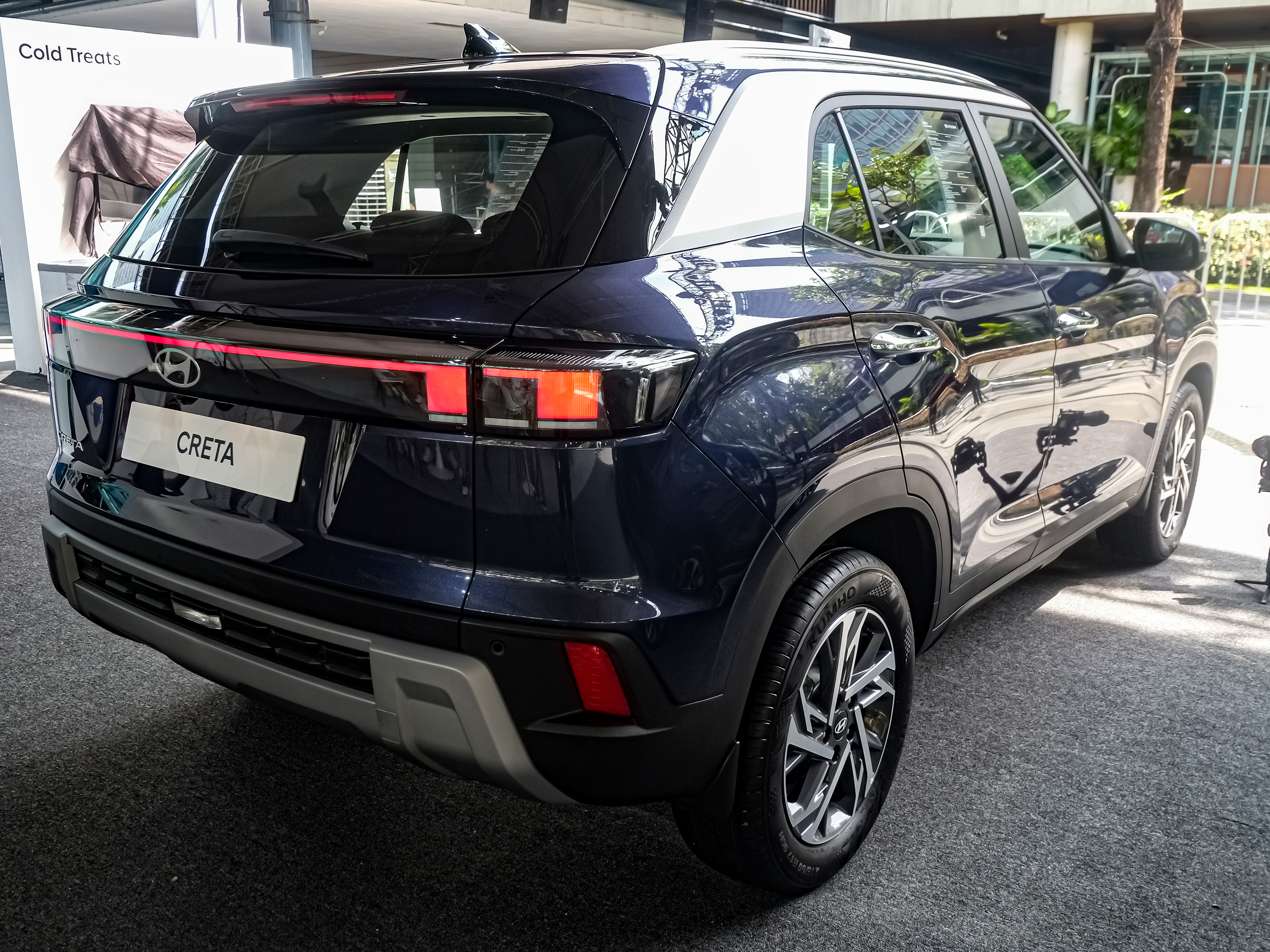
2025 Hyundai Creta Premium (SU2id, Philippines; facelift)

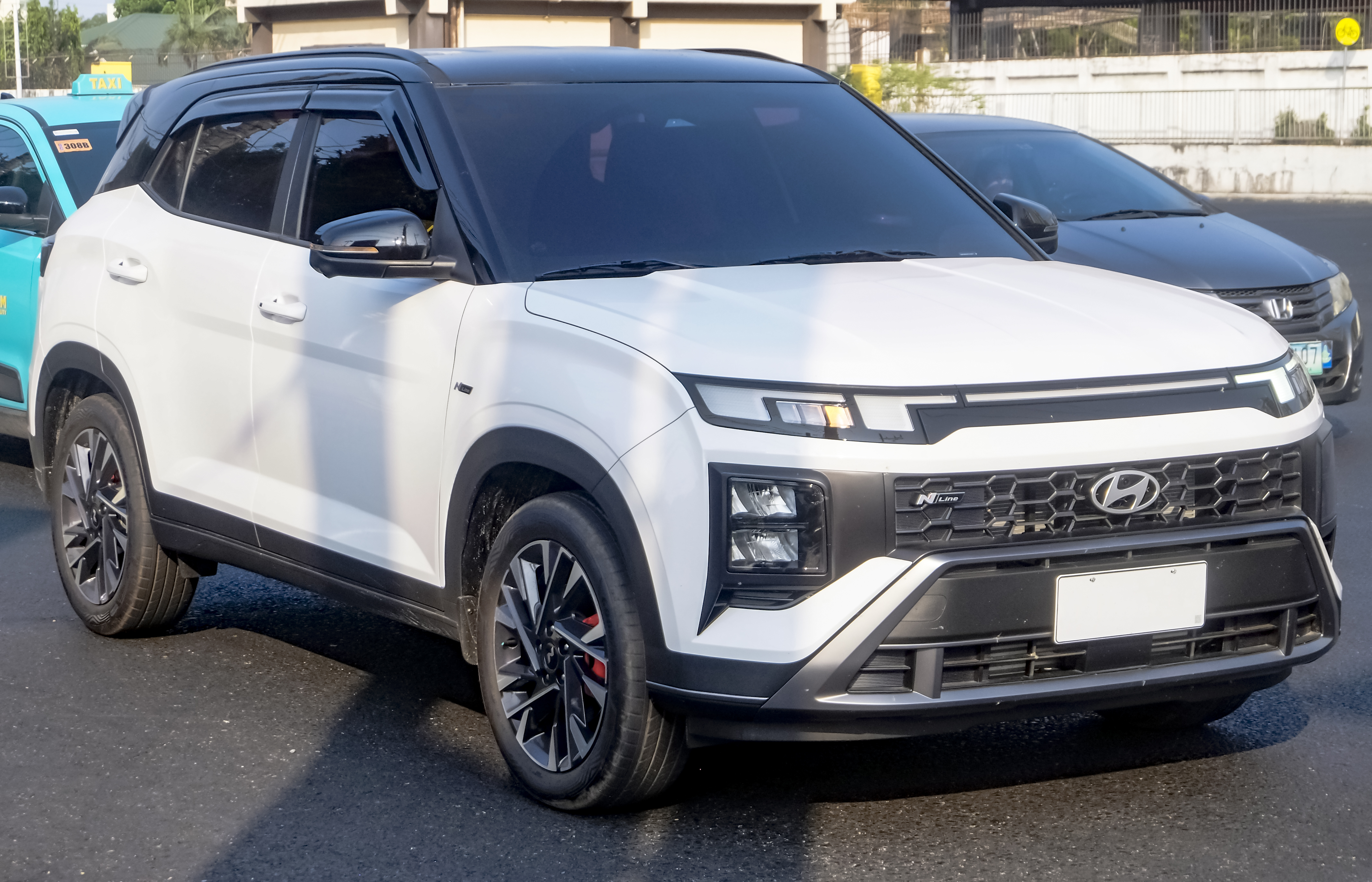
2025 Hyundai Creta N Line (SU2id, Philippines, facelift)

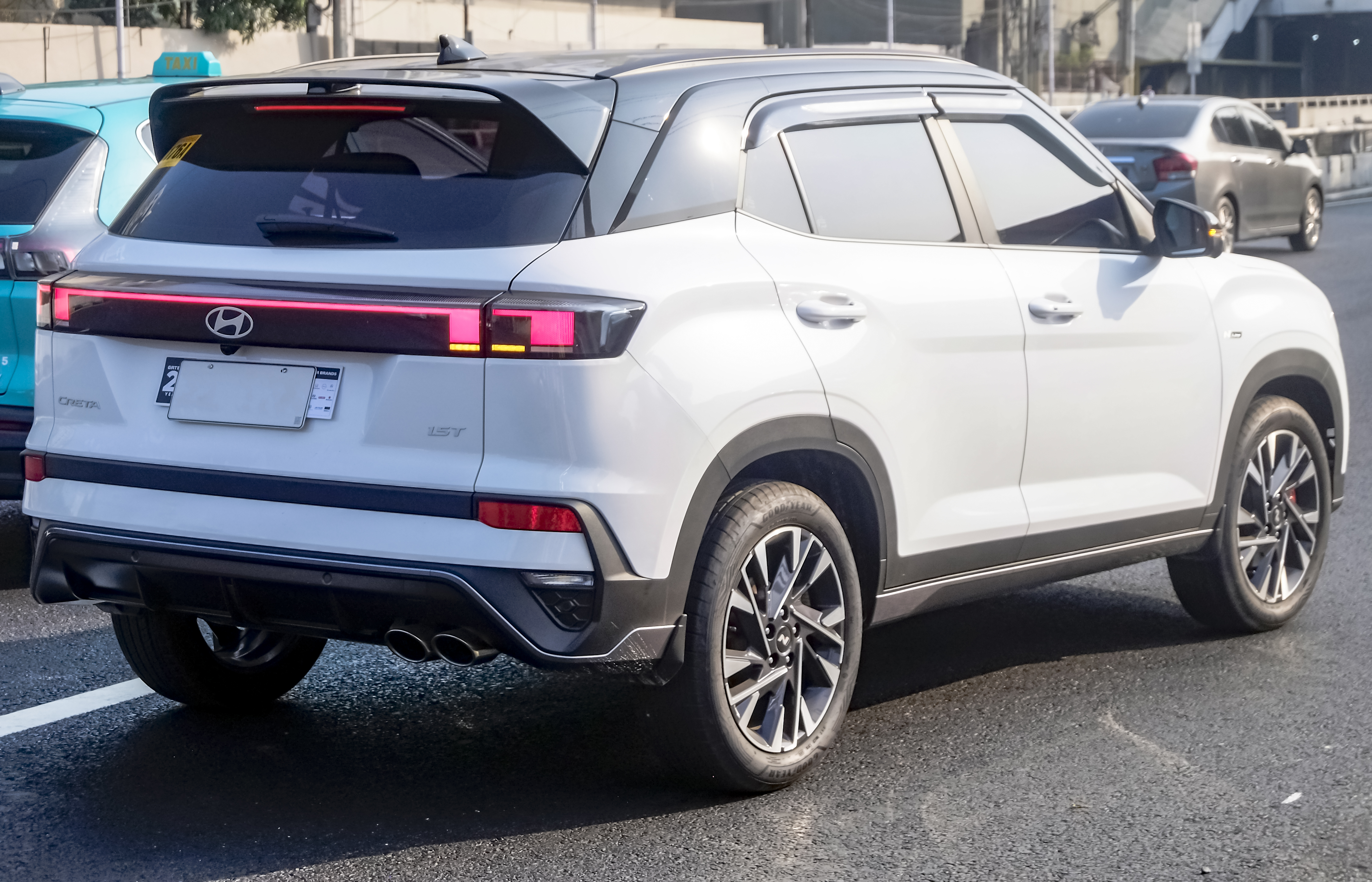
2025 Hyundai Creta N Line (SU2id, Philippines, facelift)

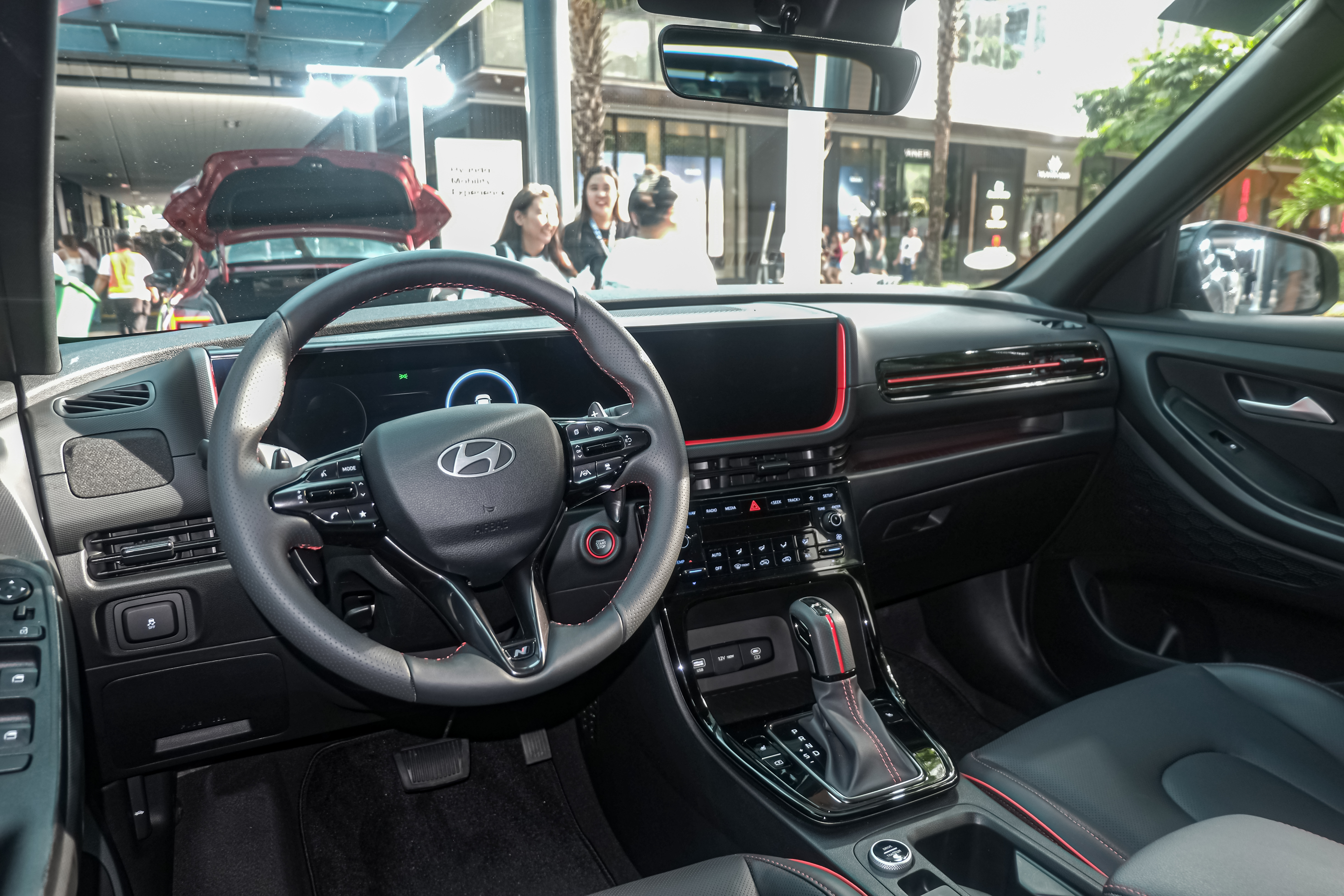
Interior (N Line)

===== Malaysia =====
The second-generation Creta was introduced in Malaysia on 28 April 2023. Imported from Indonesia, the model is offered in one single 'Plus' trim level, powered by the Smartstream 1.5-litre petrol engine.

===== Philippines =====
The second-generation Creta was introduced in the Philippines alongside the fourth-generation Tucson, facelifted Santa Fe and the Staria on 20 June 2022 and it became available on dealerships on 17 August 2022. It is offered in three grade levels: GL (manual and IVT), GL Limited (IVT), and the GLS (IVT), the Smartstream 1.5-litre petrol engine is standard on all grades, it replaced the petrol-powered Kona in the country.

The facelifted model was introduced in the Philippines on 27 May 2025, with four trim levels: GL, GLS, Limited and N-Line. For engines, it is powered by either Smartstream 1.5-litre petrol engine or the Smartstream G 1.5-litre T-GDi petrol engines, the latter option is only available for the N-Line trim.

===== Thailand =====
The second-generation Creta was introduced in Thailand on 17 March 2022. Imported from Indonesia, trim levels offered are SE and SEL with the Smartstream 1.5-litre petrol engine. The Creta was re-introduced on 5 July 2023, with four trim levels offered are Trend, Style, Style Plus and Smart. The limited-edition Creta Black Edition was available limited to 50 units. The special edition Creta Alpha went on sale on 23 August 2024 to replace the Black Edition model.

The facelifted model was introduced at Bangkok International Motor Show 2025 on 24 March 2025, with the sole N Line variant.

===== Vietnam =====
The second-generation Creta was introduced in Vietnam on 15 March 2022. It is imported from Indonesia and started local assembly in 2023. The Vietnamese-market Creta is offered in three trim levels: the entry-level Standard, the mid-grade Special and the top-spec Premium, it uses the Smartstream 1.5-litre petrol engine and indirectly replaced the Kona.

The facelifted model was introduced in Vietnam on 3 June 2025, with four variants: Standard, Special, Premium and N Line. The facelift model uses the same Smartstream 1.5-litre petrol engine from the pre-facelift model.

=== Safety ===
The Creta in its Indian specification is sold with two frontal airbags, antilock brakes, front seatbelt reminders and a tyre pressure monitor as standard equipment. Better equipped trim levels are equipped with electronic stability control, ISOFIX anchorages, front-seat side torso-protecting seat airbags and head-protecting curtains.

Global NCAP 1.0 test results (India) Hyundai Creta – 2 Airbags (H1 2022, similar to Latin NCAP 2013)
Test	Score	Stars
Adult occupant protection	8.00/17.00	3 /5 stars
Child occupant protection	28.29/49.00	3 /5 stars

Global NCAP 1.0 (similar to Latin NCAP 2013) crash-tested the Indian-market Hyundai Creta in its basic safety specification of two airbags and anti-lock brakes in H1 2022. The Creta narrowly achieved three stars for adult occupant protection in the offset deformable barrier test. Protection of the driver's head was rated only adequate.

The Creta received three stars for child occupant protection. It does not come with ISOFIX anchorages as standard or three-point seat belts for all seating positions. When using the child seats recommended by Hyundai for the test, the dynamic performance of the 18-month-old child was good; however, the head of the 3-year-old moved forward excessively.

ASEAN NCAP test results Hyundai Creta (2022)
Test	Points
Overall:	5 /5 stars
Adult occupant:	34.72
Child occupant:	15.56
Safety assist:	14.08
Motorcyclist Safety:	11.42

=== Powertrain ===
Creta (SU2) engine options
Petrol engines
Model	Engine	Power	Torque	Transmissions	0–100 km/h (0-62 mph) (official)	Top speed	Model
1.0 L Kappa II T-GDi	998 cc (60.9 cu in) turbocharged I3	120 PS (88 kW; 118 hp) @ 6,000 rpm	17.5 kg⋅m (172 N⋅m; 127 lb⋅ft) @ 1,500–3,500 rpm	6-speed automatic	11.5s (FWD)	180 km/h (112 mph)	SU2b
1.4 L Kappa II T-GDI	1,353 cc (82.6 cu in) turbocharged I4	140 PS (103 kW; 138 hp) @ 6,000 rpm	24.7 kg⋅m (242 N⋅m; 179 lb⋅ft) @ 1,500–3,200 rpm	6-speed manual			SU2i (2020–2023)
1.4 L Kappa II T-GDI	1,353 cc (82.6 cu in) turbocharged I4	140 PS (103 kW; 138 hp) @ 6,000 rpm	24.7 kg⋅m (242 N⋅m; 179 lb⋅ft) @ 1,500–3,200 rpm	7-speed DCT	9.7s	185 km/h (115 mph)	SU2i (2020–2023)
1.5 L Smartstream G1.5 MPi	1,497 cc (91.4 cu in) I4	115 PS (85 kW; 113 hp) @ 6,300 rpm	14.7 kg⋅m (144 N⋅m; 106 lb⋅ft) @ 4,500 rpm	6-speed manual	12.2s	170 km/h (106 mph)	SU2c; SU2i; SU2id
1.5 L Smartstream G1.5 MPi	1,497 cc (91.4 cu in) I4	115 PS (85 kW; 113 hp) @ 6,300 rpm	14.7 kg⋅m (144 N⋅m; 106 lb⋅ft) @ 4,500 rpm	CVT	12.0s	170 km/h (106 mph)	SU2c; SU2i; SU2id
1.5 L Smartstream G1.5 T-GDI	1,482 cc (90.4 cu in) turbocharged I4	160 PS (118 kW; 158 hp) @ 5,500 rpm	25.8 kg⋅m (253 N⋅m; 187 lb⋅ft) @ 1,500–3,500 rpm	6-speed manual			SU2i (2024–present); SU2id (2025-present)
1.5 L Smartstream G1.5 T-GDI	1,482 cc (90.4 cu in) turbocharged I4	160 PS (118 kW; 158 hp) @ 5,500 rpm	25.8 kg⋅m (253 N⋅m; 187 lb⋅ft) @ 1,500–3,500 rpm	7-speed DCT			SU2i (2024–present); SU2id (2025-present)
1.6 L Gamma MPi	1,591 cc (97.1 cu in) I4	121 PS (89 kW; 119 hp) @ 6,200 rpm	15.1 kg⋅m (148 N⋅m; 109 lb⋅ft) @ 4,850 rpm	6-speed manual	11.8s (FWD); 12.5s (AWD)		SU2r
1.6 L Gamma MPi	1,591 cc (97.1 cu in) I4	123 PS (90 kW; 121 hp) @ 6,300 rpm	15.4 kg⋅m (151 N⋅m; 111 lb⋅ft) @ 4,850 rpm	6-speed automatic	11.6s (FWD); 12.0s (AWD)		SU2r
2.0 L Nu MPi	1,999 cc (122.0 cu in) I4	149 PS (110 kW; 147 hp) @ 6,200 rpm	19.5 kg⋅m (191 N⋅m; 141 lb⋅ft) @ 4,500 rpm	6-speed automatic	10.2s (FWD); 10.9s (AWD)		SU2r
2.0 L Smartstream G2.0 MPi	1,999 cc (122.0 cu in) I4	159 PS (117 kW; 157 hp) @ 6,200 rpm 169 PS (124 kW; 167 hp) @ 6,200 rpm	19.2 kg⋅m (188 N⋅m; 139 lb⋅ft) @ 4,700 rpm 20.6 kg⋅m (202 N⋅m; 149 lb⋅ft) @ 4,700 rpm	6-speed automatic	9.3s (FWD)	180 km/h (112 mph)	SU2b
Diesel engine
Model	Engine	Power	Torque	Transmissions	0–100 km/h (0-62 mph) (official)	Top speed	Model
1.5 L U II CRDi VGT	1,493 cc (91.1 cu in) turbocharged I4	115 PS (85 kW; 113 hp) @ 4,000 rpm	22.5 kg⋅m (221 N⋅m; 163 lb⋅ft) @ 1,500–2,750 rpm	6-speed manual	11.3s	173 km/h (107 mph)	SU2i
1.5 L U II CRDi VGT	1,493 cc (91.1 cu in) turbocharged I4	115 PS (85 kW; 113 hp) @ 4,000 rpm	25.5 kg⋅m (250 N⋅m; 184 lb⋅ft) @ 1,500–2,750 rpm	6-speed automatic	11.7s	173 km/h (107 mph)	SU2i

=== Alcazar / Grand Creta ===
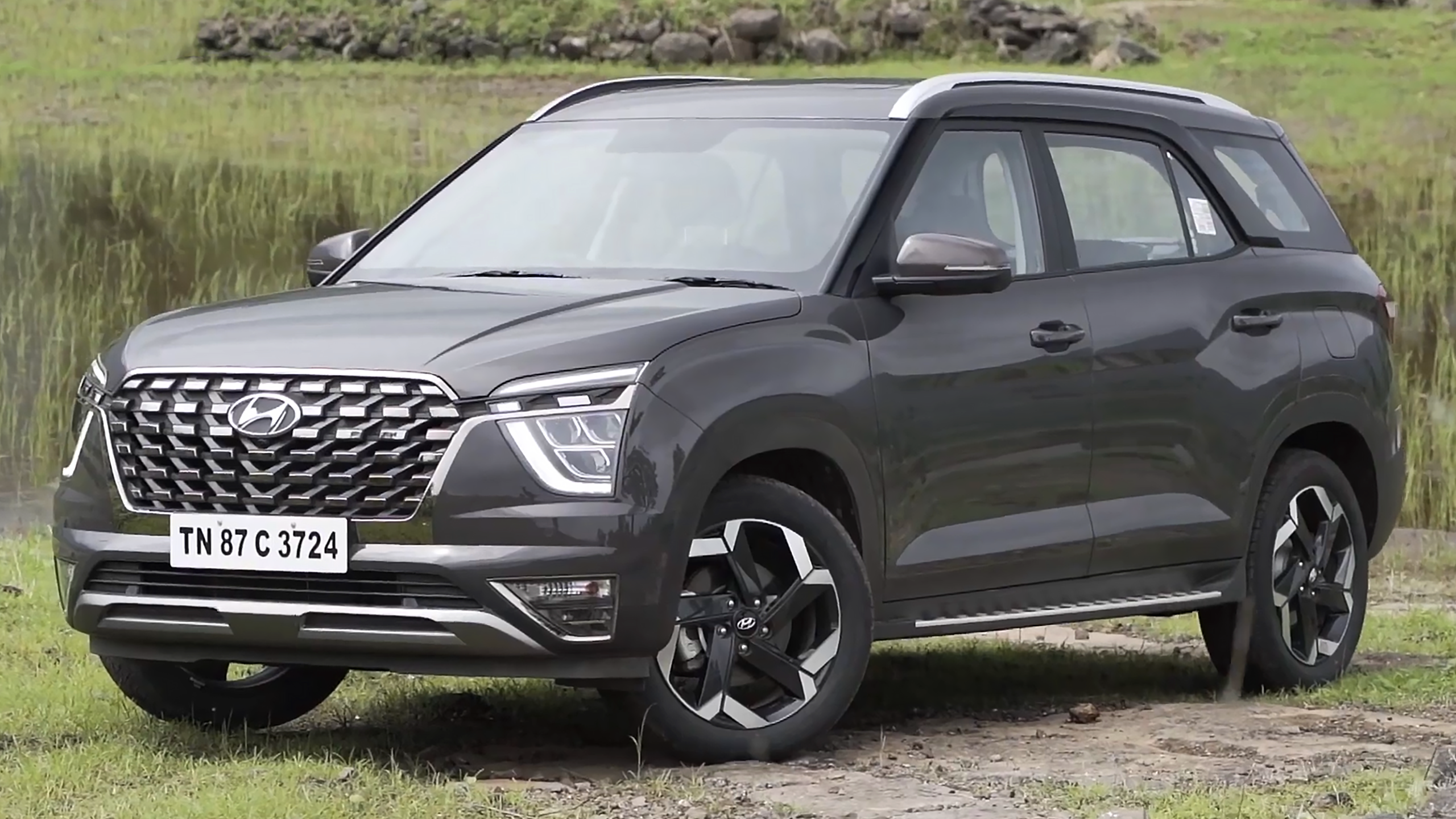
2021 Hyundai Alcazar 2.0 Signature (India)

In June 2021, Hyundai introduced a long-wheelbase, three-row version of the Creta as the Hyundai Alcazar in India, as the Hyundai Creta Grand in Mexico and as the Hyundai Grand Creta elsewhere. Produced in India (codename: SU2i LWB), it features a reworked front styling, 6-seater and 7-seater options, and available with a 2.0-litre Nu petrol engine or a 1.5-litre diesel engine.

== Sales ==
Year	India	Brazil	Russia	China	Mexico	South Africa	Indonesia	Vietnam	Thailand
2014				24,721					
2015	40,952			102,755					
2016	92,926		21,929	113,468					
2017	105,484	41,629	55,305	48,720					
2018	120,905	48,982	67,588	75,553	8,769				
2019	99,736	57,471	71,487	42,879	9,144				
2020	96,989	47,760	73,537	38,297	8,634	2,353			
2021	125,437	64,764	68,081	16,201	10,025	4,113			
2022	140,895	62,572	16,577		11,962	2,218	15,930	12,096	666
2023	157,311	65,826			16,447	1,690	8,315	10,719	392
2024	186,919	69,108			18,558		5,052	8,640	359
2025	201,122	76,168			21,547		5,220		145

== See also ==
- List of Hyundai vehicles
