= Hyundai Motor Manufacturing Czech =

Czech automobile manufacturer

- Native name: Hyundai Motor Manufacturing Czech s.r.o.
- Type: Subsidiary
- Industry: Automotive industry
- Founded: 7 July 2006; 20 years ago
- Headquarters: Nižní Lhoty, Czech Republic
- Products: Passenger cars
- Production output: 276,175 vehicles (2025)
- Revenue: CZK 159.71 billion (2025)
- Net income: CZK 4.32 billion (2025)
- Number of employees: Approximately 2,800 (2026)
- Parent: Hyundai Motor Company
- Website: www.hyundai-motor.cz/en/

Hyundai Motor Manufacturing Czech s.r.o. (HMMC) is a Czech automobile manufacturer wholly owned by Hyundai Motor Company. Established in 2006, it operates a factory in the Nošovice industrial zone in the Moravian-Silesian Region. Vehicle production began in November 2008.

It is Hyundai's only vehicle manufacturing plant in the European Union. The factory manufactures the Tucson, i30 and Kona Electric. In 2025, it produced 276,175 vehicles.

== History ==
Hyundai signed an investment agreement with the Czech government on 18 May 2006, committing to invest up to €1 billion in the factory. HMMC was incorporated on 7 July that year. The development faced opposition from local residents and environmental organisations. In November 2006, Hyundai, public authorities and several organisations reached an agreement on reducing the factory's environmental impact and funding local projects.

In May 2007, the European Commission approved €111 million in Czech state aid for the project, covering a grant and land sold at a reduced price. Hyundai invested €1.1 billion in the factory, which started producing the i30 on 3 November 2008. It also made manual gearboxes, some of which were supplied to Kia's Slovak factory.

Other models manufactured at the plant have included the Hyundai ix35 and ix20 and the Kia Venga. Production of the third-generation Tucson began in 2015.

Production of the Kona Electric began in March 2020, followed by its second generation in August 2023. Hyundai Mobis began assembling batteries in the former Transmission Shop No. 2, where gearbox production had ended in 2021. HMMC ended its remaining manual-transmission production in February 2024. The other transmission hall was converted for battery assembly in summer 2025.

The factory produced its five-millionth vehicle on 29 January 2026. In October that year, Hyundai announced that production of the fifth-generation Tucson was scheduled to begin there in December.

== Production ==
The Nošovice plant presses and welds steel body panels, paints the bodies and assembles the finished cars. The Kona Electric is built on the same assembly line as combustion-engine models. Some components arrive by conveyor from suppliers on the site, while finished cars leave by road or rail.

Hyundai Mobis operates battery-system assembly facilities at the site, supplying HMMC and Kia's factory in Žilina, Slovakia. Battery packs for the Kona Electric are assembled locally using cells manufactured by LG Energy Solution in Poland.

Engineers at HMMC test prototype vehicles and work with Hyundai's designers in Germany and South Korea to resolve problems before mass production. The factory also uses digital twins to plan production lines for new models.
