= Hyundai Kona =

Subcompact crossover SUV

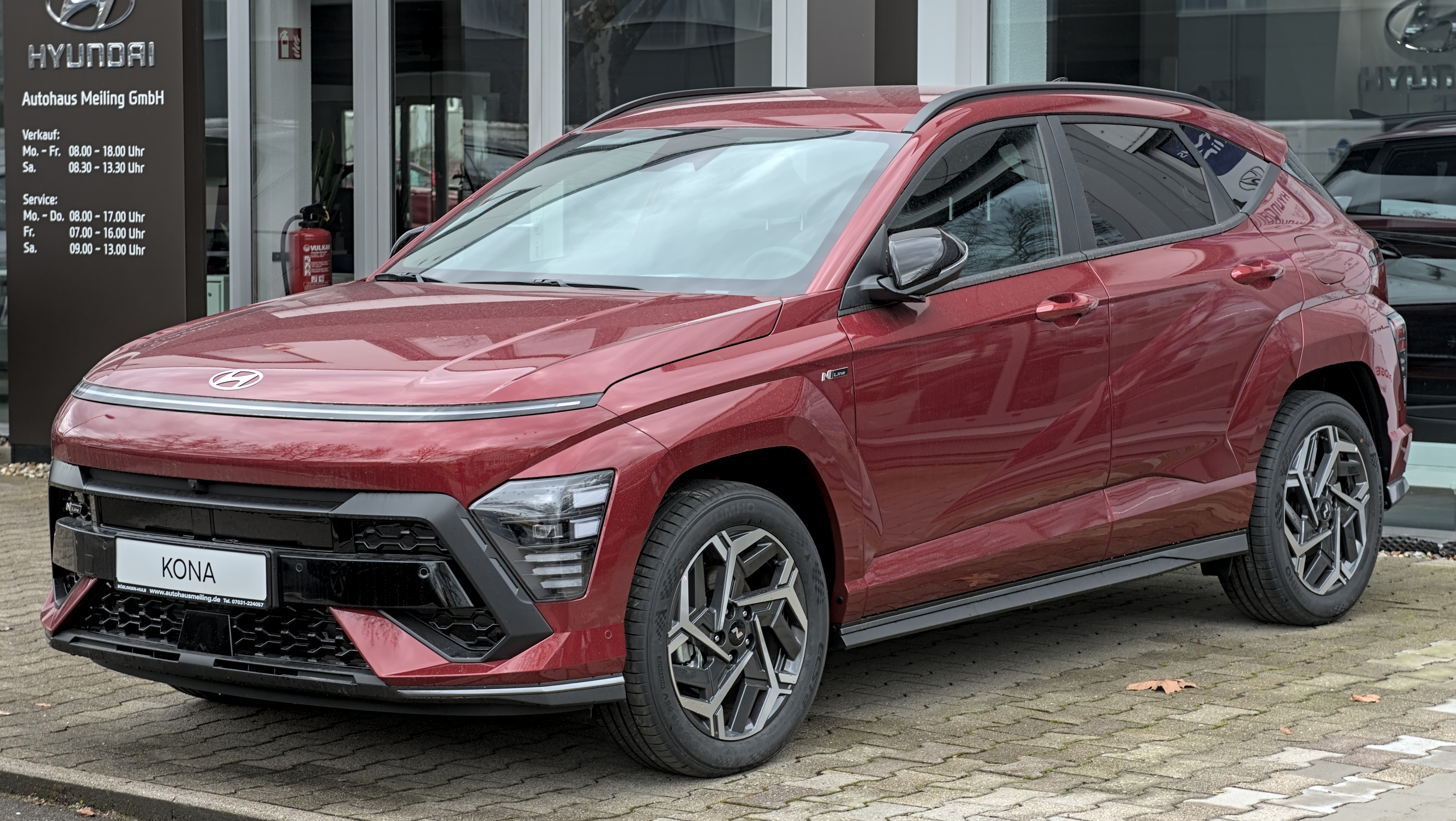
- Hyundai Kona N Line (SX2)

Overview
- Manufacturer: Hyundai
- Also called: Hyundai Kauai (Portugal.2017~); Hyundai Encino (China, 2018-2020)
- Production: 2017–present
- Model years: 2018–present

Body and chassis
- Class: Subcompact crossover SUV
- Body style: 5-door SUV
- Layout: Front-engine, front-wheel-drive; Front-engine, all-wheel-drive; Front-motor, front-wheel-drive (electric)

The Hyundai Kona (Korean: 현대 코나) is a subcompact crossover SUV produced by the South Korean manufacturer Hyundai. The first-generation Kona debuted in June 2017 and the production version was revealed later that year. The current, second-generation model was revealed in December 2022 and launched in 2023. It was developed first as a battery-electric model before being adapted for petrol and hybrid variants, which are offered depending on the market. Depending on the market, the Kona is positioned above either the Venue or the Bayon and below the Tucson in Hyundai's crossover SUV line-up. The battery-electric version, called the Kona Electric or Kona EV, was first launched in South Korea during the first half of 2018 and was rolled out gradually worldwide afterwards.

== Naming ==
The Kona is named after the western district of the island of Hawaiʻi. The company stated the name "reflects the lifestyle of modern customers", in line with its "progressive design" that it adopts. The Kona naming also continues Hyundai's tradition of naming crossover SUV models after famous travel destinations, including the Creta, Santa Fe, Tucson and Veracruz.

The vehicle is marketed in Portugal as the Hyundai Kauai, as Kona is too similar to cona, a slang word for the female genitalia in European Portuguese (in Brazil, the name Kona was kept). Like Kona, Kauai is a place in Hawaii.

In China, the vehicle was sold as the Hyundai Encino.

== First generation (OS; 2017) ==
First generation
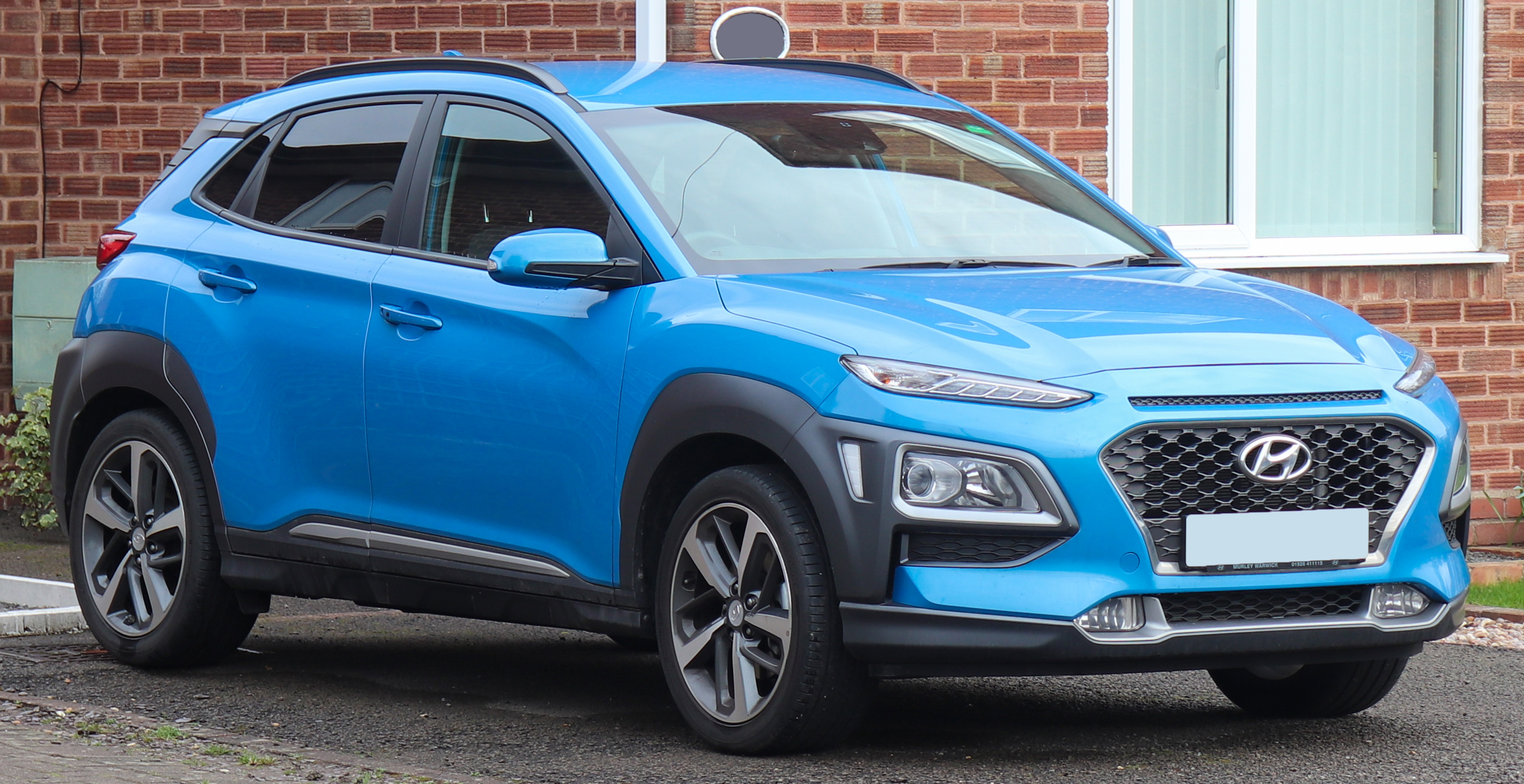

Overview
- Model code: OS
- Also called: Hyundai Kauai (Portugal); Hyundai Encino (China)
- Production: 2017–2023; 2018–2020 (China)
- Model years: 2018–2023
- Assembly: South Korea: Ulsan (Ulsan Plant 1); China: Beijing (Beijing Hyundai); Czech Republic: Nošovice (HMMC, electric only); India: Chennai (HMIL, electric only); Vietnam: Ninh Bình (HTMV); Algeria: Tiaret (TMC)
- Designer: Kim Sung-No

Body and chassis
- Platform: Hyundai-Kia K1/K2-P2
- Related: Kia Seltos (SP2); Hyundai i30 (PD)

Powertrain
- Engine: Petrol: 1.0 L Kappa II T-GDi I3; 1.0 L Smartstream G1.0 T-GDi I3 (Mild hybrid); 1.6 L Gamma T-GDi I4; 1.6 L Smartstream G1.6 T-GDi I4; 2.0 L Nu MPi I4; 2.0 L Smartstream G2.0 MPi I4; 2.0 L Theta II T-GDi I4; Petrol hybrid: 1.6 L Kappa II GDi HEV I4; 1.6 L Smartstream G1.6 Hybrid GDi HEV I4; Diesel: 1.6 L U II CRDi I4; 1.6 L Smartstream D1.6 CRDi I4
- Electric motor: Permanent magnet synchronous motor (hybrid and electric)
- Transmission: 6-speed manual; 6-speed A6F22 automatic; 6-speed D6KF1 DCT (hybrid); 7-speed D7UF1 DCT; 8-speed D8LF1 DCT; CVT; Single-speed (electric)
- Hybrid drivetrain: Mild hybrid (1.0L I3) Hybrid (Hybrid) Electric (Kona Electric)
- Battery: 1.56 kWh lithium-ion polymer battery (hybrid); 39.2 or 64 kWh lithium-ion polymer battery (electric)

Dimensions
- Wheelbase: 2,600 mm (102.4 in)
- Length: 4,165–4,215 mm (164.0–165.9 in)
- Width: 1,800 mm (70.9 in)
- Height: 1,550–1,575 mm (61.0–62.0 in)
- Curb weight: 1,233–1,569 kg (2,718–3,459 lb); 1,535–1,743 kg (3,384–3,843 lb) (electric)

Chronology
- Successor: Hyundai Creta Electric (India, electric)

The first-generation Kona was revealed in June 2017 in Seoul, South Korea. Positioned below the Tucson, it was the smallest crossover SUV in the Hyundai global line-up until that position was taken by the Venue in 2019. The first-generation Kona was built on a newly developed B-segment SUV platform derived from the Hyundai i30 platform which was designed to accommodate a range of powertrains, including fuel cell and electric variants. While it was developed as an urban-oriented crossover SUV, the first-generation Kona was available in front-wheel-drive and all-wheel-drive variants; the rear suspension is a torsion beam for the former and a dual-arm multi-link configuration for the latter.

For the North American market, the Kona was launched at the Los Angeles Auto Show in November 2017 and was available at Hyundai dealers in the first quarter of 2018 for the 2018 model year. Engine options offered are 2.0-litre 4-cylinder Atkinson cycle engine capable of 147 hp (149 PS; 110 kW) and 132 lb⋅ft (179 N⋅m; 18.2 kg⋅m), paired with a 6-speed automatic transmission. Higher trims are powered with a 1.6-litre Gamma turbo engine paired with a 7-speed dual-clutch transmission producing 175 hp (177 PS; 130 kW) and 195 lb⋅ft (264 N⋅m; 27.0 kg⋅m).

The Kona is either not sold or only sold in low volumes in markets where the simpler Creta is offered, such as Latin America, India, and Russia. Southeast Asian countries such as Indonesia, the Philippines and Vietnam are the few countries that briefly sold the petrol-powered Kona before it was indirectly replaced by the Indonesian-built Creta in 2022. The Chinese market had both the Kona and Creta, named there the Encino and ix25 respectively.

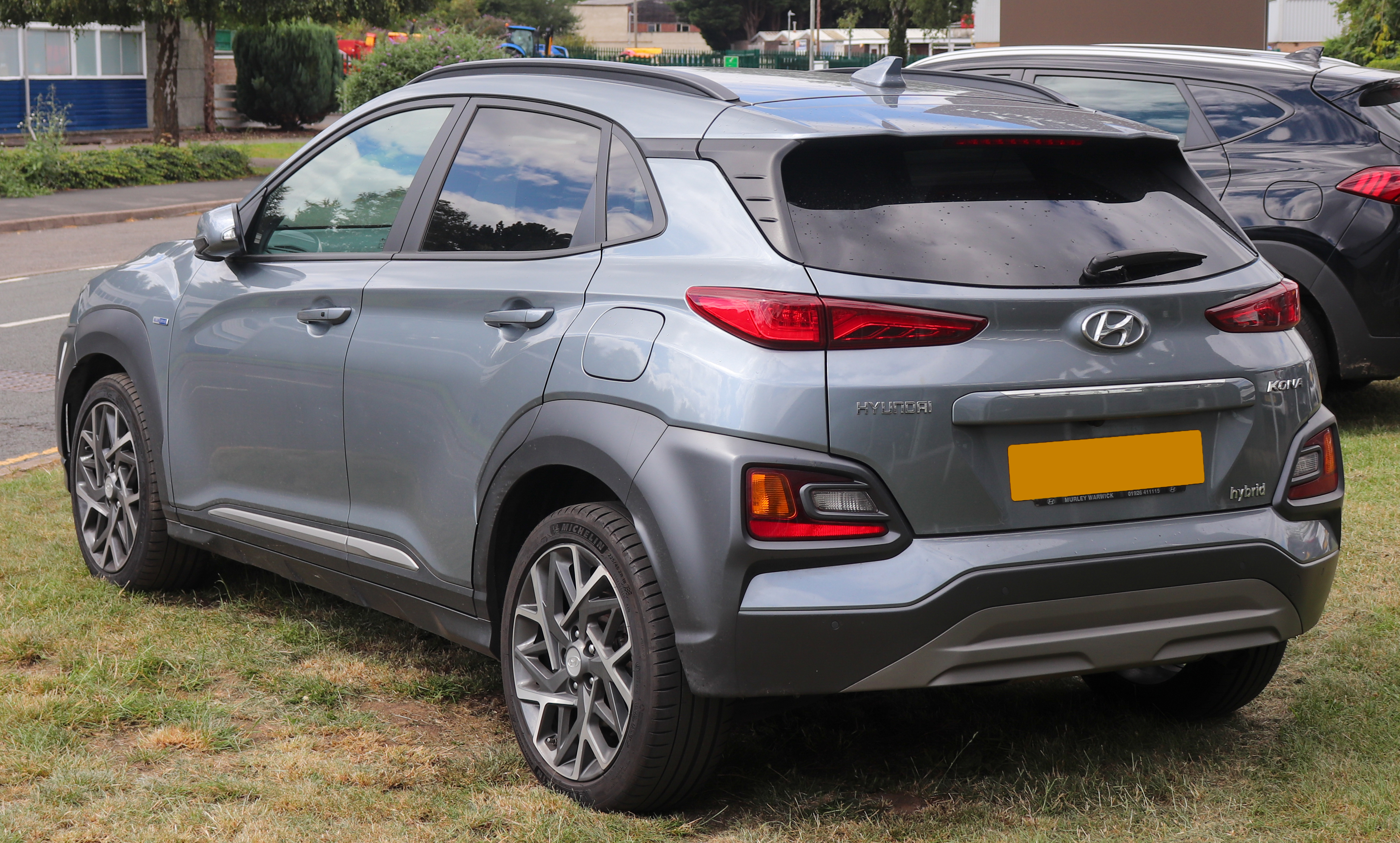
Rear (pre-facelift)

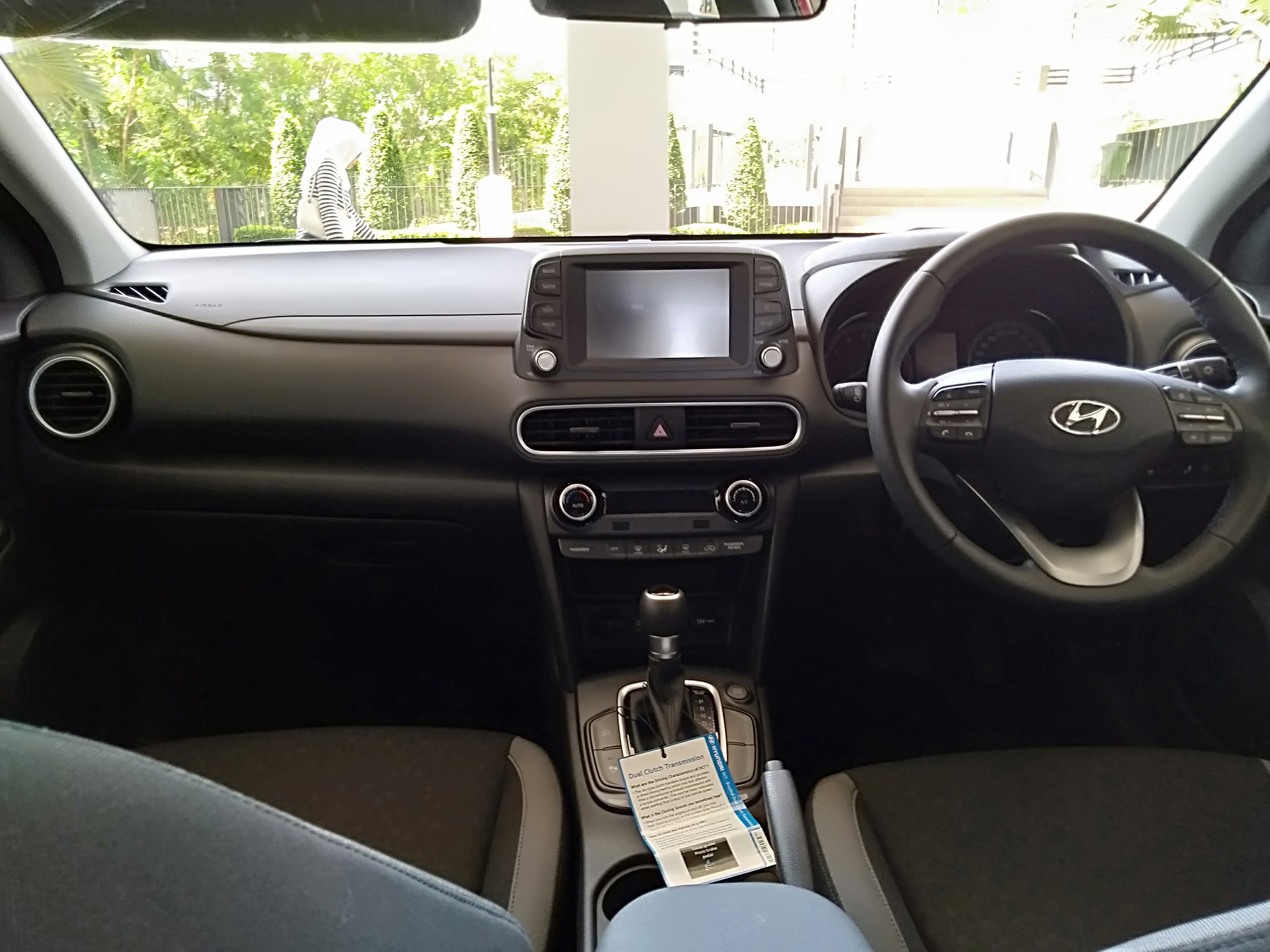
Interior

=== Kona Electric ===
The Kona Electric is a battery electric version of the Kona. It is the second electric car from Hyundai after the Ioniq. Sales started in Korea and Europe in 2018, with a market debut in the United States in 2019.

Kona Electric was available in two battery capacities: 39.2 kWh and 64 kWh. The 'ultimate' trim features adaptive cruise control and along with lane centering means the vehicle meets the SAE standard for Level 2 driverless. The Kona EV has a range of 415 km (258 mi) with the 64 kWh battery. Real-world range tests conducted by What Car in early 2019 found that the Kona EV had the highest real-world range among electric cars for sale in the United Kingdom. In 2020 Hyundai Europe conducted a three-day test at Lausitzring track in Germany and achieved ranges of up to 1026 km with the 64 kWh model, an efficiency of 100 Wh/mile (6.23Kwh/100 km) at an average speed of 30 km/h (19 mph)

In March 2019, Hyundai launched the Kona Electric in Thailand. In July 2019, Hyundai launched an Electric Lite version as Kona Electric in India. In 2020, Hyundai started producing the Kona Electric in its European factory in the Czech Republic, where there are plans for an annual production of 30,000 vehicles. Kona Electric reached 100,000 global sales in June 2020.

Hyundai Encino EV was launched on the Chinese car market in November 2019. The electric motor of the Encino EV has an output of 150 kW; 204 PS (201 hp) and 310 N⋅m (31.6 kg⋅m; 229 lb⋅ft). The motor is powered by a 64.2 kWh battery with an NEDC range of 500 km (310 mi).

In November 2021, the facelifted Hyundai Kona Electric was launched in Malaysia. With three variants, two battery packs are on offer - 39.2 kWh and 64 kWh - with battery ranges going from 303 km in the smaller pack and going up to 484 km in the larger pack.

In 2021, the Hyundai Kona Electric was the sixth best-selling electric vehicle in the UK having achieved a total of 7,199 registrations throughout the year.

In June 2024, the Hyundai Kona Electric was discontinued in India, and it is replaced by the Creta Electric.

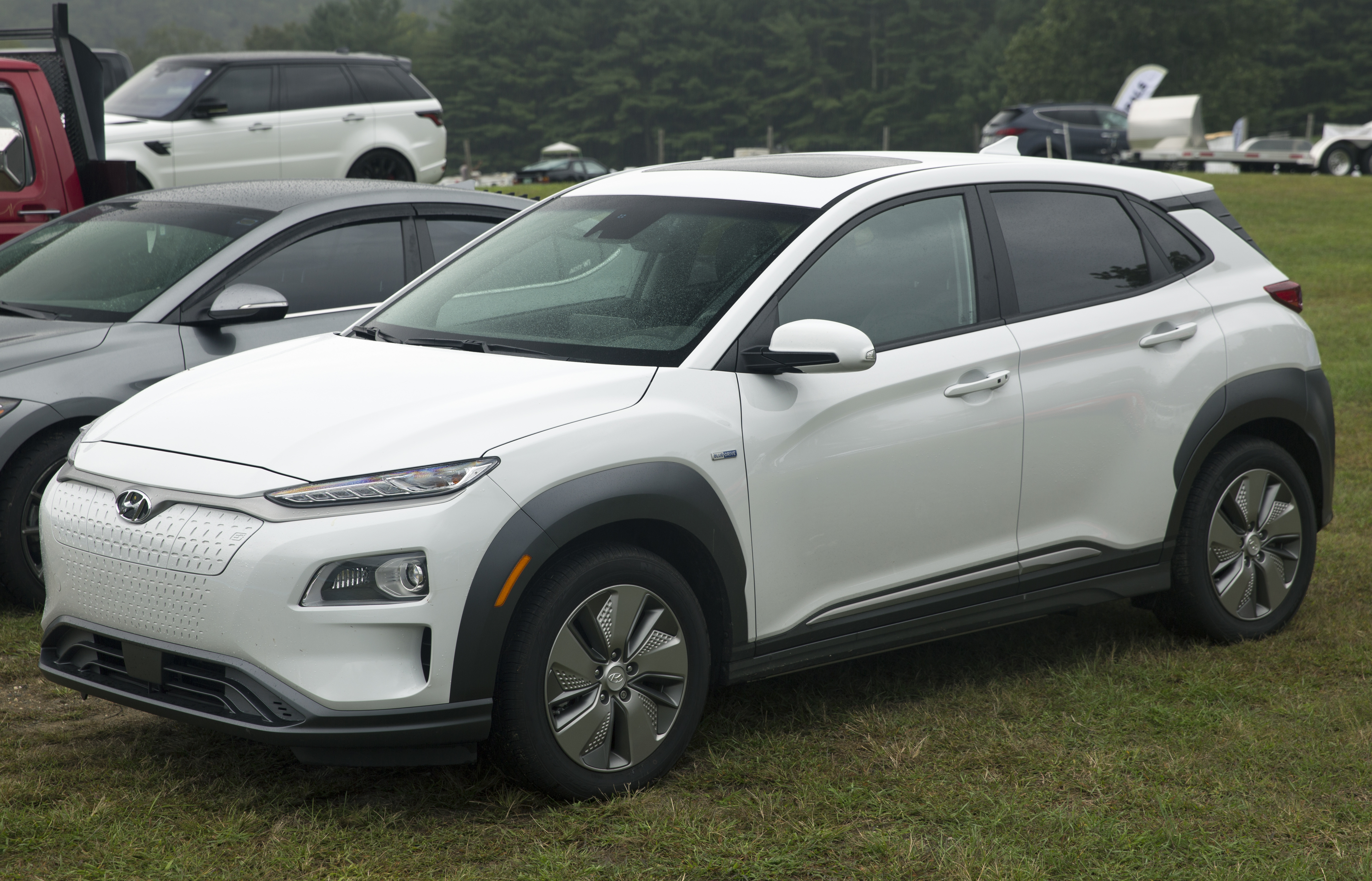
2019 Hyundai Kona Electric

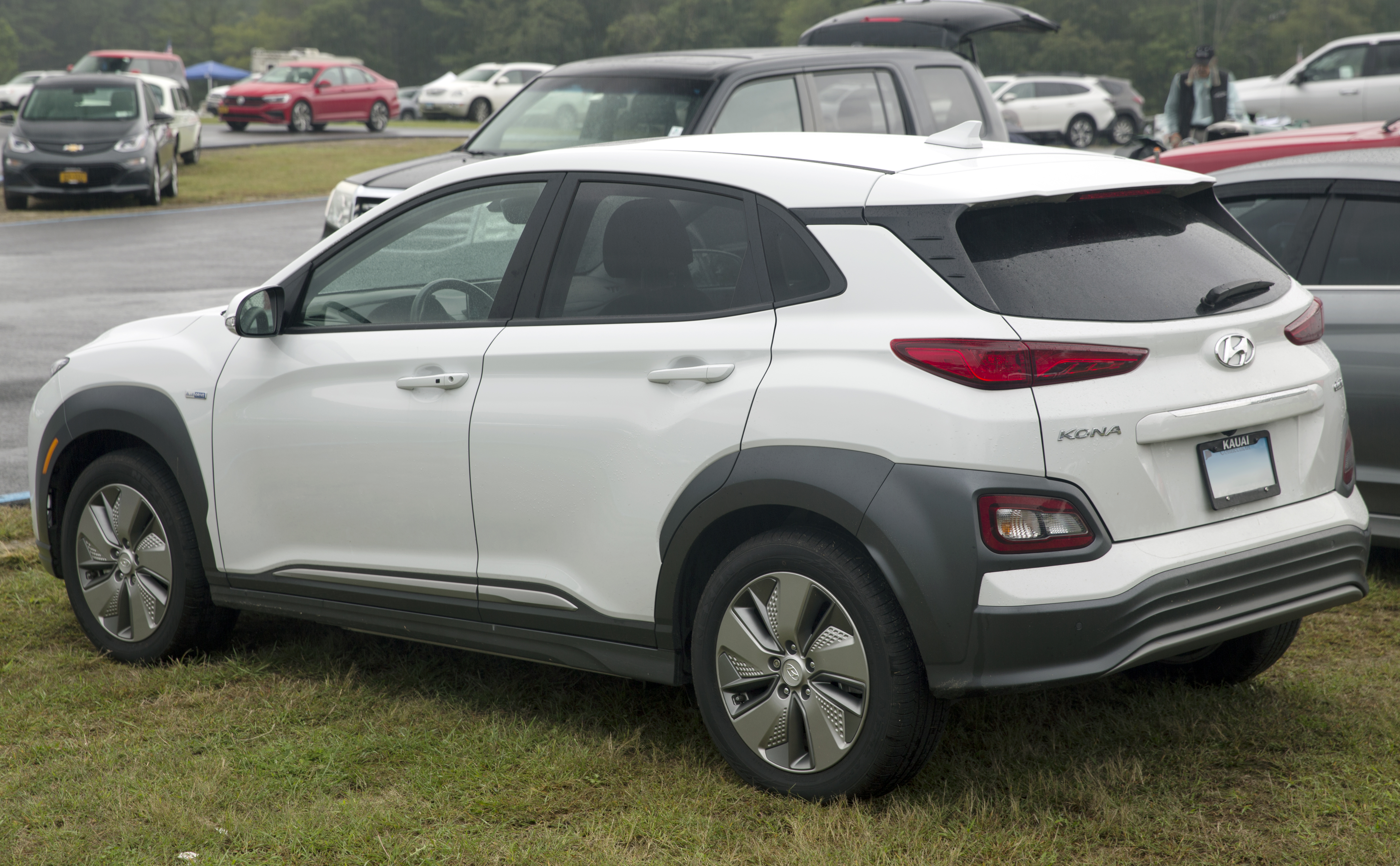
2019 Hyundai Kona Electric

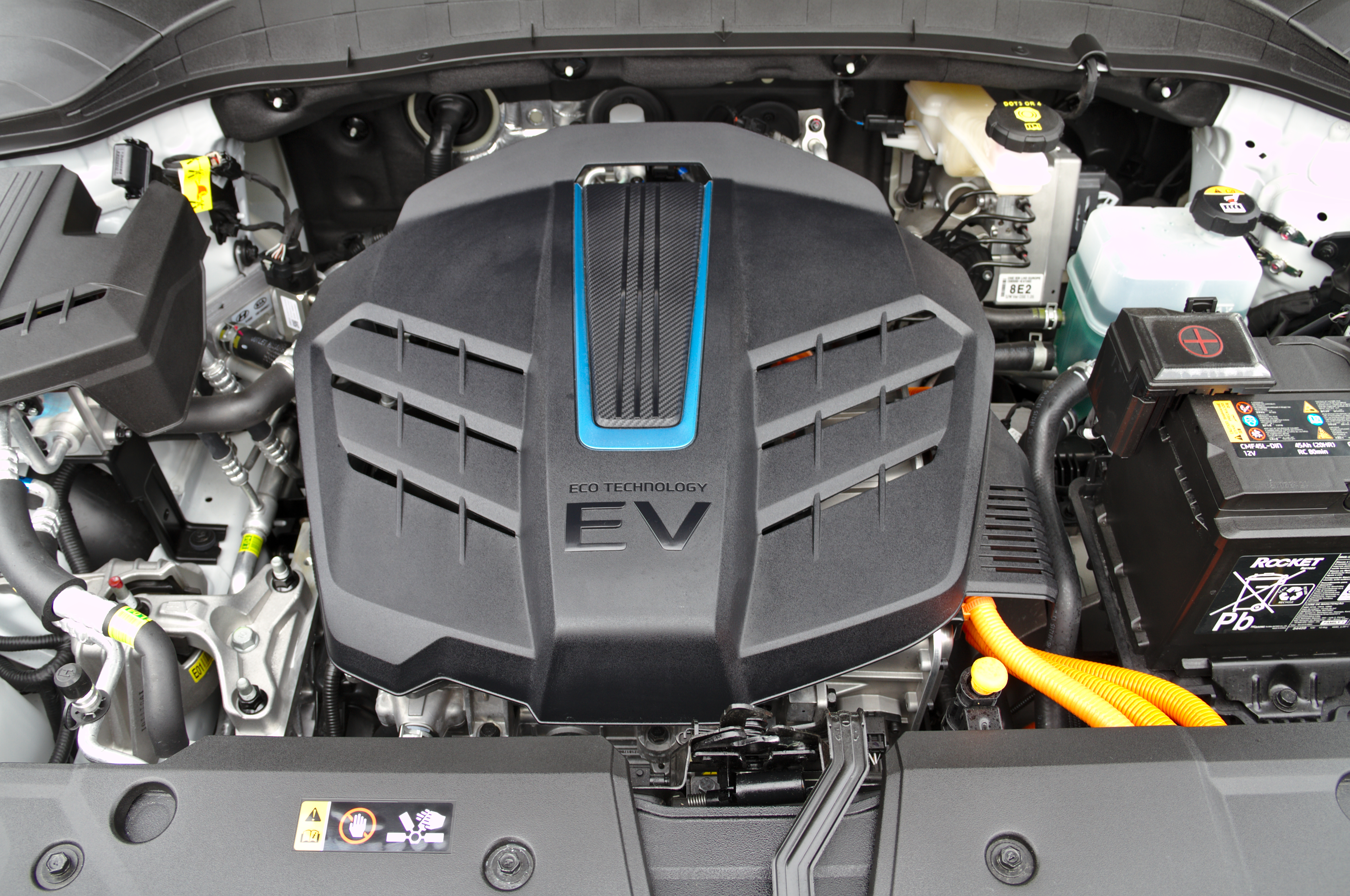
Powertrain

=== Facelift ===
In September 2020, Hyundai unveiled a facelift version of the Kona, for the original SUV as well as the Kona Electric and N Line models. The facelift primarily had exterior aesthetic changes, alongside extra cargo capacity and rear seat legroom. Also a 48 volt mild hybrid system was added to the 1.0L three cylinder

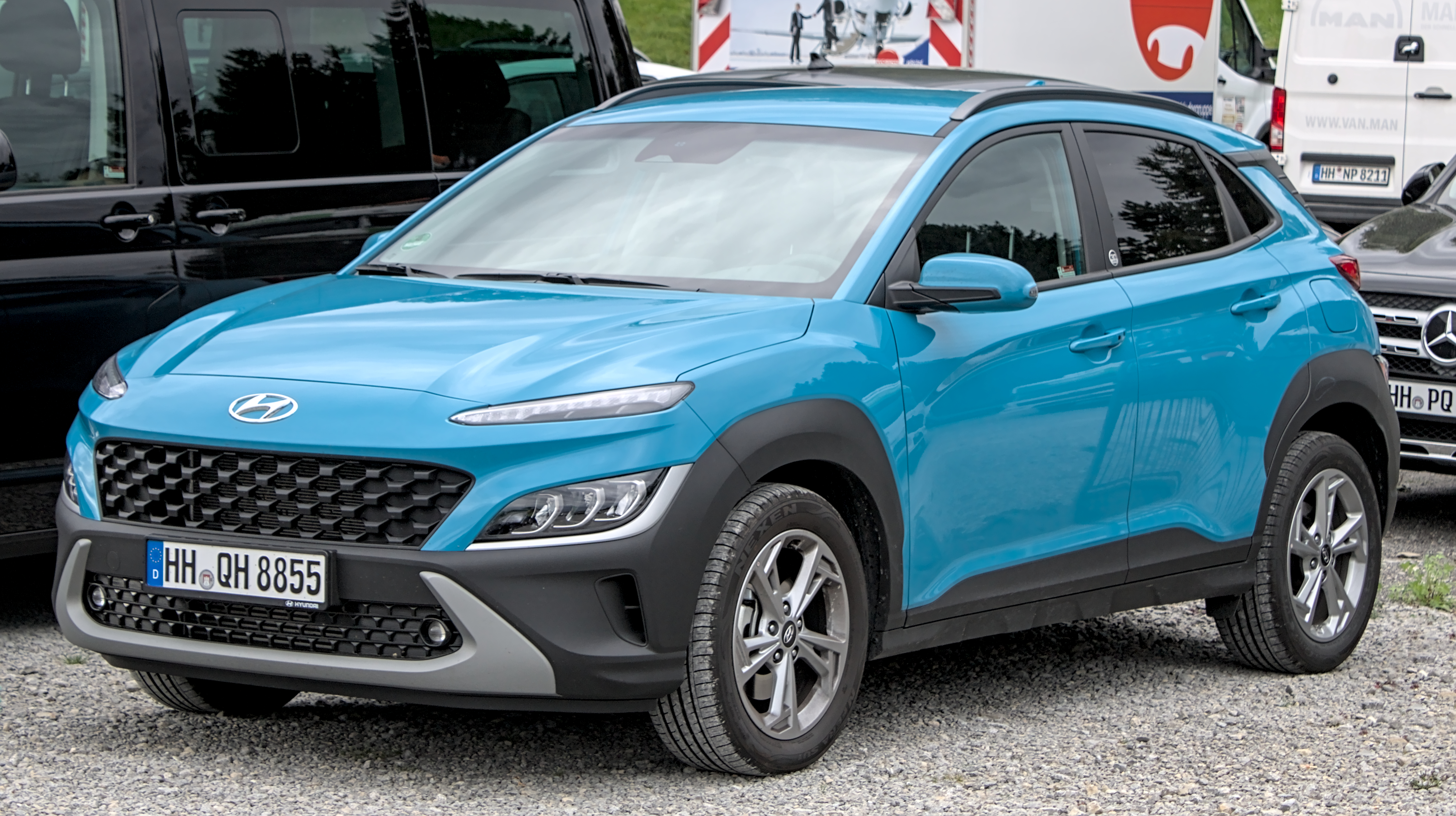
2021 Kona (facelift)

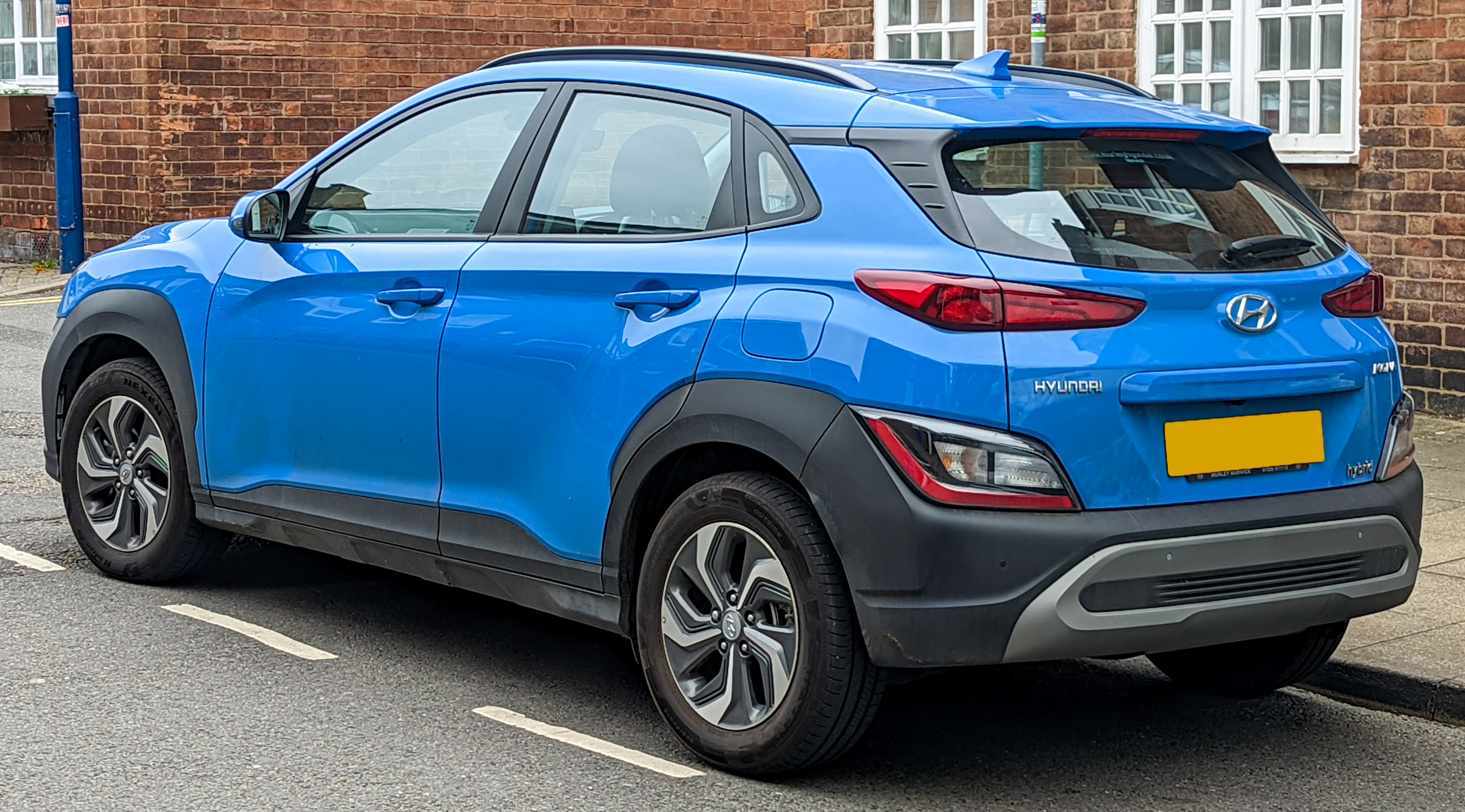
2021 Kona Hybrid (facelift)

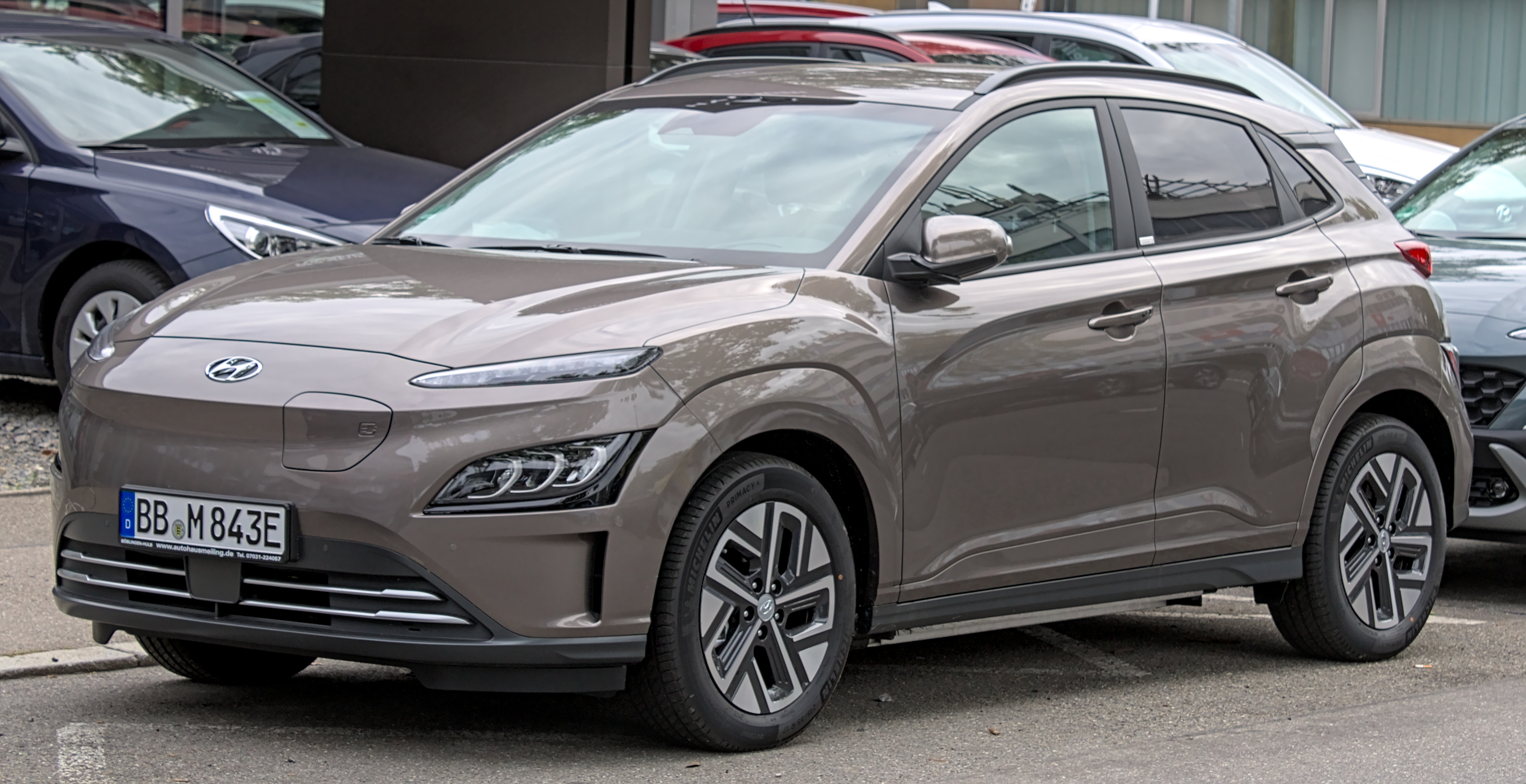
2021 Kona Electric (facelift)

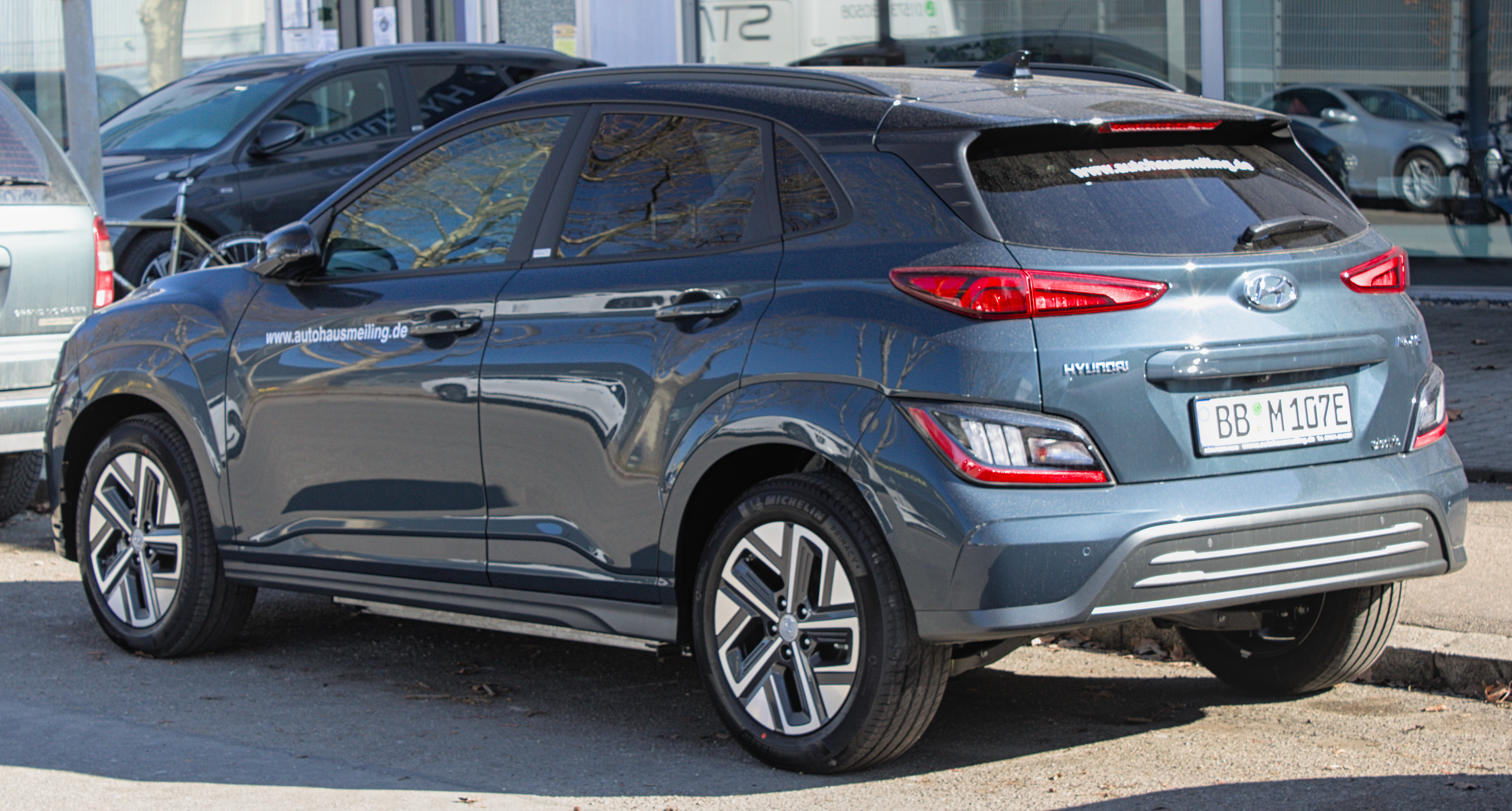
2021 Kona Electric (facelift)

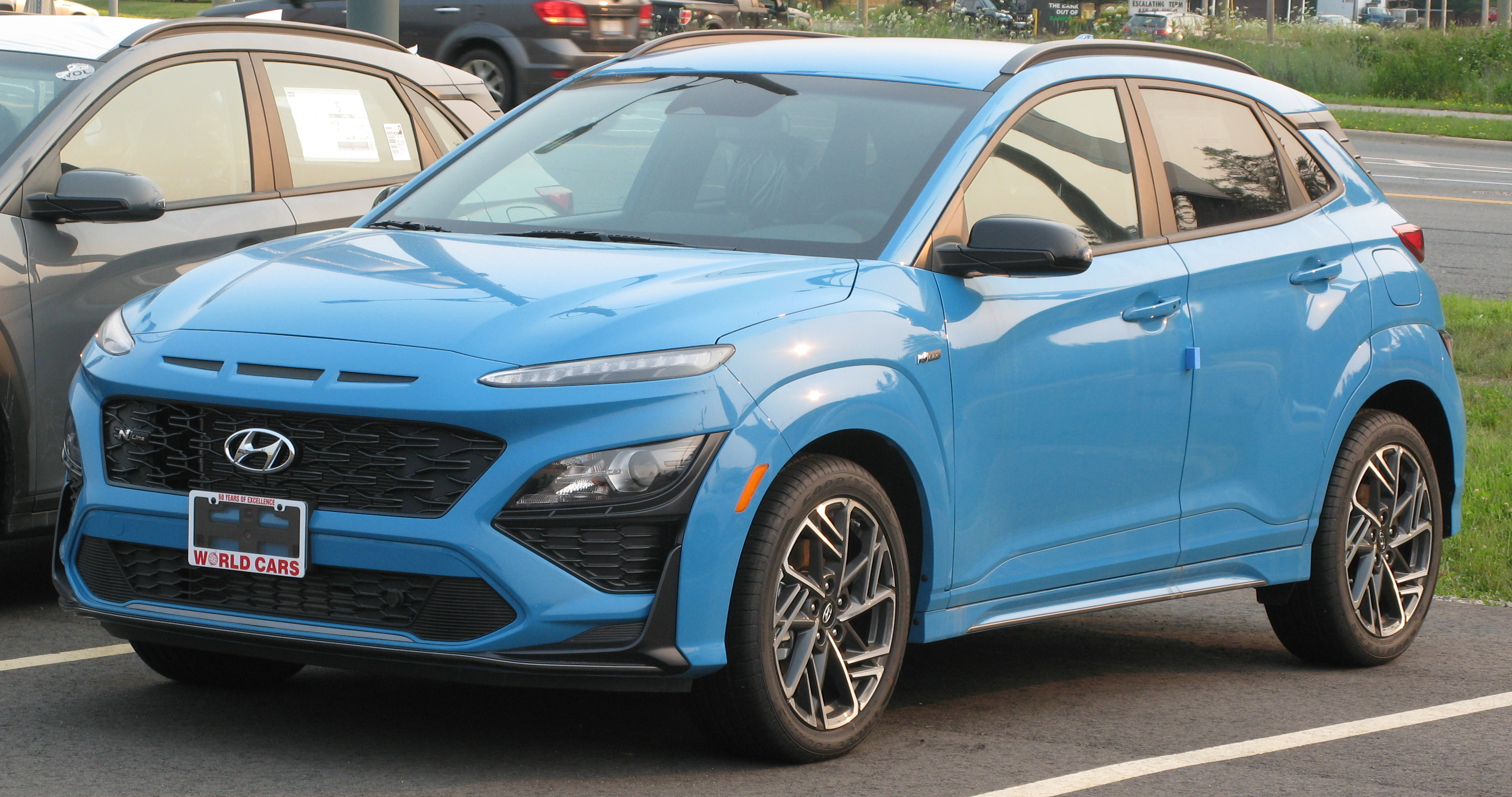
2021 Kona N Line (facelift)

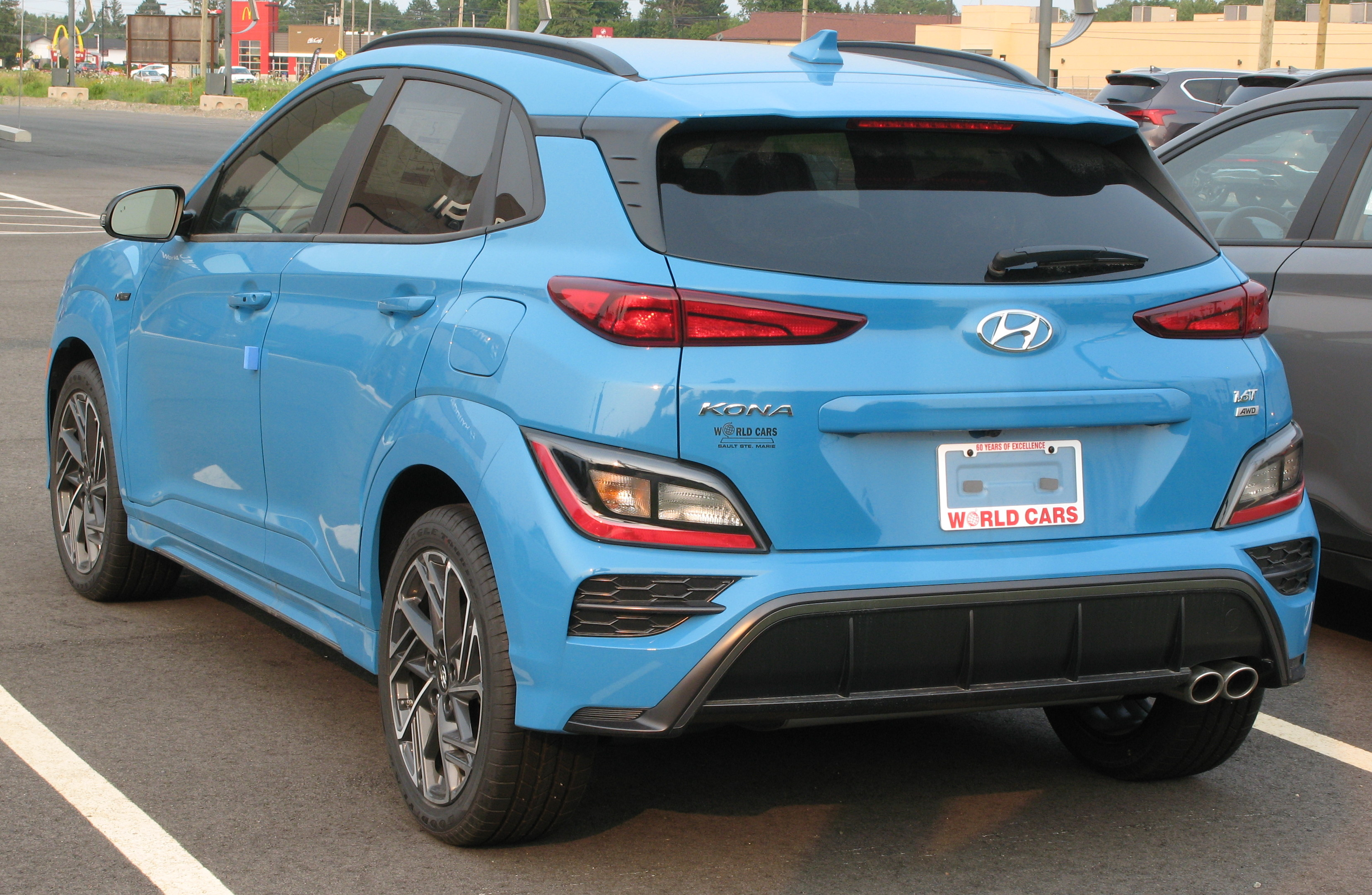
2021 Kona N Line (facelift)

=== Kona N ===
Released at Hyundai N Day on 27 April 2021, the Kona N is Hyundai's first high-performance SUV under the Hyundai N division. A 2.0-litre turbocharged GDI engine features flat power that maintains maximum output from about 5,500 rpm. The engine is capable of an output up to 280 PS (276 hp; 206 kW) and maximum torque is about 289 lb⋅ft (392 N⋅m; 40.0 kg⋅m). The output can temporarily reach up to 290 PS (286 hp; 213 kW) when in the N Grin Shift mode.

In the front, an N logo and a dark chrome-colour Hyundai logo are attached to the grille. At the sides and rear, a front lip spoiler, double-wing rear spoiler and side sill mouldings offer added downforce, improving grip force and high-speed stability. It also features an N-exclusive triangular third brake light. Inside, the seats, steering wheel, gear knob and hand brake are tinted with Performance Blue while faux suede seats come with side bolsters. An N-dedicated colour Sonic Blue was added and N Grin Shift, N Power Shift, N Track Sense Shift and Variable Exhaust Valve System come as standard.

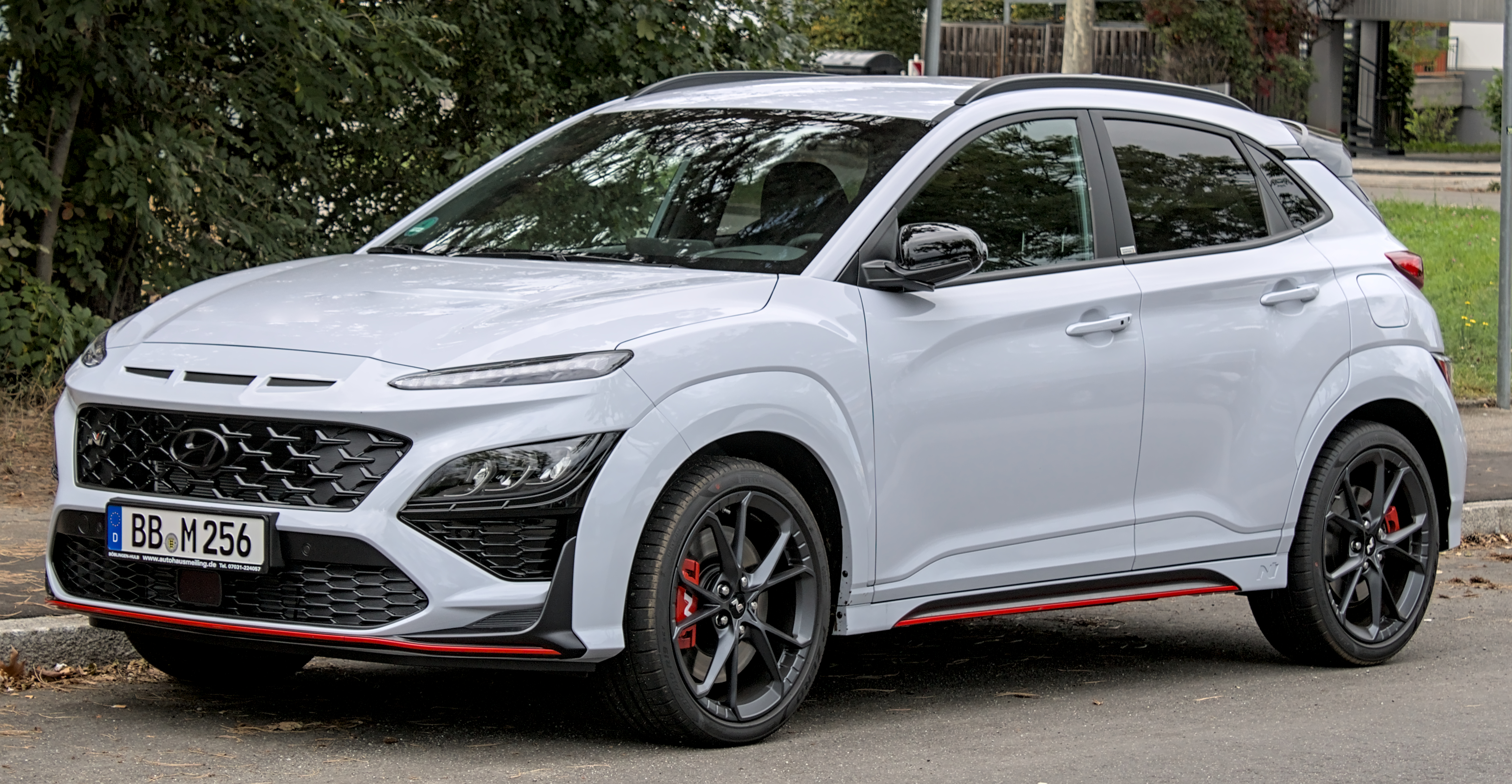
2021 Kona N

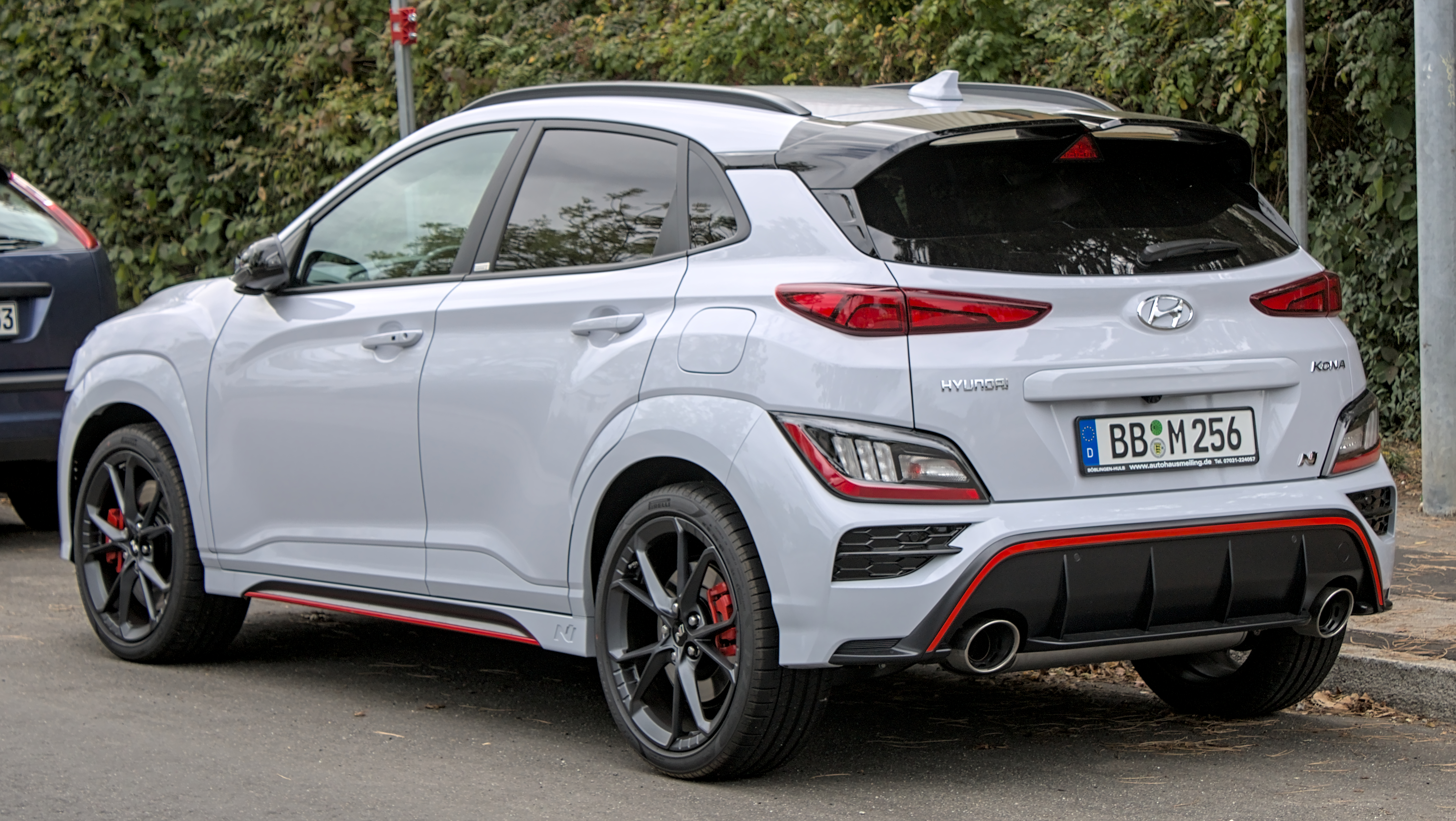
2021 Kona N

=== Hyundai Encino (China) ===
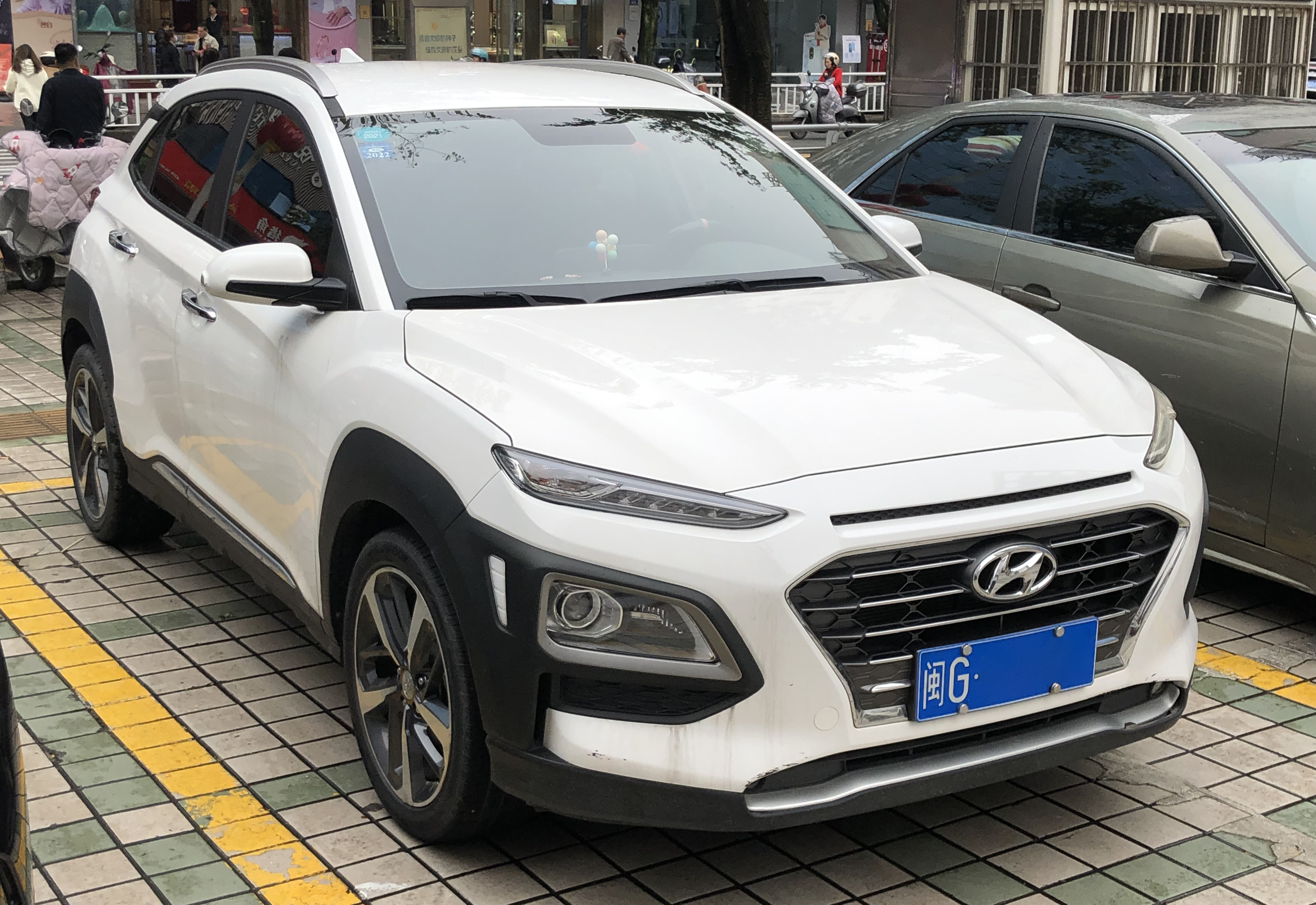
Hyundai Encino

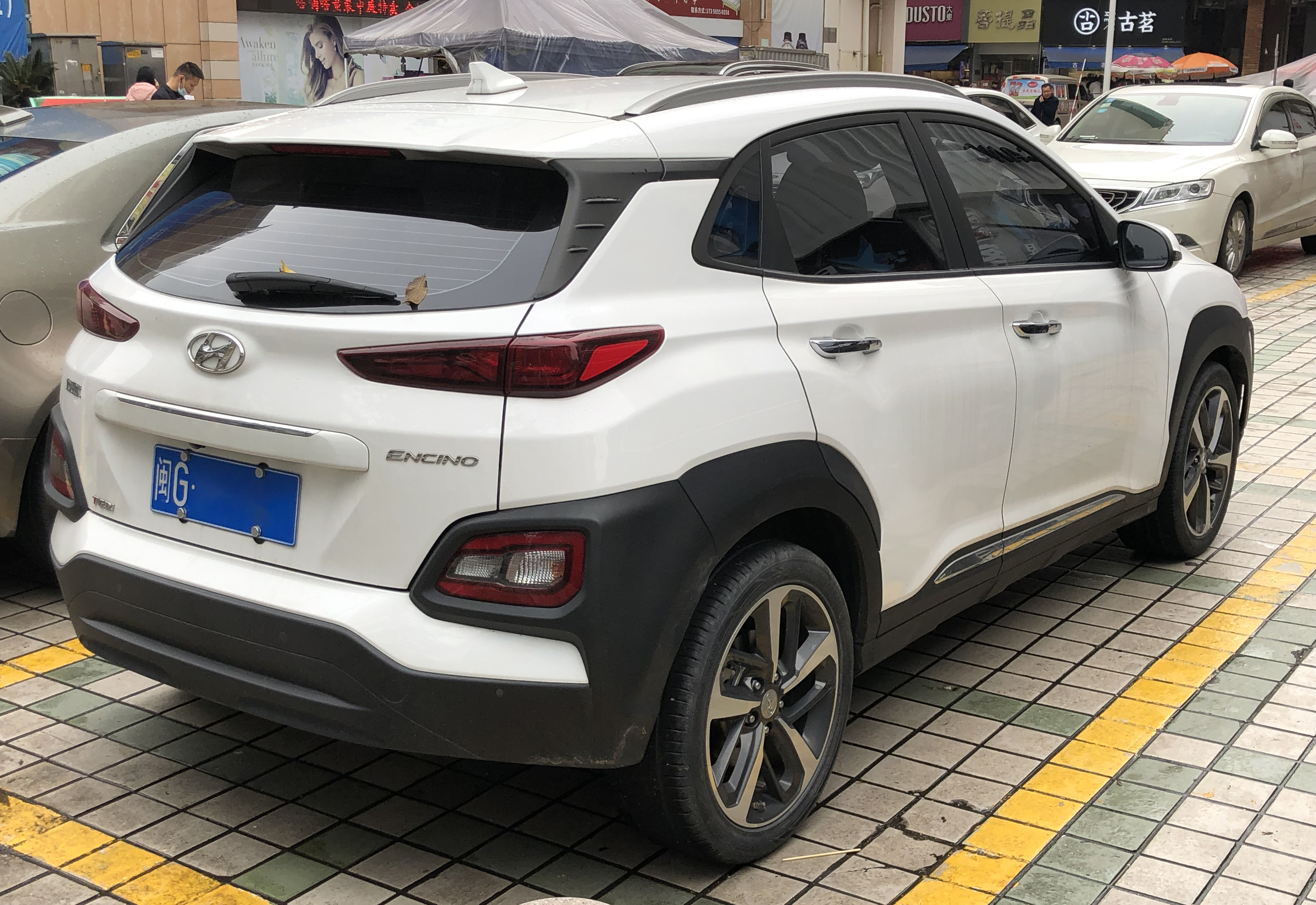
Hyundai Encino

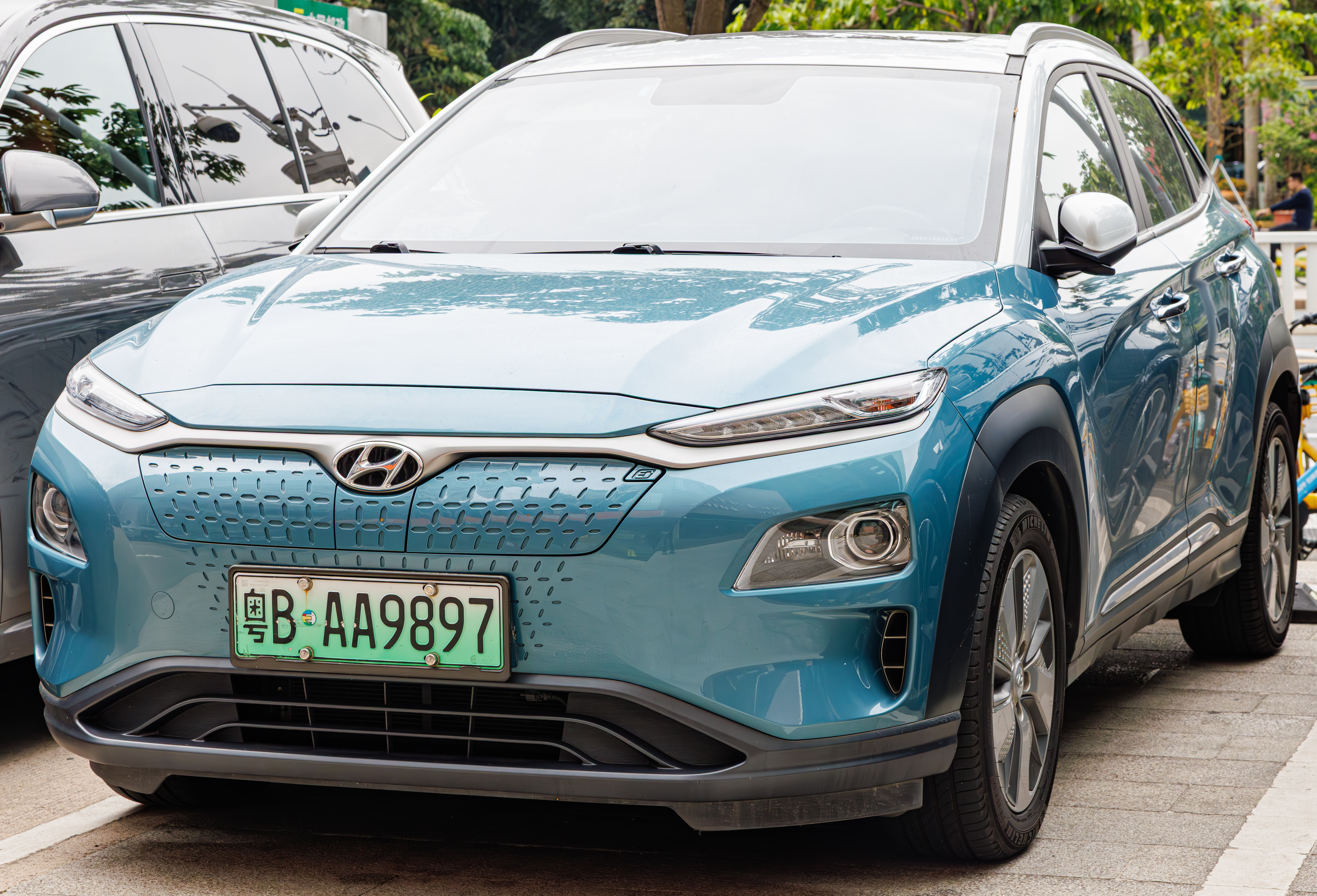
Hyundai Encino EV

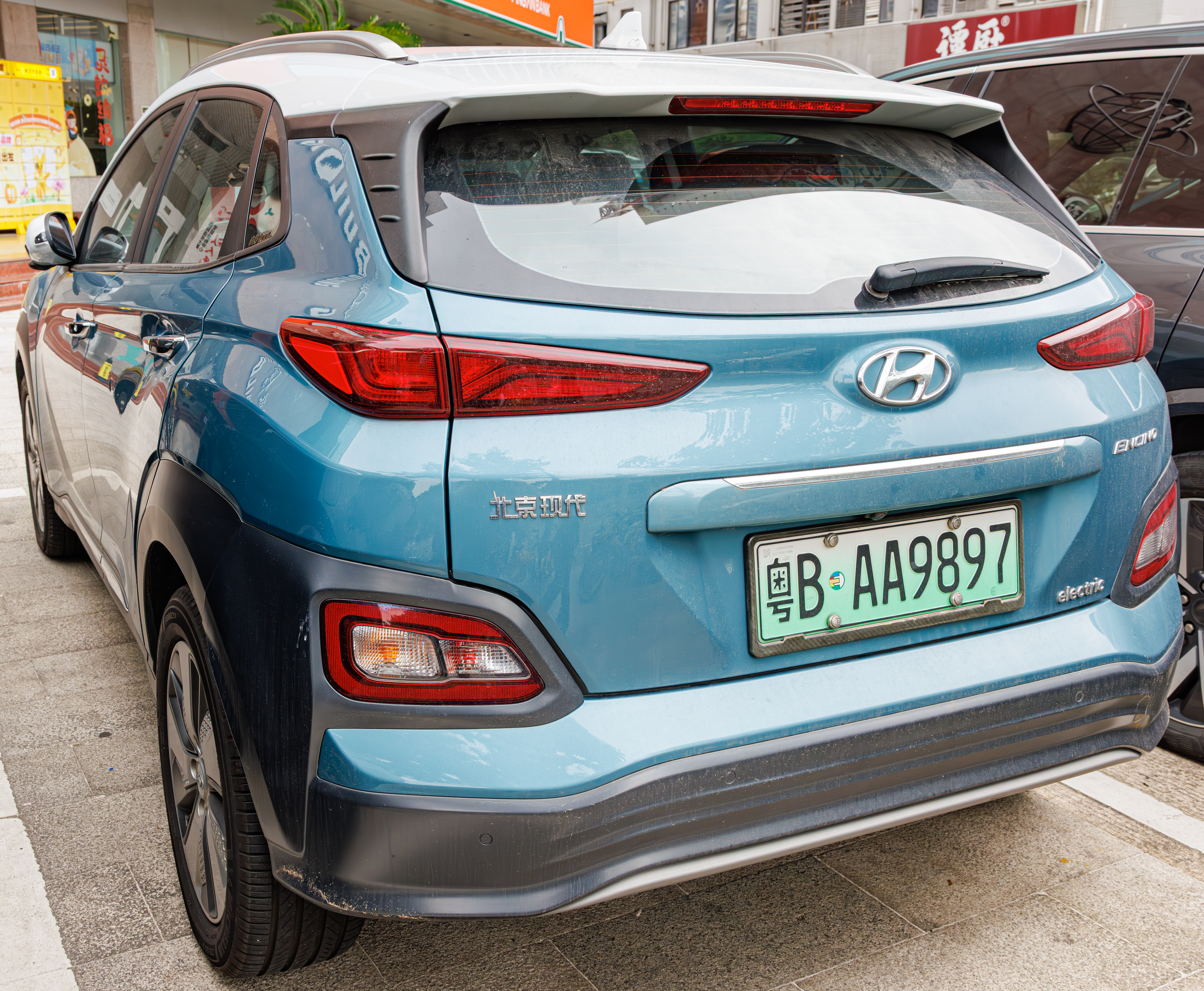
Hyundai Encino EV

=== Powertrain ===
From launch, the first-generation Kona became available with a 1.0-litre, turbocharged direct injection petrol engine producing 118 hp (120 PS; 88 kW), or a 1.6-litre turbocharged direct injection petrol engine producing 175 hp (177 PS; 130 kW), with all-wheel-drive option available on selected models.

Specs
Model	Year	Transmission	Power	Torque	0–100 km/h (0-62 mph) (Official)	Top speed
Petrol
1.0 L Kappa T-GDi	2017–2020	6-speed manual	120 PS (88 kW; 118 hp) @ 6,000 rpm	17.5 kg⋅m (172 N⋅m; 127 lbf⋅ft) @ 1,500–4,000 rpm	12.0s	181 km/h (112 mph)
1.0 L Smartstream G1.0 T-GDi	2020–2023	6-speed manual	120 PS (88 kW; 118 hp) @ 6,000 rpm	17.5 kg⋅m (172 N⋅m; 127 lbf⋅ft) @ 1,500–4,000 rpm	11.5s 11.9s (Mild hybrid)	181 km/h (112 mph); 180 km/h (110 mph) (Mild hybrid)
1.0 L Smartstream G1.0 T-GDi	2020–2023	7-speed DCT	120 PS (88 kW; 118 hp) @ 6,000 rpm	20.4 kg⋅m (200 N⋅m; 148 lbf⋅ft) @ 2,000–3,500 rpm	11.0s	182 km/h (113 mph)
1.6 L Gamma T-GDi	2017–2020	7-speed DCT	177 PS (130 kW; 175 hp) @ 5,500 rpm	27 kg⋅m (265 N⋅m; 195 lbf⋅ft) @ 1,500–4,500 rpm	7.7s (FWD); 7.9s (AWD)	209 km/h (130 mph) (FWD); 205 km/h (127 mph) (AWD)
1.6 L Smartstream G1.6 T-GDi	2020–2023	7-speed DCT	198 PS (146 kW; 195 hp) @ 6,000 rpm	27 kg⋅m (265 N⋅m; 195 lbf⋅ft) @ 1,800–4,500 rpm	7.7s (FWD); 8.1s (AWD)	210 km/h (130 mph)
2.0 L Nu MPi	2017–2020	6-speed automatic	149 PS (110 kW; 147 hp) @ 6,200 rpm	18.4 kg⋅m (180 N⋅m; 133 lbf⋅ft) @ 4,500 rpm	9.2s (FWD)	200 km/h (120 mph) (FWD)
2.0 L Smartstream G2.0 MPi	2020–2023	6-speed automatic CVT	149 PS (110 kW; 147 hp) @ 6,200 rpm	18.3 kg⋅m (179 N⋅m; 132 lbf⋅ft) @ 4,500 rpm		
2.0 L Theta II T-GDi	2021–2023	8-speed DCT	280 PS (206 kW; 276 hp) @ 5,500–6,000 rpm	40 kg⋅m (392 N⋅m; 289 lbf⋅ft) @ 2,100–4,700 rpm	5.5s	240 km/h (149 mph)
Hybrid
1.6 L Kappa GDi Hybrid	2019–2020	6-speed DCT	141 PS (104 kW; 139 hp) @ 5,700 rpm	27 kg⋅m (265 N⋅m; 195 lbf⋅ft) @ 4,000 rpm	11.2s (SE); 11.6s (Premium)	185 km/h (115 mph)
1.6 L Smartstream G1.6 GDi Hybrid	2020–2023	6-speed DCT	141 PS (104 kW; 139 hp) @ 5,700 rpm	27 kg⋅m (265 N⋅m; 195 lbf⋅ft) @ 4,000 rpm	11.0s (SE); 11.3s (Premium)	161 km/h (100 mph)
Diesel
1.6 L U II CRDi	2017–2020	6-speed manual 7-speed DCT	115 PS (85 kW; 113 hp) @ 4,000 rpm 136 PS (100 kW; 134 hp) @ 4,000 rpm	28.6 kg⋅m (280 N⋅m; 207 lbf⋅ft) @ 1,500–2,750 rpm 32.6 kg⋅m (320 N⋅m; 236 lbf⋅ft) @ 2,000–2,250 rpm	10.7s (115 PS); 10.2s (136 PS)	183 km/h (114 mph) (115 PS); 192 km/h (119 mph) (136 PS)
1.6 L Smartstream D1.6 CRDi	2020–2023	6-speed manual 7-speed DCT	136 PS (100 kW; 134 hp) @ 4,000 rpm	28.6 kg⋅m (280 N⋅m; 207 lbf⋅ft) @ 1,500–3,000 rpm 32.6 kg⋅m (320 N⋅m; 236 lbf⋅ft) @ 2,000–2,250 rpm	10.3s (manual); 9.9s (FWD DCT); 10.5s (AWD DCT)	190 km/h (120 mph) (manual/FWD DCT); 185 km/h (115 mph) (AWD DCT)
Electric
Electric Lite / Electric SE	2018–2023	1-speed reduction gear	136 PS (100 kW; 134 hp) @ 2,600–8,000 rpm	40.15 kg⋅m (394 N⋅m; 290 lbf⋅ft) @ 0–2,400 rpm	9.7s–9.9s	155 km/h (96 mph)
Electric / Electric SEL	2018–2023	1-speed reduction gear	204 PS (150 kW; 201 hp) @ 3,800–8,000 rpm	40.15 kg⋅m (394 N⋅m; 290 lbf⋅ft) @ 0–3,600 rpm	7.6s–7.9s	167 km/h (104 mph)

=== Special editions ===
Kona Iron Man Special Edition

In 2019, Hyundai released a special Iron Man edition Kona (co-branded with Marvel) to promote Avengers: Endgame. The limited edition Kona was finished in matte gray with red accents and features blue daytime running lights, Stark Industries graphics, an Iron Man-themed instrument cluster, arc reactor imagery, and Tony Stark's signature on the dashboard. In the UK, 300 of the version were planned to be available.

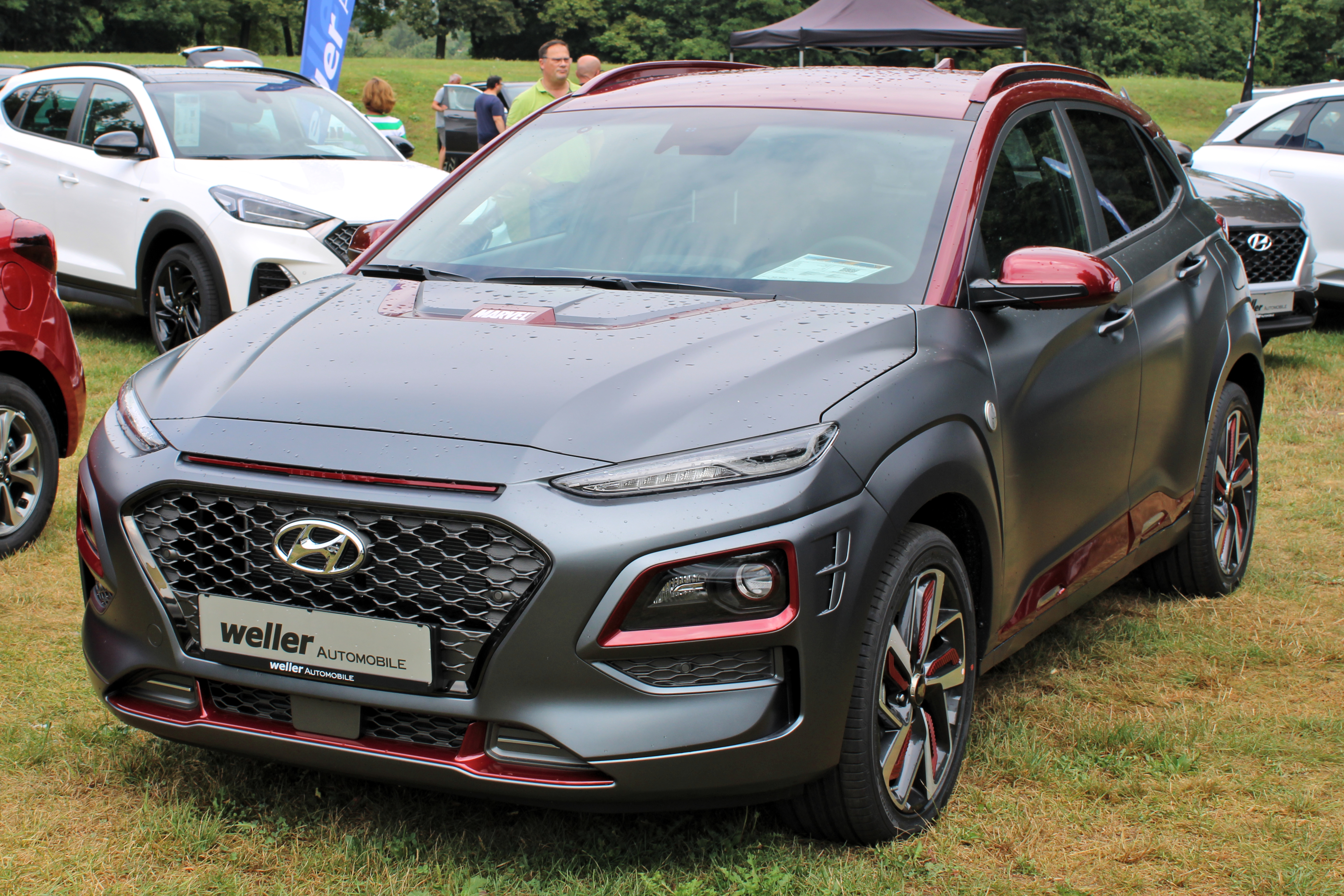
Hyundai Kona Iron Man Edition front view

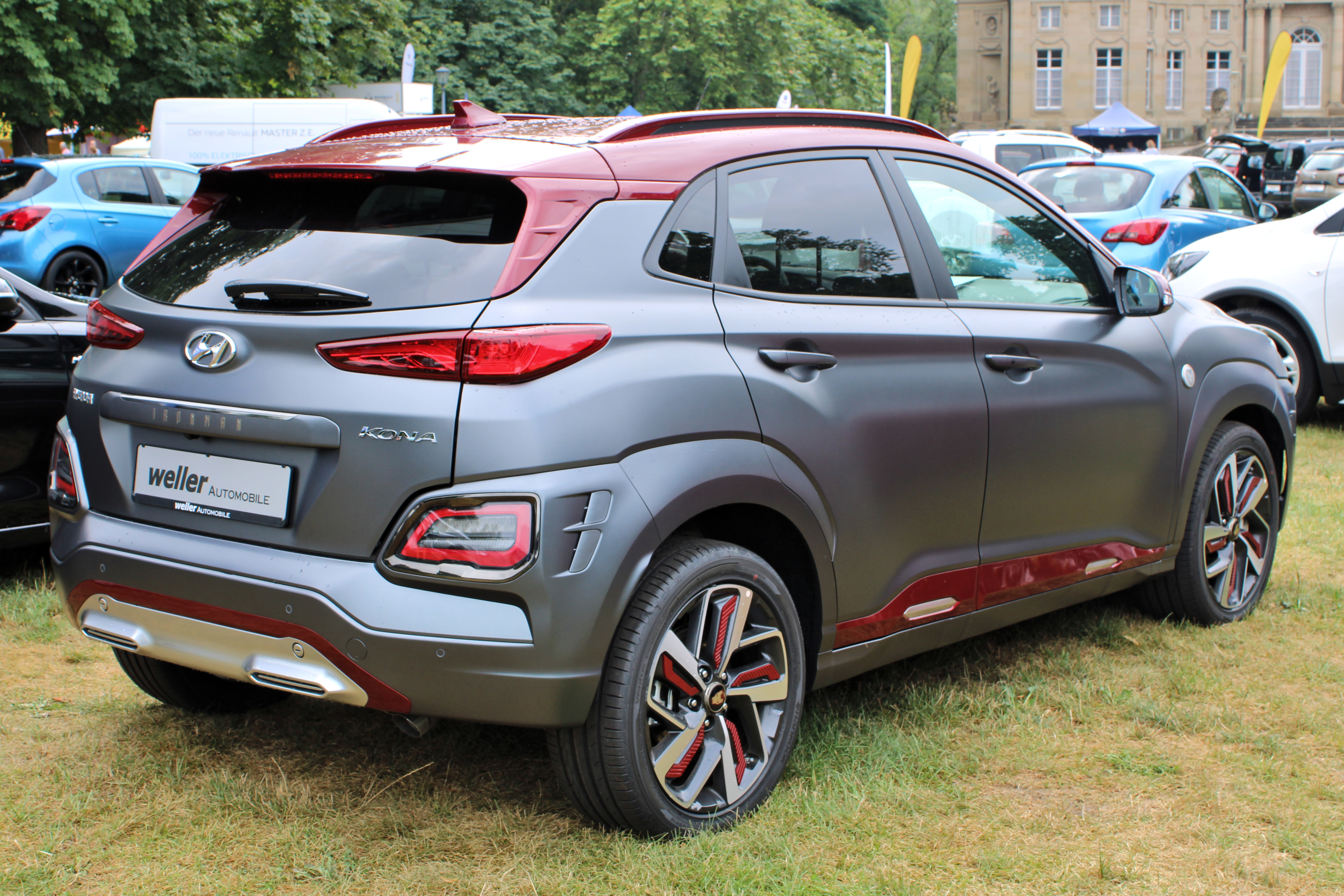
Hyundai Kona Iron Man Edition rear view

=== Safety ===
The first-generation Kona body is made from 51% advanced high strength steel with 'hot stamping' and adhesives for added rigidity. Standard safety equipment in some countries includes six airbags, lane keeping assist and a driver attention monitor. Other features include automatic emergency braking with pedestrian detection, blind spot detection and a rear cross traffic alert.

Euro NCAP test results* Hyundai Kona 1.0 T-GDi (LHD) (2017)
Test	Points	%
Overall:	5 /5 stars	
Adult occupant:	33.4	87%
Child occupant:	41.8	85%
Pedestrian:	26.4	62%
Safety assist:	7.2	60%

The 2018 Kona was awarded "Top Safety Pick+" by the American IIHS.

IIHS scores (2018)
Small overlap front (driver)	Good		
Small overlap front (passenger)	Good		
Moderate overlap front (original test)	Good		
Side (original test)	Good		
Roof strength	Good		
Head restraints and seats	Good		
Headlights (varies by trim/option)	Good	Poor	
Front crash prevention: vehicle-to-vehicle	Superior		Optional system
Front crash prevention: vehicle-to-pedestrian (Day)	Advanced		Optional system
Child seat anchors (LATCH) ease of use	Marginal		

ANCAP test results* Hyundai Kona (2017)
Test	Score
Overall	5 /5 stars
Frontal offset	14.07/16
Side impact	16/16
Pole	2/2
Seat belt reminders	3/3
Whiplash protection	Good
Pedestrian protection	Adequate
Electronic stability control	Standard

== Second generation (SX2; 2023) ==
Second generation
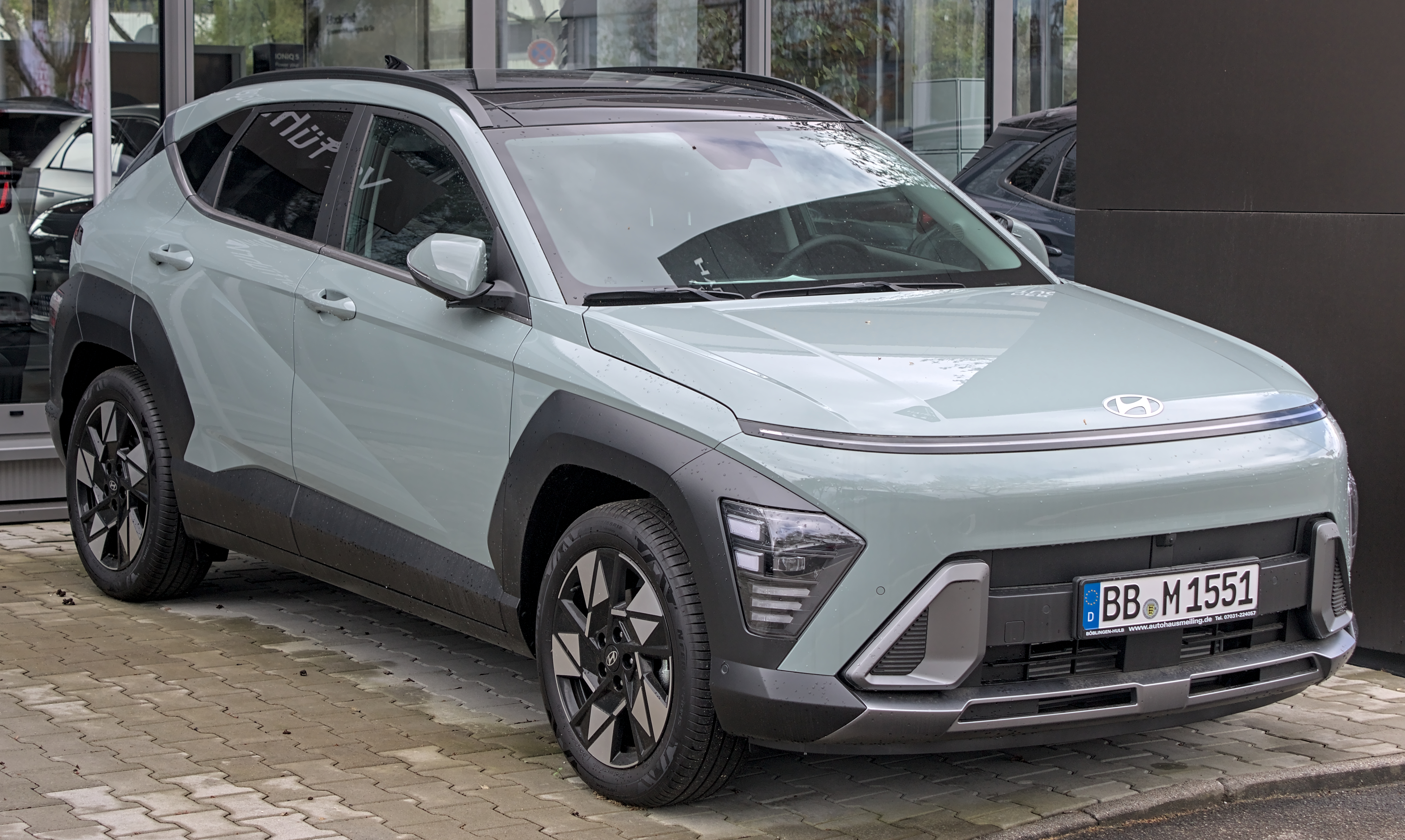
- Hyundai Kona (SX2)

Overview
- Model code: SX2
- Also called: Hyundai Kauai (Portugal)
- Production: 2023–present
- Model years: 2024–present
- Assembly: South Korea: Ulsan (Ulsan Plant 1, 3); Czech Republic: Nošovice (HMMC, electric only); Indonesia: Cikarang (HMMI, electric only)
- Designer: Sergey Konkov, Hyun-doo Lee, Fongs Choi, Kang In-soo

Body and chassis
- Platform: Hyundai-Kia K3/K4-P2
- Related: Kia Niro (SG2)

Powertrain
- Engine: Petrol: 1.0 L Smartstream G1.0 T-GDi I3 (Mild hybrid); 1.6 L Smartstream G1.6 T-GDi I4; 2.0 L Smartstream G2.0 MPi I4; Petrol hybrid: 1.6 L Smartstream G1.6 GDi HEV I4
- Electric motor: Permanent magnet synchronous motor (Hybrid)
- Power output: 99 kW (133 hp) (Electric Standard Range); 150 kW (201 hp) (Electric Long Range)
- Transmission: 6-speed manual; 8-speed automatic; 6-speed D6KF1 DCT; 7-speed D7UF1 DCT; CVT; 1-speed reduction gear
- Battery: 48.6 kWh (Electric Standard Range, depending on market); 64.8 kWh (Electric Long Range, depending on market)
- Electric range: Up to 490 km (304 mi) (WLTP)(Electric Long Range)
- Plug-in charging: 11kW (AC); 74kW (DC, 48.4kWh); 102 kW(DC, 65.4kWh)

Dimensions
- Wheelbase: 2,660 mm (104.7 in)
- Length: 4,350–4,385 mm (171.3–172.6 in)
- Width: 1,825 mm (71.9 in)
- Height: 1,575–1,590 mm (62.0–62.6 in)
- Kerb weight: 1,295–1,525 kg (2,855–3,362 lb); 1,615–1,795 kg (3,560–3,957 lb) (Electric)

The second-generation Kona was revealed in December 2022. It is available with petrol, mild hybrid, hybrid and battery electric models, while diesel engine options are no longer offered.

According to Hyundai, the second-generation Kona was first designed as a battery electric vehicle before being adapted for other variants. Compared to the previous generation, the vehicle has a significantly larger footprint with around 150 mm (5.9 in) additional length (depending on the variant) and a 60 mm (2.4 in) longer wheelbase. As the result, the rear legroom is 31 mm (1.2 in) larger at 925 mm (36.4 in). With the second-row seat folded, the vehicle has 466 litres (16.5 cu ft) of boot space (VDA standard) or 723 litres (25.5 cu ft) (SAE standard). The drag coefficient is rated 0.27.

The front clip is decorated by thin horizontal lamps, and the wheel arch cladding design of the side parts is integrated with the front and rear lamps.

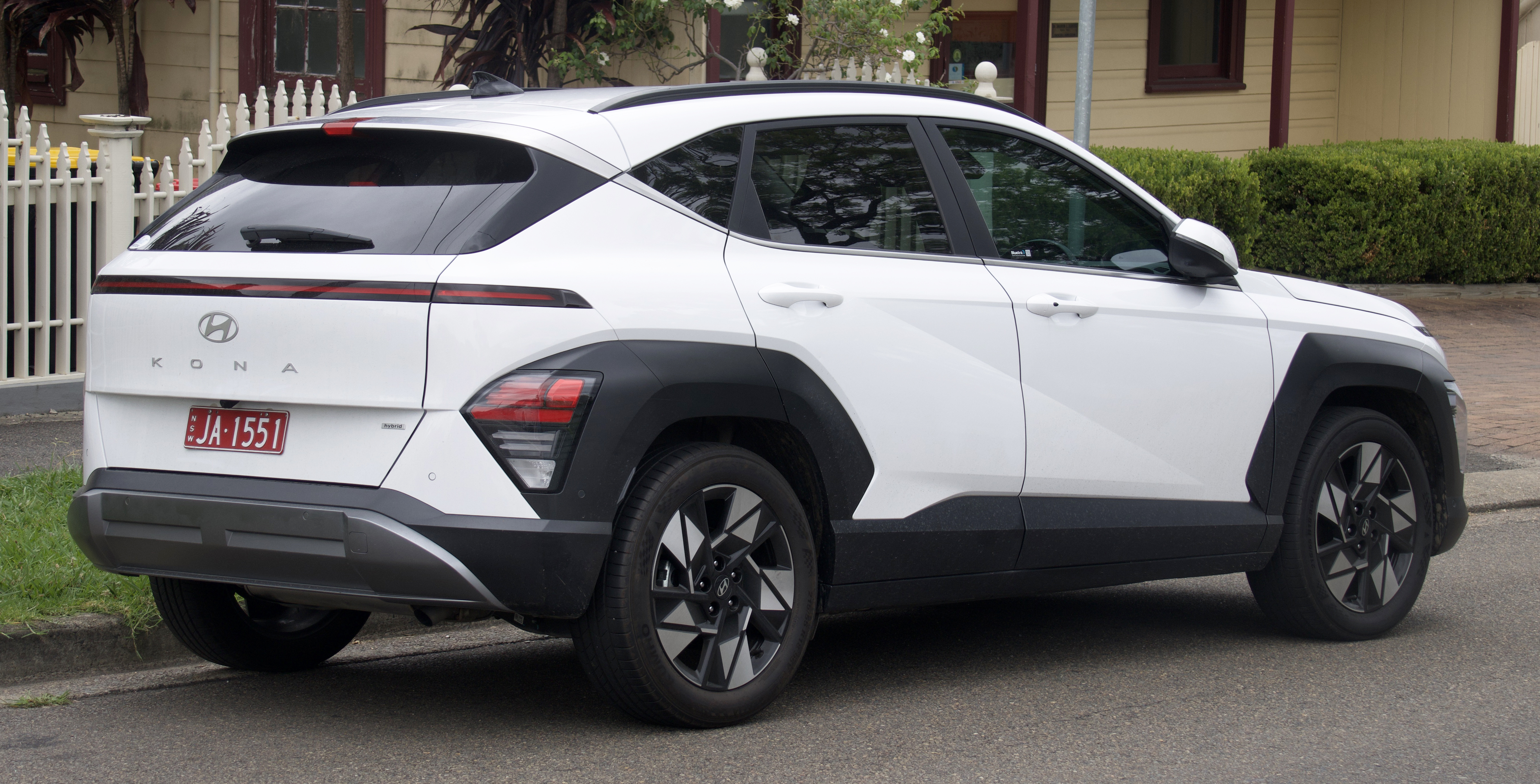
Rear view

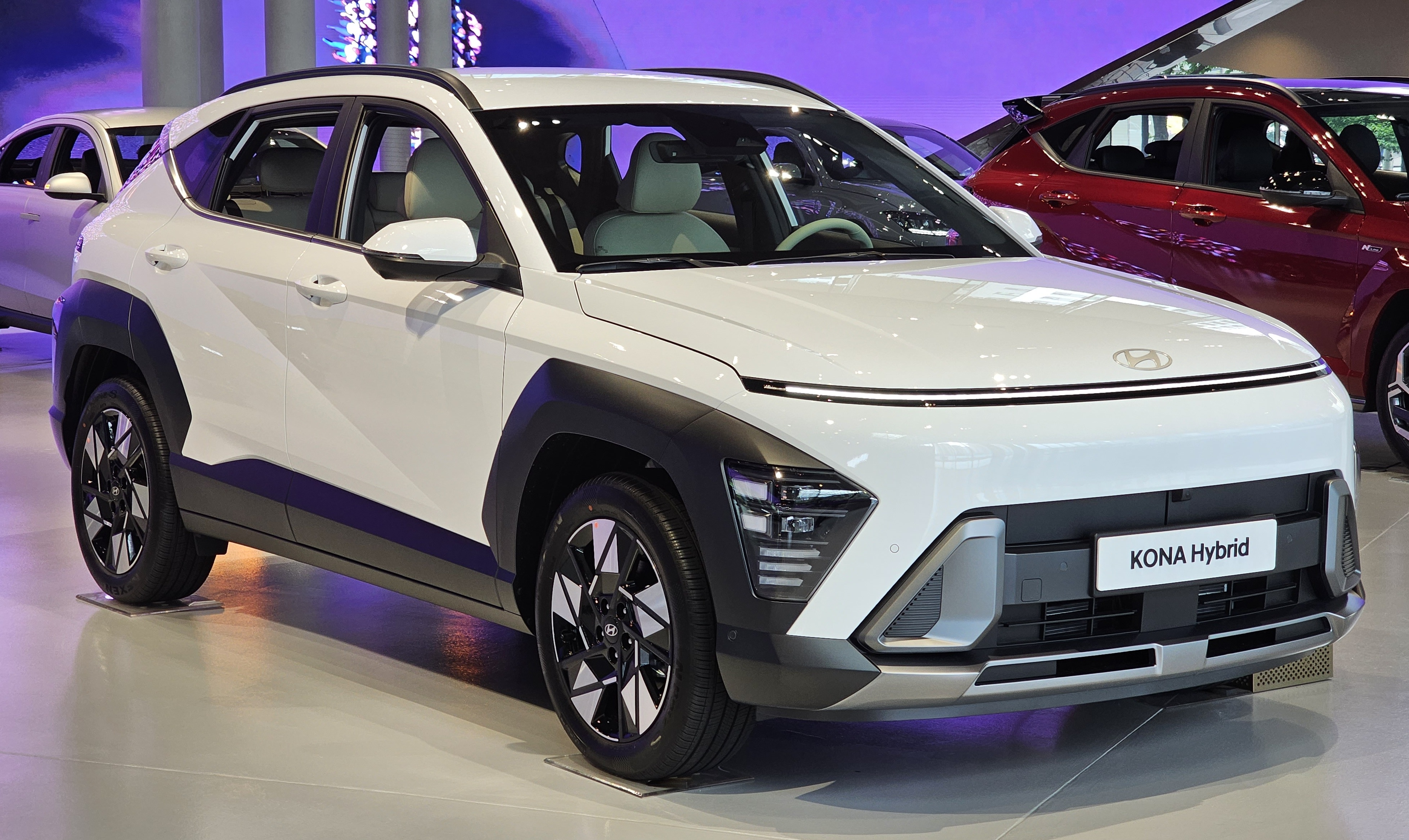
Hyundai Kona Hybrid

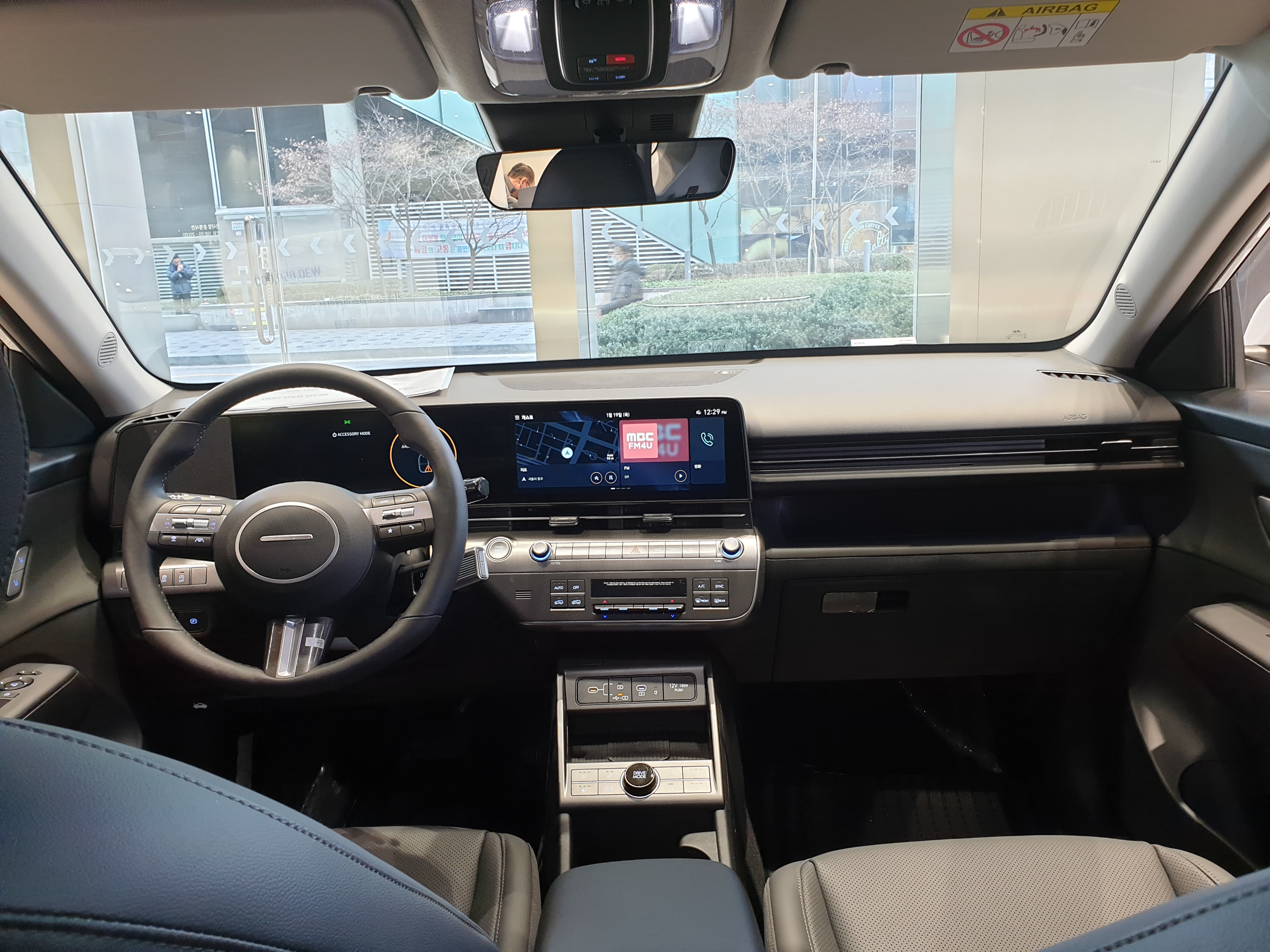
Interior

=== Kona Electric ===
The second-generation Kona Electric has been available since launch. The variant is distinguished with pixelated front and rear thin light bars and a blocked front grille, while a Parametric Pixel design feature has been applied to the front and bottom of the rear bumper.

The Kona Electric is built with a 400 V electrical architecture, which results in slower DC fast charging than Hyundai electric vehicles built on the newer 800 V architecture. Hyundai states that the Long Range model can charge from 10 to 80 percent in about 41 minutes. It also includes vehicle-to-load (V2L) support, with different maximum outputs depending on the market.

Two battery capacities are offered: 48.4 kWh for the Standard Range model and 65.4 kWh for the Long Range model, both powering a front-mounted electric motor. The Long Range model has a WLTP range of up to 490 km (304 mi).

The Kona Electric N-Line was revealed on 17 January 2024.

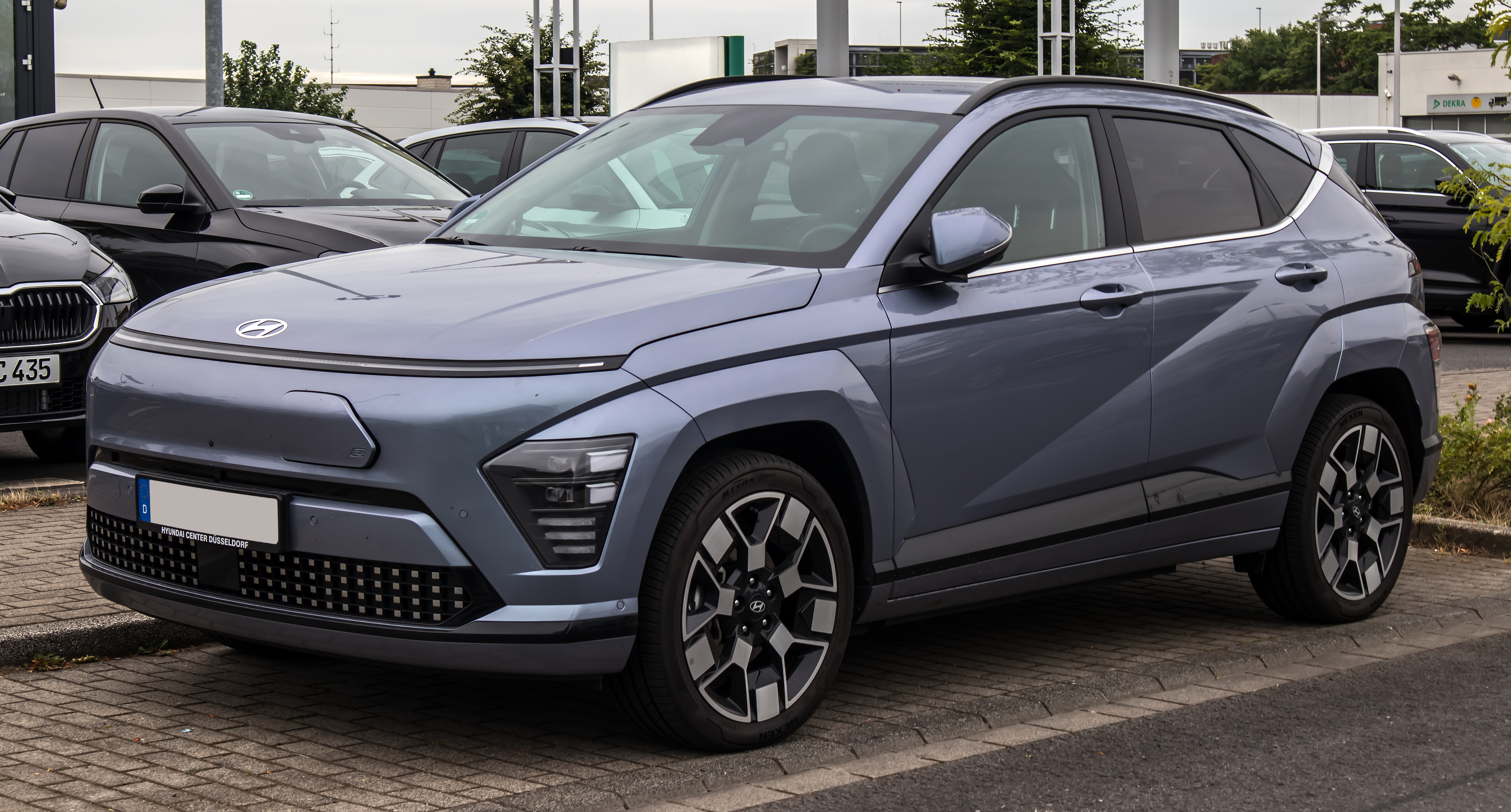
Kona Electric (front)

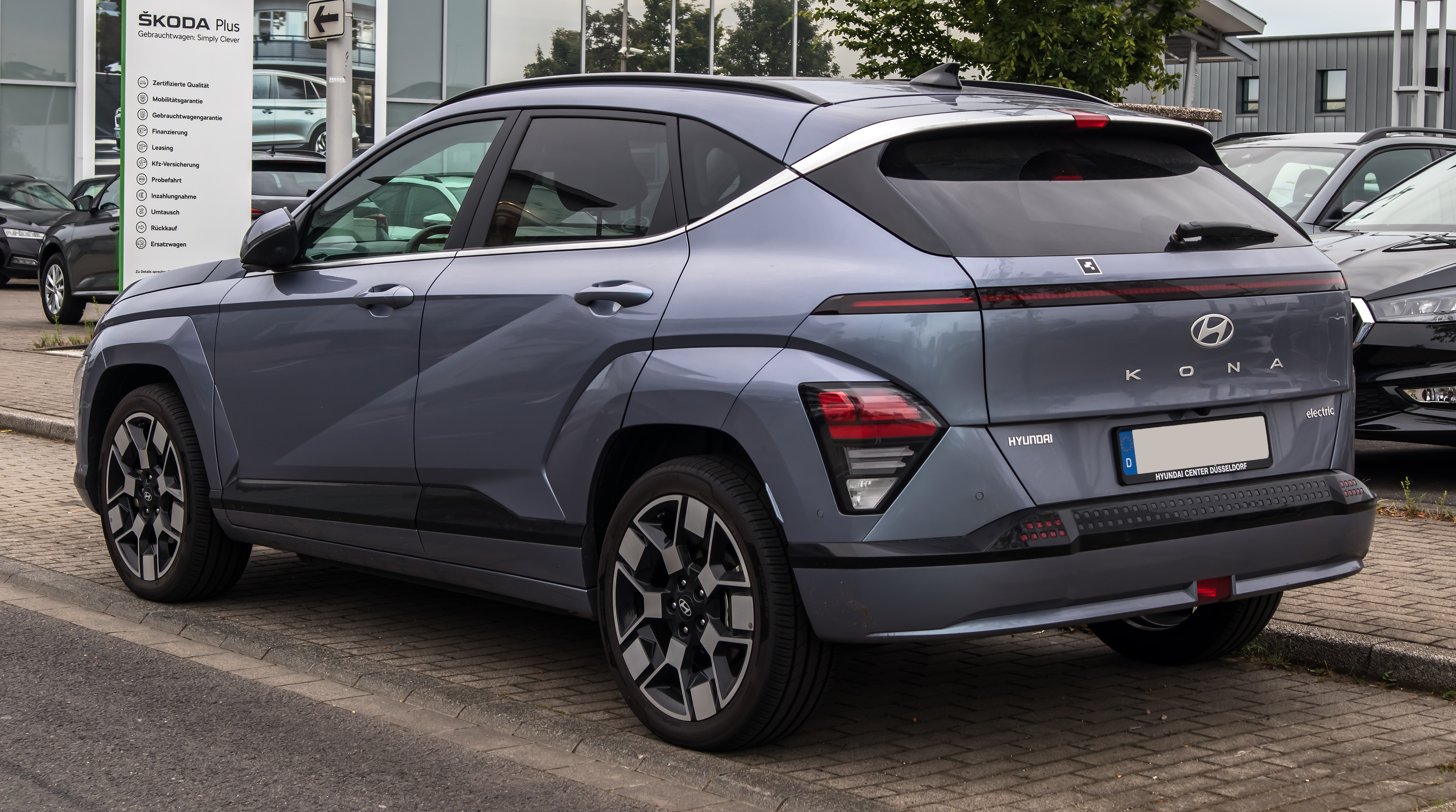
Kona Electric (rear)

=== N-Line ===
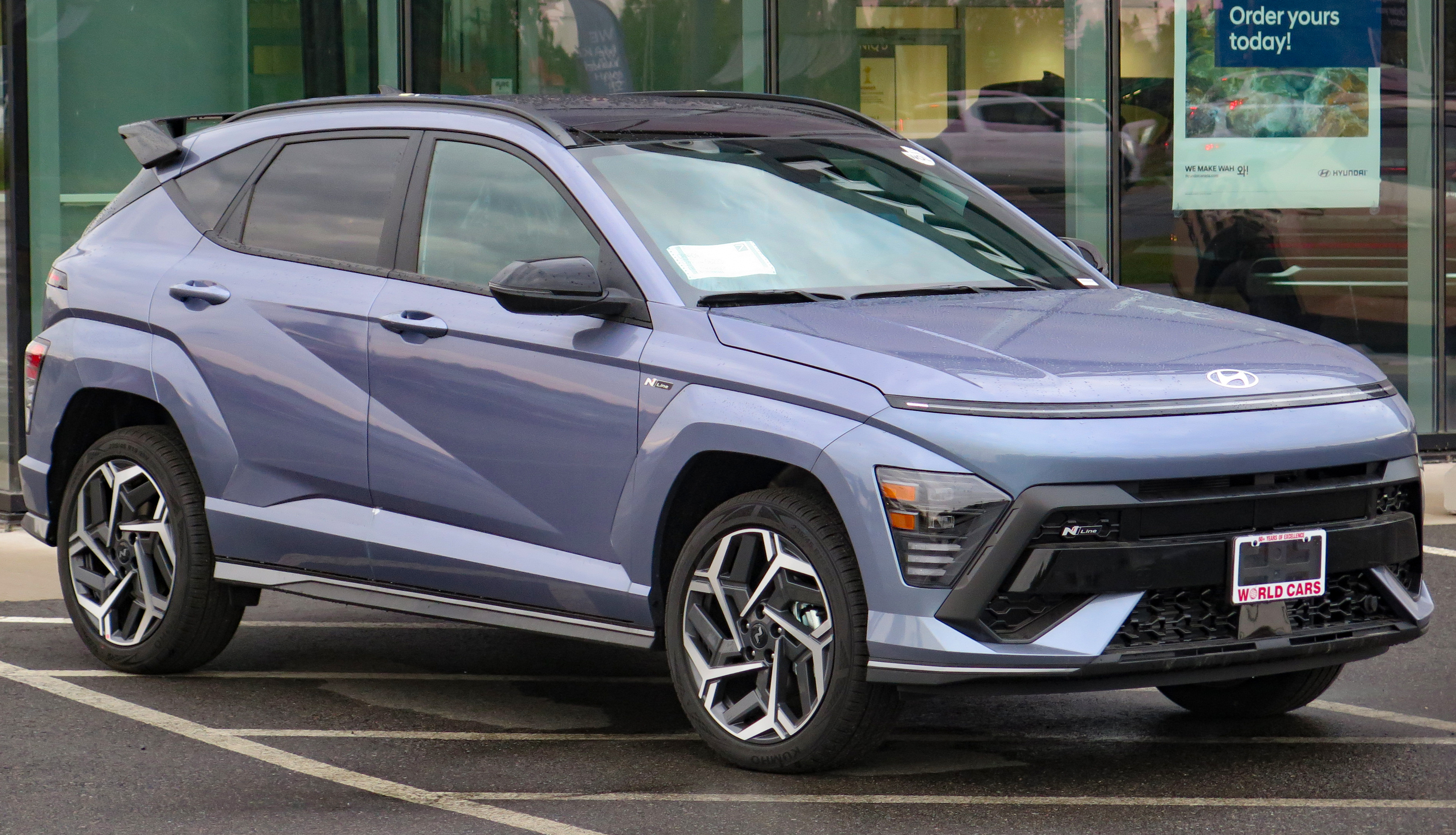
Kona N-Line

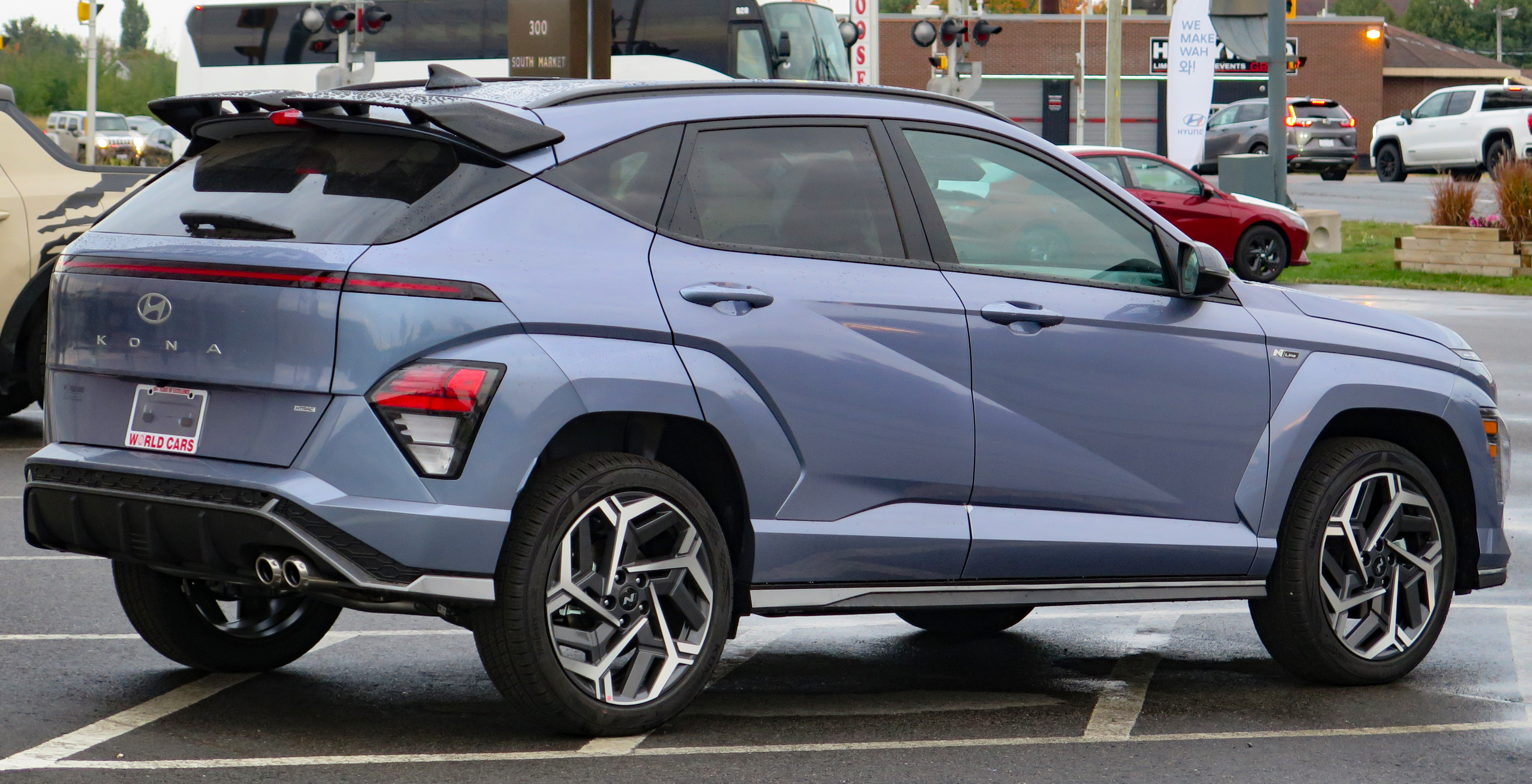
Kona N-Line (rear)

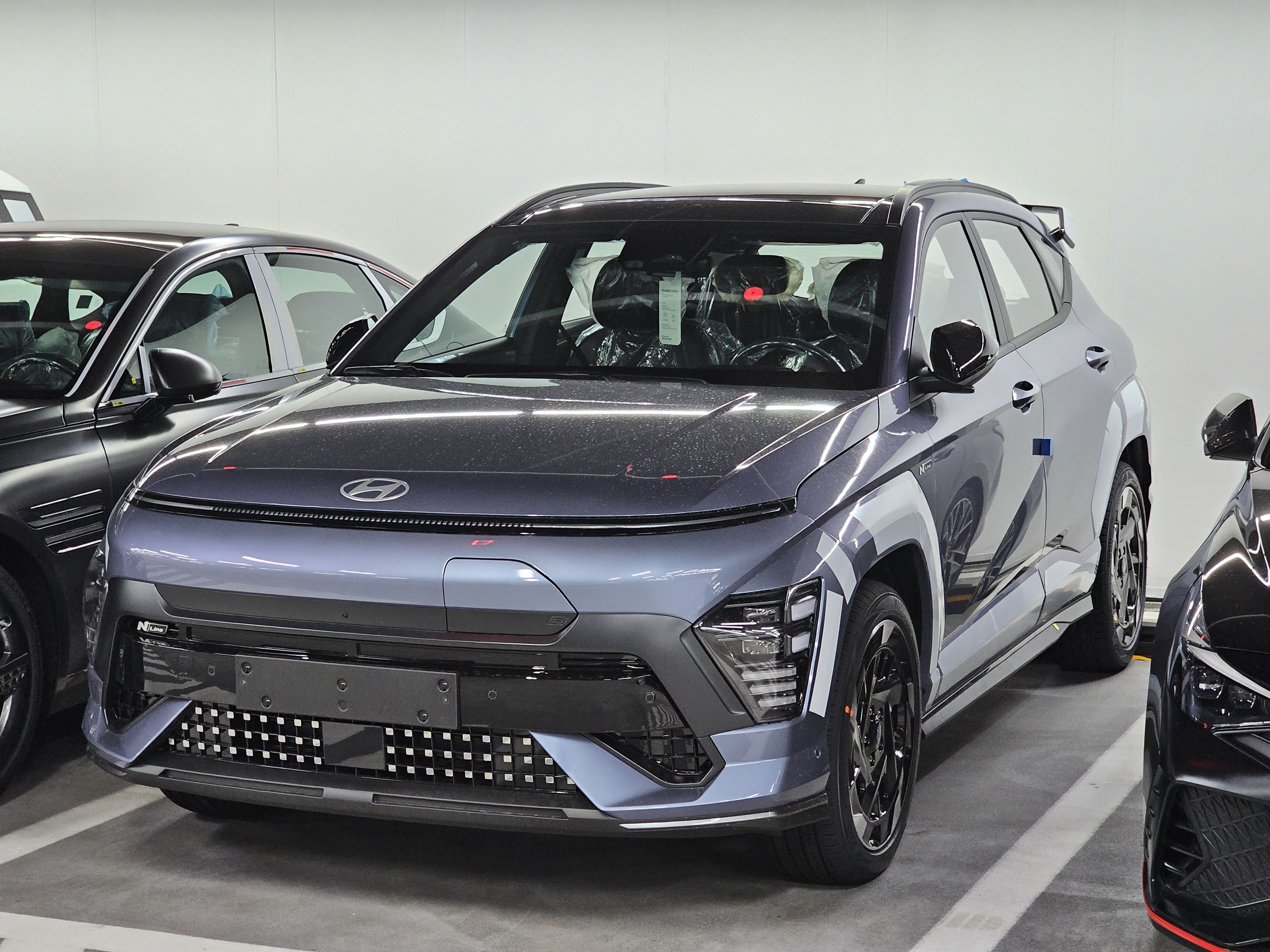
Kona Electric N-Line

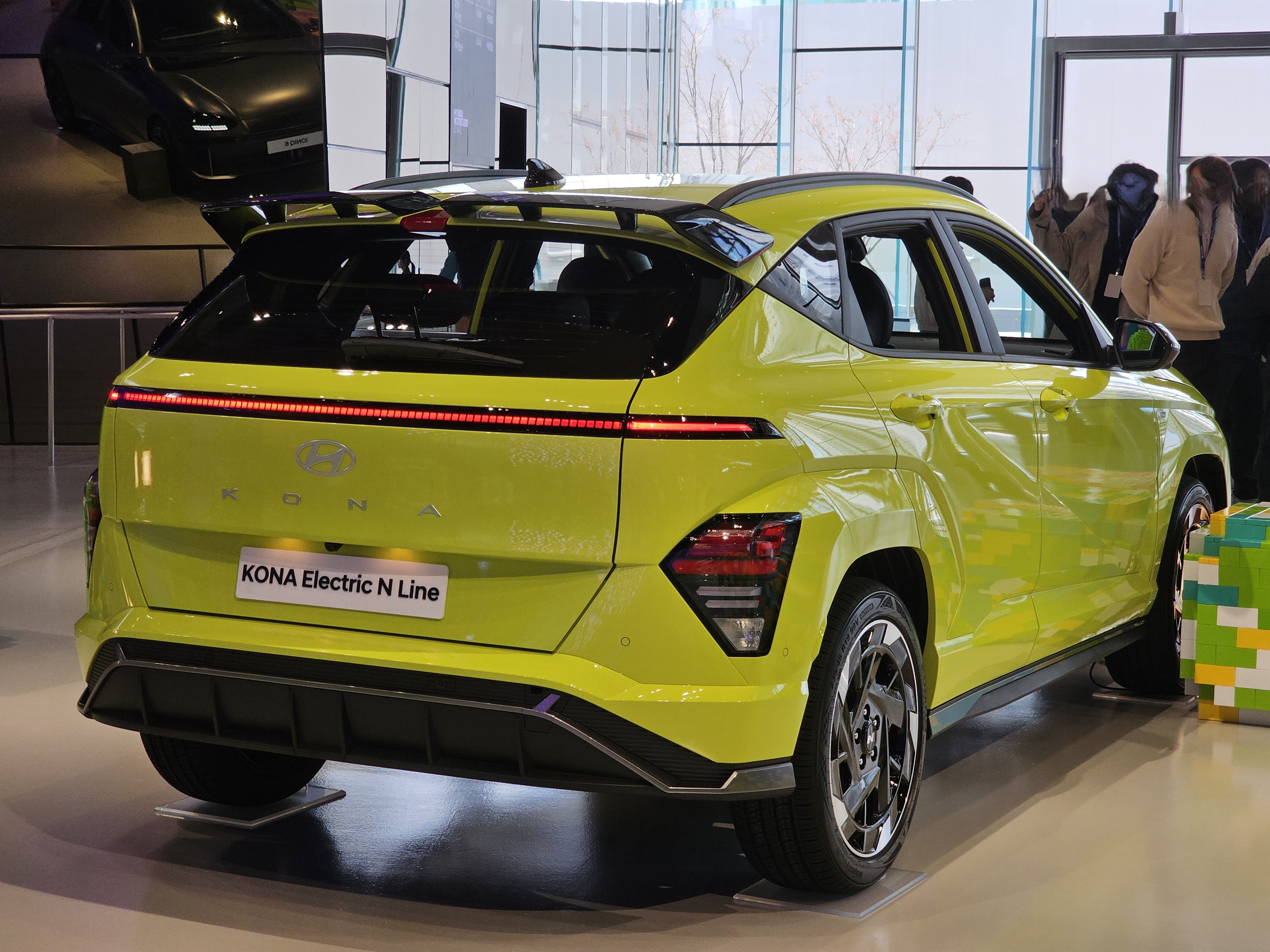
Kona Electric N-Line (rear)

=== Markets ===
==== Asia ====
===== Brunei =====
The second-generation Kona was launched in Brunei on 17 May 2024, in a sole N Line variant powered by a 1.6-litre turbocharged petrol engine. The base 2.0-litre model was added on 30 May 2025.

===== Indonesia =====
The second-generation Kona was launched for the Indonesian market on 17 July 2024 at the 31st Gaikindo Indonesia International Auto Show, where it was offered only as the battery-electric Kona Electric. Pre-orders began on 4 June 2024. A pre-production model was showcased at the 31st Indonesia International Motor Show, held from 15 to 25 February 2024, marking its initial Indonesian debut. It was later shown at select public events in Indonesia before the 31st GIIAS.

Initial variants of the Kona Electric were the Style, Prime and Signature. Battery options included the Standard Range, with a 48.6 kWh battery available for all variants, and the Long Range, with a 64.8 kWh battery available for the Prime and Signature variants.

It is assembled at the Hyundai Motor Manufacturing Indonesia (HMMI) plant in Cikarang, Bekasi, West Java. Mass production began on 16 July 2024, making it the first battery electric vehicle built in Indonesia to use a locally produced battery. The locally produced battery cells are supplied from the Hyundai LG Indonesia (HLI) Green Power plant in Karawang, West Java, which was inaugurated on 3 July 2024.

The N Line variant was added on 12 December 2024. It is the first N Line model to be marketed in Indonesia.

===== Japan =====
The Kona EV was launched in Japan in November 2023 in three trims: Casual, Voyage, and Lounge, with the N-Line model introduced later.

===== Philippines =====
The second-generation Kona was launched in the Philippines on 20 June 2025, it is available in two trim levels: GLS and Premium, powered by the 1.6-litre Hybrid petrol.

===== Singapore =====
The second-generation Kona was first launched in Singapore on 8 August 2023, in a sole variant powered by a 1.6-litre Hybrid petrol. The electric version of the Kona was launched in March 2024, with three different variants, the Standard Range, Standard Range Sunroof and Long Range Sunroof.

==== Brazil ====
The second-generation Kona was launched in Brazil on 23 May 2025, it is available in two trim levels: Ultimate and Signature, powered by the 1.6-litre Hybrid petrol.

==== Europe ====
The second-generation Kona made its European debut in April 2023. Five powertrain options are available: 1.0-litre T-GDi turbocharged petrol with a 48 volt mild hybrid system, 1.6-litre T-GDi turbocharged petrol, 1.6-litre Hybrid petrol and an Electric version with two battery options. The all-wheel drive option is available for the 1.6-litre T-GDi petrol engine. For the European market, the Kona Electric is assembled in Hyundai Motor Manufacturing Czech plant in Nošovice, Czech Republic, and the other non-electric Kona variants are imported from South Korea.

==== Middle East ====
The second-generation Kona was launched in the Middle East on 10 August 2023. It is available in three powertrains; 1.6-litre T-GDi turbocharged petrol engine, 2.0-litre MPi petrol engine, and 1.6-litre hybrid petrol engine.

==== North America ====
The second-generation Kona made its North American debut in September 2023 for the 2024 model year. Three powertrain options are available: 2.0-litre MPi petrol, 1.6-litre T-GDi turbocharged petrol, and the Electric version (with either Standard Range and Long Range battery options).

Trims
United States	Canada
SE	Essential
SEL	Preferred
N Line
Limited	N/A

In August 2024, for the 2025 model year, the N Line S trim was introduced to sit below the N Line trim, the SEL trim equipped with the Convenience package became a standalone trim level, and the N Line trim was made available for the Kona Electric model.

In July 2025, for the 2026 model year, the SEL Sport and SEL Convenience trims were introduced. The 2026 model year change saw the SEL, SEL Convenience, N Line S, N Line trims discontinued for the regular Kona models. Also for the 2026 model year, the SEL, Limited, and N Line trims were discontinued for the Kona Electric models as well as the Long Range battery option.

==== Oceania ====
===== Australia =====
The second-generation Kona was launched in Australia on 7 July 2023, with four trim levels: Base, Premium, N Line and N Line Premium. At launch, three powertrain options available: a 2.0-litre MPi petrol, a 1.6-litre Hybrid petrol and 1.6-litre T-GDi turbocharged petrol; the latter powertrain is equipped with all-wheel drive system as standard. A sportier powertrain is available for the Kona for the first time for Australia, with the option of the N Line Package. In July 2025, Hyundai Australia discontinued the 1.6-litre T-GDi turbocharged petrol engine, which had been the only Kona powertrain offered with all-wheel drive in Australia; the update left the Australian petrol and hybrid range with front-wheel-drive-only powertrains and added a mid-range Elite trim. In January 2026, the 1.6-litre T-GDi AWD powertrain briefly returned as a one-off, limited-run Premium N-Line 1.6T AWD variant.

The Kona Electric debuted in Australia on 9 January 2024, with three variants: Standard Range, Extended Range and Premium Extended Range.

===== New Zealand =====
The second-generation Kona was launched in New Zealand on 21 November 2023, with two trim levels: Active and Limited. A sportier N-Line styling package is available for the first time in New Zealand, it comes as option on the former trim but it is standard on the latter trim. At launch, three powertrain options were available: a 2.0-litre MPi petrol, a 1.6-litre Hybrid petrol and 1.6-litre T-GDi turbocharged petrol; the latter powertrain comes with HTRAC all-wheel drive system as standard.

=== Powertrain ===
Specs
Model	Year	Transmission	Power	Torque	0–100 km/h (0-62 mph) (Official)	Top speed
Petrol
Smartstream G1.0 T-GDi	2023–present	6-speed manual	120 PS (88 kW; 118 hp) @ 6,000 rpm	17.5 kg⋅m (172 N⋅m; 127 lbf⋅ft) @ 1,500–4,000 rpm	11.8s	181 km/h (112 mph)
Smartstream G1.0 T-GDi	2023–present	7-speed DCT	120 PS (88 kW; 118 hp) @ 6,000 rpm	20.4 kg⋅m (200 N⋅m; 148 lbf⋅ft) @ 2,000–3,500 rpm	11.7s	181 km/h (112 mph)
Smartstream G1.6 T-GDi	2023–present	6-speed manual	198 PS (146 kW; 195 hp) @ 6,000 rpm	27 kg⋅m (265 N⋅m; 195 lbf⋅ft) @ 1,600–4,500 rpm	8.7s	210 km/h (130 mph)
Smartstream G1.6 T-GDi	2023–present	8-speed automatic	198 PS (146 kW; 195 hp) @ 6,000 rpm	27 kg⋅m (265 N⋅m; 195 lbf⋅ft) @ 1,600–4,500 rpm		
Smartstream G1.6 T-GDi	2023–present	7-speed DCT	198 PS (146 kW; 195 hp) @ 6,000 rpm	27 kg⋅m (265 N⋅m; 195 lbf⋅ft) @ 1,600–4,500 rpm	7.8s	210 km/h (130 mph)
Smartstream G2.0 MPi	2023–present	CVT	149 PS (110 kW; 147 hp) @ 6,200 rpm	18.3 kg⋅m (179 N⋅m; 132 lbf⋅ft) @ 4,500 rpm		
Hybrid
Smartstream G1.6 GDi Hybrid	2023–present	6-speed DCT	141 PS (104 kW; 139 hp) @ 5,700 rpm	27 kg⋅m (265 N⋅m; 195 lbf⋅ft) @ 4,000 rpm	11.2s	165 km/h (103 mph)
Electric
Standard Range	2023–present	1-speed reduction gear	135 PS (99 kW; 133 hp)	26 kg⋅m (255 N⋅m; 188 lbf⋅ft)		
Standard Range	2023–present	1-speed reduction gear	156 PS (115 kW; 154 hp)	26 kg⋅m (255 N⋅m; 188 lbf⋅ft)	8.8s	162 km/h (101 mph)
Long Range	2023–present	1-speed reduction gear	204 PS (150 kW; 201 hp)	26 kg⋅m (255 N⋅m; 188 lbf⋅ft)	7.9s	
Long Range	2023–present	1-speed reduction gear	218 PS (160 kW; 215 hp)	26 kg⋅m (255 N⋅m; 188 lbf⋅ft)	7.8s	172 km/h (107 mph)

=== Safety ===
ANCAP test results Hyundai Kona (2023, aligned with Euro NCAP)
Test	Points	%
Overall:	4 /5 stars	
Adult occupant:	32.13	80%
Child occupant:	41.62	84%
Pedestrian:	40.85	64%
Safety assist:	11.17	62%

Euro NCAP test results Hyundai Kona GLS electric (LHD) (2023)
Test	Points	%
Overall:	4 /5 stars	
Adult occupant:	32.1	80%
Child occupant:	40.8	83%
Pedestrian:	40.8	64%
Safety assist:	10.8	60%

IIHS scores (North American model, 2024–2026 model years)
Small overlap front	Good
Moderate overlap front (updated test)	Good
Side (updated test)	Good
Headlights	Acceptable
Front crash prevention: vehicle-to-vehicle (standard)	Good
Front crash prevention: pedestrian (standard)	Good
Seatbelt reminders	Good
Child seat anchors (LATCH) ease of use	Acceptable

=== Recall ===
In April 2024, Hyundai Australia recalled 1,726 second-generation (SX2) Kona vehicles equipped with the 1.6-litre T-GDi turbocharged petrol engine and built from the 2023 model year. According to the recall notice, a manufacturing defect could cause the bracket retaining the engine control unit (ECU) to interfere with the vehicle's wiring in the event of a collision, causing a short circuit resulting in a vehicle fire.

In the United States, Hyundai Motor America issued a related recall in December 2023 (NHTSA campaign 23V901) covering 10,984 model-year 2024 Kona vehicles equipped with the 1.6-litre T-GDi engine and produced between June and November 2023. In the affected vehicles, the 12-volt positive battery cable could be damaged through contact with the engine control module (ECM) bracket during a frontal crash, creating an electrical short and increasing the risk of a post-crash engine compartment fire. The recall followed an engine-compartment fire observed in a Kona test vehicle during IIHS frontal crash testing; no fires in customer vehicles were reported.

== Awards ==
At the 2019 North American International Auto Show in Detroit, both the electric and non-electric versions were announced as the winners of the 2019 North American Utility Vehicle of the Year, the first for a subcompact crossover SUV in its award history.

U.S. News & World Report ranked the Hyundai Kona at No. 1 (tied with the Kia Soul and Mazda CX-30) on its list of Best Subcompact SUVs for 2022, giving it a score of 8.4 out of 10.

In 2023, Hyundai Kona won the 'Car of the Year' prize at the Auto Express New Car Awards.

== Sales ==
=== Global sales ===
Year	Kona	Kona Electric	Total
2017	60,906		60,906
2018	239,452	22,787	262,239
2019	270,169	48,451	318,620
2020	227,825	85,313	313,138
2021	187,560	45,610	233,170
2022	172,089	56,611	228,700
2023	219,761	70,871	290,632
2024	232,605	52,368	284,973
2025	258,475	47,133	305,608

=== Regional sales ===
Year	South Korea	Europe	U.S.	Canada	Australia	China	Vietnam	Indonesia		Malaysia (Note: Figures based on registration (Malaysia))
Year	South Korea	Europe	U.S.	Canada	Australia	China	Vietnam	Petrol	EV	Malaysia
2017	23,227	6,884								
2018	50,468	65,469	47,090	14,497		6,593				
2019	42,649	105,030	73,326	25,817	13,342	4,196		119		
2020	31,902	126,980	76,253	31,733	12,514	1,071	4,375	77	38	36
2021	12,244	109,934	90,069	31,101	12,748	611	5,068	9	360	100
2022	8,388	83,695	63,994	24,579	11,538				20	277
2023	34,654	83,028	79,116	22,443	11,183				10	91
2024	28,459	79,844	82,172	30,020	17,374				1,196	
2025	32,738	81,343	74,814	31,745	22,769				836	

== See also ==
- List of Hyundai vehicles
