= Kia India =

Automobile manufacturer subsidiary in India

Kia India Pvt Ltd
- Type: Subsidiary
- Industry: Automotive
- Founded: 19 May 2017; 9 years ago
- Headquarters: Penukonda, Sri Sathya Sai District, Andhra Pradesh, India
- Key people: Gwanggu lee (CEO)
- Products: Automobiles
- Production output: 336,619 (2022)
- Parent: Kia
- Website: www.kia.com/in/

Kia India Private Limited is a subsidiary of Kia for its operations in India. The company was founded on 19 May 2017 following an announcement of the construction of a new 536-acre manufacturing facility in Penukonda, Sri Sathya Sai District, Andhra Pradesh. The plant started its trial production in January 2019 and the mass production of its first product, the Kia Seltos started on 31 July 2019. The US$2 billion manufacturing plant is capable of producing 300,000 vehicles annually.

== Products ==
Kia India produces several models that were developed specifically for the Indian market, namely the SP2i version of the Seltos and the sub-4 metre SUV Sonet. Within less than four years of operations, in May 2023 the company announced that it has achieved a milestone of 700,000 vehicle sales.

By November 2024, the firm had exported over 100,000 CKD kits from the Anantapur plant.

=== Current models ===
==== ICE vehicles ====
Model	Indian introduction	Current model		Notes
Model	Indian introduction	Introduction (model code)	Update (facelift)	Notes
SUV/crossover
Sonet	2020	2020 (QY)	2024	
Syros	2025	2025 (AY)	—	
Seltos	2019	2026 (SP3i)	—	
Sorento	2026	2026 (MQ4)	—	CKD
MPV
Carens	2022	2022 (KY)	2025	Facelift sold as Carens Clavis
Carnival	2020	2024 (KA4)	—	Locally produced (2020~2023); Imported from South Korea

==== Electric vehicles ====
Model	Indian introduction	Current model		Notes
Model	Indian introduction	Introduction (model code)	Update (facelift)	Notes
SUV/crossover
Syros EV	2026	2026 (AY)	—	
EV6	2022	2022 (CV)	2025	Imported from South Korea
EV9	2024	2024 (MV)	—	Imported from South Korea
MPV
Carens Clavis EV	2025	2025 (KY)	—	

== Statistics ==
Year	Production	Domestic sales	Exports
2019	57,719	44,918	755
2020	177,982	139,714	29,358
2021	227,844	182,655	53,247
2022	336,619	254,556	82,063
2023		255,000	
2024		245,000	

== See also ==
- Hyundai Motor India
- Automotive industry in India
