= Hyundai-Kia K platforms =

Overview
- Manufacturer: Hyundai; Kia Motors
- Production: 2017–present

Body and chassis
- Class: City car (A); Subcompact car/supermini (B); Compact car (C)
- Layout: Front-engine, front-wheel-drive Front-engine, all-wheel-drive
- Platform: K1; K2; K3

Chronology
- Predecessor: Hyundai-Kia SA platform Hyundai-Kia BA platform Hyundai-Kia PB platform Hyundai-Kia GB platform Hyundai-Kia J6 platform

The K platform series are platforms developed by Hyundai and Kia for its range of automobiles since 2017.

== K1/K2-P1 (KP1) platform ==
The K1 platform is utilized for entry subcompact models (A-segment). It was introduced in 2018 coinciding with the launch of the second generation Hyundai Santro, replacing the SA platform and BA platform. It is a modified version of the SA platform, and Hyundai claimed the K1 platform is 63 percent more rigid than its predecessor. Two wheelbase variations are available, which are 2,400 mm (94.5 inches) and 2,450 mm (96.5 inches).

Vehicles using platform (calendar years):

- Hyundai Santro/Atos/Eon (AH2) (2018–2022)
- Hyundai Grand i10 Nios (AI3) (2019–present)
- Hyundai Aura/Grand i10 sedan (AI3) (2020–present)
- Hyundai Casper (AX1) (2021–present)
- Hyundai Exter (AI3 CUV) (2023–present)
- Hyundai Venue (QU2) (2025–present)
- Kia Syros (AY) (2025–present)
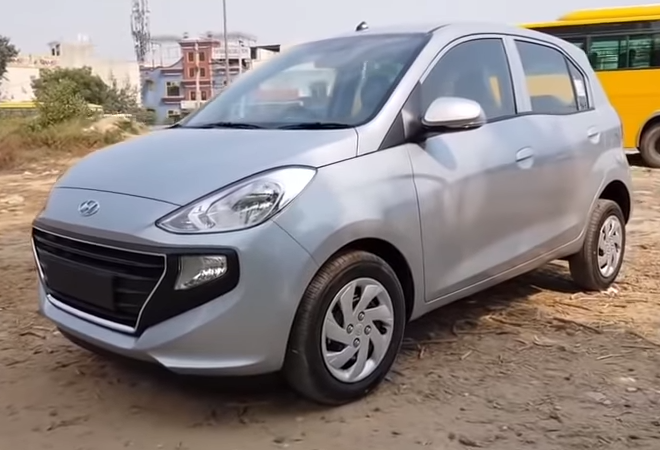
Hyundai Santro (AH2)

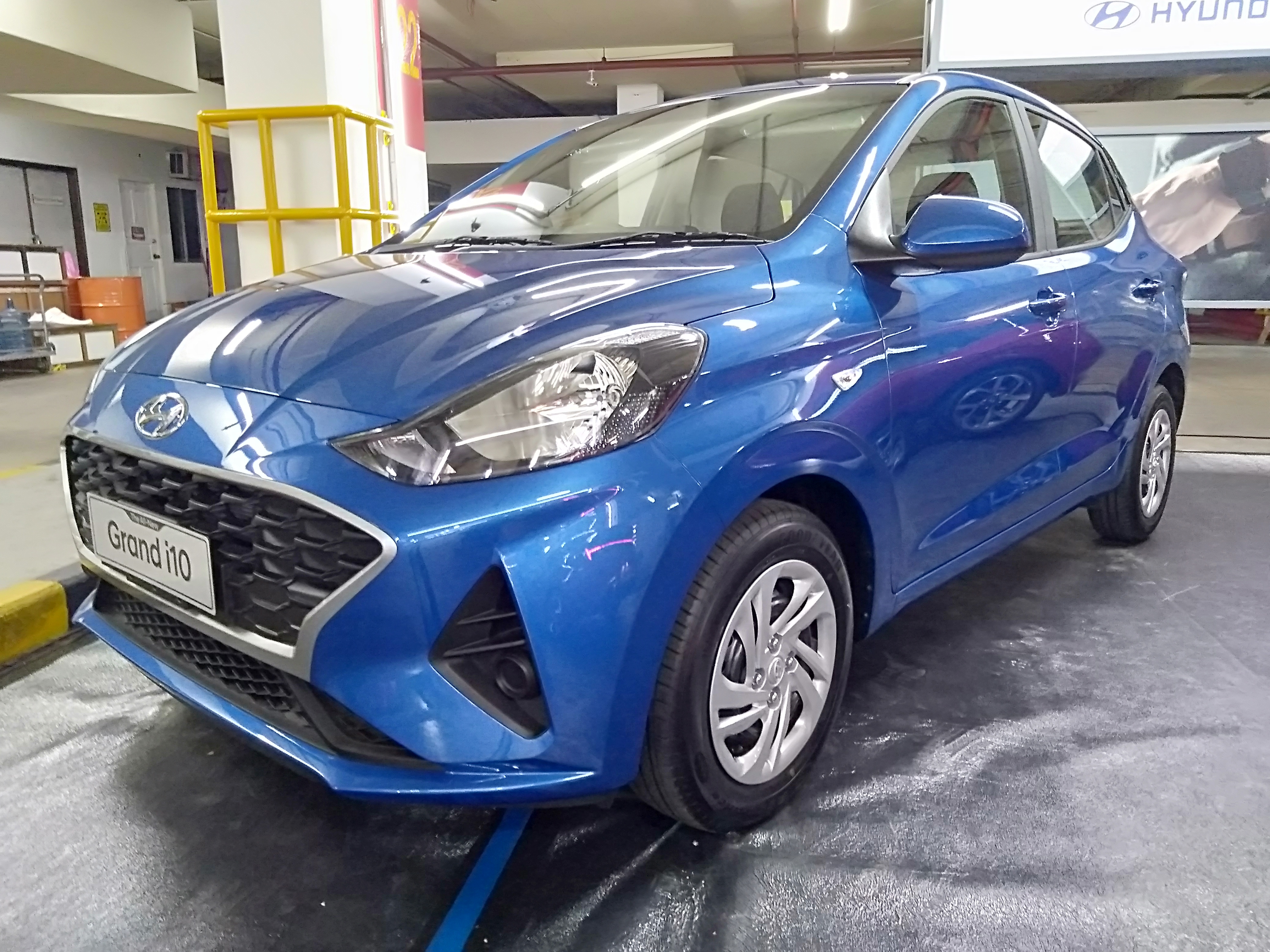
Hyundai Grand i10 sedan (AI3)

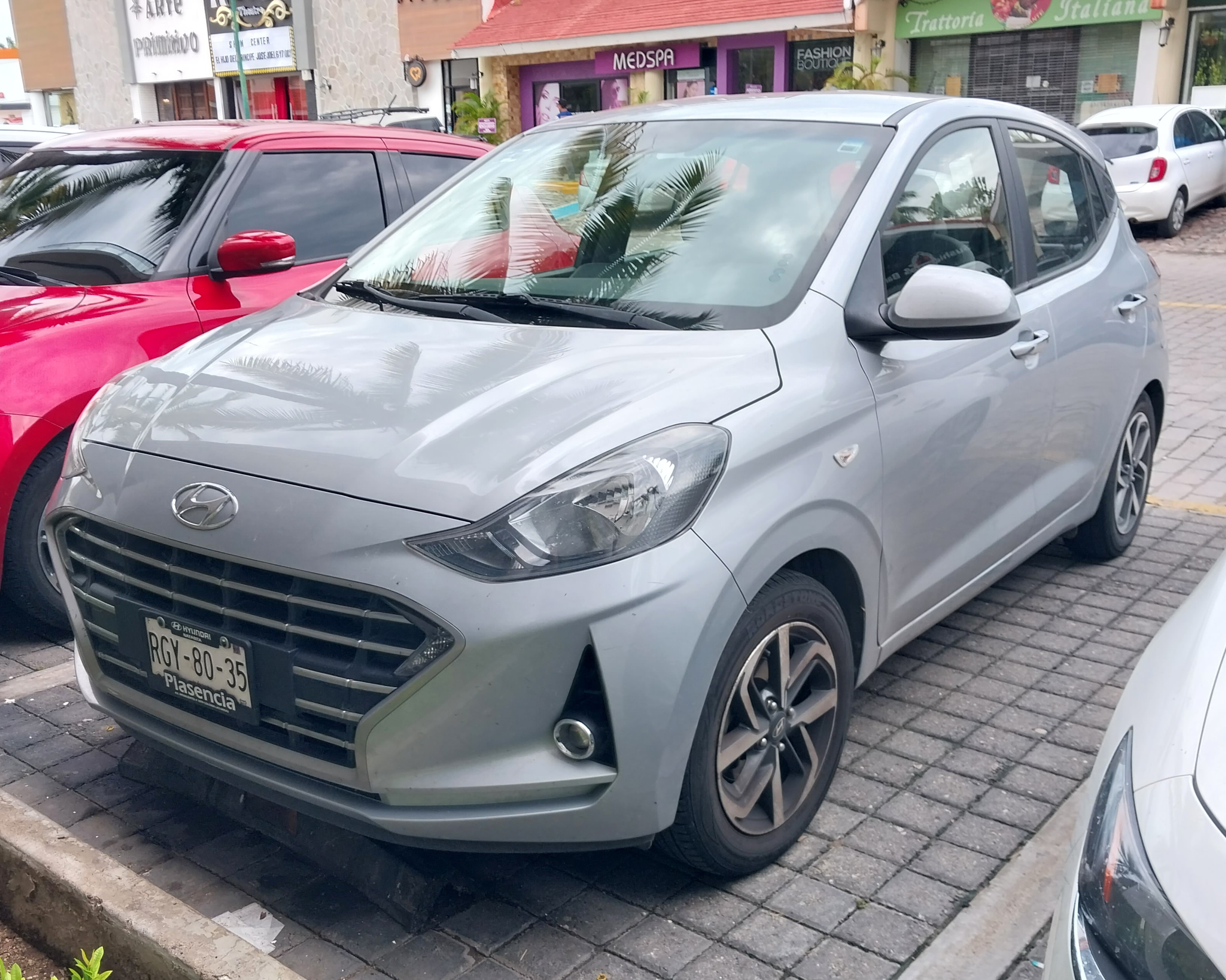
Hyundai Grand i10 Nios (AI3)

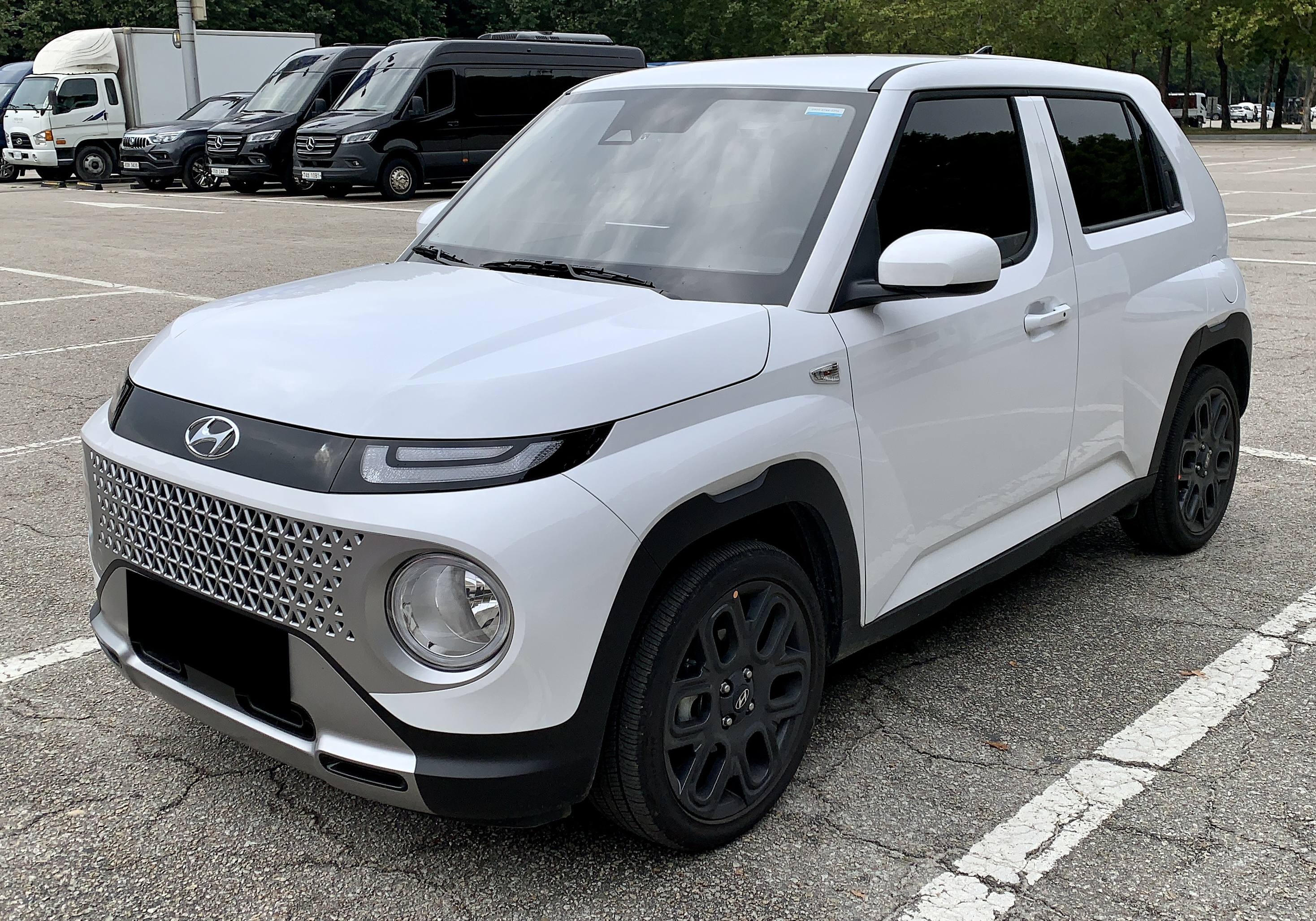
Hyundai Casper (AX1)

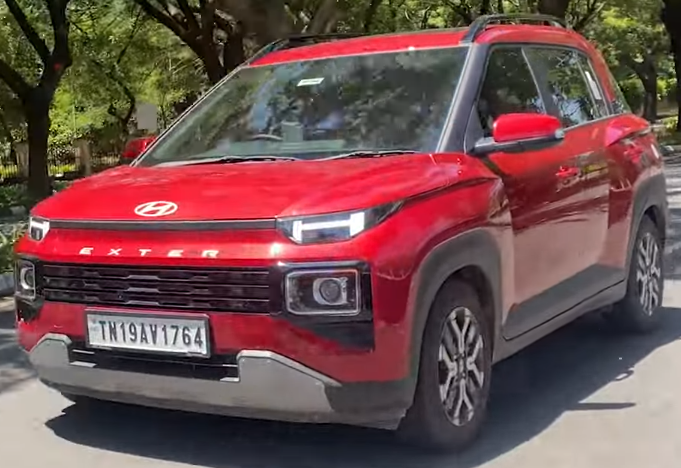
Hyundai Exter (AI3 CUV)

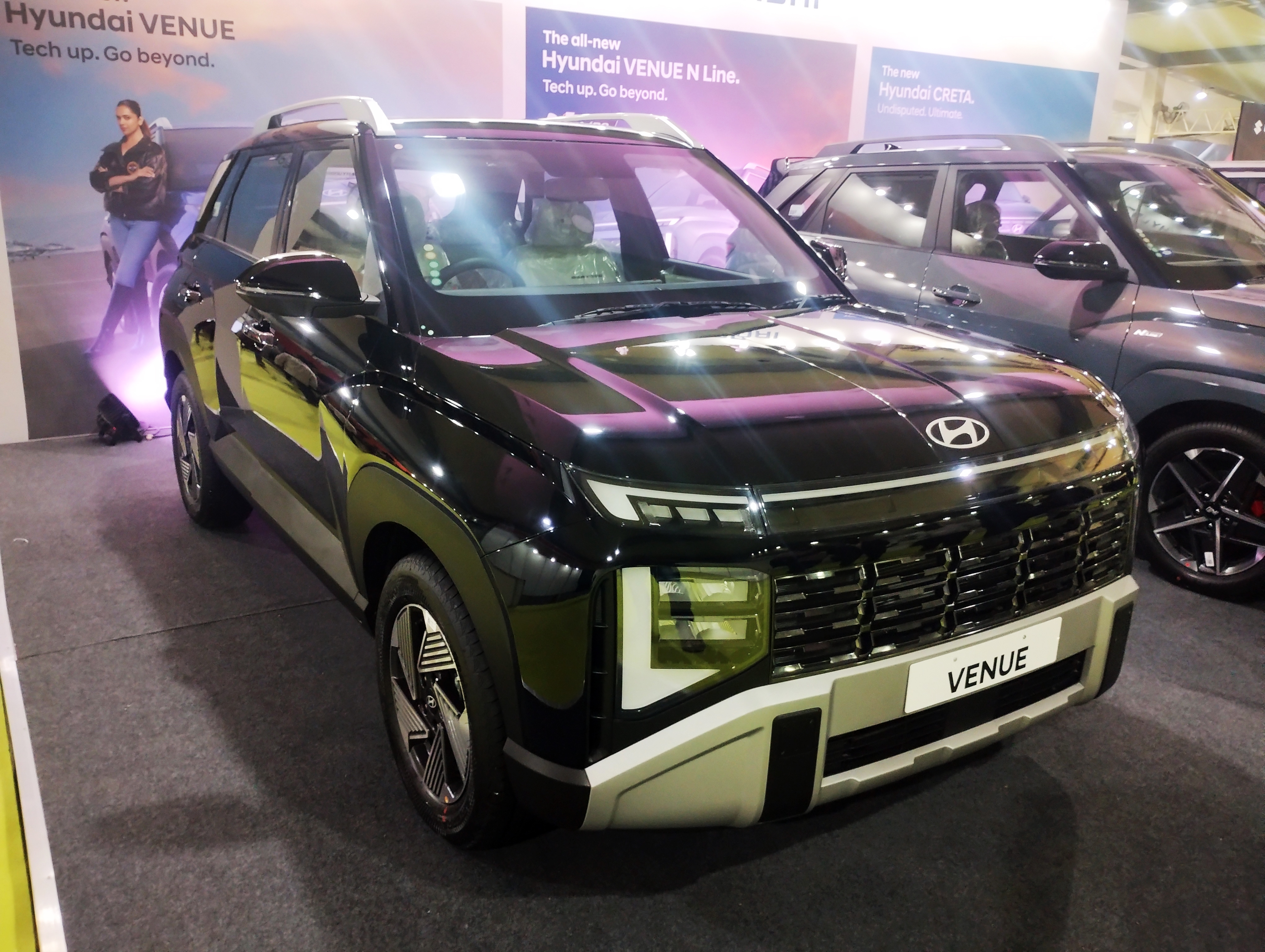
Hyundai Venue (QU2)

== K1 BEV platform ==
Introduced in 2024, the K1 BEV platform is a dedicated battery electric vehicle platform for the small segment of Hyundai E-GMP derived from the K1 platform.

- Hyundai Casper Electric / Inster (AX1 EV) (2024–present)
- Kia Syros EV (2026–present)
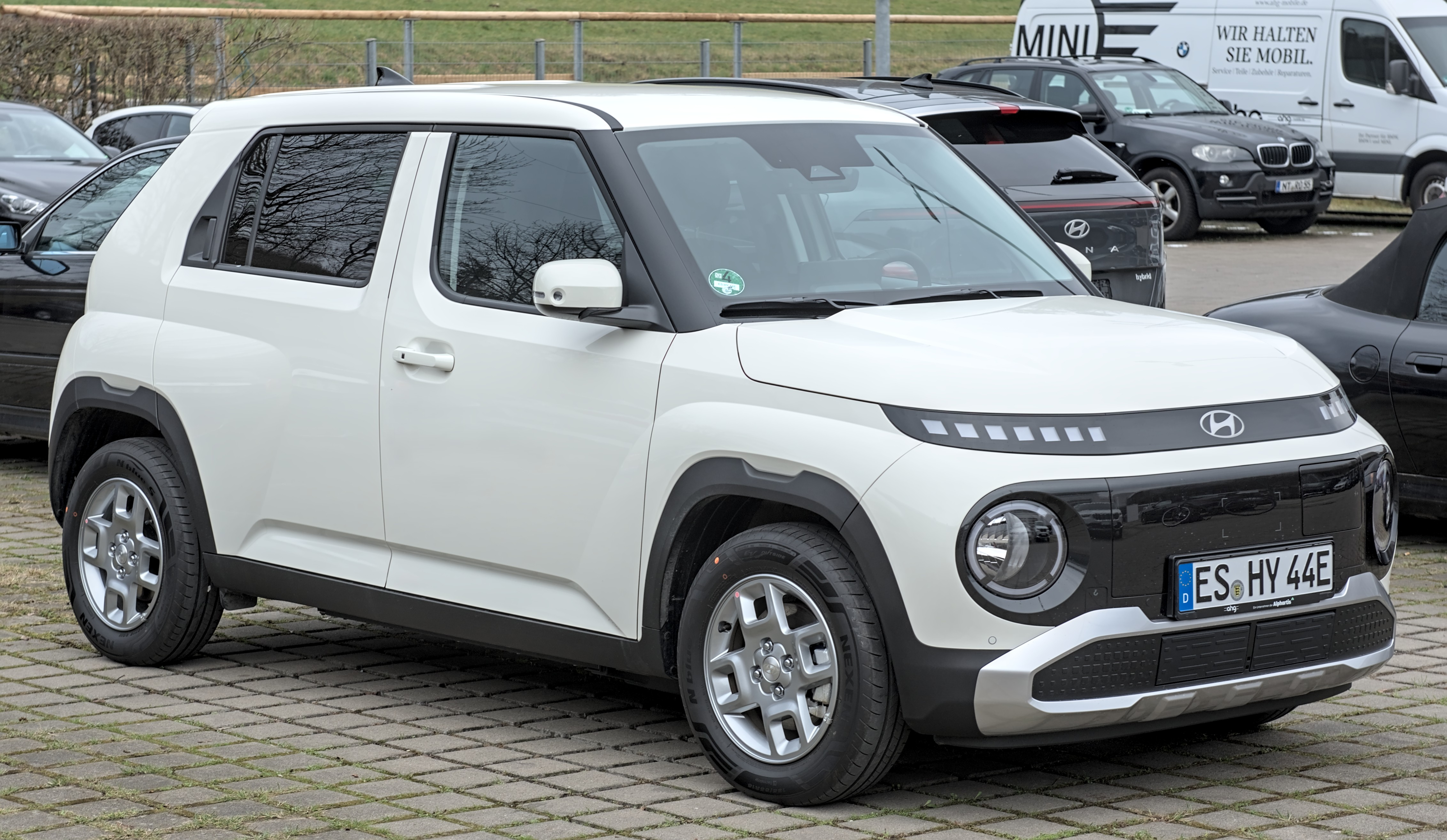
Hyundai Casper Electric / Inster EV (AX1 EV)

== K1/K2-P2 (KP2) platform ==
Introduced in 2017, the K1/K2-P2 platform is mainly utilized for B-segment vehicles.

Vehicles using platform (calendar years):

- Hyundai i20 (BC3/BI3) (2020–present)
- Hyundai Accent/Verna/Solaris (HC/YC) (2017–2023)
- Kia Stonic/KX1 (YB CUV) (2018–present)
- Kia Rio/K2/KX Cross (FB) (2017–2022)
- Kia Rio (YB) (2017–2023)
- Hyundai Kona (OS) (2017–2023)
- Hyundai Venue (QX) (2019–2026)
- Hyundai Creta/Cantus (SU2) (2019–present)
- Hyundai Alcazar (SU2 LWB) (2021–present)
- Kia Carens (KY) (2022–present)
- Kia Seltos/KX3 (SP2i/SP2c) (2019–present)
- Kia Sonet (QY) (2020–present)
- Hyundai Bayon (BC3 CUV) (2021–present)
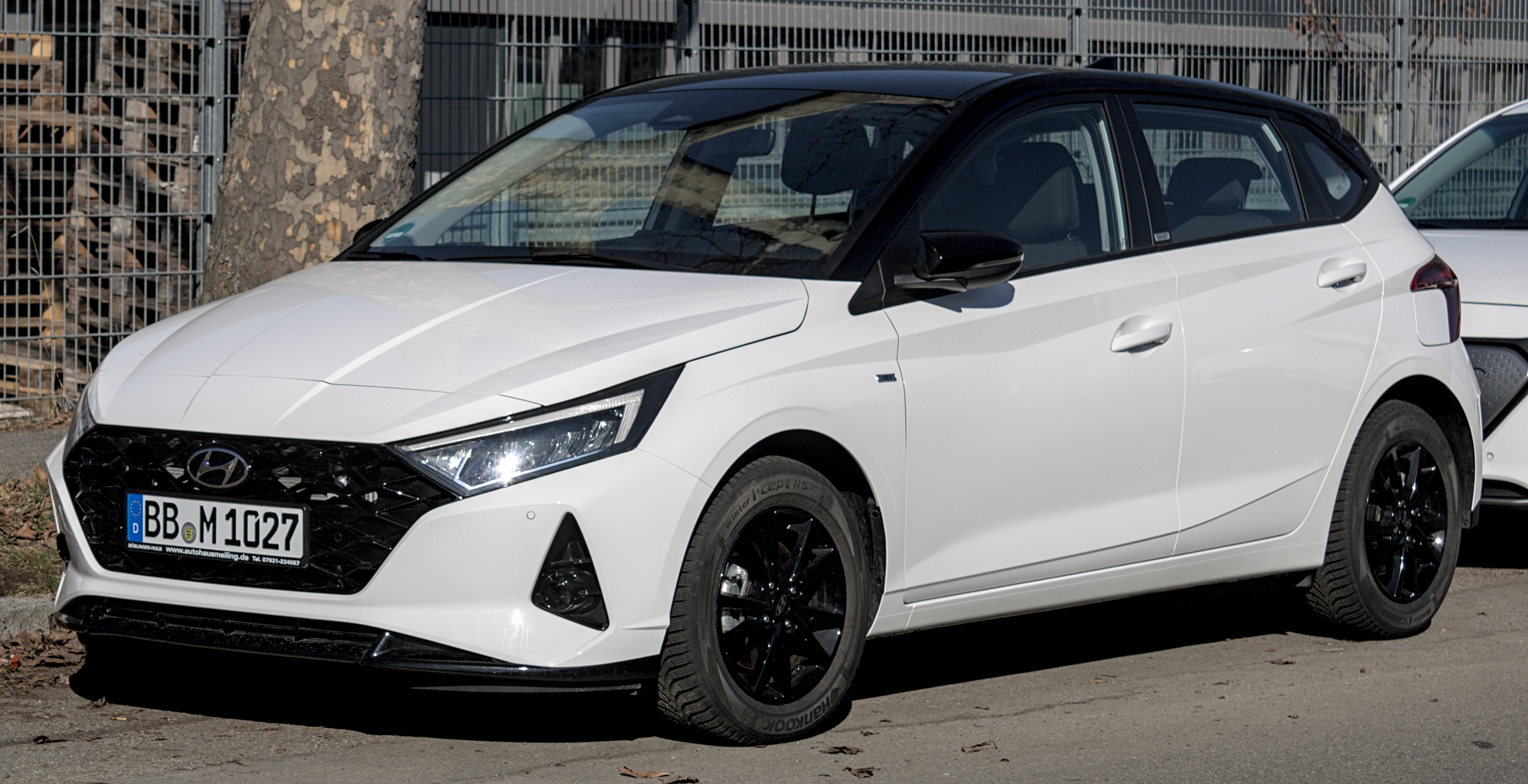
Hyundai i20 (BC3)

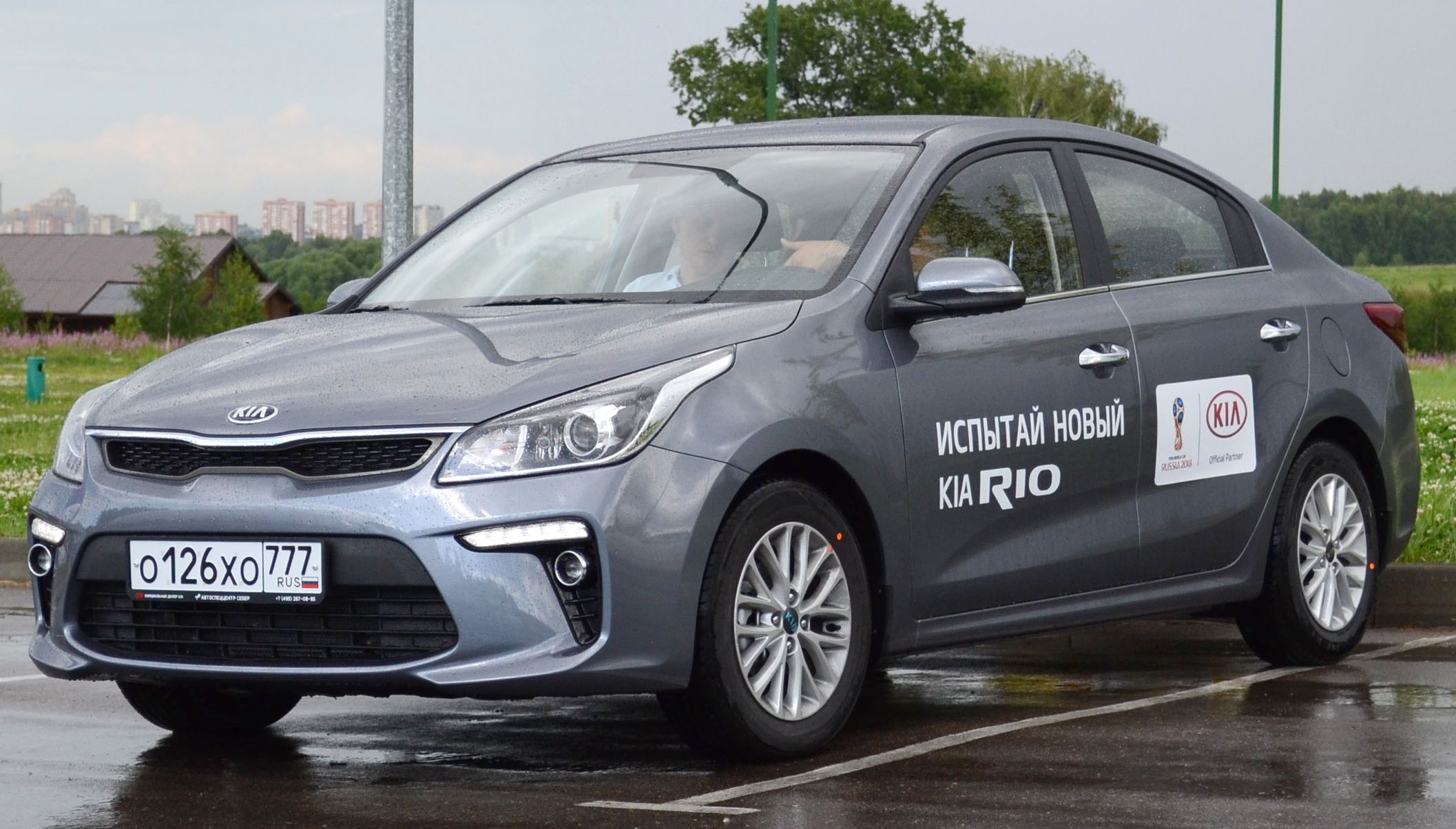
Kia Rio (FB)

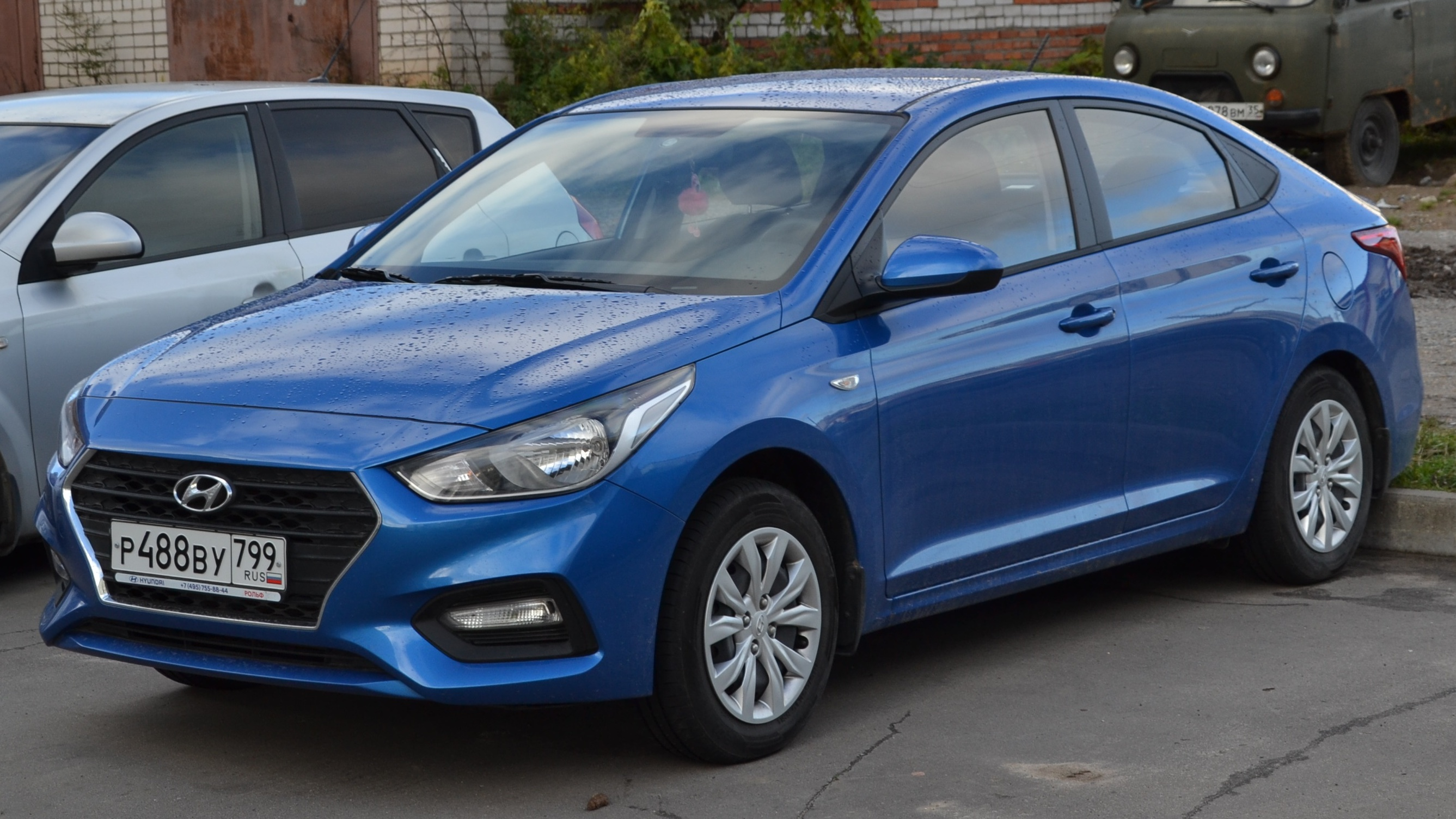
Hyundai Solaris (HC)

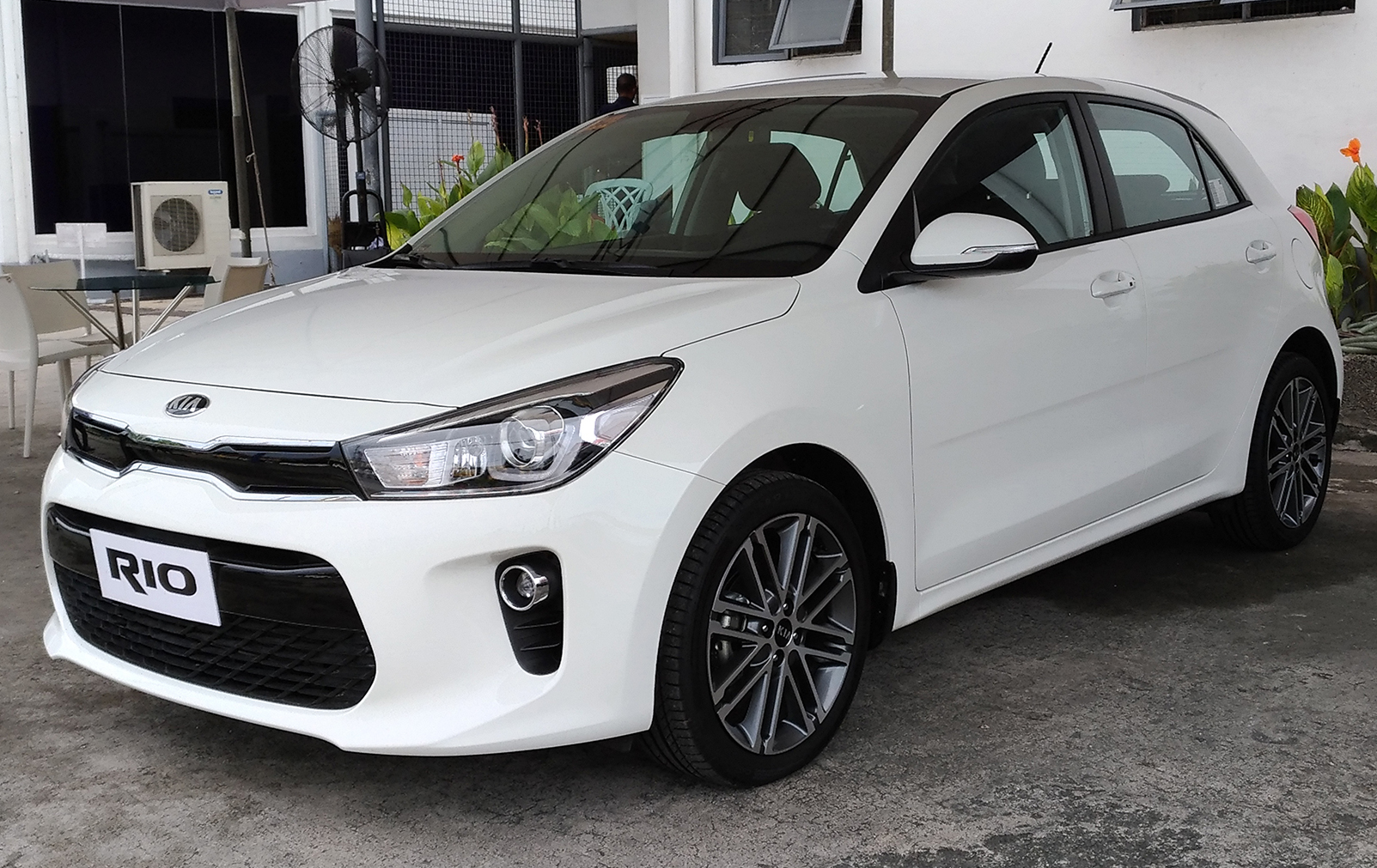
Kia Rio (YB)

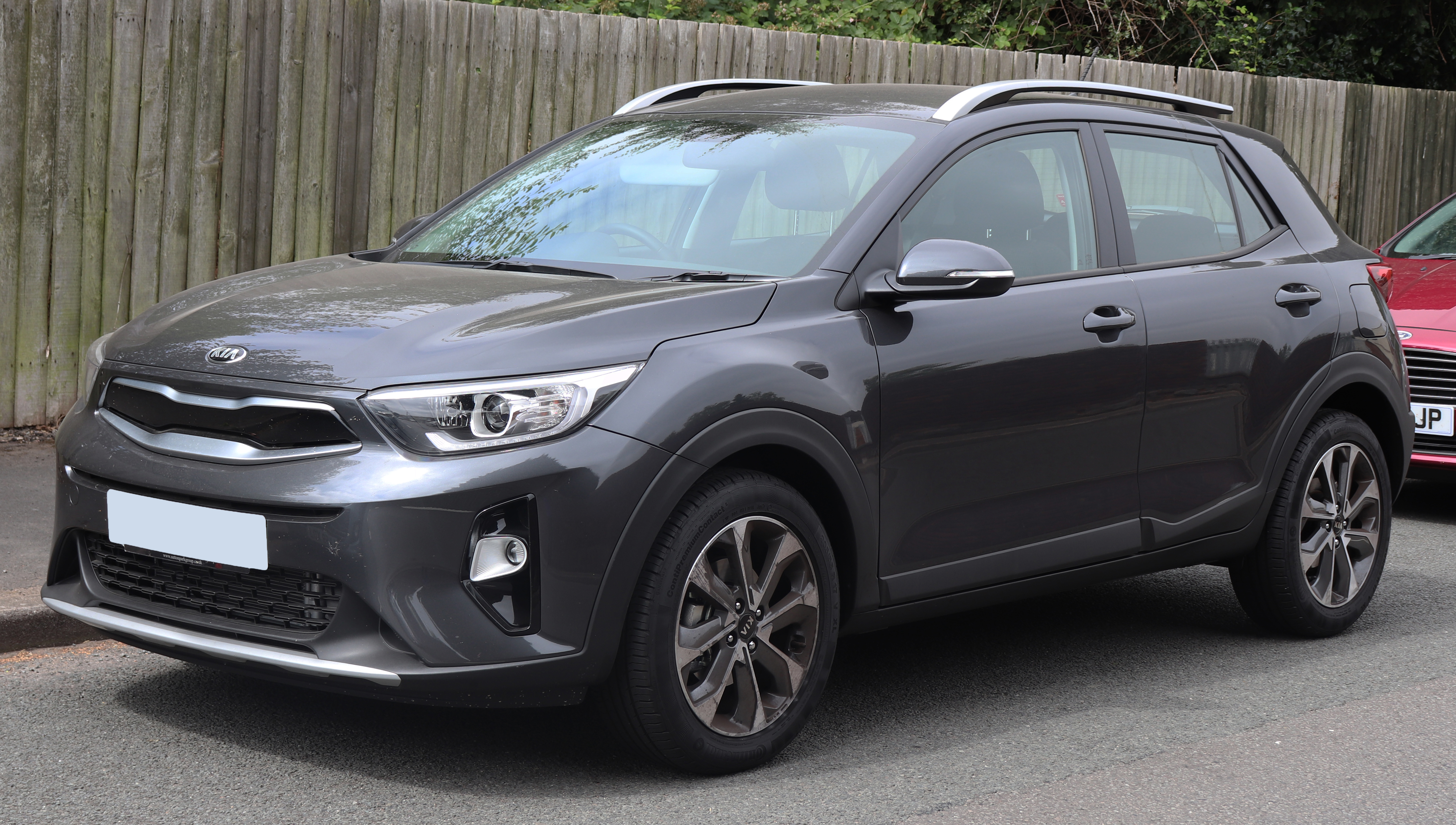
Kia Stonic (YB CUV)

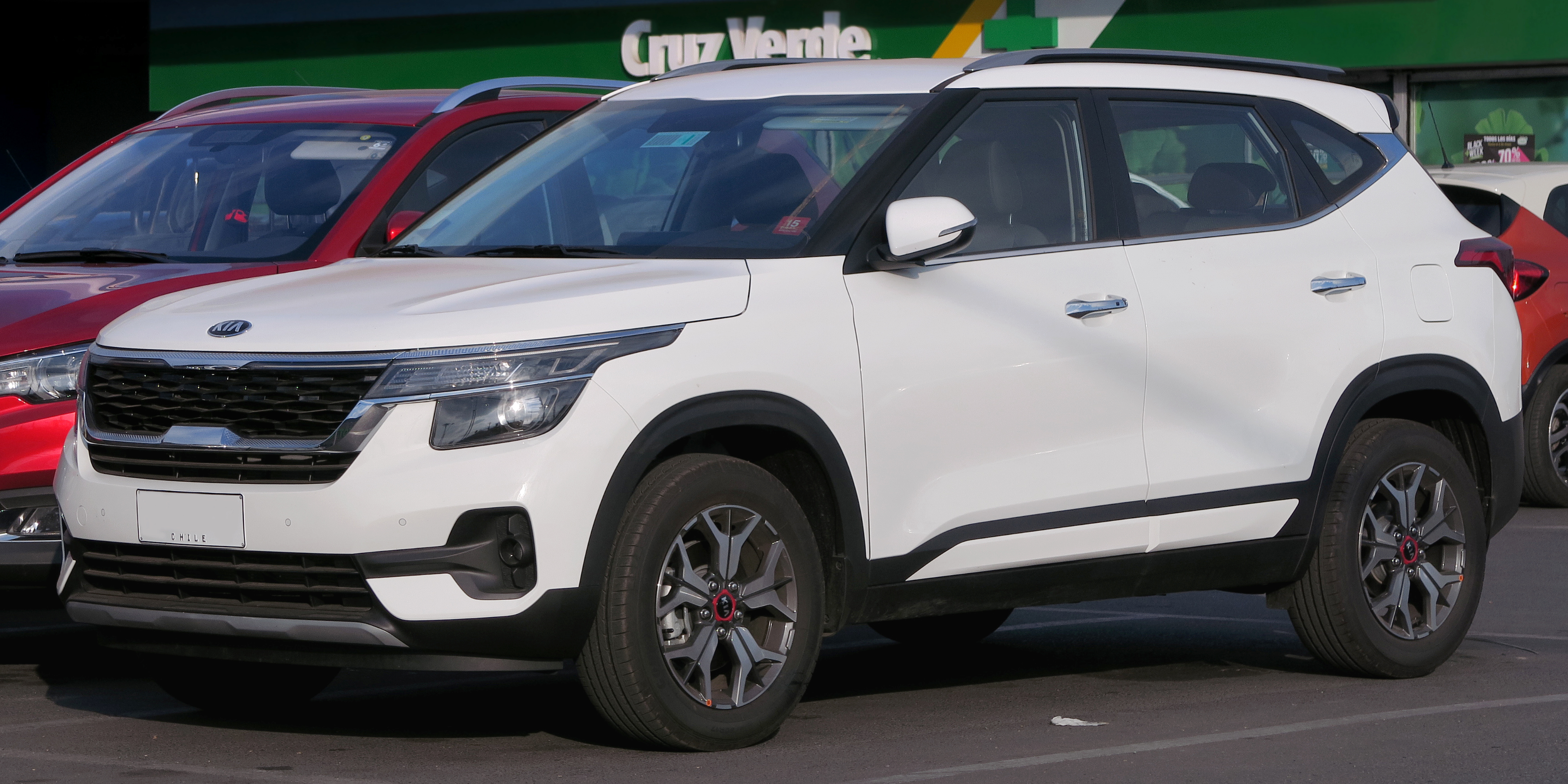
Kia Seltos (SP2i)

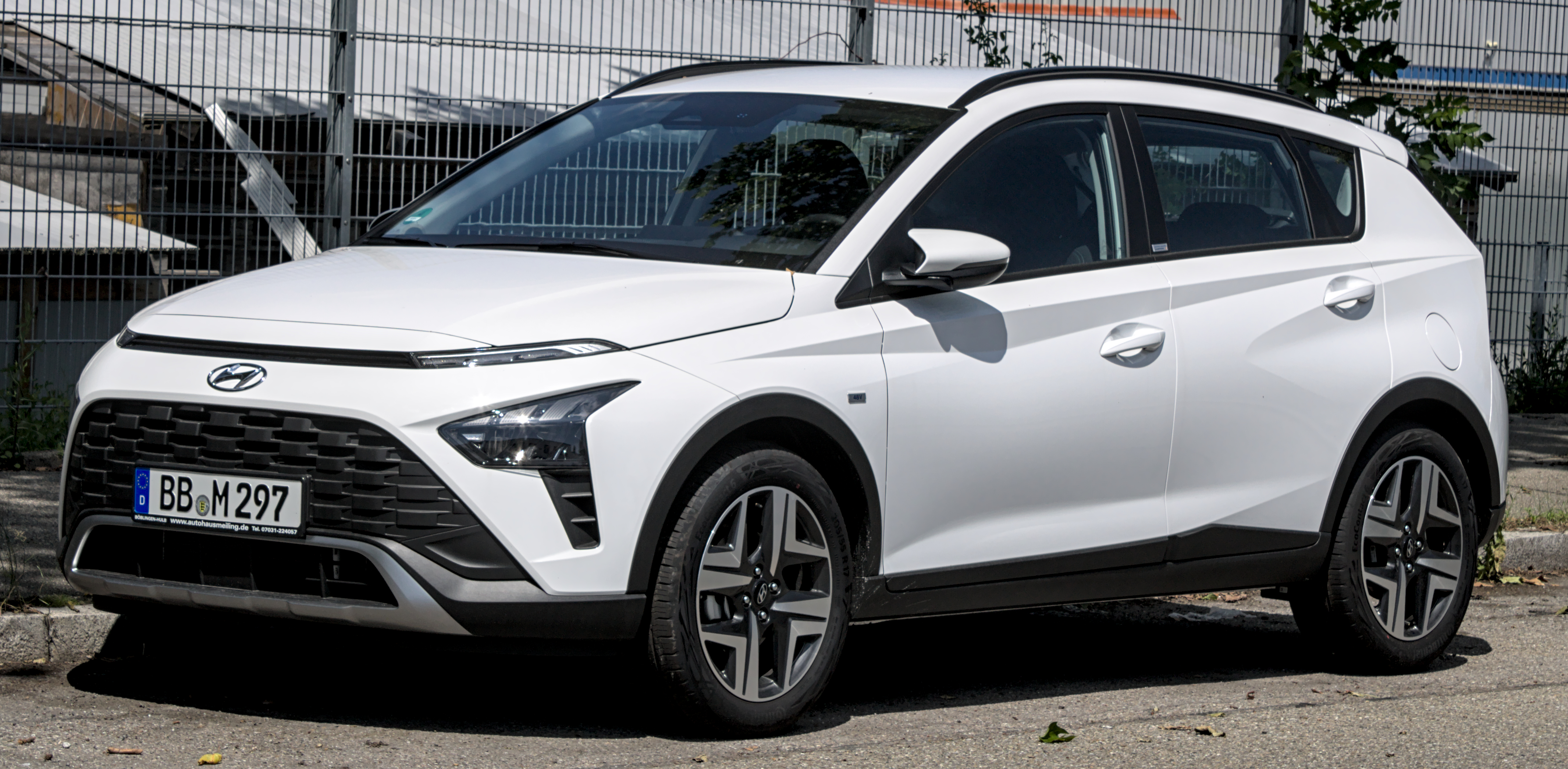
Hyundai Bayon (BC3 CUV)

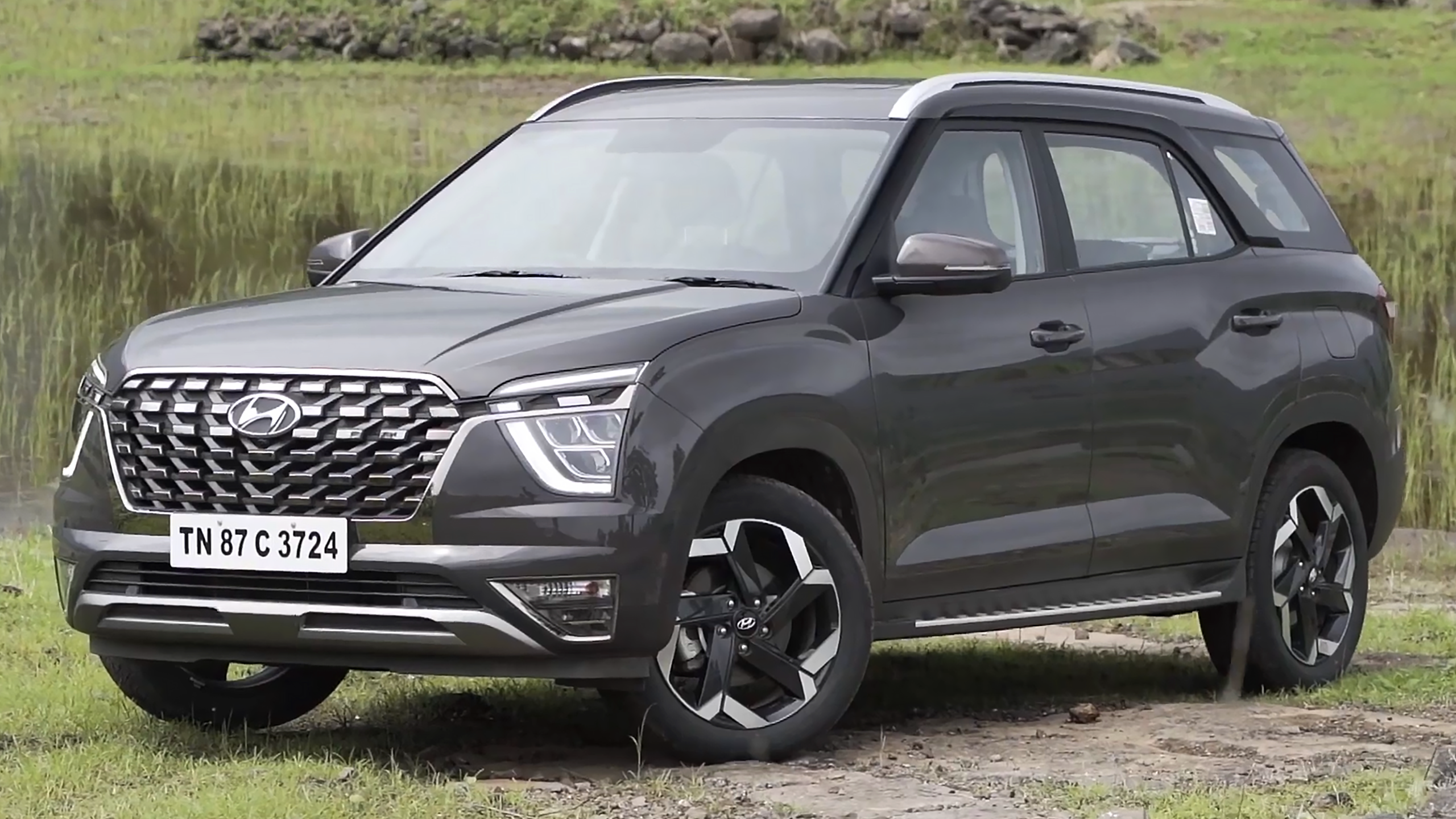
Hyundai Alcazar/Grand Creta(SU2 LWB)

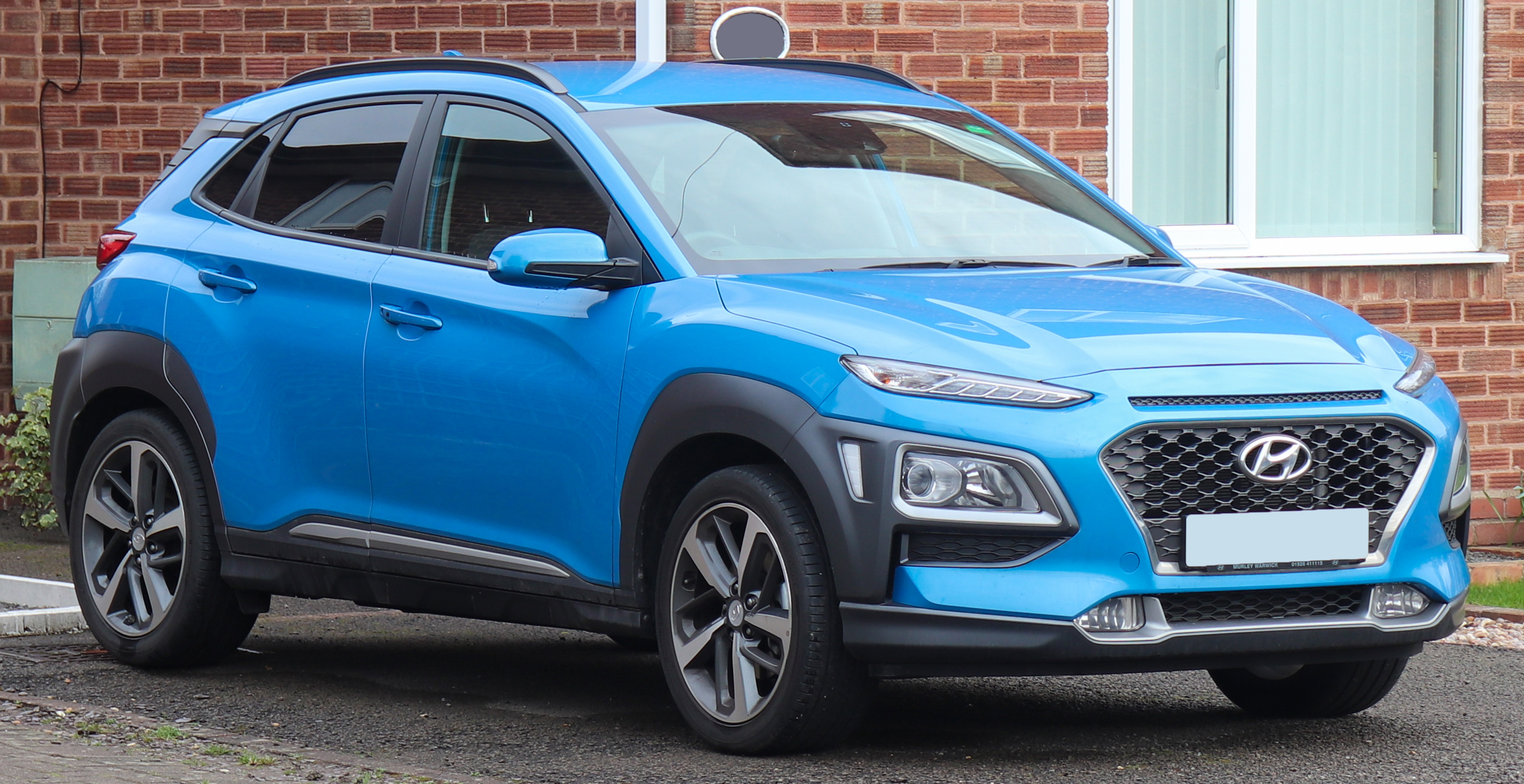
Hyundai Kona (OS)

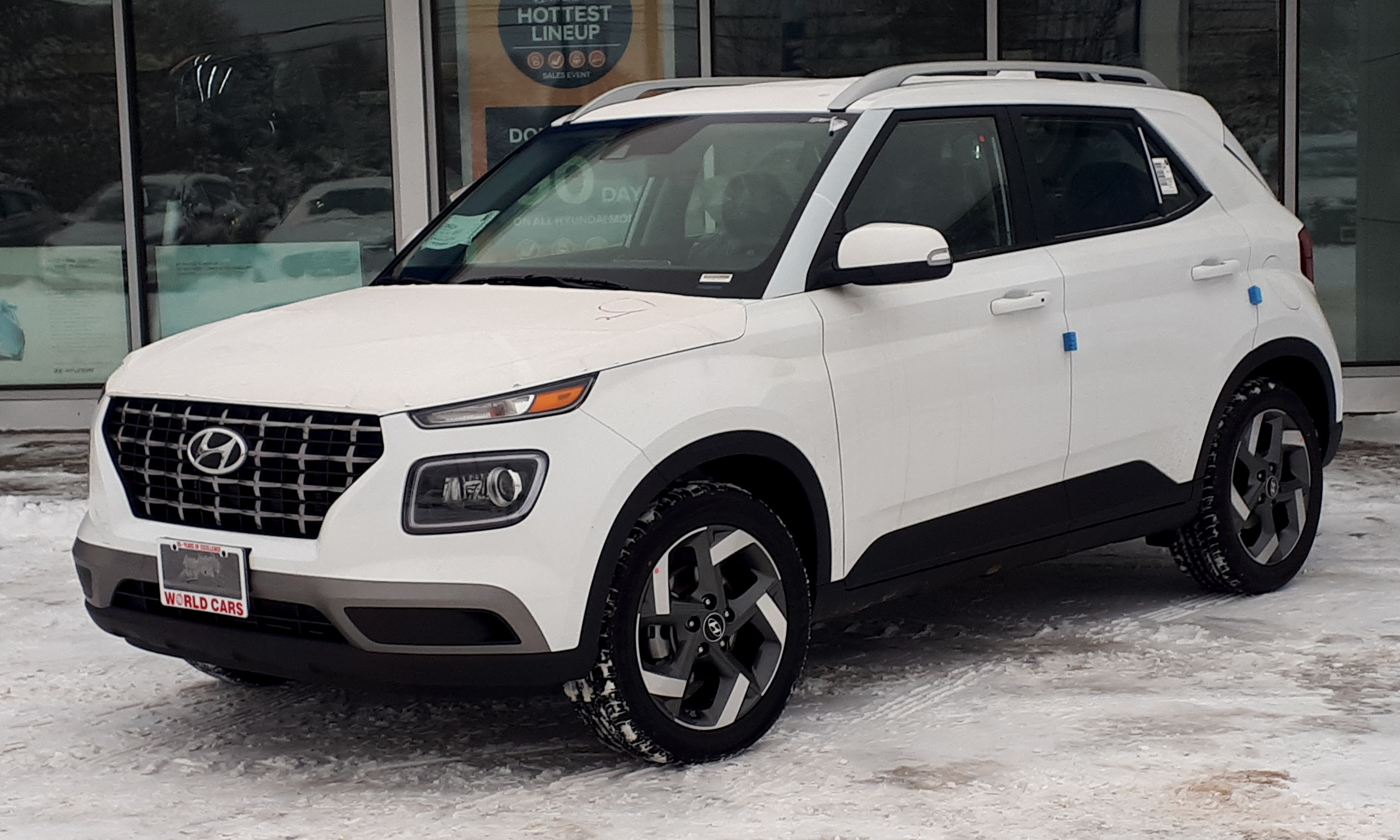
Hyundai Venue (QX)

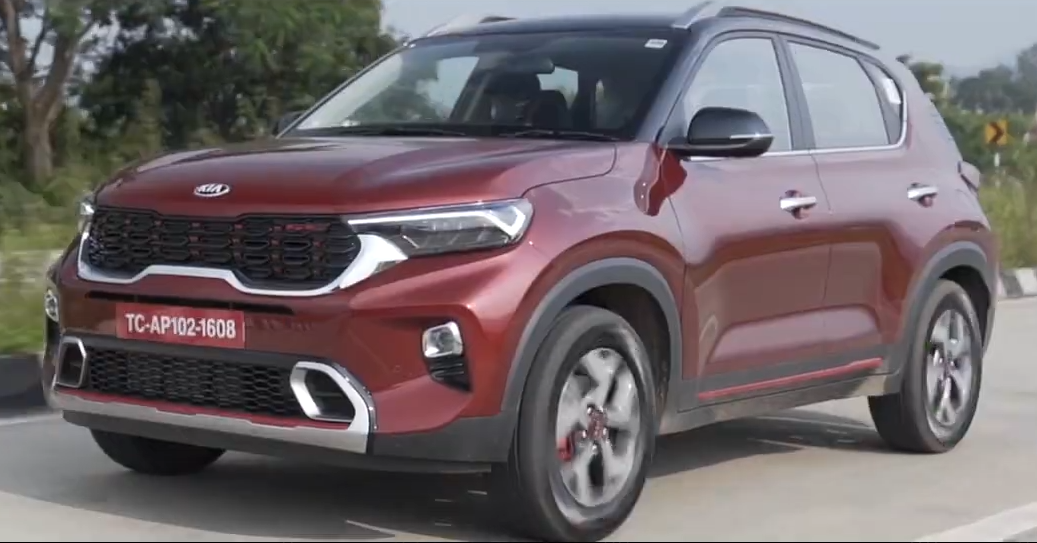
Kia Sonet (QY)

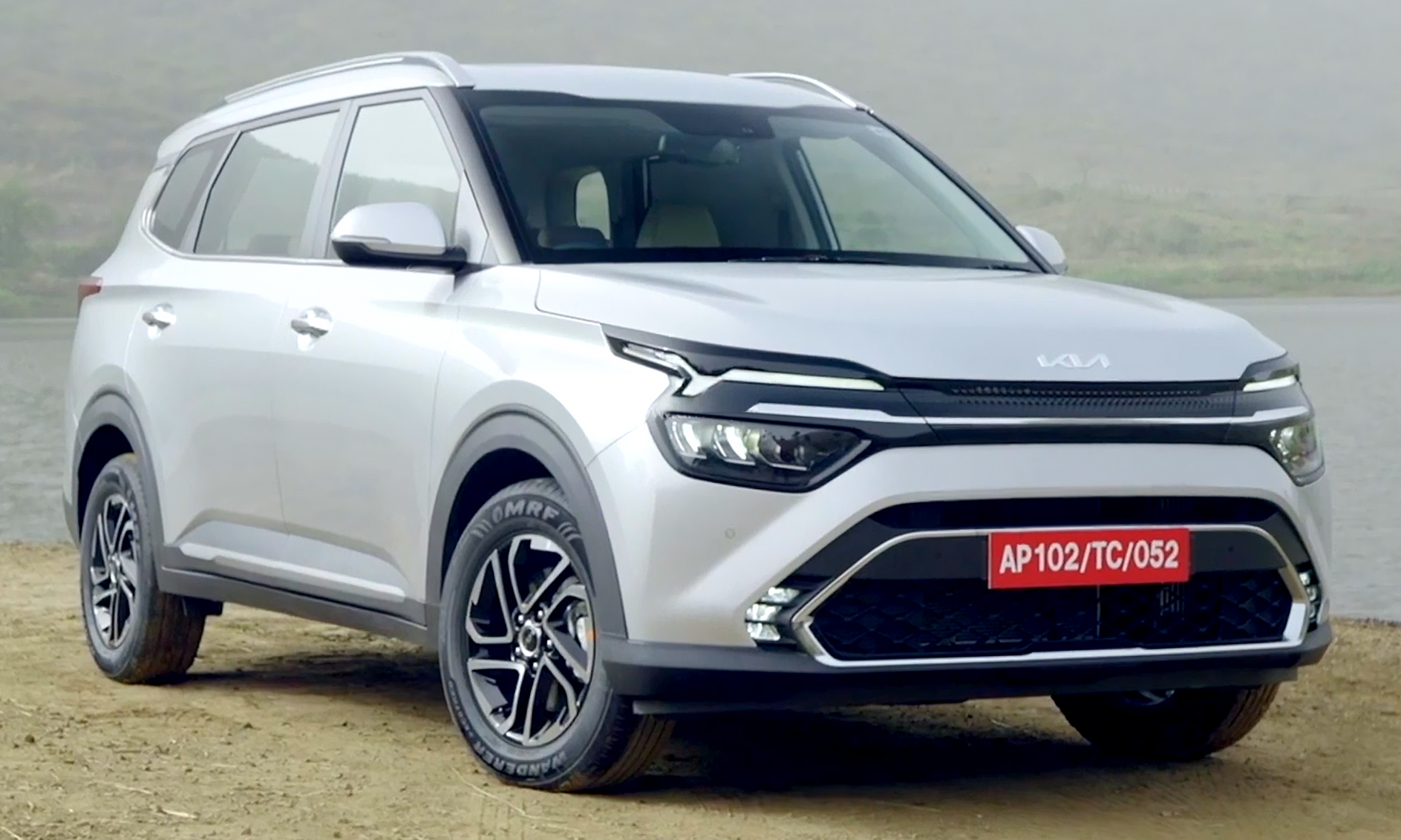
Kia Carens (KY)

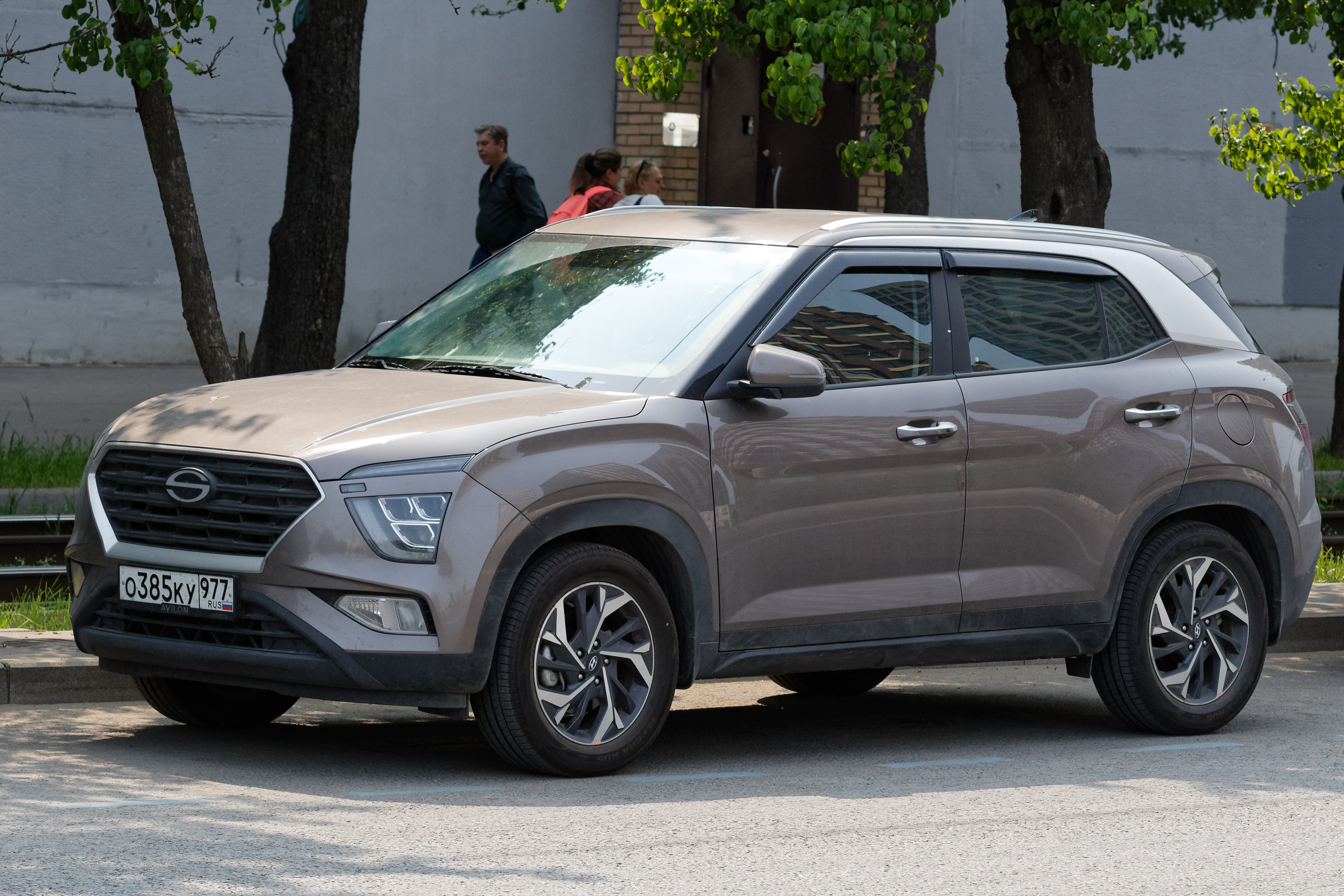
Hyundai Creta (SU2)

== K1/K2-P3 (KP3) platform ==
Introduced in 2015, the K1/K2-P3 platform is mainly utilized for C-segment vehicles. The platform is able to support models with three-row seating. It is serves as a successor to the HD platform.

Vehicles using platform (calendar years):

- Hyundai i30 (PD) (2016–present)
- Hyundai Stargazer (KS) (2022–present)
- Kia Forte (BD) (2018-present)
- Kia Ceed/ProCeed/XCeed (CD) (2018–present)
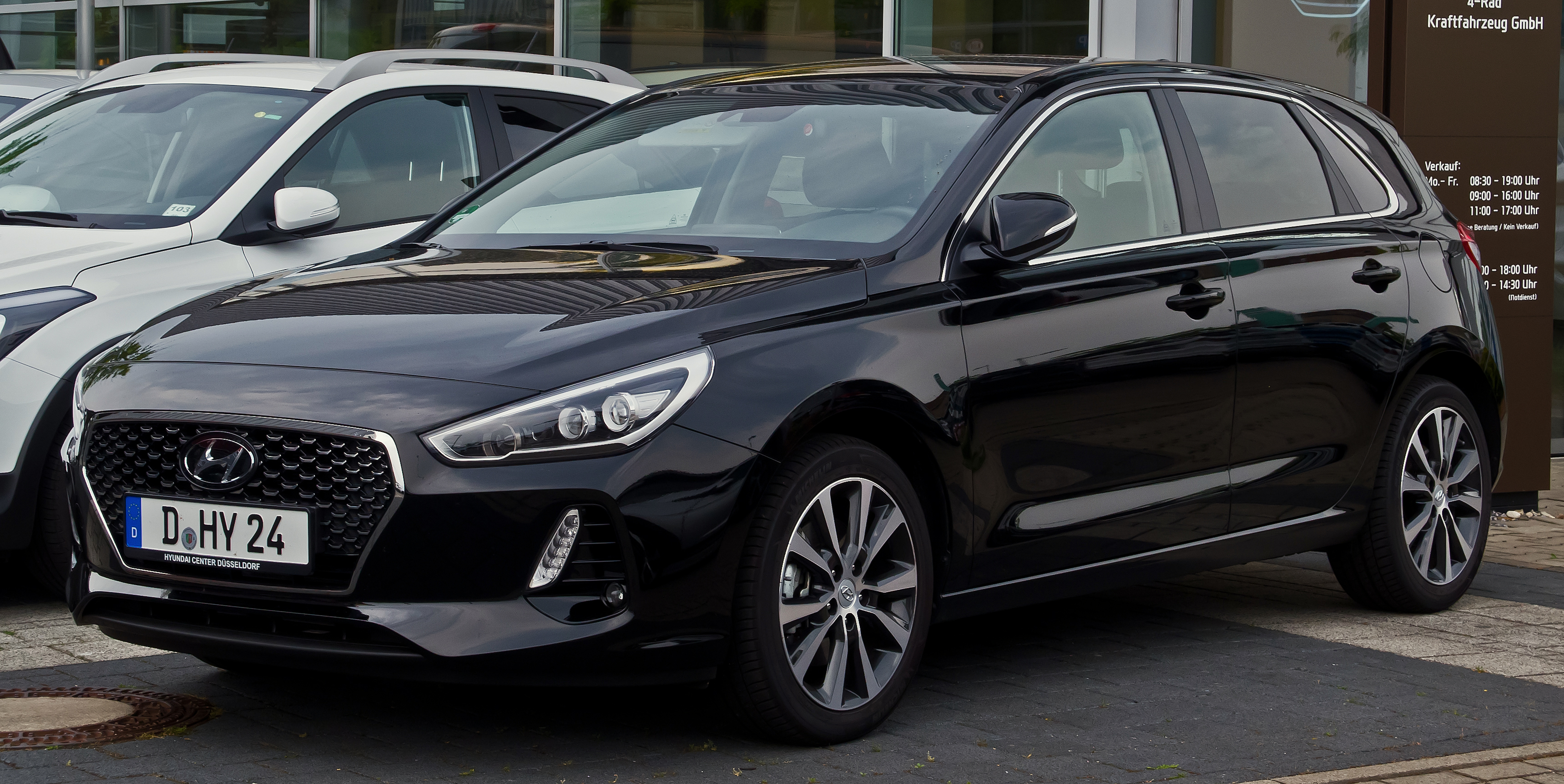
Hyundai i30 (PD)

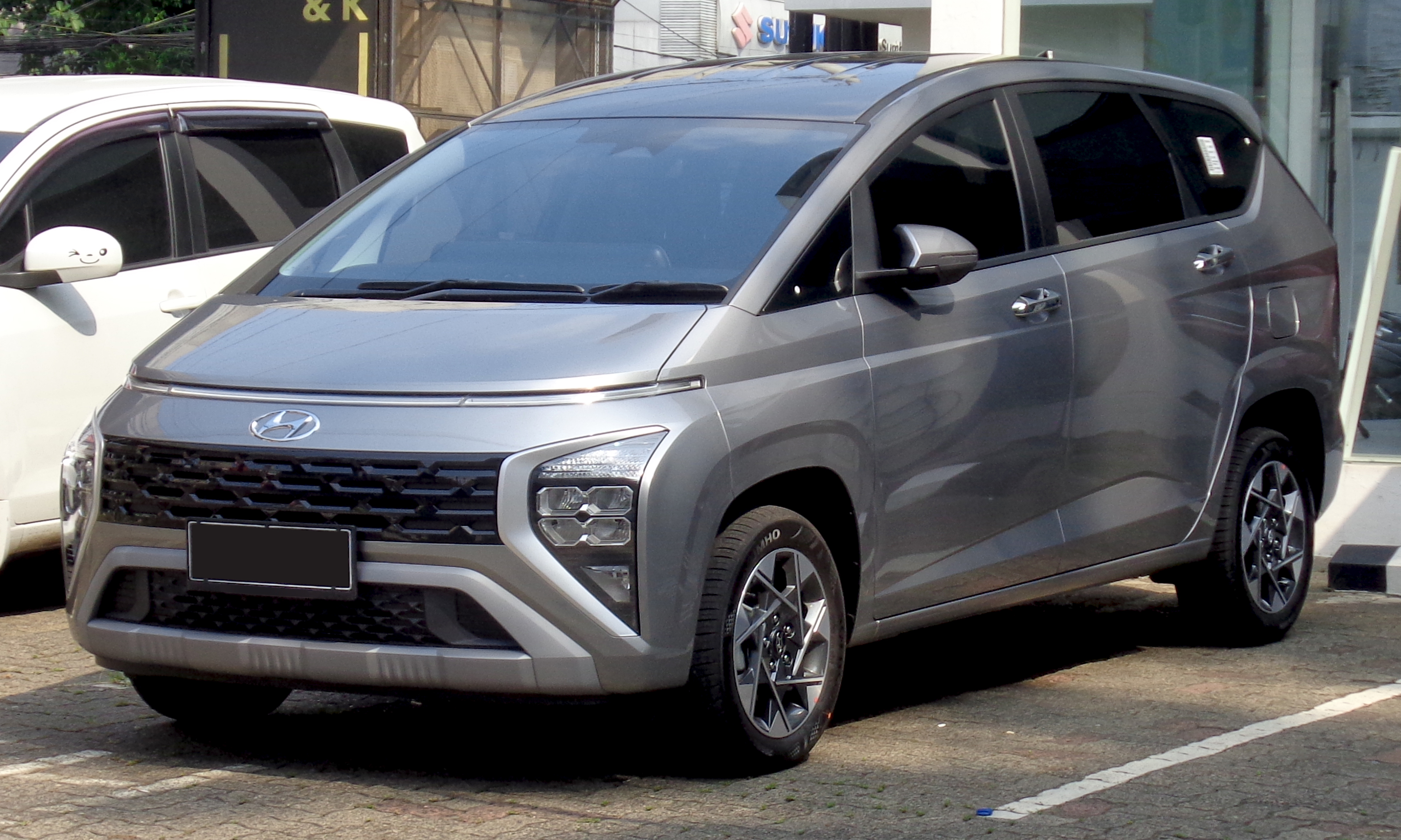
Hyundai Stargazer (KS)

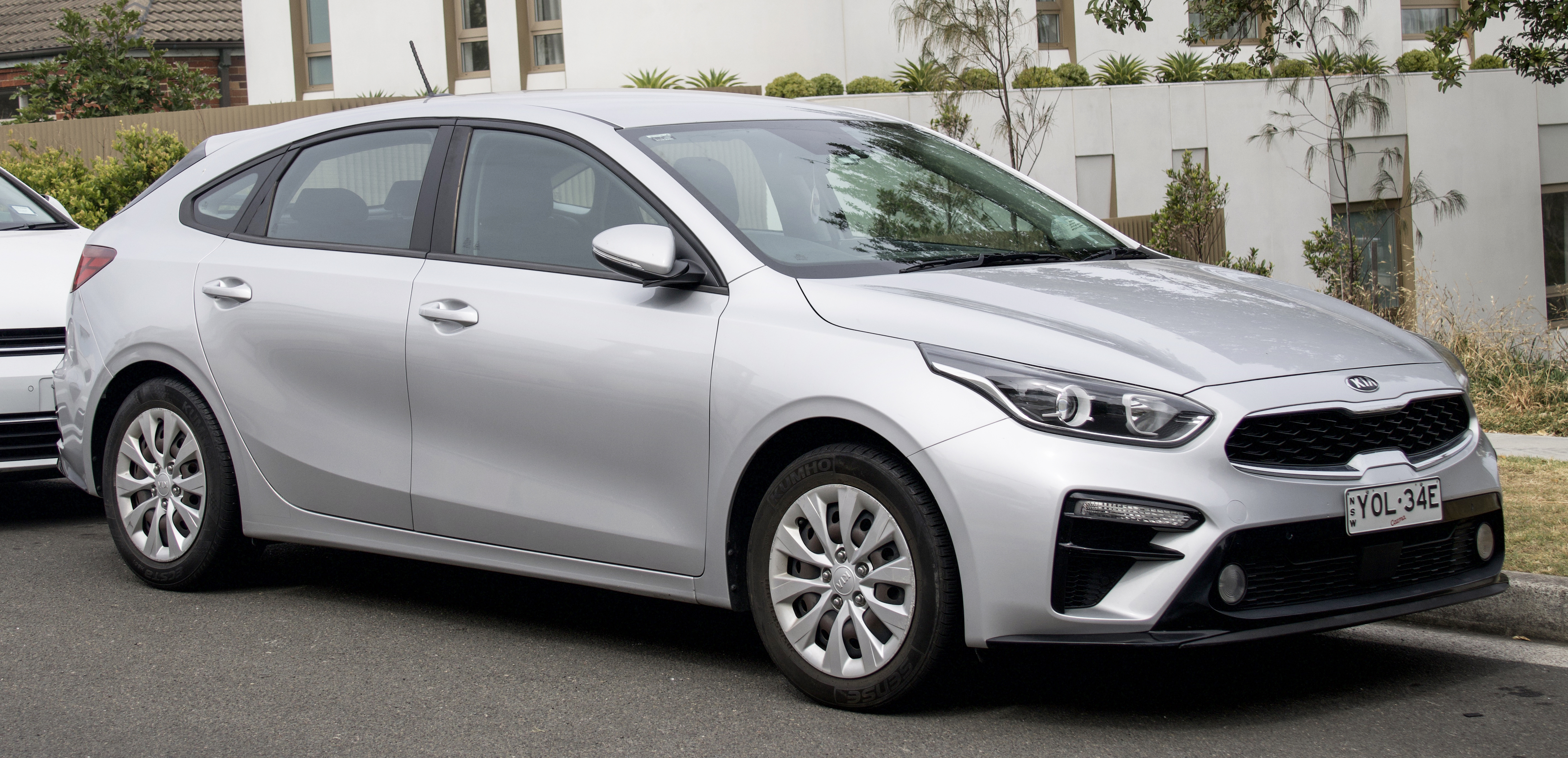

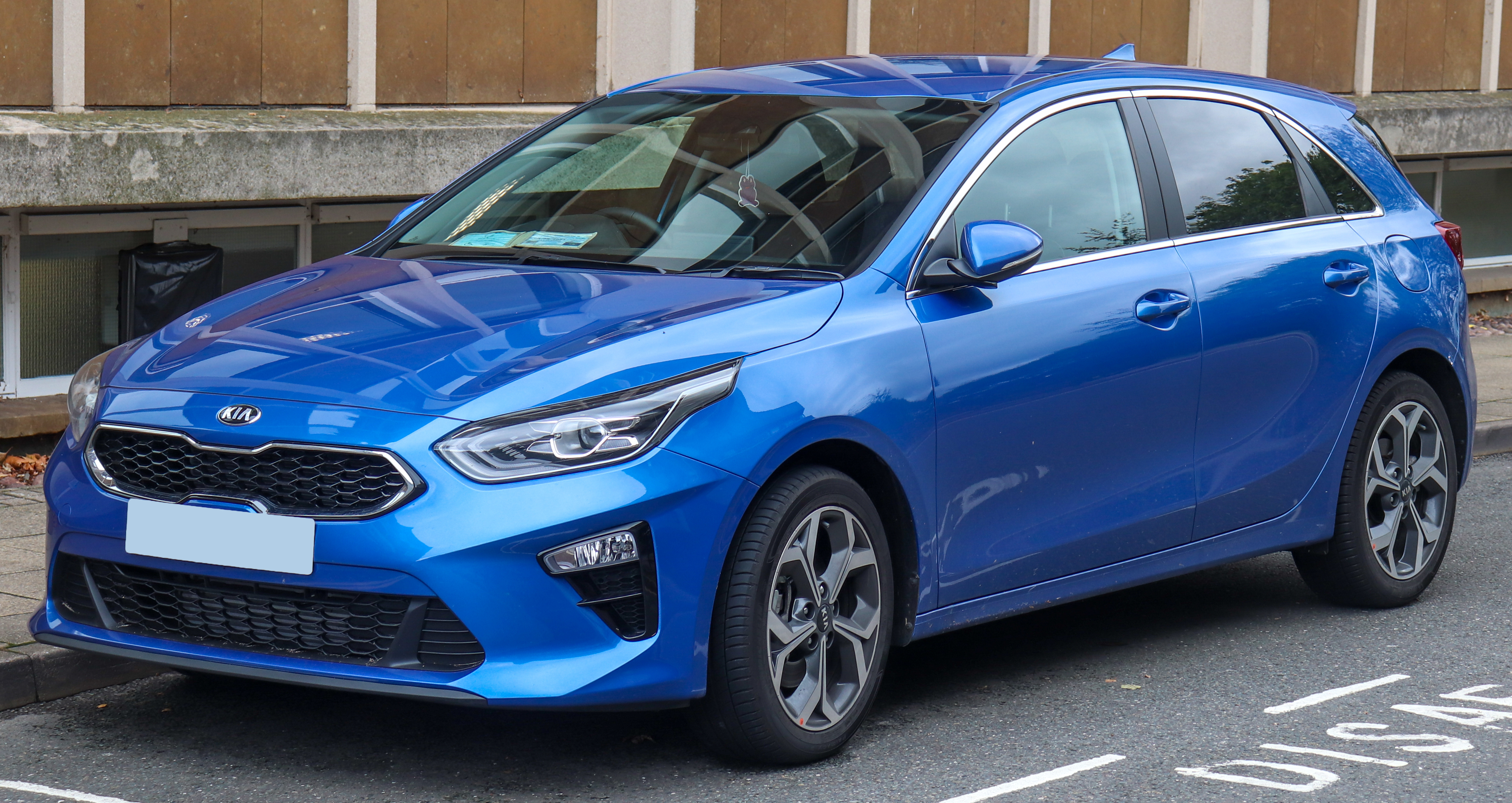
Kia Ceed (CD)

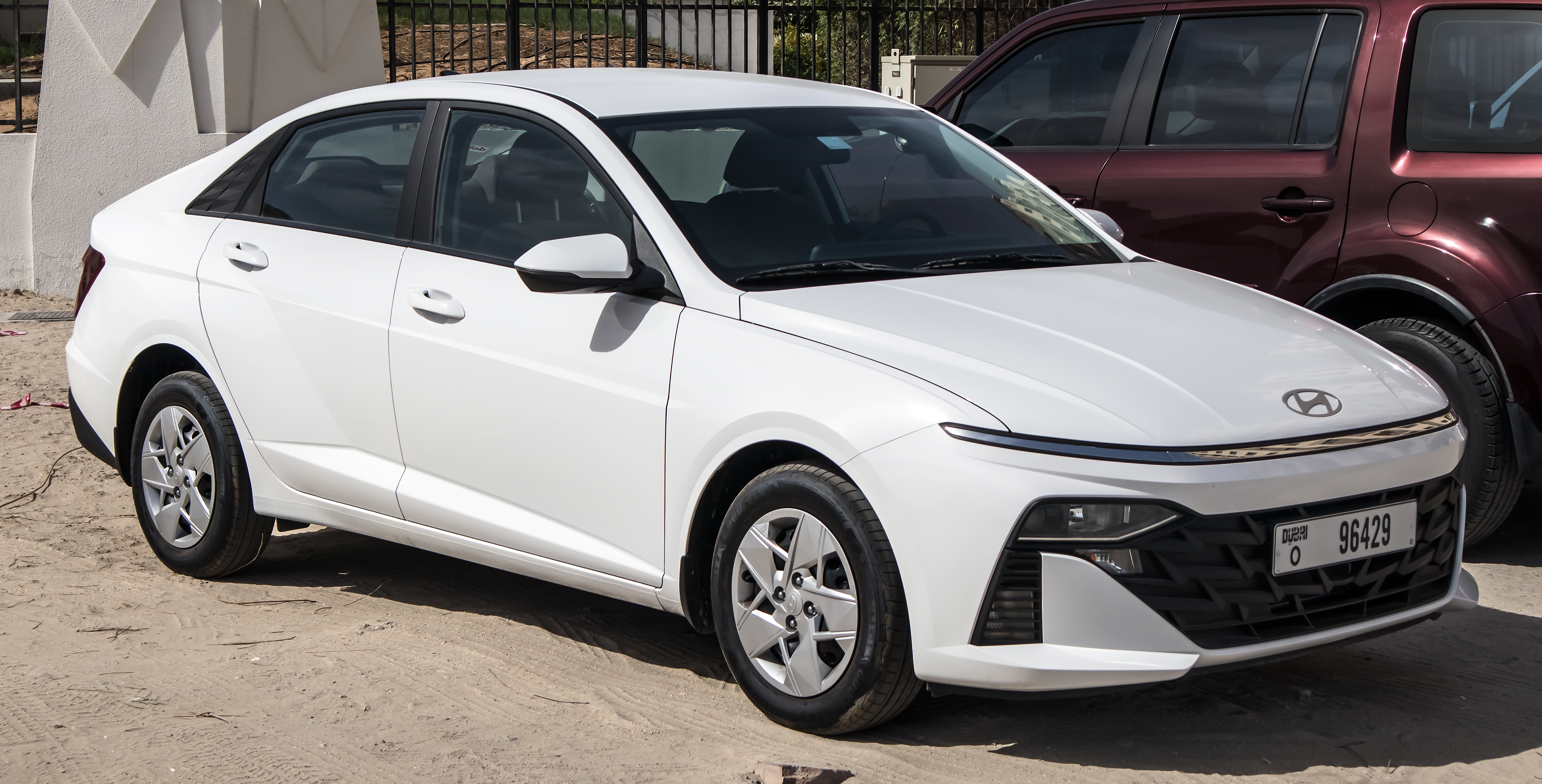
Hyundai Accent (BN7)

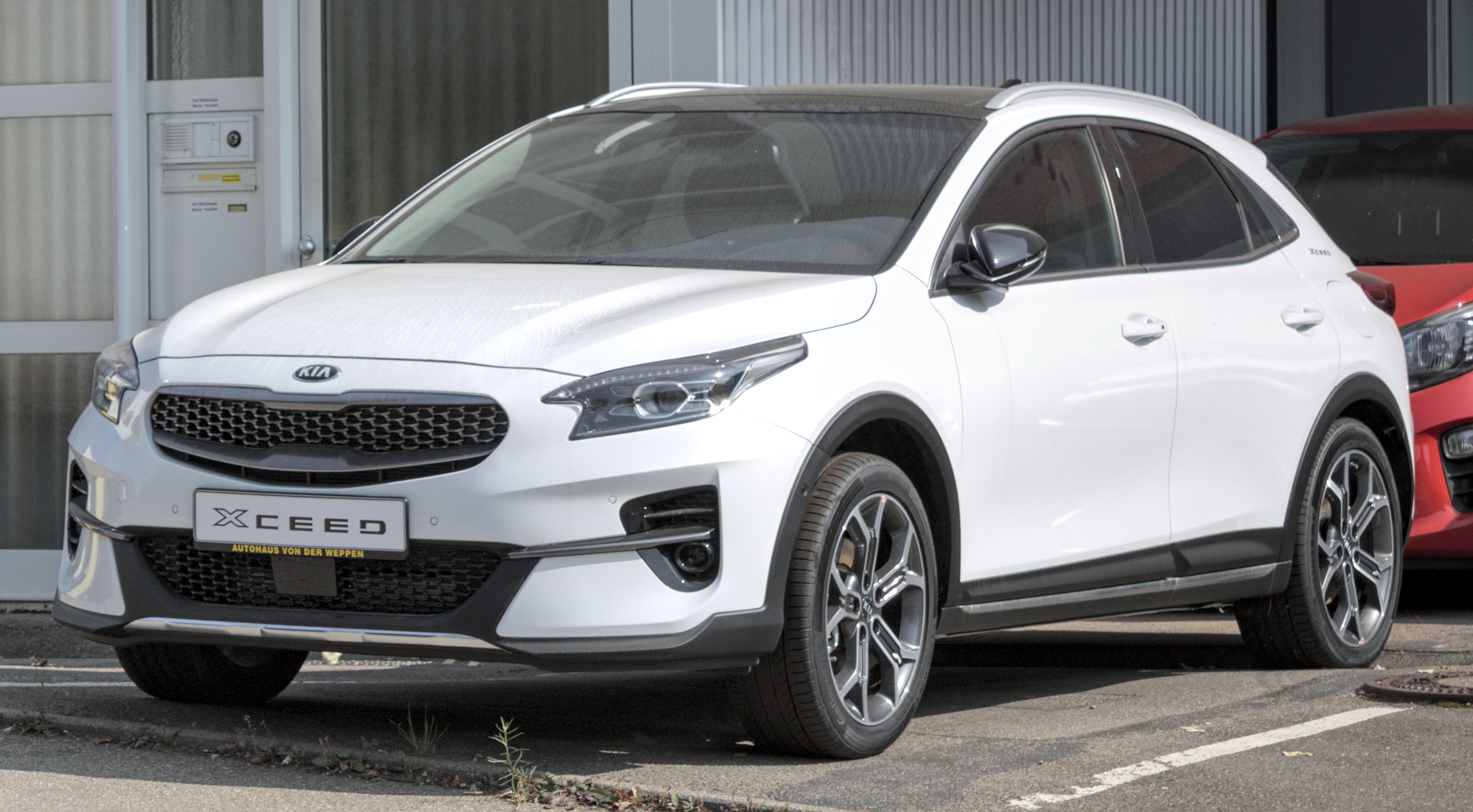
Kia XCeed (CD)

== K2 BEV platform ==
Introduced in 2025, the K2 BEV platform is a dedicated battery electric vehicle platform for the small-segment of Hyundai E-GMP derived from the K2 platform.

- Hyundai Creta Electric (2025–present)
- Kia Carens Clavis EV / Hyundai Neira (2025–present)
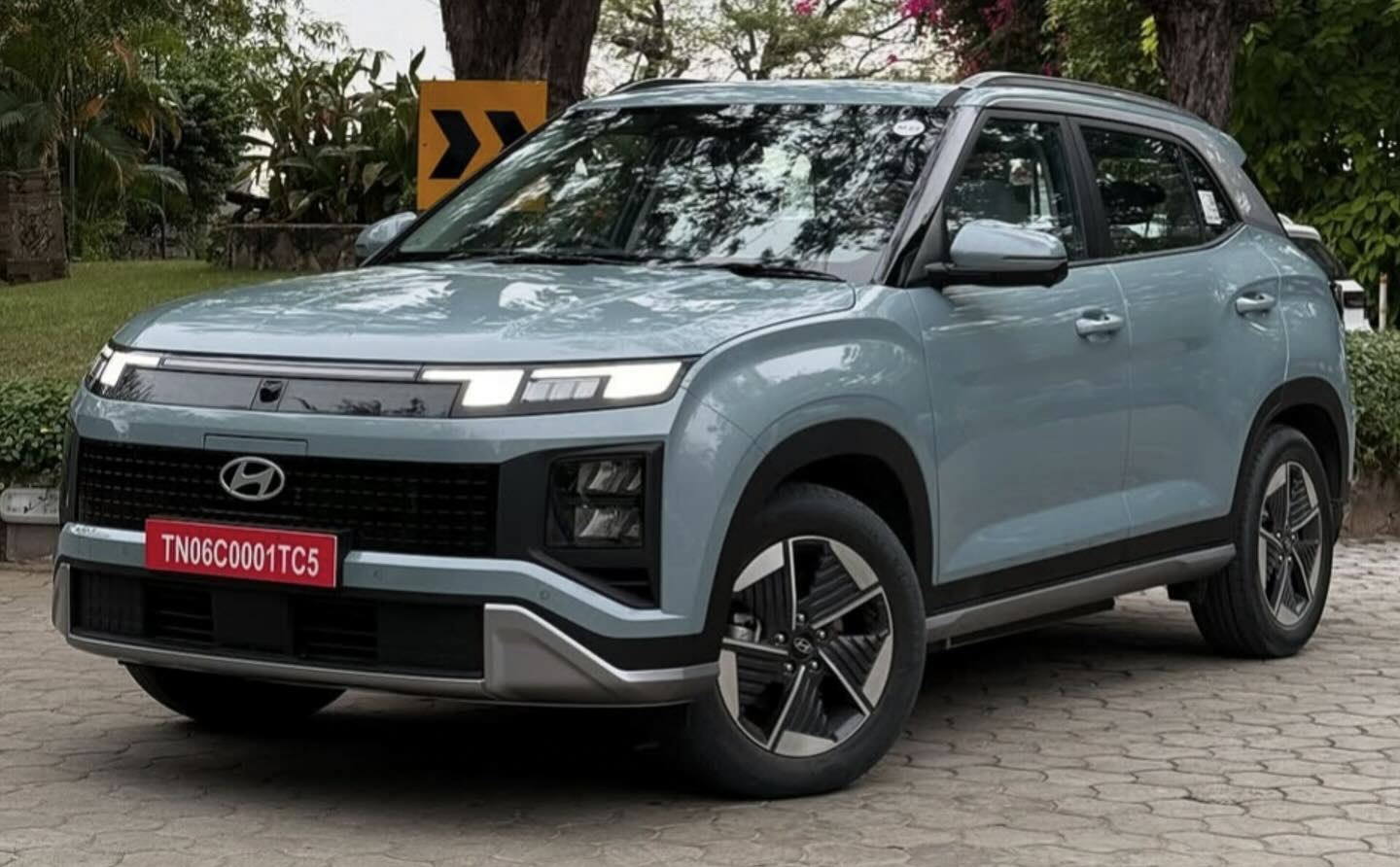
Hyundai Creta Electric

== K3/K4-P2 platform ==
Introduced in 2020, the K3/K4-P2 platform is an all-new platform for C-segment vehicles as the successor to J platform series. Dubbed as the third-generation platform, Hyundai claimed the platform allowed engineers to lower the center of gravity for more agile handling. The platform also improves safety due to the usage of a multiload path structure.

- Hyundai Accent/Verna (BN7) (2020–present)
- Hyundai Kona (SX2) (2022–present)
- Hyundai i20 (BC4) (2026–present)
- Hyundai Elantra/Avante/i30 sedan (CN7) (2020–present)
- Kia Niro (SG2) (2021–present)
- Kia K3 (BL7) (2023–present)
- Kia K4 (CL4) (2024–present)
- Kia Seltos (SP3) (2026–present)
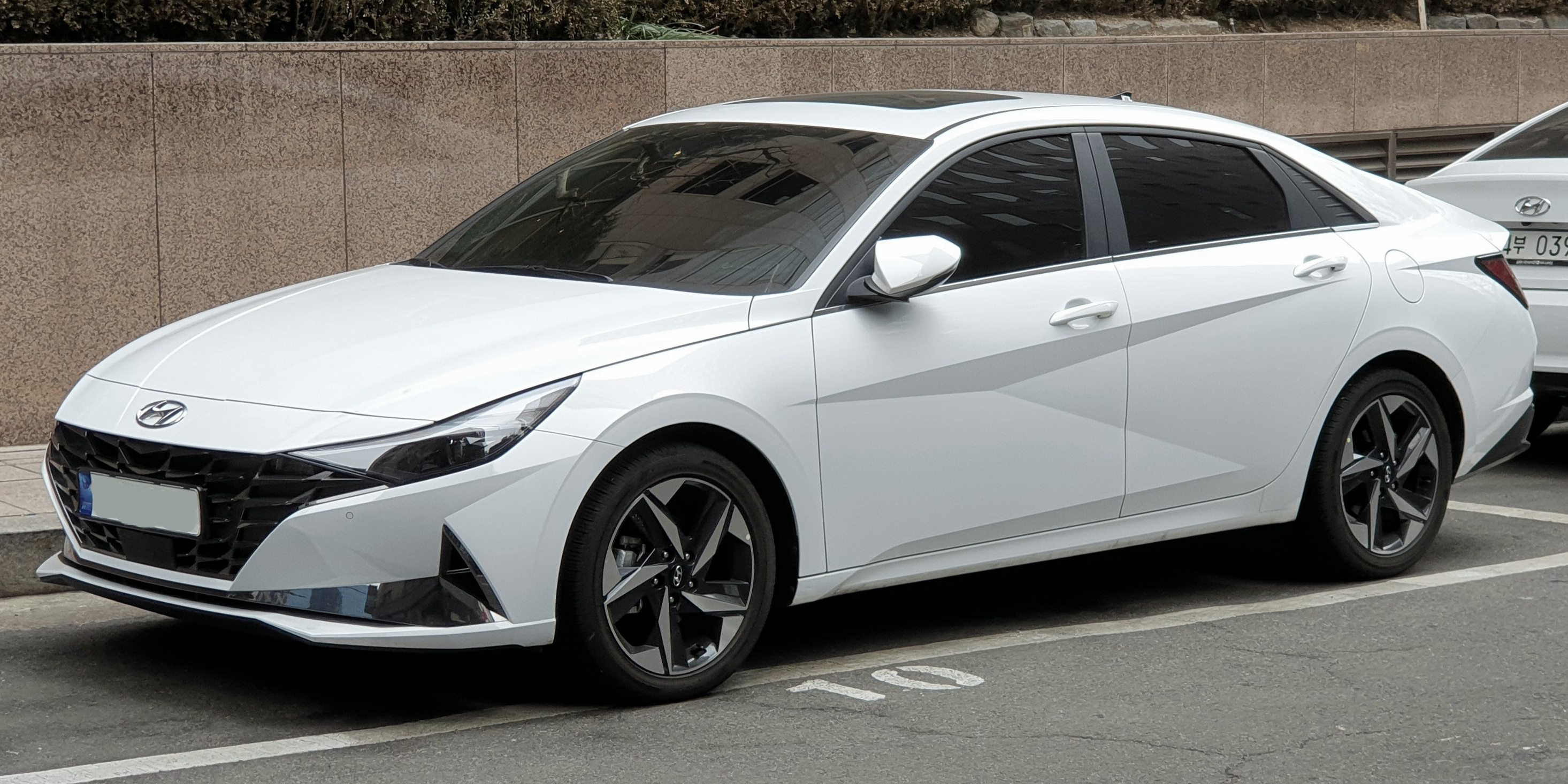
Hyundai Avante (CN7)

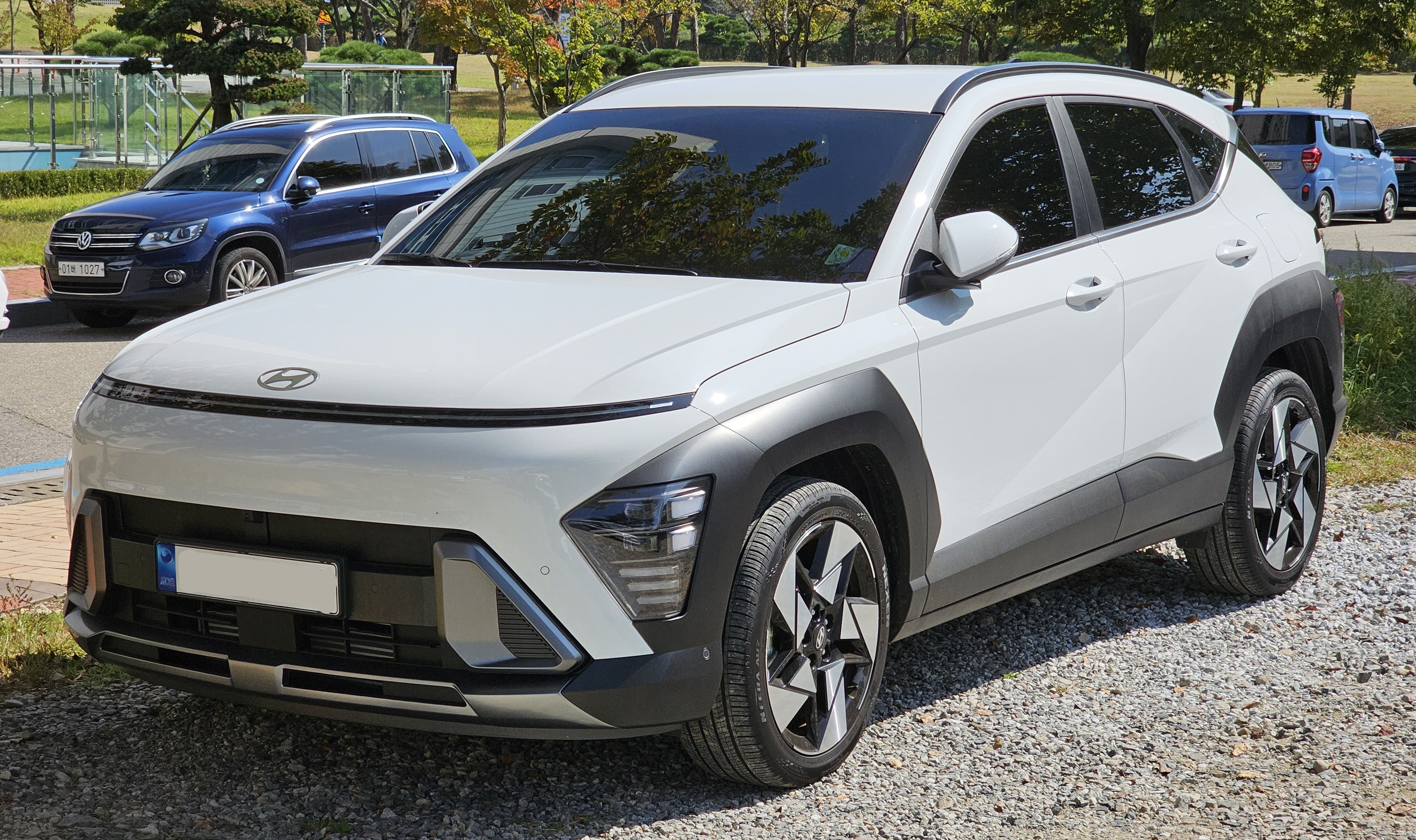
Hyundai Kona (SX2)

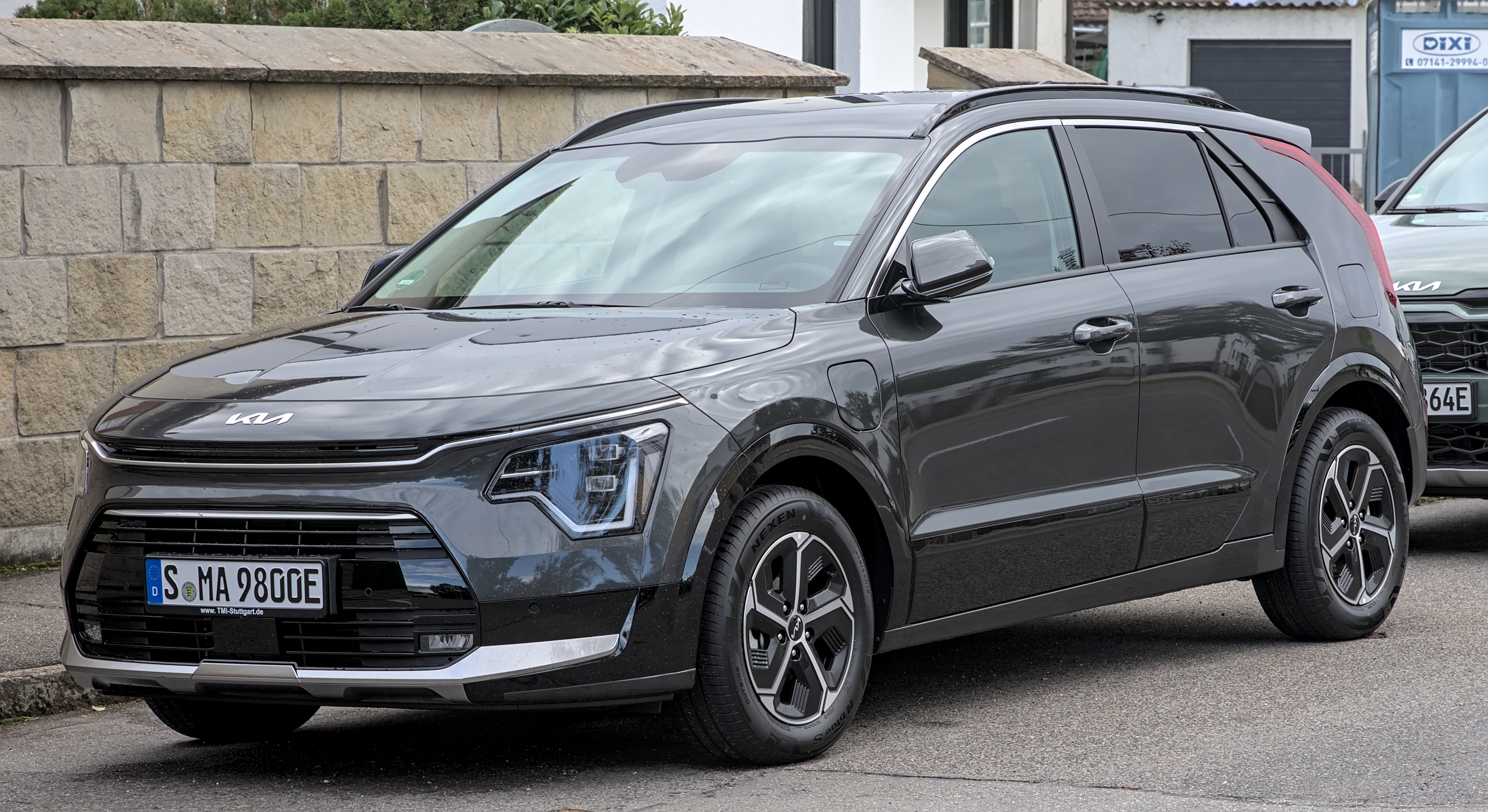
Kia Niro (SG2)

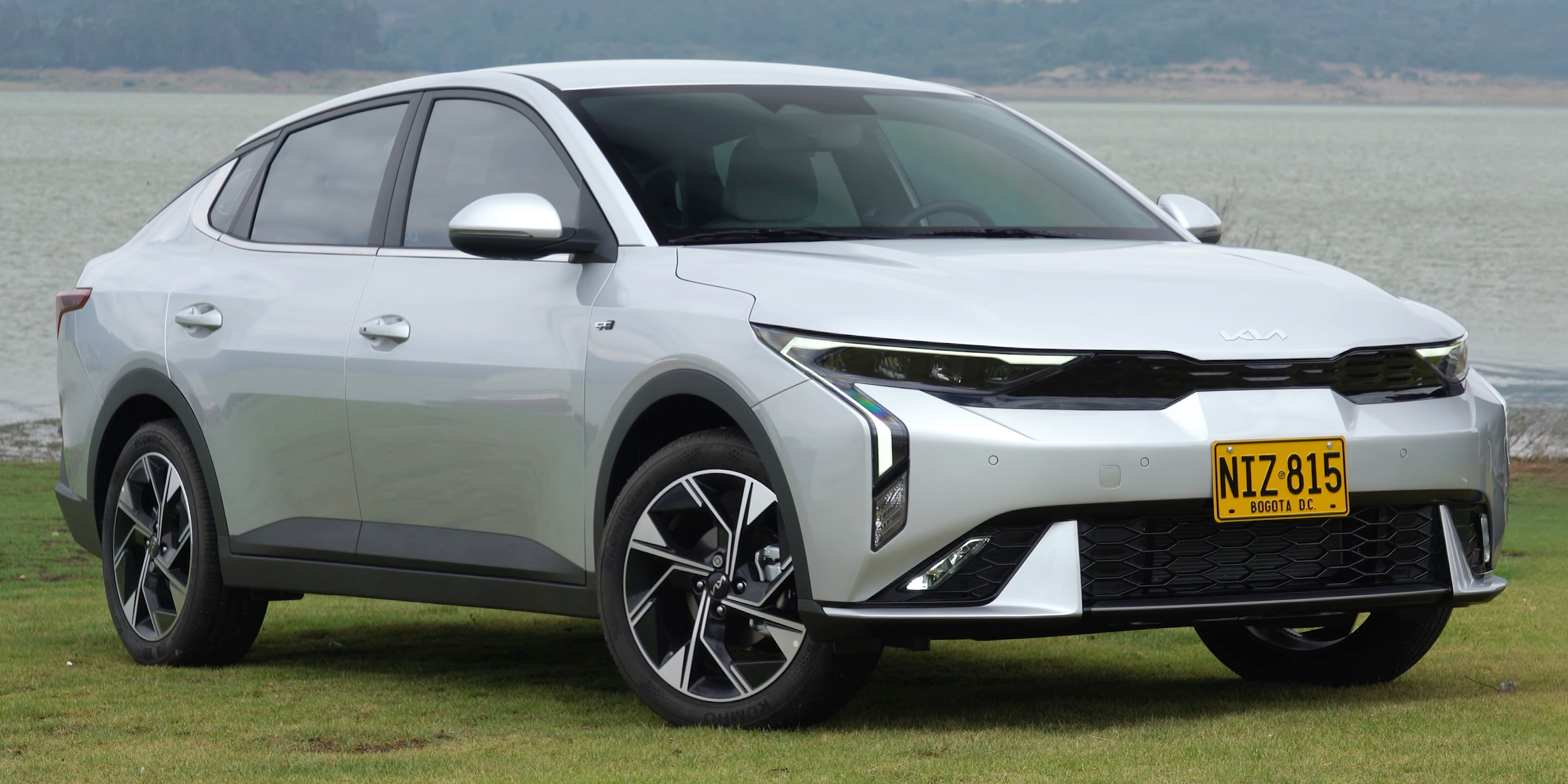
Kia K3 (BL7)

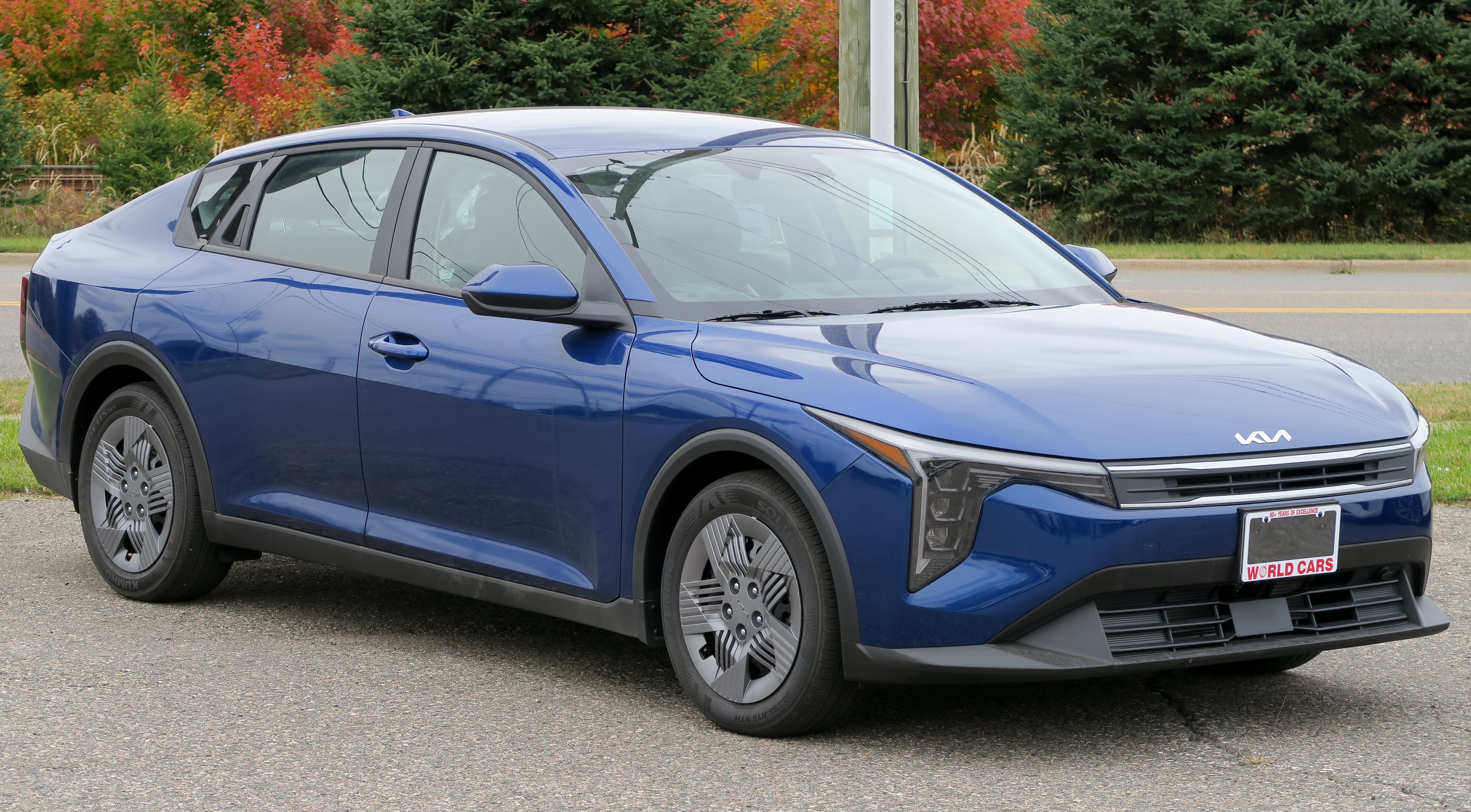
Kia K4 (CL4)

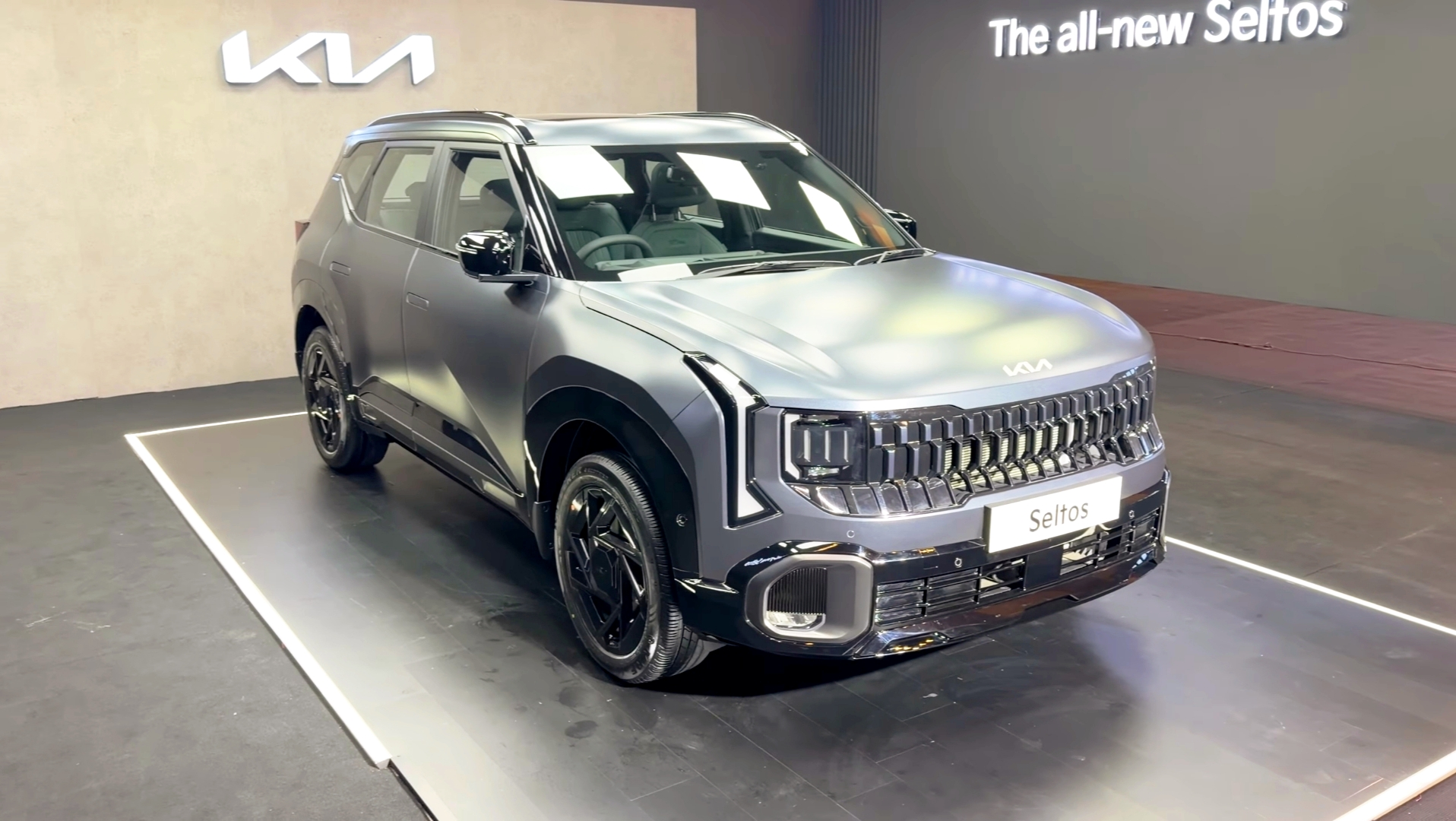
Kia Seltos (SP3)

== K3 BEV platform ==
Introduced in 2024, the K3 BEV platform is a dedicated battery electric vehicle platform for the small-segment of Hyundai E-GMP derived from the K3 platform.

- Kia EV3 (SV) (2024–present)
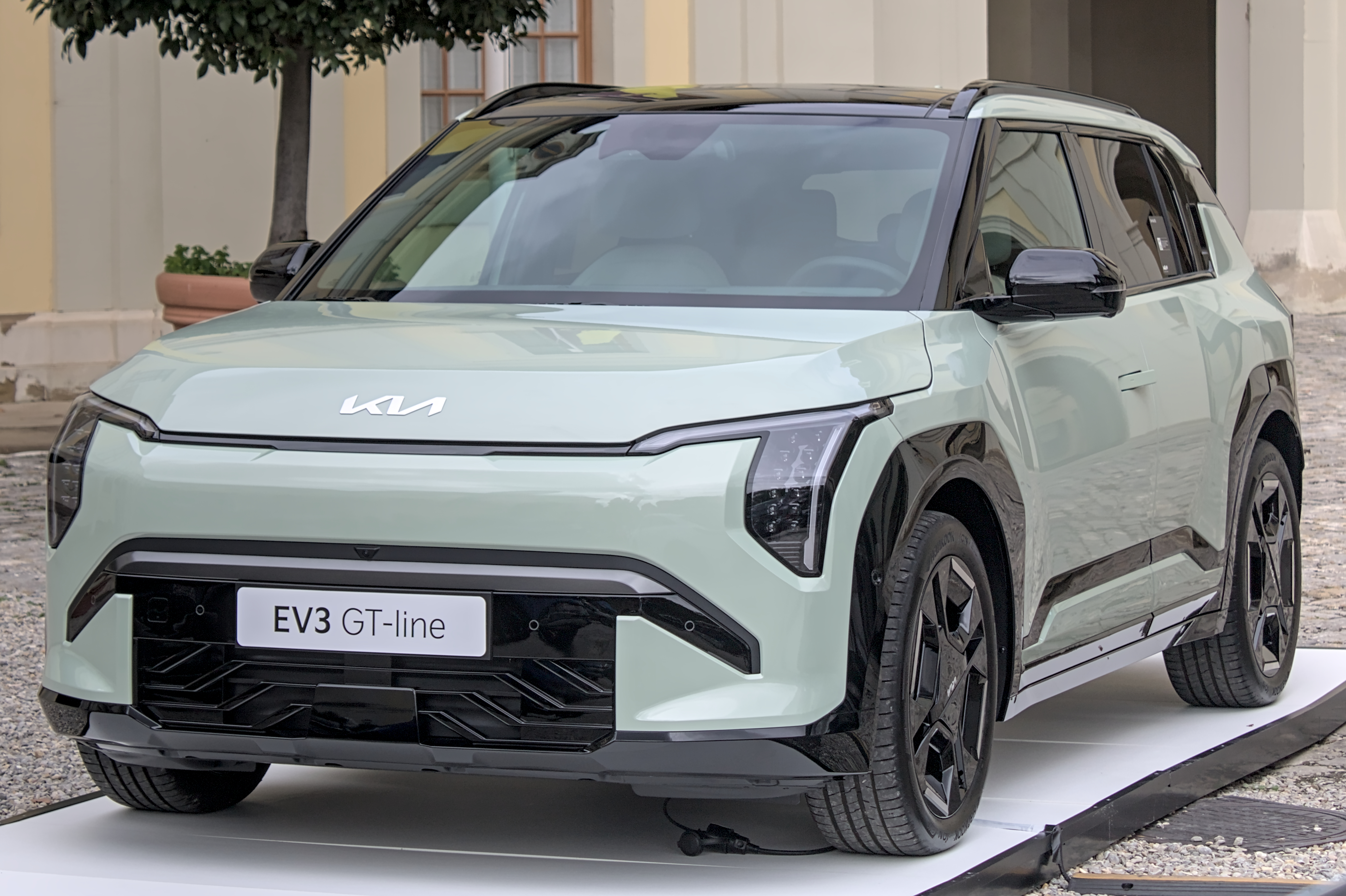
Kia EV3 (SV)
