= Kia Syros =

Crossover city car produced by Kia

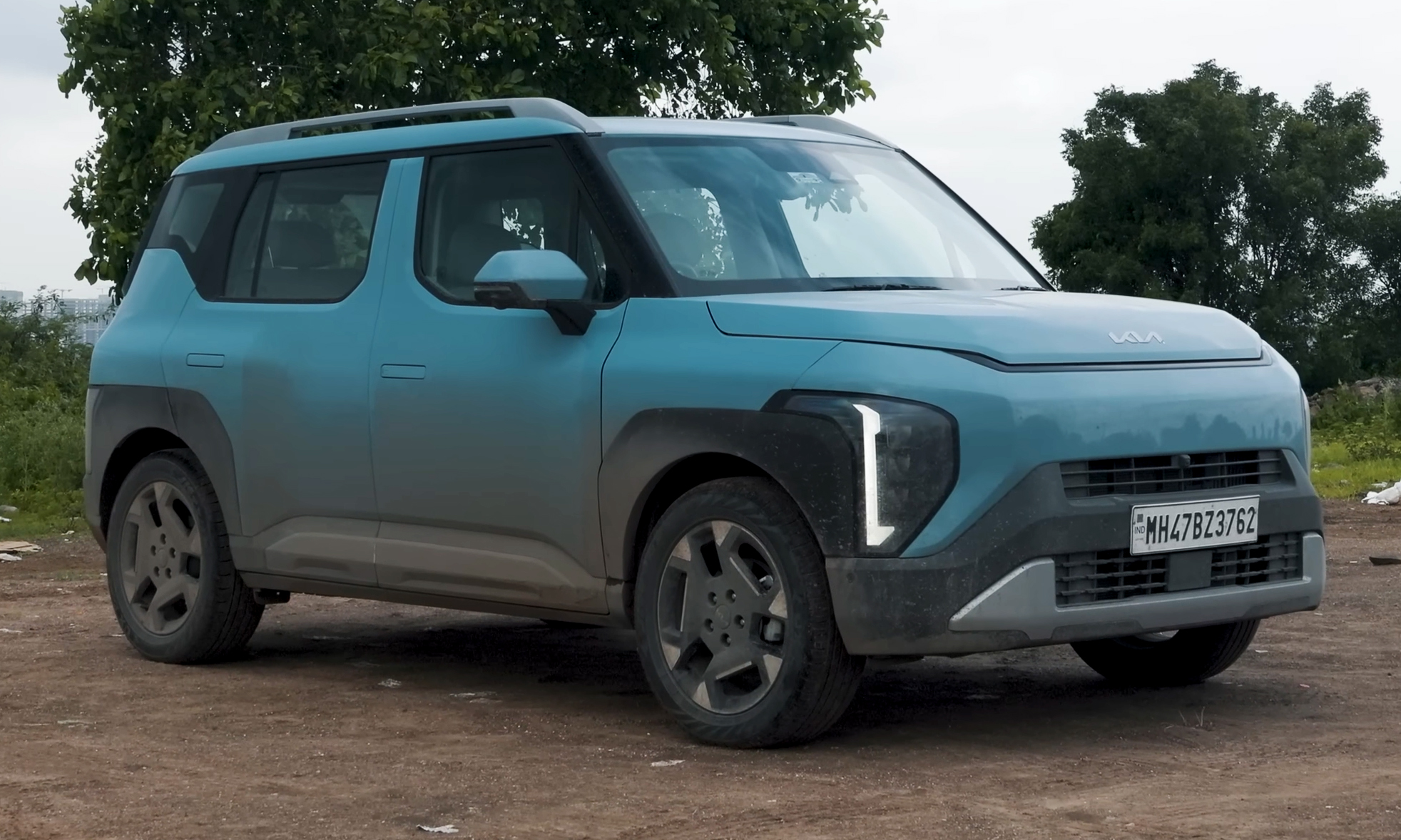

Overview
- Manufacturer: Kia
- Model code: AY
- Production: January 2025 – present; July 2026 – present (Syros EV)
- Assembly: India: Anantapur, Andhra Pradesh (Kia India)
- Designer: Under the lead of Teck-koun Kim

Body and chassis
- Class: Crossover city car (A)
- Body style: 5-door hatchback
- Layout: Front-engine, front-wheel-drive
- Platform: Hyundai-Kia K1; Hyundai-Kia K1 BEV (Syros EV)
- Related: Hyundai Venue (QU2)

Powertrain
- Engine: Petrol: 1.0 L Smartstream G1.0T-GDi; Diesel: 1.5 L Smartstream D1.5 CRDi VGT
- Transmission: 6-speed manual; 6-speed automatic; 7-speed DCT
- Battery: 42 kWh LGES NMC lithium-ion (Syros EV); 51.4 kWh LGES NMC lithium-ion (Syros EV)

Dimensions
- Wheelbase: 2,550 mm (100 in)
- Length: 3,995 mm (157.3 in)
- Width: 1,790–1,805 mm (70.5–71.1 in)
- Height: 1,625–1,680 mm (64.0–66.1 in)

The Kia Syros is an (A-segment) crossover city car manufactured by the South Korean automaker Kia since 2025.

Developed and produced in India, it is smallest crossover from Kia's global lineup (except for the Indian market).

The name Syros is derived from the Greek island of the same name.

== World premiere ==
=== Reveal ===
The Syros was first unveiled in India on 19 December 2024 ahead of its launch in the Indian market, and bookings opened a year later on 3 January 2025.

=== Position ===
In the Indian market, the Syros is positioned between the Sonet and the Seltos in Kia's local lineup.

== Production ==
The Syros is produced at the Kia India plant in Anantapur, Andhra Pradesh, alongside the Seltos, Sonet, and fourth-generation Carens.

Production commenced on 16 January 2025.

== Overview ==
=== Exterior ===
The Syros features a boxy shape inspired by the Soul, with some styling cues drawn from the EV5 and EV9. The headlamps are vertically oriented, and the rear lamps use an L-shaped design, with the brake lights positioned at the bottom of the rear bumper. Roof rails are fitted depending on the grade.

=== Interior ===
The interior features dual 12.3-inch displays for the digital instrument cluster and touchscreen infotainment, along with a Level 2 advanced driver assistance system (ADAS) offering 16 autonomous functions, including smart cruise control and lane-keeping assist. It also features a 360-degree surround-view camera and a blind-spot monitor. Additional equipment includes an 8-speaker Harman Kardon audio setup, ventilated front and rear seats, an optional panoramic sunroof, and 60/40 split-folding rear seats with sliding and reclining adjustment.

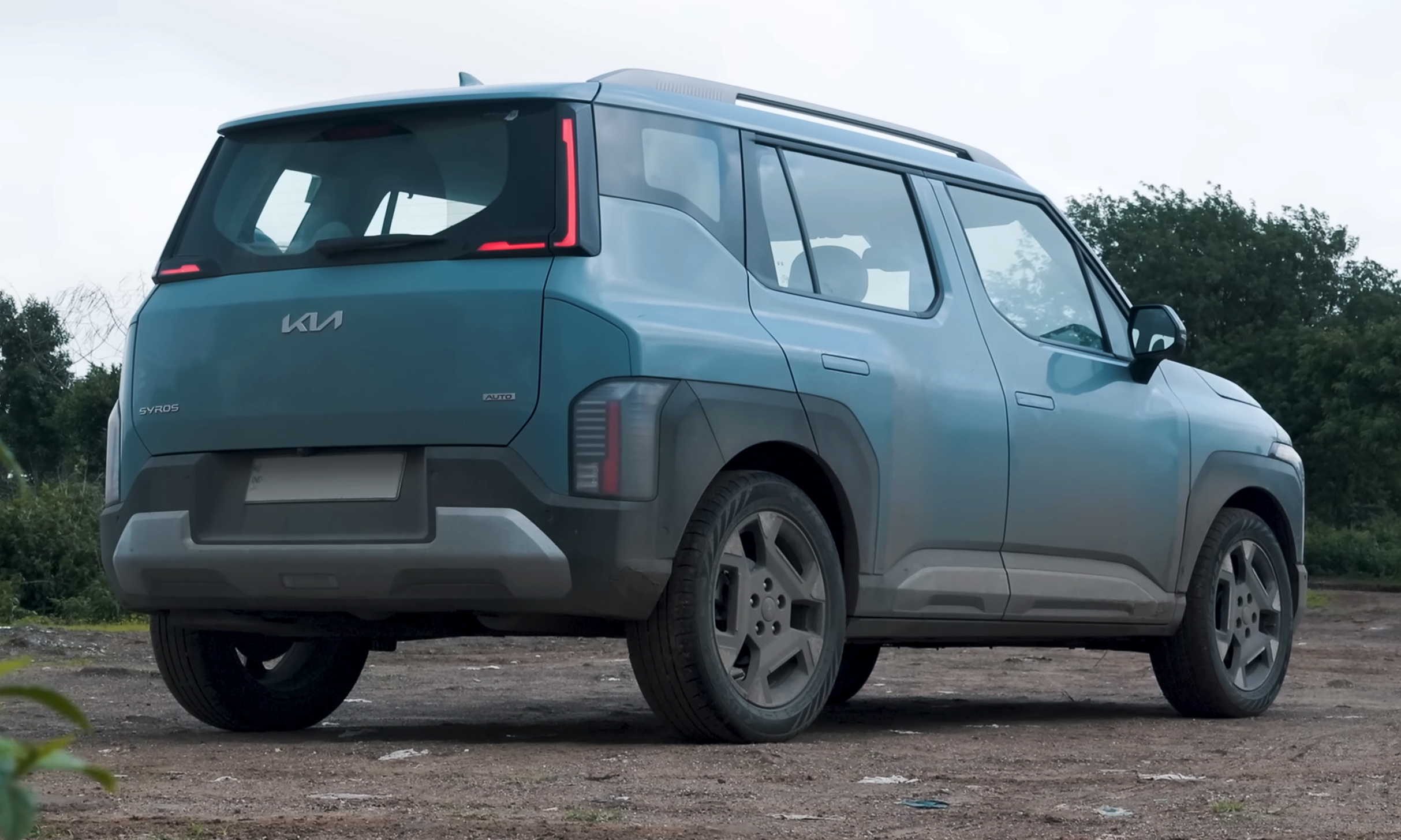
Rear view

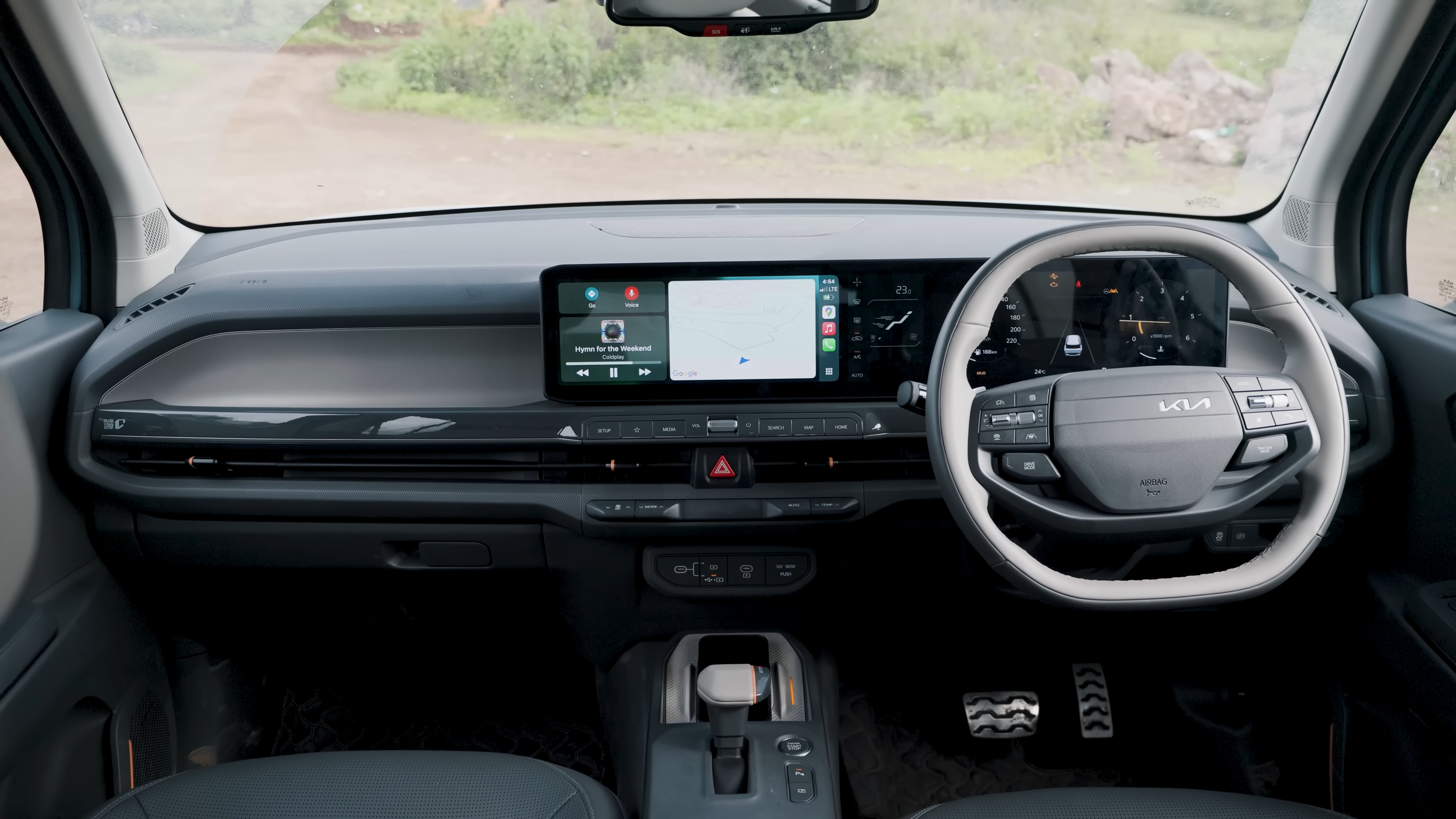
Interior

=== Grade levels ===
The Syros is offered in six grade levels: HTE, HTE(O), HTK(EX), HTK+, HTX, and HTX(O).

== Powertrain specs ==
=== Platform ===
Unlike the Hyundai Casper and Exter, the Kia Syros is based on a "reinforced" K1 platform, which is strengthened with additional hot-stamped parts in the body shell.

It is the first model from the K1 platform family to be fitted with a 1.5-litre diesel engine before the second-generation Hyundai Venue, which was later launched in the final quarter of 2025.

=== Architecture equipment ===
The Syros is equipped with a newly developed electrical and electronic (E/E) architecture with a central data hub that routes data between different ECUs or modules, enabling external communications through an embedded SIM (eSIM) in the vehicle telematics control unit (TCU) for enabling cloud-based services, including over-the-air (OTA) update capabilities.

=== Engines ===
The Syros is offered with a choice of petrol or diesel engines. The petrol option is a 1.0-litre Smartstream turbocharged unit, and the diesel option is a 1.5-litre Smartstream unit. Both engines are mated to either a 6-speed manual, 6-speed automatic, or 7-speed dual-clutch transmission.

Petrol engines
| Model | Engine | Power | Torque | Transmissions |
|---|---|---|---|---|
| 1.0 L G3LC T-GDi | 998 cc (60.9 cu in) turbocharged I3 | 120 PS (88 kW; 118 hp) @ 6,000 rpm | 172 N⋅m (17.5 kg⋅m; 127 lb⋅ft) @ 1,500–4,000 rpm | 6-speed manual 7-speed DCT |
Diesel engines
| Model | Engine | Power | Torque | Transmissions |
| 1.5 L D4FA Smartstream D1.5 CRDi VGT | 1,493 cc (91.1 cu in) turbocharged I4 | 115 PS (85 kW; 113 hp) @ 4,000 rpm | 250 N⋅m (25.5 kg⋅m; 184 lb⋅ft) @ 1,500–2,750 rpm | 6-speed manual 6-speed automatic |

== 2026 update ==
=== Facelift ===
On 22 April 2026, the Syros received a facelift, featuring revised front and rear fascias, new alloy wheel designs, four additional trim levels, and three new exterior colours.

=== Syros EV ===
A battery electric variant called the Kia Syros EV was launched on 22 July 2026.

It is based on the facelifted model and uses the Hyundai-Kia K1 BEV platform, similar to the Hyundai Inster.

The Syros EV is offered in Standard Range form with a 42 kWh battery, and Extended Range form with a 51.4 kWh battery offering a claimed ARAI-certified range of up to 526 km (327 mi). Both batteries are nickel manganese cobalt produced by LG Energy Solution. The Syros EV carries over the Level 2 ADAS suite from the combustion-engined model and adds a 30-inch "Trinity" display spanning the instrument cluster and infotainment system.

It is available with a Battery-as-a-Service (BaaS) financing option and a lifetime high-voltage battery warranty covering 15 years with unlimited kilometres for the first owner.

== Safety ==
The Syros became the first Kia model in India to receive a five-star rating for both adult and child occupant protection under Bharat NCAP, whose protocol is based on the 2016 Latin NCAP standard.

Bharat NCAP test results Kia Syros (2025, based on Latin NCAP 2016)
| Test | Score | Stars |
|---|---|---|
| Adult occupant protection | 30.21/32.00 | 5 /5 stars |
| Child occupant protection | 44.42/49.00 | 5 /5 stars |
