= Kia Seltos =

Korean crossover SUV

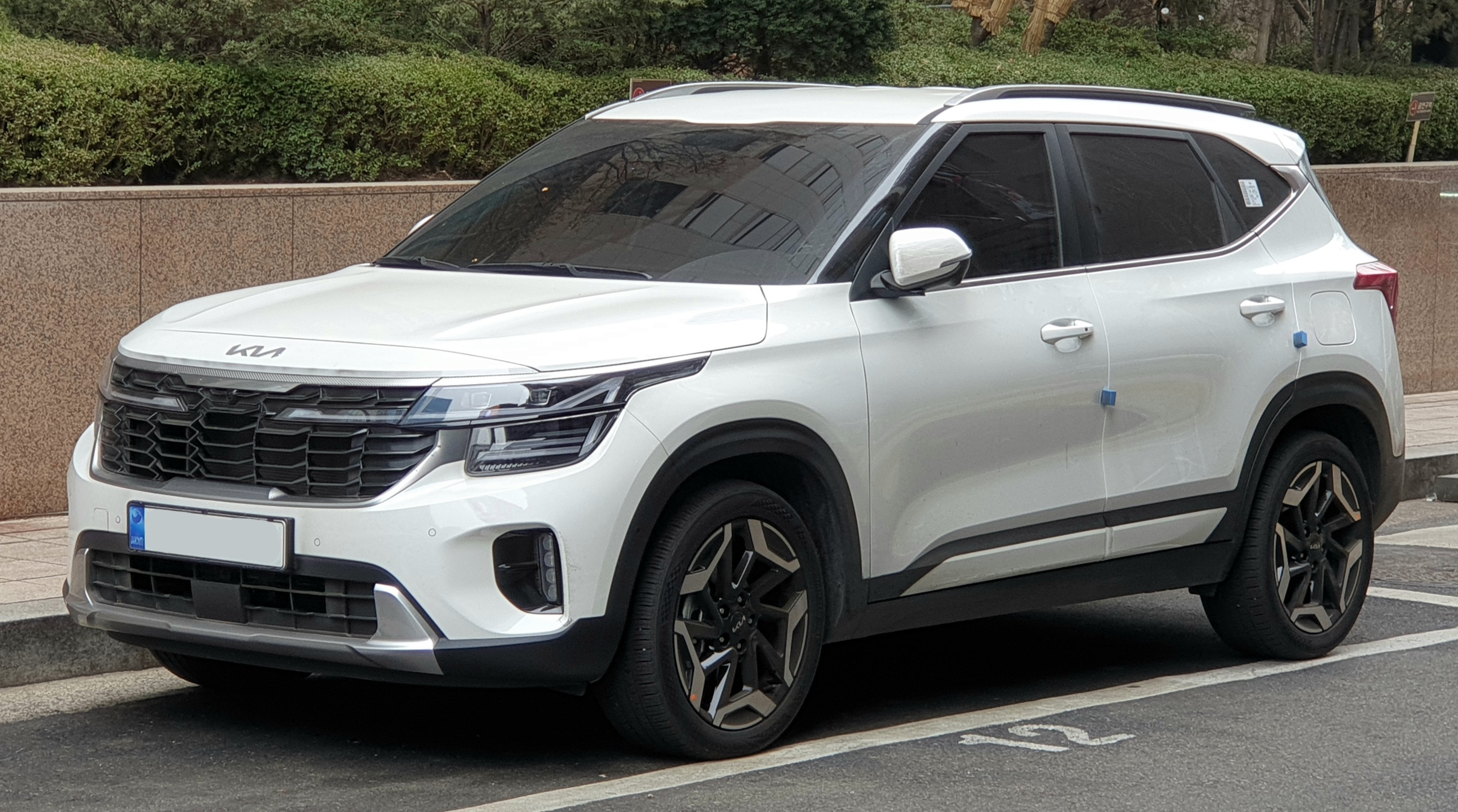
- Kia Seltos (SP2)

Overview
- Manufacturer: Kia
- Also called: Kia KX3 (China, 2019–2023)
- Production: 2019−present
- Model years: 2021−present (North America)

Body and chassis
- Class: Subcompact crossover SUV (B) (2019–present); Compact crossover SUV (C) (2026–present)
- Body style: 5-door SUV

The Kia Seltos (Korean: 기아 셀토스) is a crossover SUV manufactured by Kia since 2019.

It is positioned between the smaller Stonic, Soul, or Sonet and the larger Sportage in Kia's global SUV lineup.

The first-generation Seltos is designated as a global product with three variations introduced for different markets. The first variation is the largest version of the Seltos, which is manufactured in South Korea (codename: SP2) mainly aimed at developed markets, including North America and Australasia. The two other variations are the Indian-made Seltos (codename: SP2i) and the closely related Chinese version badged as the Kia KX3 (codename: SP2c). The SP2i and SP2c models are the low-cost versions of the Seltos to penetrate emerging markets, built on the Hyundai-Kia K2 platform and closely related to the second-generation Hyundai Creta/ix25.

The name "Seltos" is derived from "Celtos", the son of Hercules and Celtine in Greek mythology. According to Kia, the Seltos is primarily marketed to millennials.

== First generation (SP2; 2019) ==
First generation
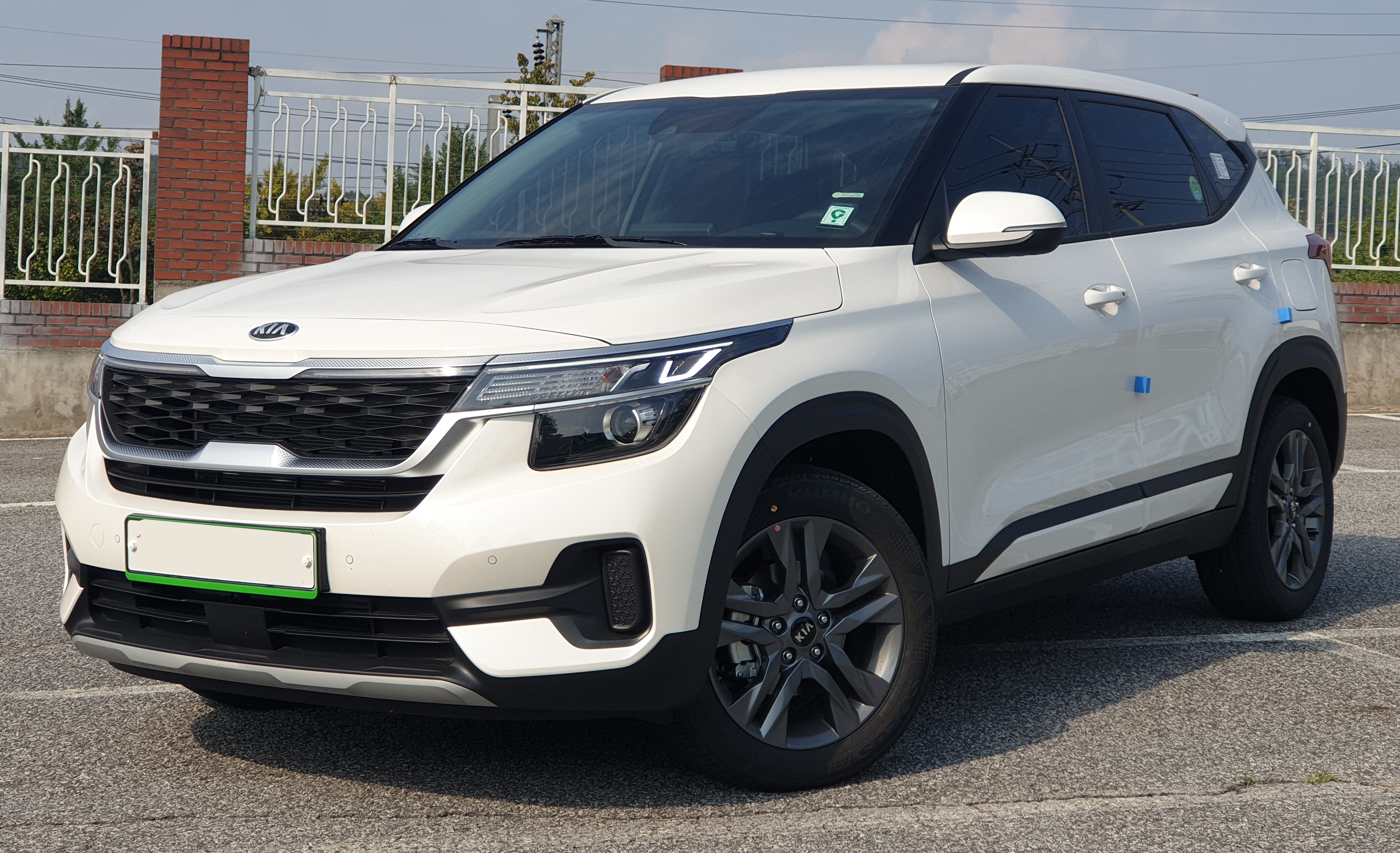
- Kia Seltos (SP2, pre-facelift)

Overview
- Model code: SP2; SP2i; SP2c
- Also called: Kia KX3 (China, 2019–2023)
- Production: 2019–present
- Model years: 2021–2026
- Assembly: South Korea: Gwangju (SP2); India: Anantapur (Kia India) (SP2i); China: Yancheng (Yueda Kia) (SP2c); Russia: Kaliningrad (Avtotor) (SP2); Ecuador: Quito (Aymesa) (SP2i); Vietnam: Chu Lai (THACO Kia) (SP2i); Uzbekistan: Jizzakh (ADM-Jizzakh) (SP2); Bangladesh: Sreepur Upazila, Gazipur (Meghna Group) (SP2i)
- Designer: Hong Seok Choi

Body and chassis
- Class: Subcompact crossover SUV (B)
- Layout: Front-engine, front-wheel-drive; Front-engine, all-wheel-drive (SP2 only)
- Platform: Hyundai-Kia K2 (SP2i/SP2c); Hyundai-Kia B-SUV (SP2)
- Related: SP2 model: Hyundai Kona; Kia Soul (SK3); SP2i/SP2c model: Hyundai Creta/ix25/Alcazar (SU2); Kia Carens (KY)

Powertrain
- Engine: Petrol: 1.4 L Smartstream G1.4 T-GDi I4; 1.5 L Smartstream G1.5 MPi I4; 1.5 L Smartstream G1.5 T-GDi I4; 1.6 L Gamma MPi I4; 1.6 L Gamma T-GDi I4; 1.6 L Smartstream G1.6 T-GDi I4; 2.0 L Nu MPi I4; Diesel: 1.5 L U II CRDi I4; 1.6 L U II CRDi I4
- Transmission: 6-speed manual; 6-speed automatic; 8-speed automatic; 7-speed DCT; CVT

Dimensions
- Wheelbase: 2,630 mm (103.5 in) (SP2); 2,610 mm (102.8 in) (SP2i); 2,650 mm (104.3 in) (SP2c)
- Length: 4,370 mm (172.0 in) (SP2, pre-facelift); 4,390 mm (172.8 in) (SP2, facelift); 4,315 mm (169.9 in) (SP2i, pre-facelift); 4,365 mm (171.9 in) (SP2i, facelift); 4,345 mm (171.1 in) (SP2c)
- Width: 1,800 mm (70.9 in)
- Height: 1,600–1,630 mm (63.0–64.2 in) (SP2); 1,620–1,645 mm (63.8–64.8 in) (SP2i/SP2c)
- Curb weight: 1,337–1,510 kg (2,948–3,329 lb) (SP2); 1,221–1,361 kg (2,692–3,000 lb) (SP2i); 1,220 kg (2,690 lb) (SP2c)

Chronology
- Predecessor: Kia KX3 (first generation) (China)

The Seltos started as two concept cars, the SP Concept, which was showcased at the New Delhi 2018 Auto Expo in February 2018, and the SP Signature showcased at the 2019 Seoul Motor Show in March 2019. Both concept cars have a close resemblance with the current mass-production versions. The SP Concept previewed the SP2i Seltos built in India, while the SP Signature is the concept version of the South Korean-made SP2 Seltos.

The Seltos was launched in South Korea on 18 July 2019, India on 22 August 2019, and the Philippines on 6 November 2019 with a release in various global markets except Europe by the end of the year. The Seltos was also launched in Indonesia on 20 January 2020. The Seltos was launched in the United States, Canada, and Mexico in early 2020 for the 2021 model year. It was also introduced in Russia in June 2020.

According to Kia Motors Europe COO Emilio Herrera, Kia does not offer Seltos in Europe due to the popularity of larger SUV offerings such as the Sportage and Sorento, and the release of the Stonic and XCeed in the small SUV segment.

In 2020 and 2021, the Seltos was the second best-selling Kia model globally after the Sportage, with India as its largest single market.

=== SP2 model ===
SP2 is the internal codename designated to the South Korean built Seltos (unlike the Chinese-built SP2c and the Indian-built SP2i). This version is also assembled from knock-down kits in Russia and Uzbekistan. The SP2 Seltos is built on a platform shared with the Hyundai Kona and the Kia Soul.

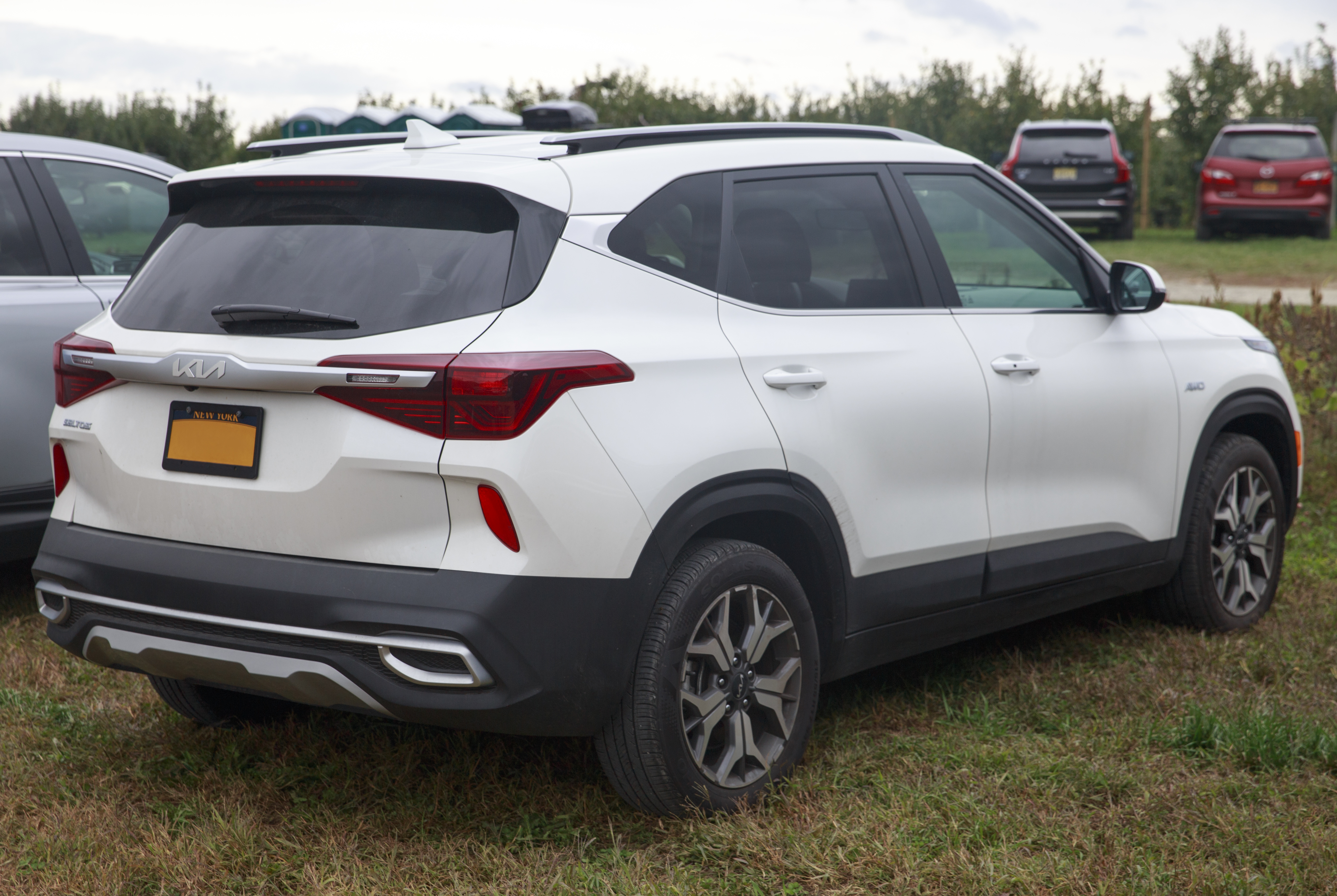
Rear view (pre-facelift; US)

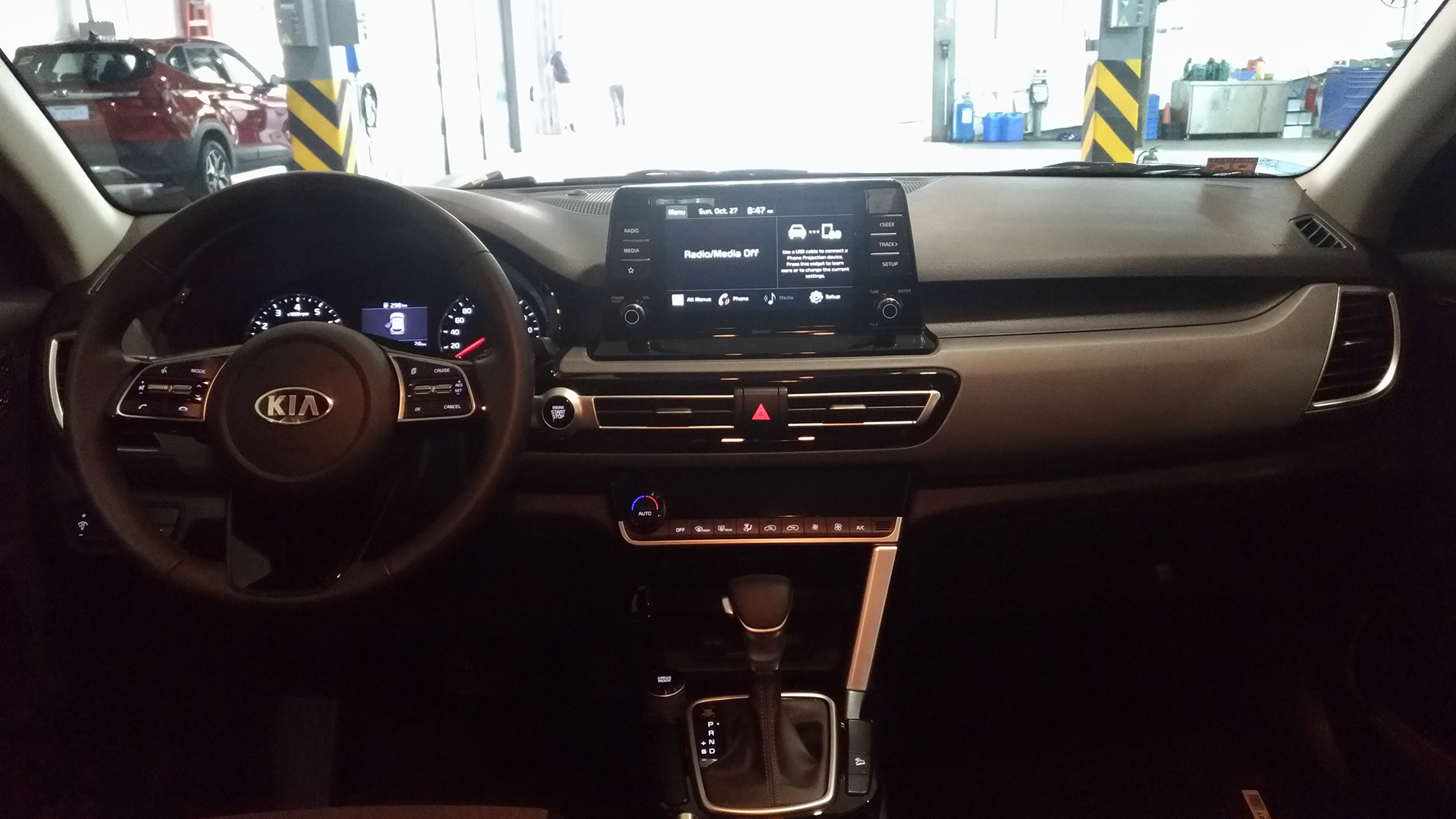
Interior (pre-facelift)

==== Facelift ====
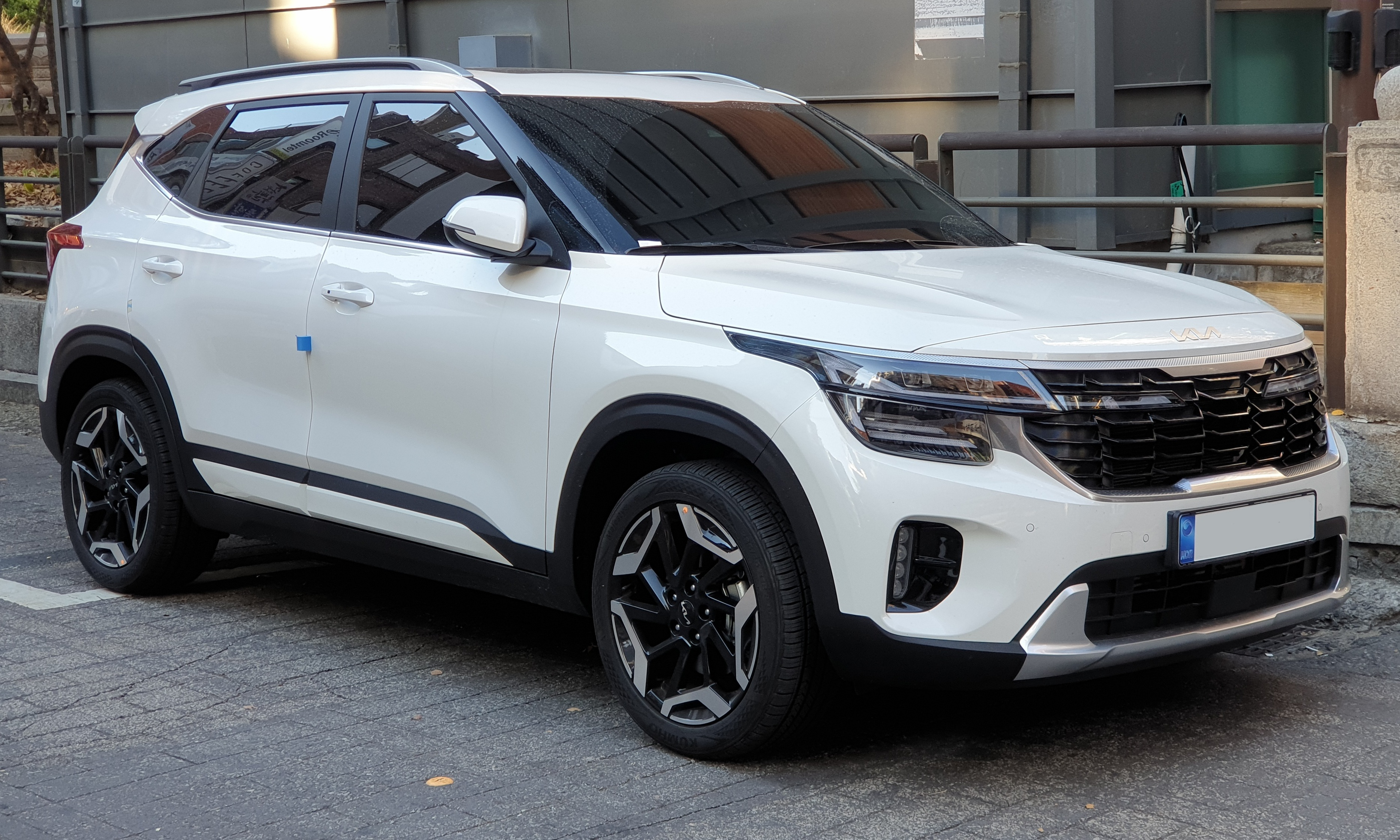
Facelift

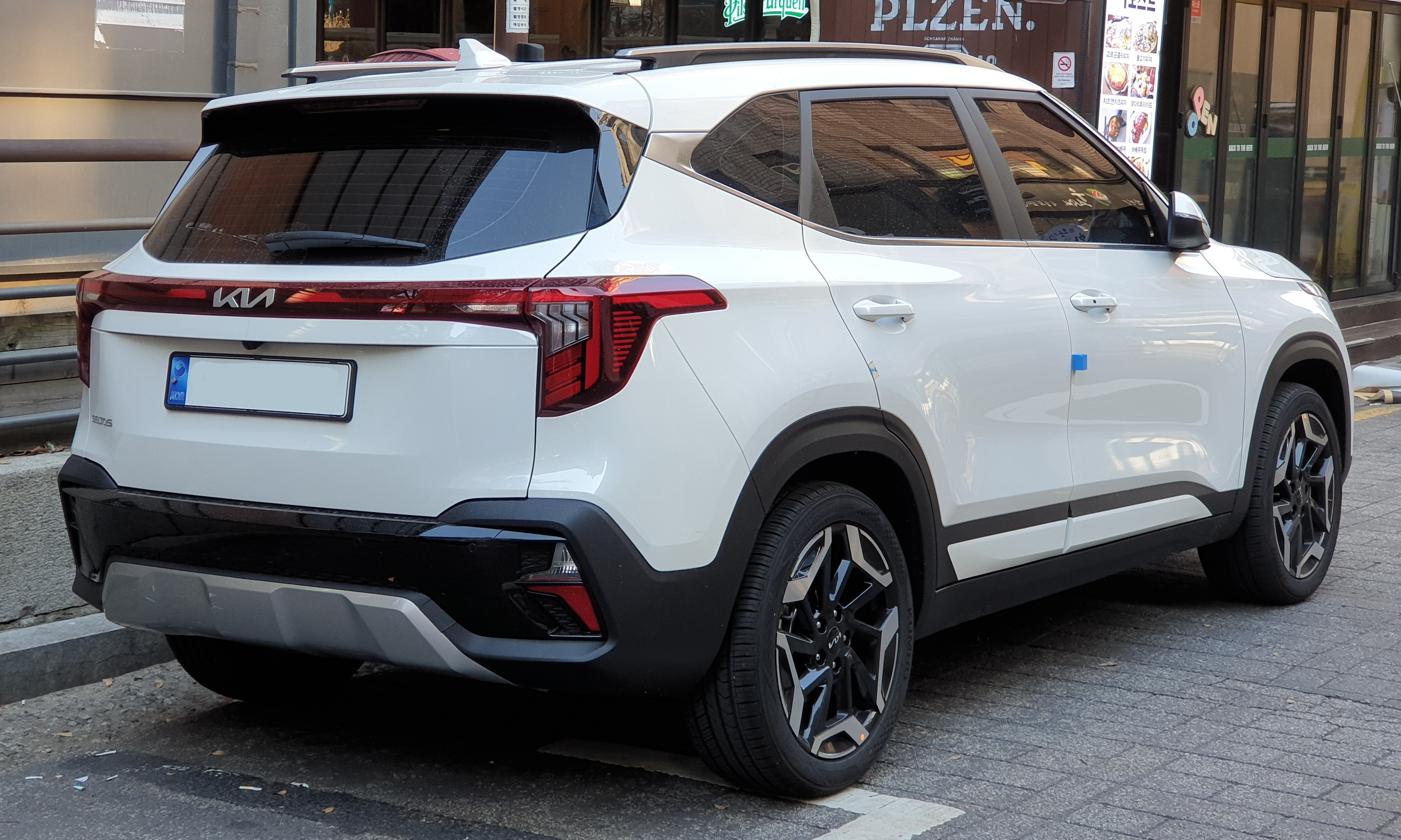
Facelift

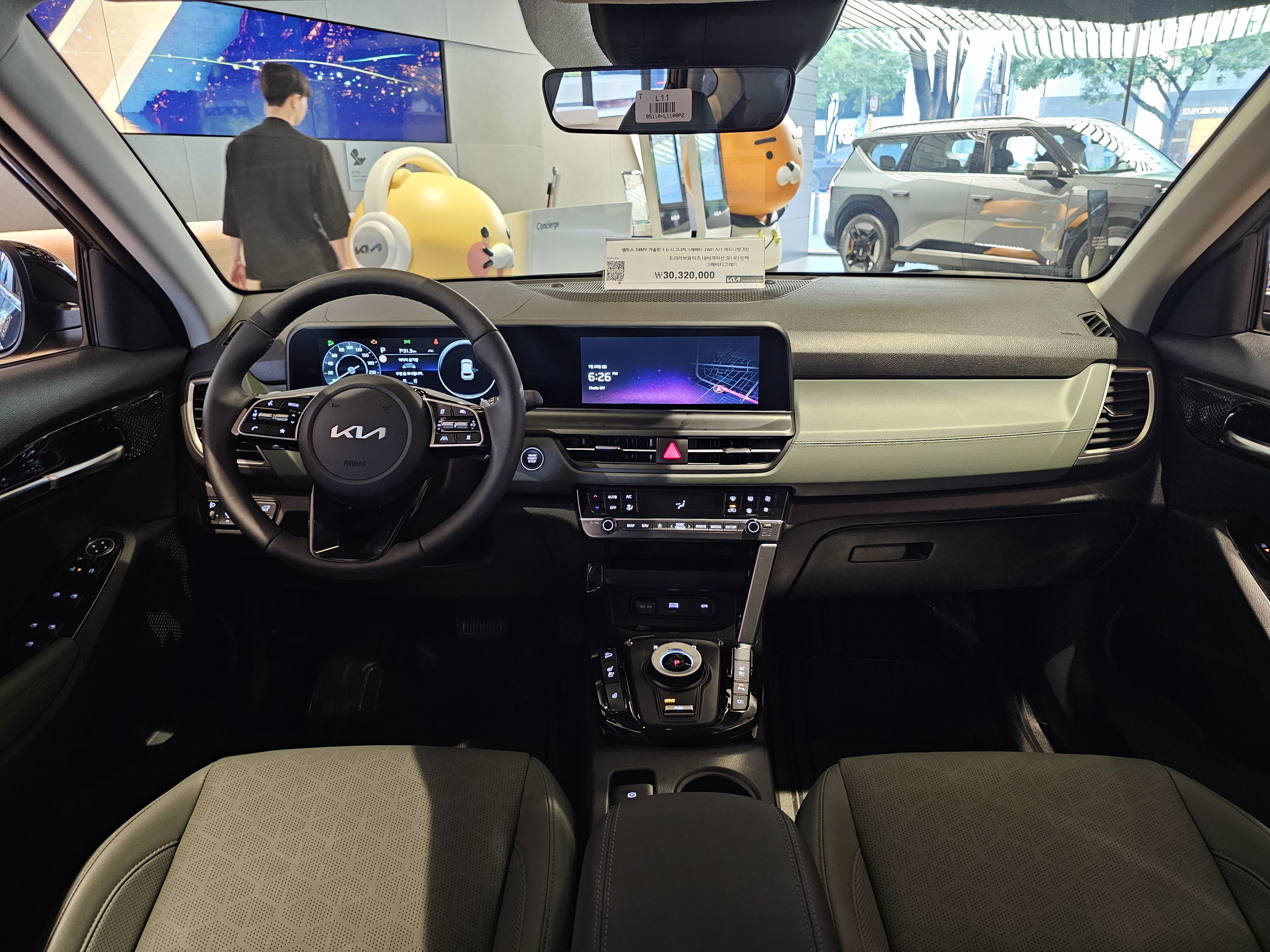
Interior

==== South Korea ====
The Seltos (SP2) debuted in South Korea on 18 July 2019. Positioned above the Stonic, it is offered with two engine options, the 1.6-litre Gamma turbo petrol engine that runs on maximum of 177 PS (130 kW; 175 hp) and 27 kg⋅m (265 N⋅m; 195 lbf⋅ft) of torque with a claimed fuel efficiency of 13 km/L (7.7 L/100 km; 31 mpg_{‑US}; 37 mpg_{‑imp}), and the other is a 1.6-litre U-Line diesel engine is equipped with maximum of 136 PS (134 hp; 100 kW) and 32.6 kg⋅m (320 N⋅m; 236 lbf⋅ft) of torque with a claimed fuel economy of 18 km/L (5.6 L/100 km; 42 mpg_{‑US}; 51 mpg_{‑imp}). Both engines are equipped with a seven-speed dual-clutch transmission. It is also available with an all-wheel drive option.

Several driver-assist functions including forward collision-avoidance assist, lane-following assist, lane-keeping assist, driver-attention warning, and high-beam assist are available as standard for all trims.

The updated model was first unveiled in July 2022. The refreshed model features redesigned front clip, rear tailgate assembly, and other revisions. The dashboard design was revised with a single display that houses a 10.25-inch cluster and a 10.25-inch infotainment system screen, and a shift-by-wire gear lever design.

==== North America ====
North America

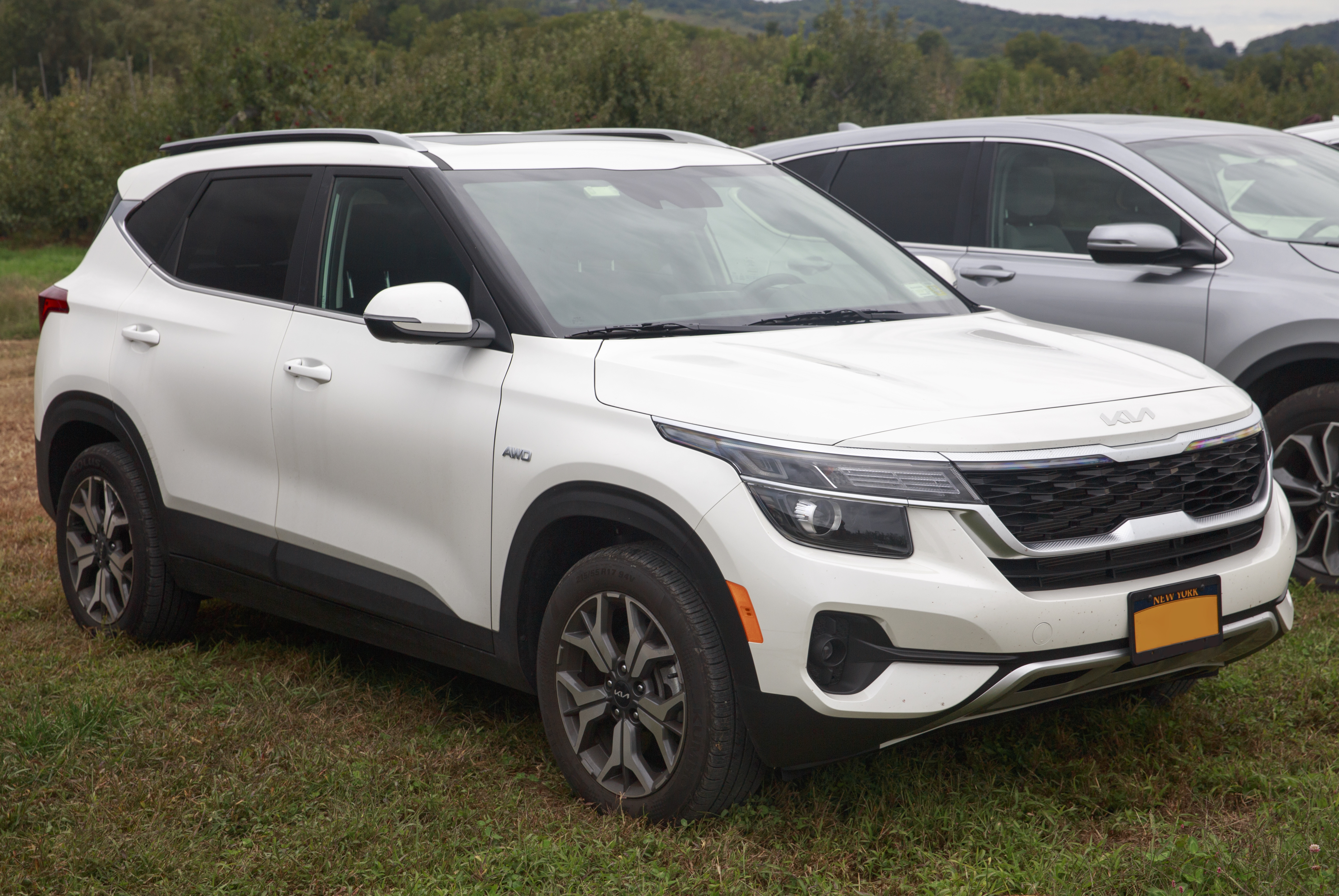
Pre-facelift

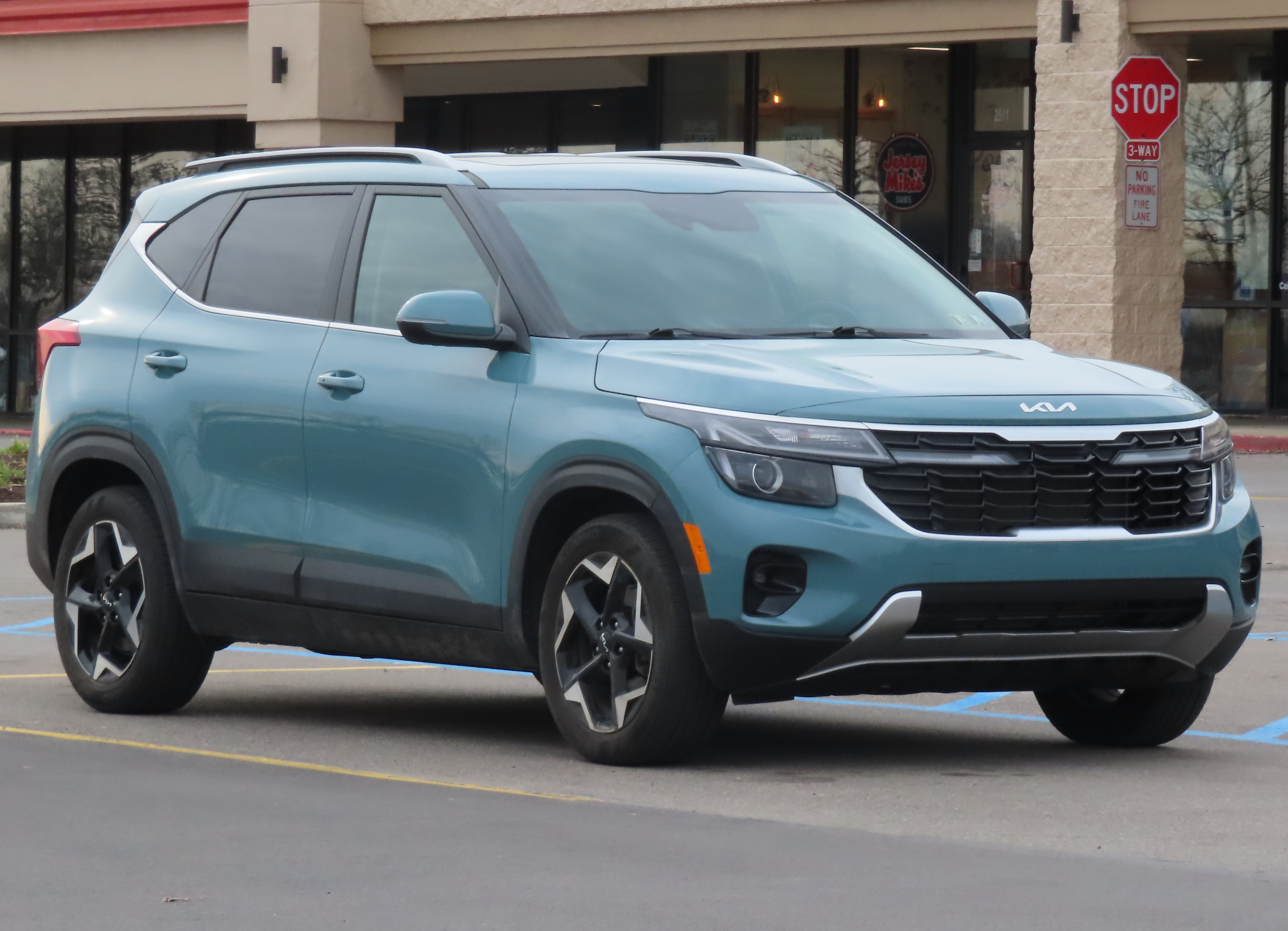
Facelift

Launched for the 2021 model year, the Seltos for the U.S. and Canada is positioned between the Soul and Sportage. It has a redesigned front bumper to maximize the front approach angle. Trim levels for the 2021 Seltos are LX, S, S Turbo, EX, and SX Turbo.

The North American Kia Seltos offers a naturally aspirated 2.0-liter with 149 PS (110 kW; 147 hp) and 18.3 kg⋅m (179 N⋅m; 132 lb⋅ft) of torque, standard on LX, S, and EX trims with a CVT gearbox marketed as "Intelligent Variable Transmission" (IVT). Also offered is a 1.6-liter turbo engine producing 177 PS (130 kW; 175 hp) and 27 kg⋅m (265 N⋅m; 195 lb⋅ft) of torque. Standard on the Seltos SX and optional on the S, the 1.6 Turbo comes with a seven-speed dual-clutch automatic transmission. All-wheel drive is available and standard on most trims except for the S model, where it is optional and has similar mechanical components as the larger Telluride.

For the 2022 model year, the Seltos received a new Kia badge with the updated Kia logo and a Nightfall Edition trim that replaced the Turbo S model.

In Mexico, the SP2 Seltos is not offered, as the Indian-sourced SP2i Seltos is sold in the country instead.

==== Australia ====
The Seltos launched in October 2019 in the Australian market. The five grades consist of S, Sport, Sport+, Sport+ AWD, and GT-Line. Engine choice for lower end variants consist of the Nu 2.0-litre petrol engine mated to CVT, while higher end AWD models are powered by the 1.6-litre Gamma T-GDi engine with a seven-speed DCT. It is equipped with a region-specific suspension tuning to suit the road conditions in Australia.

The facelifted Seltos arrived in Australia in November 2022. It featured a refreshed design and a new dashboard. The 2.0 petrol drivetrain remained unchanged but the 1.6 T-GDI was updated for the new Smartstream G1.6 and the transmission was updated to a 8-speed auto instead of the previous 7-speed DCT.

In September 2020, Kia Australia issued a recall on 2,465 units of the Seltos sold between 25 October 2019 and 25 August 2020. The affected units are to be fitted with an antitheft locking mechanism in the steering wheel column shaft to meet Australian Design Rules. The Seltos was the 25th-highest selling vehicle in Australia in 2020. For 2023, the vehicle was the fifth highest selling SUV in its class of SUVs under $45,000.

==== Other markets ====
The SP2 model was also offered in the Philippines (until 2023) and Russia (until 2022). CKD assembly of the SP2 Seltos commenced in Avtotor plant in Kaliningrad from April 2020.

=== Safety ===
Global NCAP 1.0 test results (India) Kia Seltos – 2 Airbags (2020, similar to Latin NCAP 2013)
Test	Score	Stars
Adult occupant protection	8.03/17.00	3 /5 stars
Child occupant protection	15.00/49.00	2 /5 stars

Kia Seltos SP2 NHTSA crash test ratings (2020):
Frontal driver:	5/5 stars
Frontal passenger:	4/5 stars
Side driver:	5/5 stars
Side rear passenger:	5/5 stars
Rollover:	4/5 stars

The SP2 Seltos received a five-star rating from Australasian New Car Assessment Program, and a four-star rating from the U.S. National Highway Traffic Safety Administration.

ANCAP test results* Kia Seltos all variants (2019, aligned with Euro NCAP)
Test	Points	%
Overall:	5 /5 stars	
Adult occupant:	32.6	85%
Child occupant:	40.9	83%
Pedestrian:	29.3	61%
Safety assist:	9.1	70%

ANCAP test results* Kia Seltos all variants (2019, aligned with Euro NCAP)
Test	Points	%
Overall:	5 /5 stars	
Adult occupant:	32.6	85%
Child occupant:	40.9	83%
Pedestrian:	29.3	61%
Safety assist:	9.1	70%

=== Engines ===
Seltos (SP2) engine options
Petrol engines
Model	Engine	Power	Torque	Transmissions	Acceleration 0–100 km/h (0-62 mph) (official)
1.6 L Gamma MPI	1,591 cc (97.1 cu in) I4	123 PS (90 kW; 121 hp) @ 6,300 rpm 121 PS (89 kW; 119 hp) @ 6,300 rpm	15.4 kg⋅m (151 N⋅m; 111 lb⋅ft) @ 4,850 rpm	6-speed manual	12.2s (FWD); 12.9s (AWD)
1.6 L Gamma MPI	1,591 cc (97.1 cu in) I4	123 PS (90 kW; 121 hp) @ 6,300 rpm 121 PS (89 kW; 119 hp) @ 6,300 rpm	15.4 kg⋅m (151 N⋅m; 111 lb⋅ft) @ 4,850 rpm	6-speed automatic	12.3s (FWD); 12.6s (AWD)
1.6 L Gamma T-GDI	1,591 cc (97.1 cu in) turbocharged I4	177 PS (130 kW; 175 hp) @ 5,500 rpm	27 kg⋅m (265 N⋅m; 195 lb⋅ft) @ 1,500–4,500 rpm	7-speed DCT	8.4s
1.6 L Smartstream G1.6 T-GDI	1,598 cc (97.5 cu in) turbocharged I4	198 PS (146 kW; 195 hp) @ 6,000 rpm	27 kg⋅m (265 N⋅m; 195 lb⋅ft) @ 1,600–4,500 rpm	8-speed automatic	
2.0 L Nu MPI	1,999 cc (122.0 cu in) I4	149 PS (110 kW; 147 hp) @ 6,200 rpm	18.3 kg⋅m (179 N⋅m; 132 lb⋅ft) @ 4,500 rpm	CVT	9.6s (FWD); 10.4s (AWD)
Diesel engine
Model	Engine	Power	Torque	Transmissions	Acceleration 0–100 km/h (0-62 mph) (official)
1.6 L U II CRDi VGT	1,598 cc (97.5 cu in) turbocharged I4	136 PS (100 kW; 134 hp) @ 4,000 rpm	32.6 kg⋅m (320 N⋅m; 236 lb⋅ft) @ 2,000–2,250 rpm	6-speed automatic	

=== SP2i model ===
SP2i is the internally designated codename for the Seltos model manufactured in India and exported mostly to emerging markets. The SP2i Seltos is shorter by 60 mm (2.4 in) in length and 20 mm (0.8 in) in wheelbase compared to the SP2.

Visually, the SP2i Seltos can be identified from the SP2 Seltos by the hood line that ends by the grille that creates a seamless "clamshell" hood design, while for the SP2 Seltos, the hood line ends behind the Kia logo. The front end region is also slightly shorter and the rear bumper is flatter in design. The SP2i Seltos along with the Chinese KX3 also has a different interior dashboard design compared to the SP2 Seltos with a simpler HVAC vent design and an integrated infotainment screen housing.

The SP2i model is not offered with all-wheel drive in any markets.

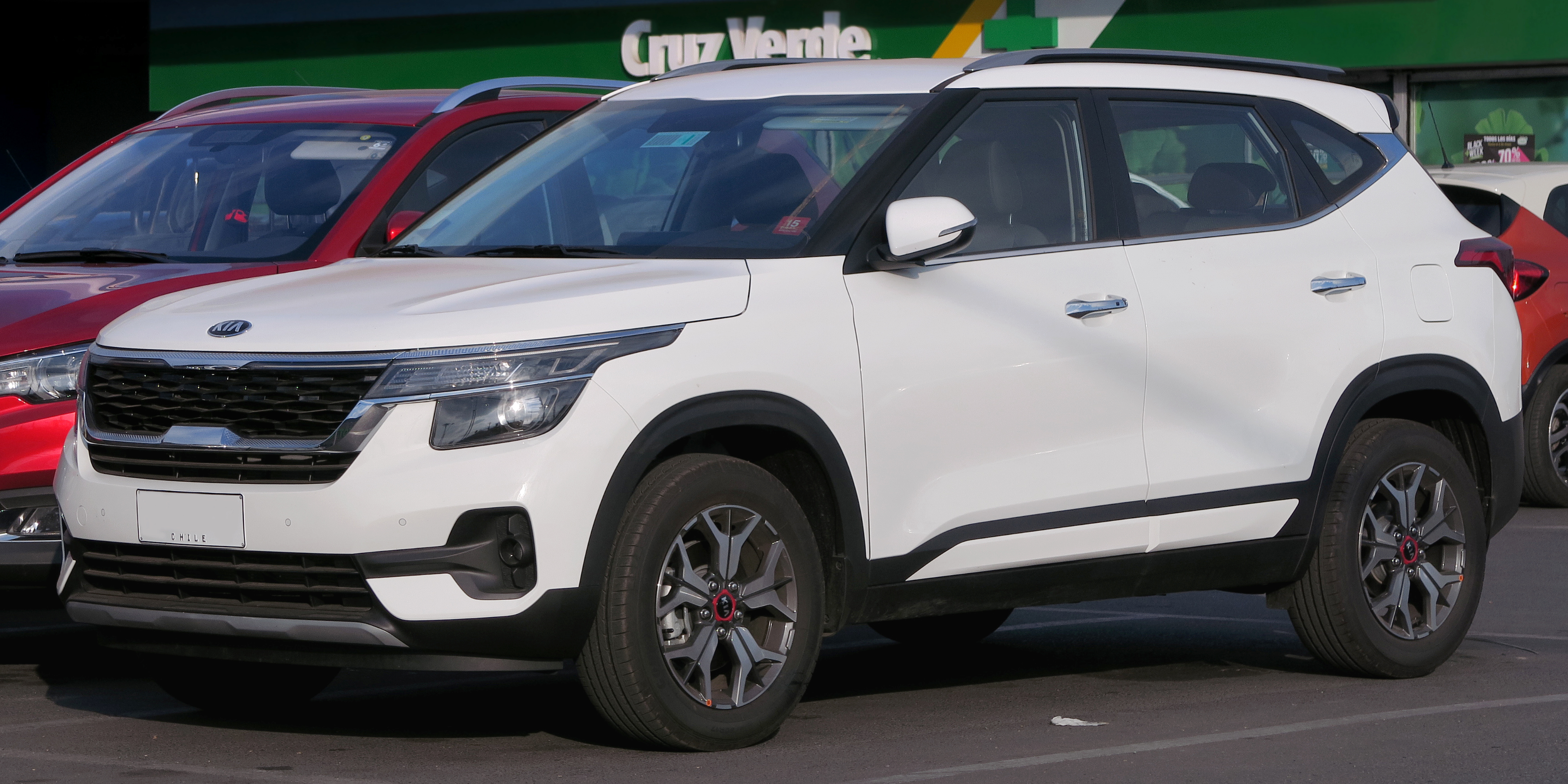
Kia Seltos (SP2i) (pre-facelift)

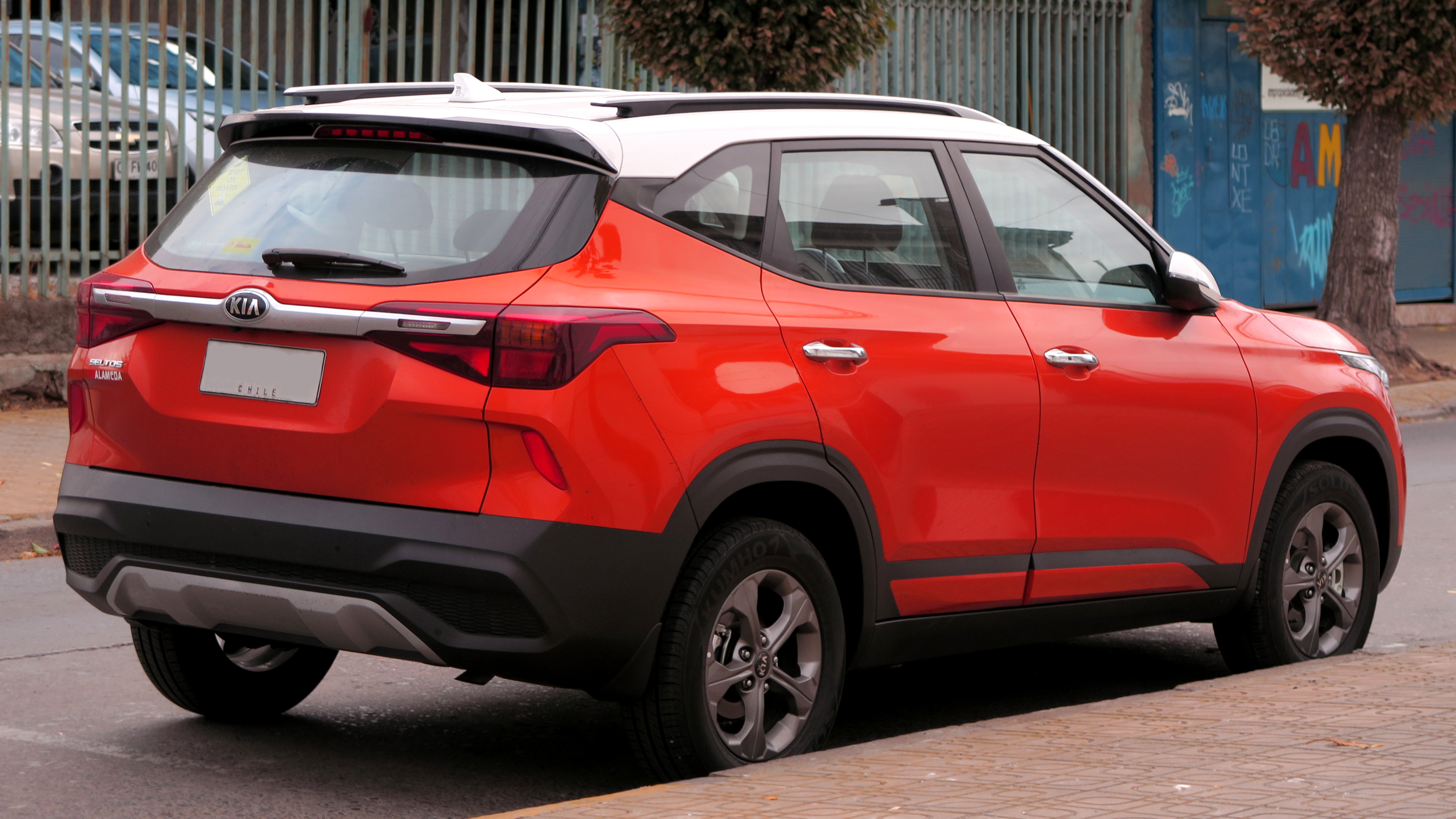
Rear view (pre-facelift)

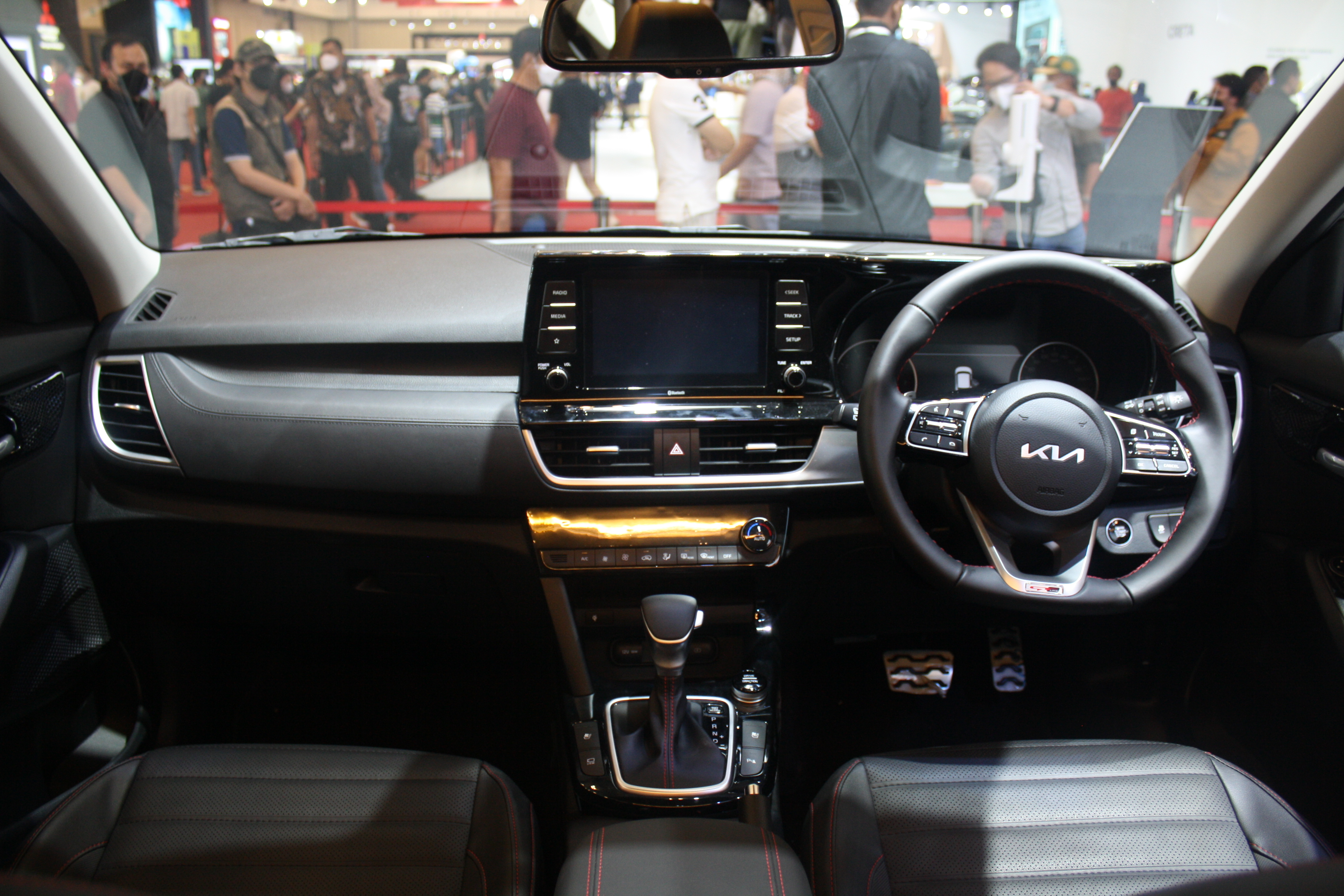
Interior (pre-facelift)

==== India ====
The Seltos is the first product of Kia India following its entry in the country. The crossover was unveiled in New Delhi on 20 June 2019. By the time of its launch on 22 August 2019, Kia had received more than 50,000 bookings for the Seltos. Later, the Seltos emerged as the best-selling SUV in the country by delivering 12,854 units in October 2019. As of 1 April 2020, the Seltos sales crossed the 80,000 mark in India.

In India, the Seltos is offered in two submodels, which are the Tech Line and GT Line. Three engine options are offered in India, consisting of two petrol engines and one diesel engine. The petrol engines are the 1.5-litre, naturally aspirated engine that makes 115 PS (85 kW; 113 hp) paired with six-speed manual transmission, six-speed iMT transmission and CVT, and a 1.4-liter Kappa turbo engine that produces 140 PS (103 kW; 138 hp) paired with six-speed manual transmission or a seven-speed dual-clutch transmission (DCT). The diesel engine is a 1.5-litre U-Line unit that produces 115 PS (85 kW; 113 hp) paired with six-speed manual transmission, six-speed iMT or six-speed torque-converter automatic.

In August 2021, a new sub-model named X-Line was introduced in India. The new X-Line consist only of cosmetic changes rather than mechanical changes. The trim is available in two engine options, 1.4-litre turbo petrol engine and the 1.5-litre CRDi diesel. Upgrades included 18-inch alloy wheels and piano black trim highlights.

===== Facelift =====
The refreshed model of the SP2i Seltos was released in India in July 2023. The model features a similar styling to the 2023 facelift of the South Korean-made Seltos. It is offered in two submodels, which are the Tech Line, GT Line, and X-Line. New equipment were introduced, such as a dual screen set-up with two 10.25-inch displays, electronic parking brake, panoramic sunroof, and an advanced driver-assistance system (ADAS).

Following a brief discontinuation, Kia reintroduced a turbo-petrol engine in India. A 1.5-litre turbocharged petrol engine replaces the older 1.4-litre version engine that was phased out in March 2023 as it did not meet Bharat Stage 6 Phase 2 emissions norms. The new engine is mated to a 6-speed clutchless 'intelligent' manual transmission (iMT) or a 7-speed dual-clutch automatic gearbox.

2024 Seltos (facelift; India)

2024 Seltos (facelift; India)

==== Other markets ====
The Indian-built Seltos is exported to several regions, which mostly are emerging markets, including South Africa, North Africa, Southeast Asia (except the Philippines), the Middle East (except the UAE), and other South Asian markets. It is also assembled by kits in Vietnam starting from July 2020. The exported pre-facelift version of the Seltos from India was available with a 1.6-litre petrol engine, which is not offered in the Indian domestic market.

It was updated for the Mexican market on 6 August 2021, incorporating the new Kia logo. Since August 2023, with the facelifted model Kia Mexico started sourcing the Seltos from China instead of India. The Seltos was the best-selling SUV in Mexico in 2020 and 2021.

=== Safety ===
2020 Kia Seltos SP2i 'HTE' RHD (2 airbags)
Global NCAP 1.0 scores (2020, based on Latin NCAP 2013)
Adult occupant stars	3/5 stars
Adult occupant score	8.03/17.00
Child occupant stars	2/5 stars
Child occupant score	15.00/49.00

The Indian-specification Seltos is equipped as standard with two frontal airbags, two front side thorax-protecting airbags (6 airbags made standard in July 2022), antilock brakes, electronic stability control (made standard in April 2022), all-wheel disc brakes, rear parking sensors and front seatbelt reminders. Head-protecting curtain airbags are available on higher trim levels, as are tyre pressure monitoring and blind spot detection.

Global NCAP 1.0 crash-tested the Indian-market Kia Seltos in its basic safety specification (of the time) of two airbags and anti-lock brakes in 2020 (similar to Latin NCAP 2013). The car scored three stars out of five for adult occupant protection in a 64 km/h frontal offset impact. The Seltos did not score any points for dynamics for child occupants because Kia refused to nominate child seats for the test.

Body-in-white repair manuals confirm that the SP2i has different dimensions, shapes and parts from the SP2, and also show that hot-formed reinforcements that aid energy dissipation in the IIHS driver-side small overlap test, which are present in the SP2, are missing in the SP2i.

=== Engines ===
Seltos (SP2i) engine options
Petrol engines
Model	Engine	Power	Torque	Transmissions	Years
Smartstream G1.4 T-GDi	1,353 cc (82.6 cu in) turbocharged I4	140 PS (103 kW; 138 hp) @ 6,000 rpm	24.7 kg⋅m (242 N⋅m; 179 lb⋅ft) @ 1,500–3,200 rpm	6-speed manual 7-speed DCT	2019–2023
Smartstream G1.5 MPI	1,497 cc (91.4 cu in) I4	115 PS (85 kW; 113 hp) @ 6,300 rpm	14.7 kg⋅m (144 N⋅m; 106 lb⋅ft) @ 4,500 rpm	6-speed manual CVT; 6-speed clutchless manual (iMT)	2019–present
Smartstream G1.5 T-GDi	1,482 cc (90.4 cu in) I4	160 PS (118 kW; 158 hp) @ 5,500 rpm	25.8 kg⋅m (253 N⋅m; 187 lbf⋅ft) @ 1,500-3,500 rpm	6-speed clutchless manual (iMT); 7-speed DCT	2023–present
1.6 Gamma MPI	1,591 cc (97.1 cu in) I4	123 PS (90 kW; 121 hp) @ 6,300 rpm	15.4 kg⋅m (151 N⋅m; 111 lb⋅ft) @ 4,850 rpm	6-speed manual 6-speed automatic	2019–present
Diesel engine					
Model	Engine	Power	Torque	Transmissions	
1.5 L U II CRDi VGT	1,493 cc (91.1 cu in) turbocharged I4	115–116 PS (85–85 kW; 113–114 hp) @ 4,000 rpm	25.5 kg⋅m (250 N⋅m; 184 lb⋅ft) @ 1,500–2,750 rpm	6-speed manual 6-speed automatic 6-speed clutchless manual (iMT)	2019–present

=== China (SP2c) ===
In September 2019, the Seltos was unveiled at the Chengdu Motor Show as the second-generation Kia KX3, with the local name KX3 Aopao (傲跑). Coded internally as SP2c, this model debuted in the Chinese market in December 2019. The KX3 has a 2,650 mm (104.3 in) wheelbase, longer than any other versions of the Seltos.

In April 2023, the KX3 was renamed to Seltos coinciding with the release of its refreshed model. The facelifted SP2c replaced the Korea-built SP2 in the Philippines in December 2023 and the Indian-built SP2i for the UAE, and Latin America in August 2023.

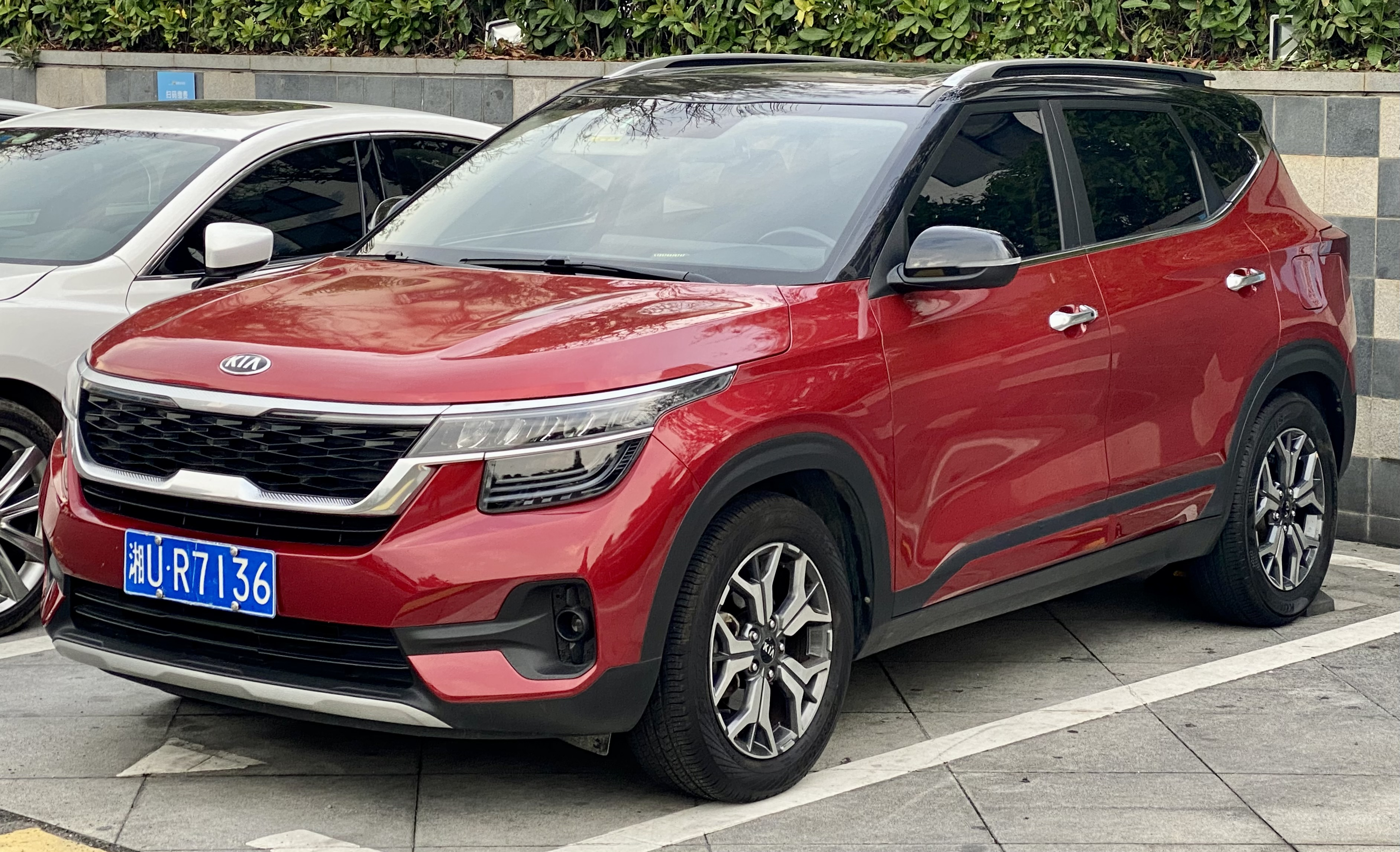
2019 Kia KX3 (pre-facelift)

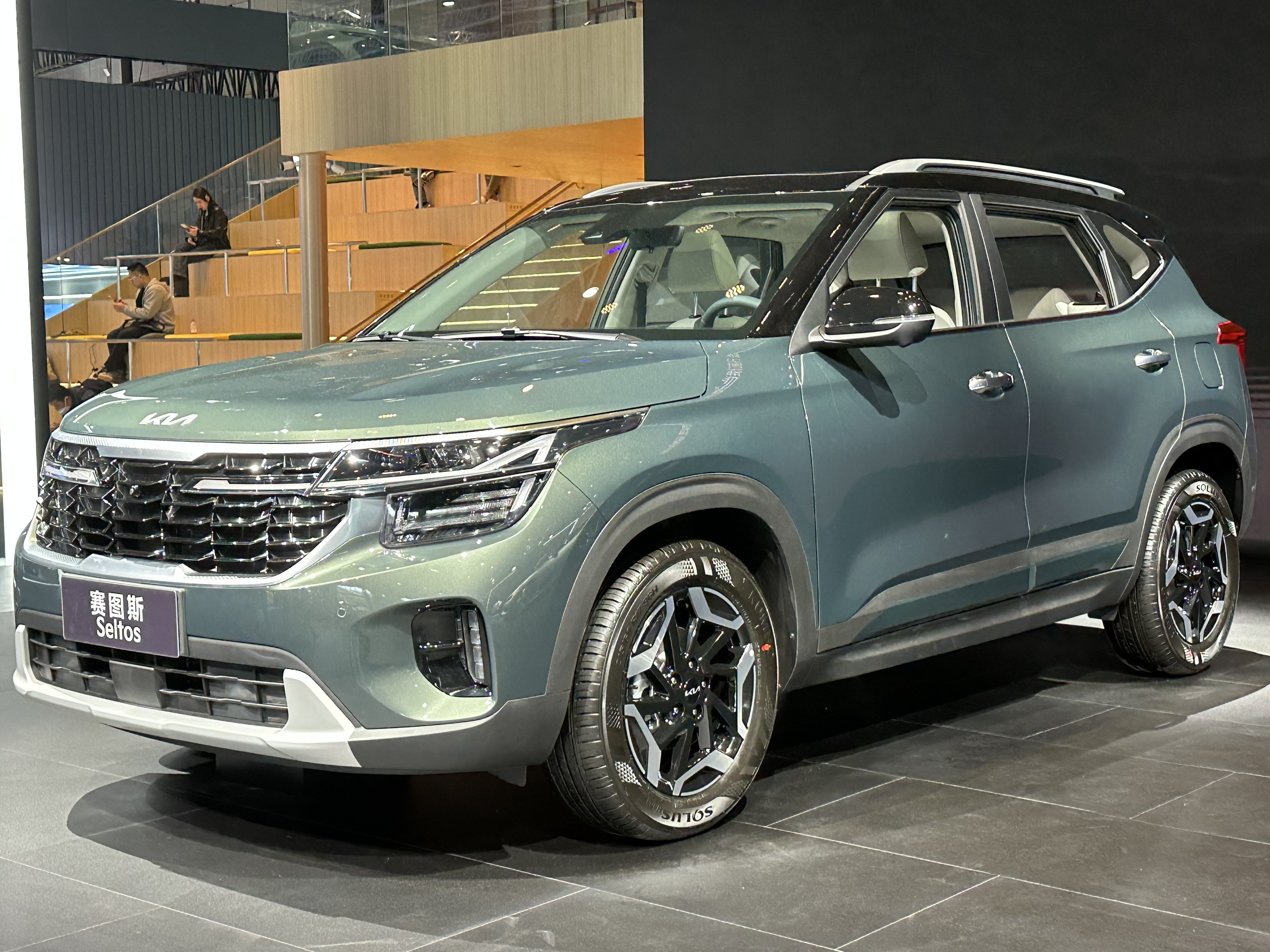
2023 Seltos (facelift)

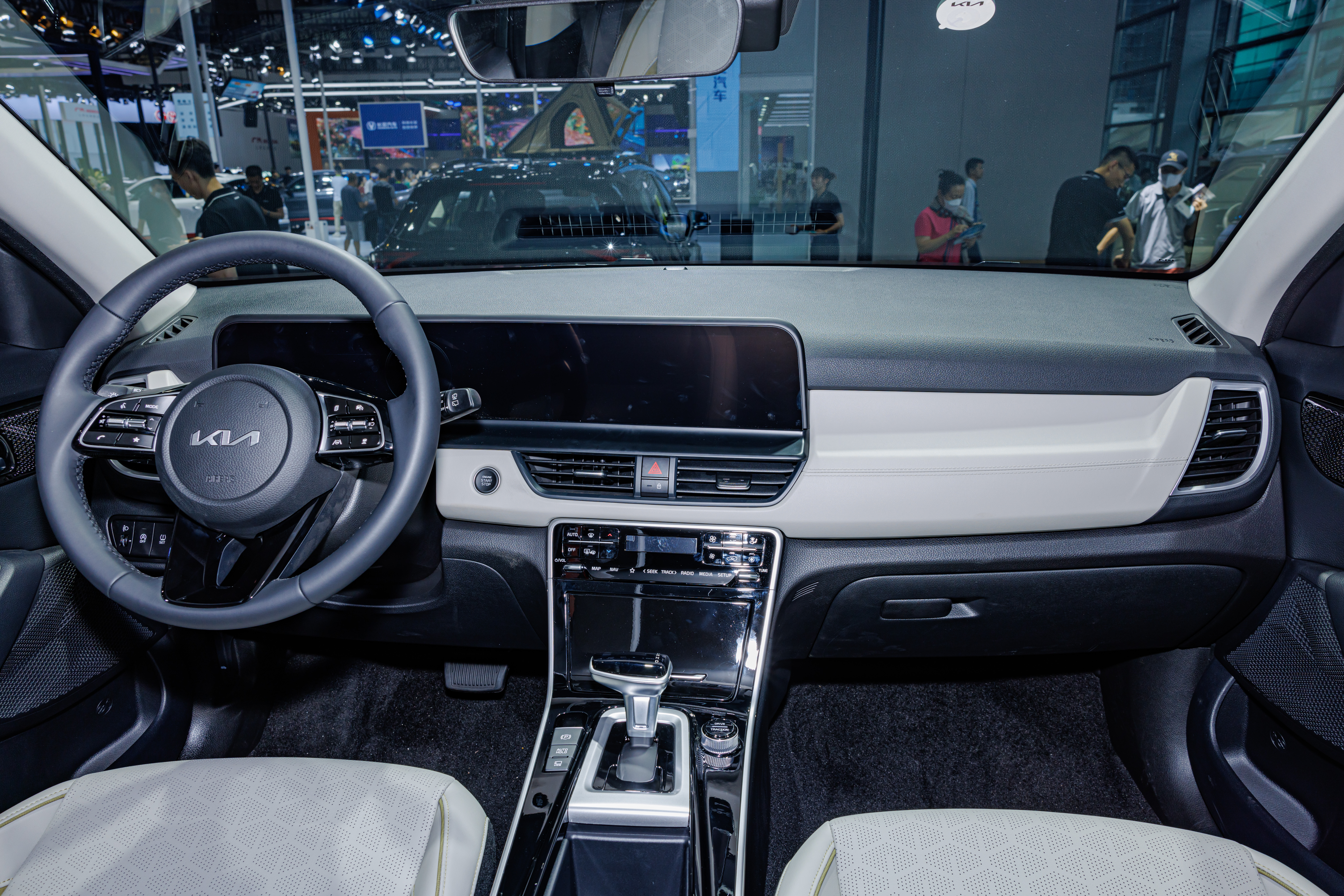
Interior (facelift)

=== Awards ===
U.S. News & World Report ranked the Kia Seltos at No. 4 on its list of Best Subcompact SUVs for 2022, giving it a score of 8.2 out of 10.

== Second generation (SP3; 2025) ==
Second generation
- 2027 Kia Seltos

Overview
- Model code: SP3; SP3i; SP3c
- Production: December 2025 – present
- Model years: 2026–present (North America)
- Assembly: South Korea: Gwangju; India: Anantapur (Kia India); China: Yancheng (Jiangsu Yueda Kia)
- Designer: Karim Habib

Body and chassis
- Class: Compact crossover SUV (C)
- Layout: Front-engine, front-wheel-drive; Front-engine, all-wheel-drive
- Platform: Hyundai-Kia K3
- Related: Hyundai Kona (SX2)

Powertrain
- Engine: Petrol: 1.5 L Smartstream G1.5 MPi I4; 1.5 L Smartstream G1.5 T-GDi I4; 1.6 L Smartstream G1.6 T-GDi I4; 2.0 L Nu MPi I4; Diesel: 1.5 L U II CRDi I4
- Transmission: 6-speed manual; 7-speed DCT; 8-speed automatic; 6-speed DCT (hybrid); CVT

Dimensions
- Wheelbase: 2,690 mm (105.9 in)
- Length: 4,430 mm (174.4 in)
- Width: 1,830 mm (72.0 in)
- Height: 1,600 mm (63.0 in)
- Curb weight: 1,410–1,685 kg (3,109–3,715 lb)

The second-generation Seltos was unveiled simultaneously in Korea, India, Europe, and America on 10 December 2025, marking a significant redesign seven years after the original model.

It is larger from the previous generation, and marketed as a compact crossover SUV.

=== Markets ===
==== Australia ====
The second-generation Seltos was launched in Australia on 2 October 2026, with five trim levels: S, S with Safety Pack, Sport, Sport+ and GT Line. For powertrains, all variants are powered by the 1.6-litre naturally aspirated petrol hybrid with standard front-wheel drive and all-wheel drive option available for the GT Line trim.

==== Brunei ====
The second generation Seltos was launched in Brunei on 13 March 2026. Imported from India, it is offered in GL, GT Line and X-Line variants, all powered by a 1.5-litre naturally aspirated petrol engine mated with IVT.

==== Europe ====
The second generation Seltos was revealed on 14 April 2026, marking the introduction of the nameplate in the region.

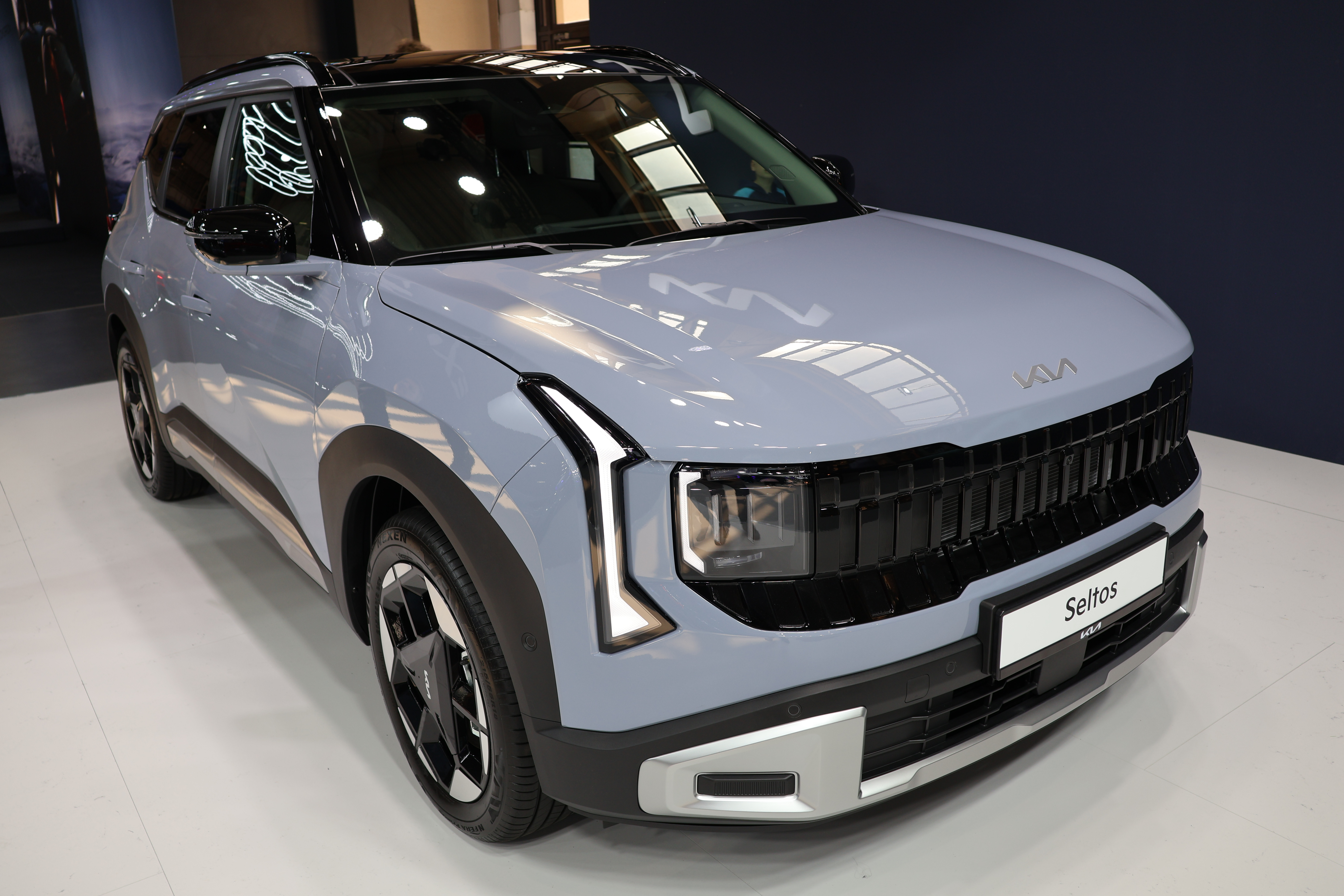
2026 Kia Seltos (Europe)

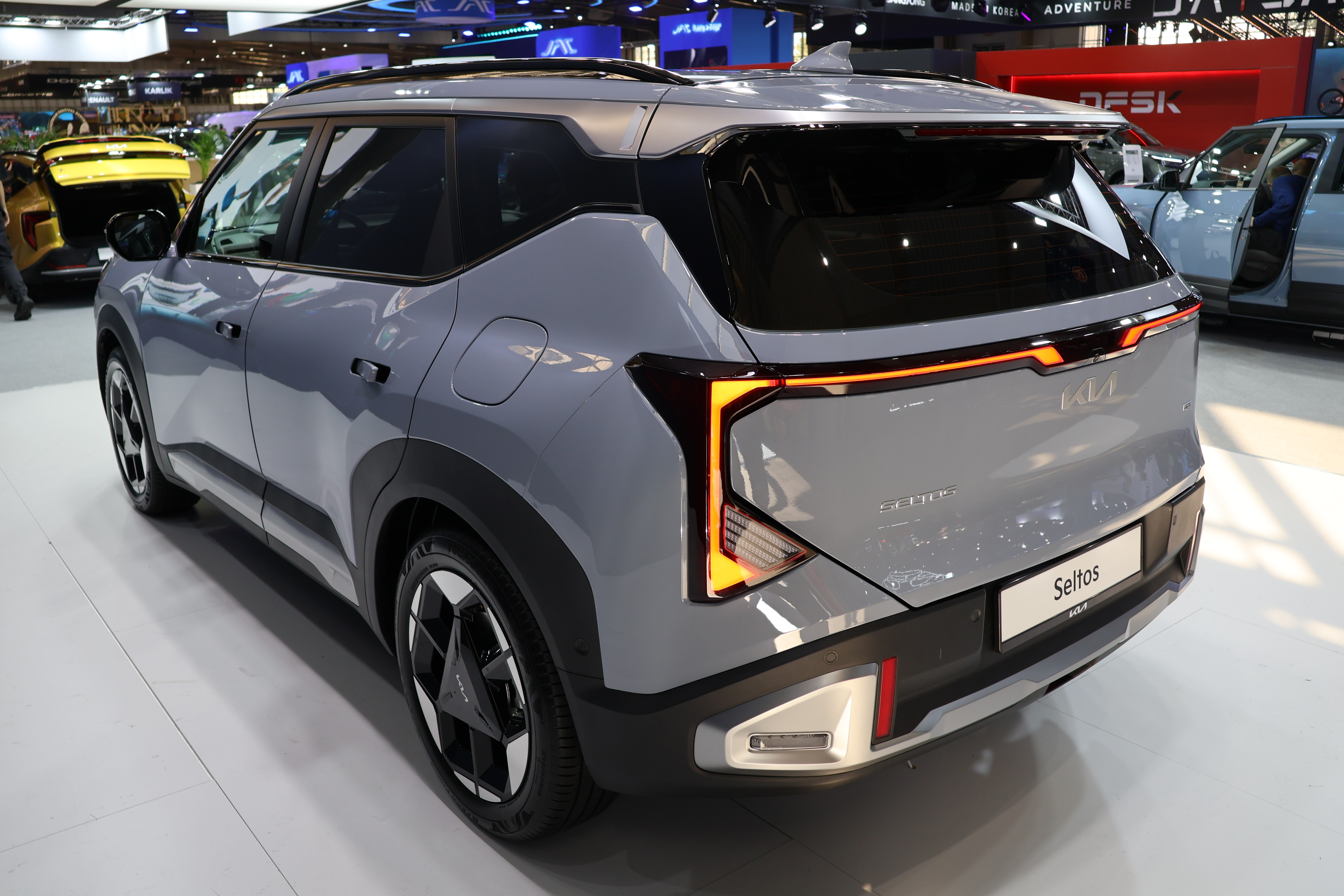
2026 Kia Seltos (Europe)

Interior

==== India ====
The second generation Seltos was launched in India on 2nd January 2026. The variants available for sale include the HT, GT and the X-Line. All the variants can carry the 1.5-litre petrol engine with the naturally-aspirated engine paired with 6-speed manual or an IVT, and turbocharged variants mated with a 6-speed intelligent manual transmission (iMT) or a 7-speed DCT. The diesel-powered engine is mated with 6-speed manual or 6-speed automatic (TC).

==== Indonesia ====
The second generation Seltos was launched in Indonesia on 29 July 2026 at the 33nd Gaikindo Indonesia International Auto Show, with three variants: Trendy, Prestige+ ADAS and GT Line. All variants are powered by the 1.5-litre naturally aspirated petrol engine mated with an IVT.

==== Mexico ====
The second generation Seltos was launched in Mexico on 10 September 2026 for the 2027 model year, with six trim levels: LX, EX, EX Pack, SX, SXL and X Line. For powertrains, the 1.5-litre naturally aspirated petrol engine mated to an IVT for the LX and EX trims, the 1.5-litre T-GDi turbocharged petrol engine mated to a 7-speed dual clutch transmission for the EX Pack and SX trims, and the 1.6-litre naturally aspirated petrol hybrid for the SXL and X Line trims.

==== North America ====
The second generation Seltos was unveiled at the 2026 New York International Auto Show for the 2027 model year. It is available with a naturally aspirated 2.0-litre MPi I4 or a turbocharged 1.6-litre T-GDi I4 engine.

The Seltos is offered in four grades: LX, S, EX, and X-Line. Front-wheel drive is standard for all models except the X-Line, which is only available with all-wheel drive. All other trims offer AWD as an option. The 1.6T engine is only offered with the X-Line (SX).

A hybrid (HEV) model will be added to the North American lineup in late 2026. It will feature a 1.6 L naturally aspirated engine and 6-speed dual-clutch transmission. It will also have an e-AWD drivetrain with the electric motor driving one axle.

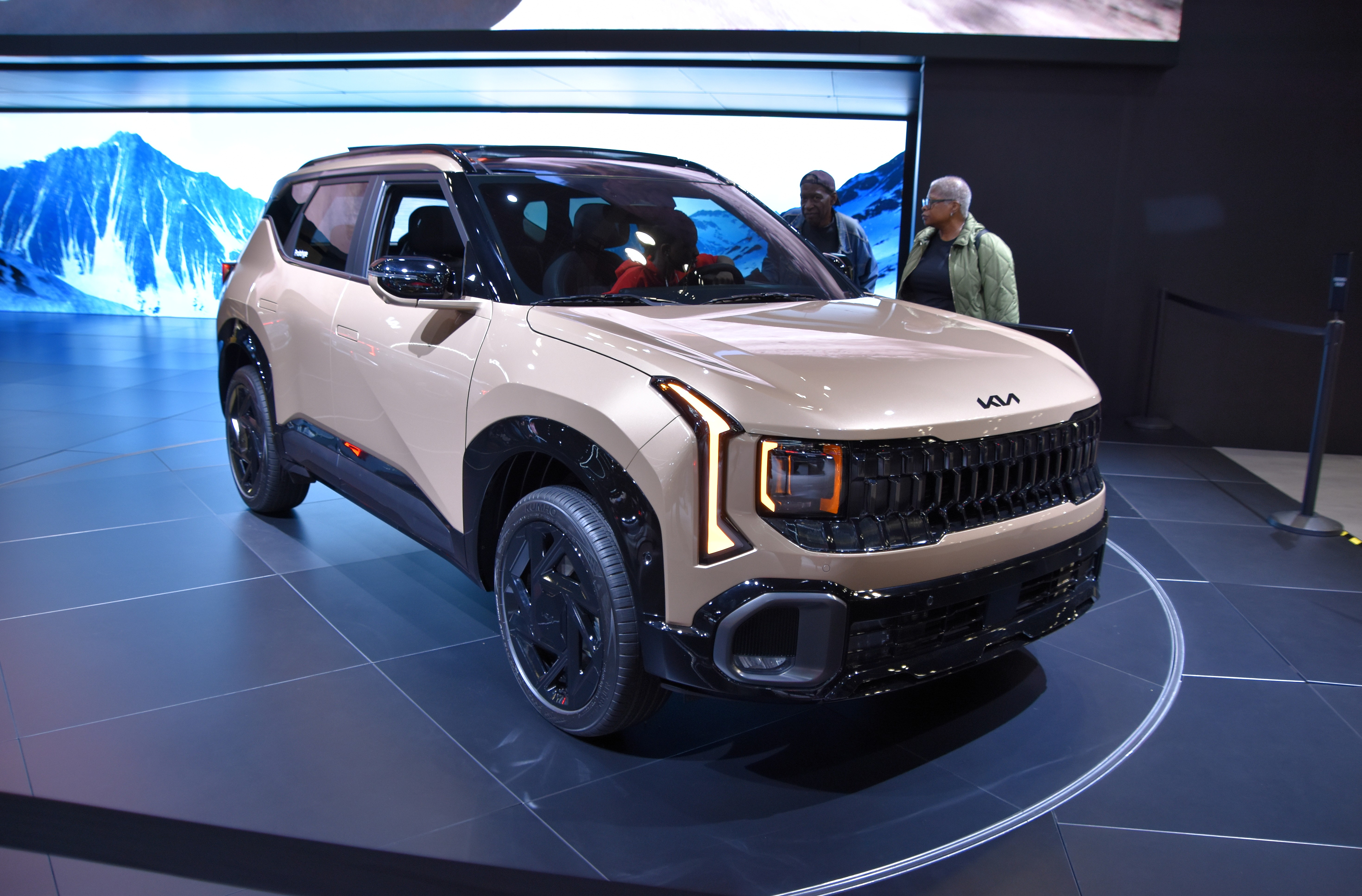
2026 Kia Seltos X-Line (North America)

==== South Africa ====
The second generation Seltos was launched in South Africa on 4 August 2026, with five grades: LS, LX, GT-Line, X-Line and GT-Line S. For powertrains, the 1.5-litre naturally aspirated petrol engine mated to either a 6-speed manual or IVT available on the LS, LX and GT-Line grades, the 1.5-litre CRDi turbocharged diesel engine mated to a 6-speed automatic available on the GT-Line and X-Line trims, and the 1.5-litre T-GDi turbocharged petrol engine mated to a 7-speed dual clutch transmission only available on the GT-Line S trim.

=== Safety ===
Bharat NCAP test results Kia Seltos (2026, based on Latin NCAP 2016)
Test	Score	Stars
Adult occupant protection	31.70/32.00	5 /5 stars
Child occupant protection	45.00/49.00	5 /5 stars

Euro NCAP test results Kia Seltos (2026)
Test	Score
Overall:	5 /5 stars
Safe driving	67%
Crash avoidance	71%
Crash protection	84%
Post crash	90%

== Sales ==
=== Global sales ===
Calendar year	SP2	SP2i	SP2c	Total
2019	47,211	57,719	7,420	112,350
2020	142,823	131,263	44,660	318,746
2021	143,045	148,172	26,817	318,034
2022	135,523	151,408	12,502	299,433
2023	167,930	126,708	45,219	339,857
2024	158,933	79,466	56,707	295,106

=== Regional sales ===
Calendar year	South Korea	India	U.S.	Canada	Mexico	Russia	China	Australia	Vietnam
2019	32,001	45,494					7,414	2,048	
2020	49,481	96,932	46,280	13,016	12,768	12,775	44,660	9,966	6,065
2021	40,090	98,309	51,368	14,436	14,080	17,865	26,817	8,884	16,122
2022	22,335	101,569	45,711		17,137	8,837	12,502	8,504	12,398
2023	50,837	104,891	60,053		19,975		10,084	10,473	9,663
2024	61,897		59,958	18,706	17,128		5,658		6,829
2025			56,798	21,276	15,844		8,258		
