= Kia KX3 =

Subcompact crossover SUV

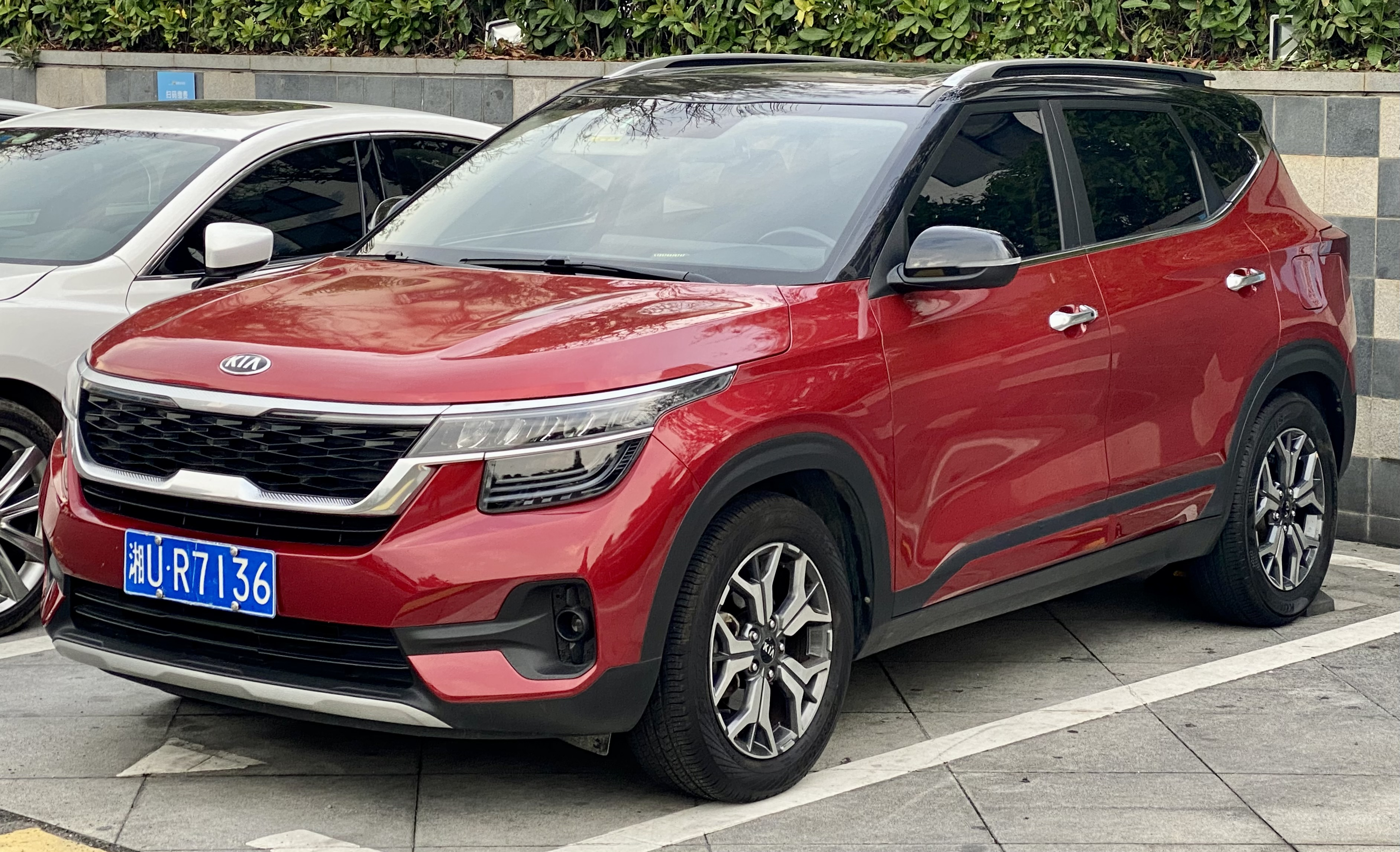
- 2019 Kia KX3

Overview
- Manufacturer: Kia
- Also called: Kia Seltos (2019–present)
- Production: 2015–2023
- Assembly: China: Yancheng, Jiangsu (DYK)

Body and chassis
- Class: Subcompact crossover SUV
- Body style: 5-door SUV

The Kia KX3 is a subcompact crossover SUV manufactured exclusively for the Chinese market by Dongfeng Yueda Kia. Since 2019, it is known as the KX3 Aopao (Chinese: 起亚KX3傲跑; pinyin: Qǐyà KX3 Àopǎo). From 2023, the Kia KX3 Aopao was renamed to Kia Seltos.

== First generation (KC; 2015) ==
First generation
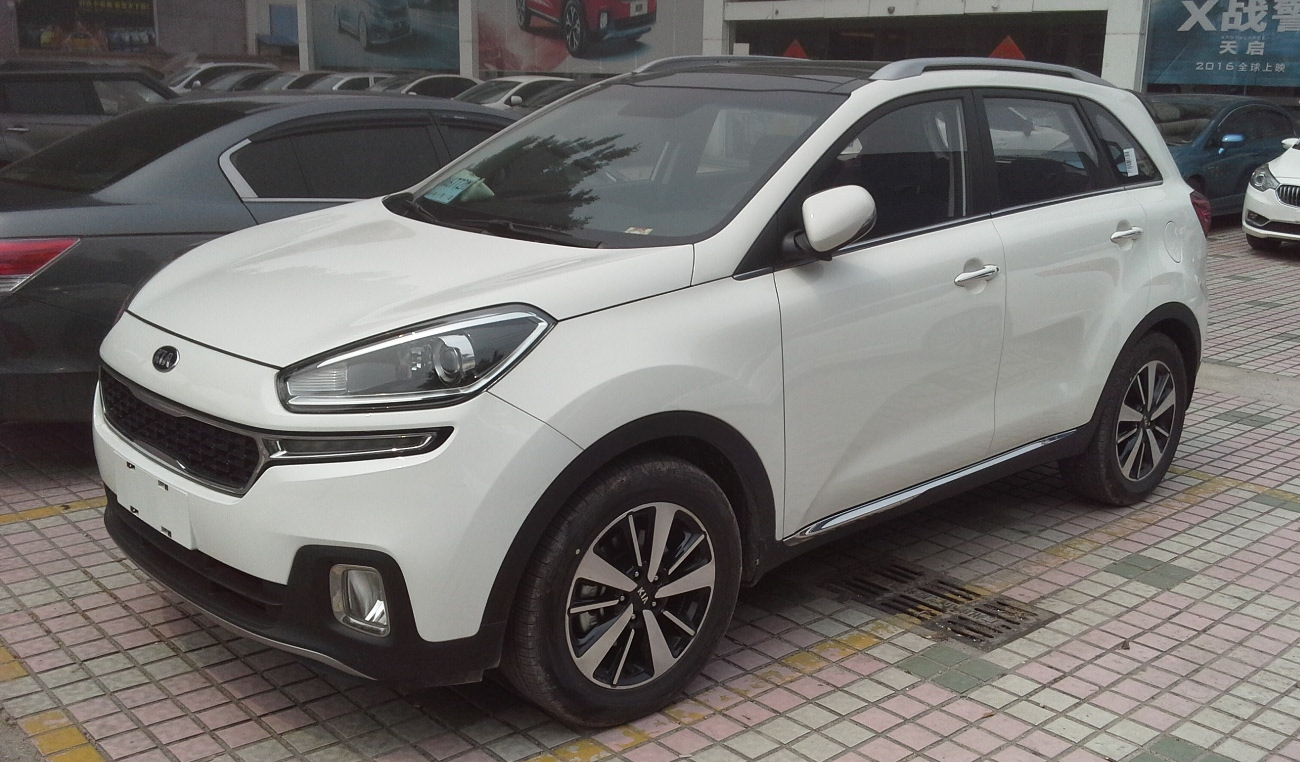
- Kia KX3 pre-facelift front

Overview
- Model code: KC
- Production: 2015–2019

Body and chassis
- Layout: Front-engine, front-wheel-drive; Front-engine, all-wheel-drive
- Related: Hyundai ix25 (GC)

Powertrain
- Engine: 1.6 L Gamma MPi I4 (petrol); 1.6 L Gamma T-GDi I4 (petrol); 2.0 L Nu MPi I4 (petrol)
- Transmission: 6-speed manual; 6-speed automatic; 7-speed DCT

Dimensions
- Wheelbase: 2,590 mm (102.0 in)
- Length: 4,270 mm (168.1 in)
- Width: 1,780 mm (70.1 in)
- Height: 1,630 mm (64.2 in)

The KX3 debuted as a concept on the 2014 Guangzhou Auto Show, while the production version made its debut in March 2015.

The KX3 is based on the platform of the Hyundai ix25 and has engine options including a 1.6 liter inline-4 engine with 123 hp and 151 nm, a 1.6 liter inline-4 turbo engine with 200 hp and 264 nm, and a 2.0 liter inline-4 engine with 202 hp and 192 nm. All 1.6 liter engine models are front-wheel-drive with only the 2.0 liter engine models offering optional all-wheel-drive. Transmission options are 6-speed manual gearbox or 6-speed automatic gearbox for the non-turbo models and a 7-speed DCT for the 1.6 liter turbo engine model. Pricing for the Kia KX3 Ao Pao ranges from 112,800 yuan to 186,800 yuan ($18,018 – 29,830). The facelifted Kia KX3 was launched on the 2016 Chengdu Auto Show in China with updates to the front and rear bumper designs.

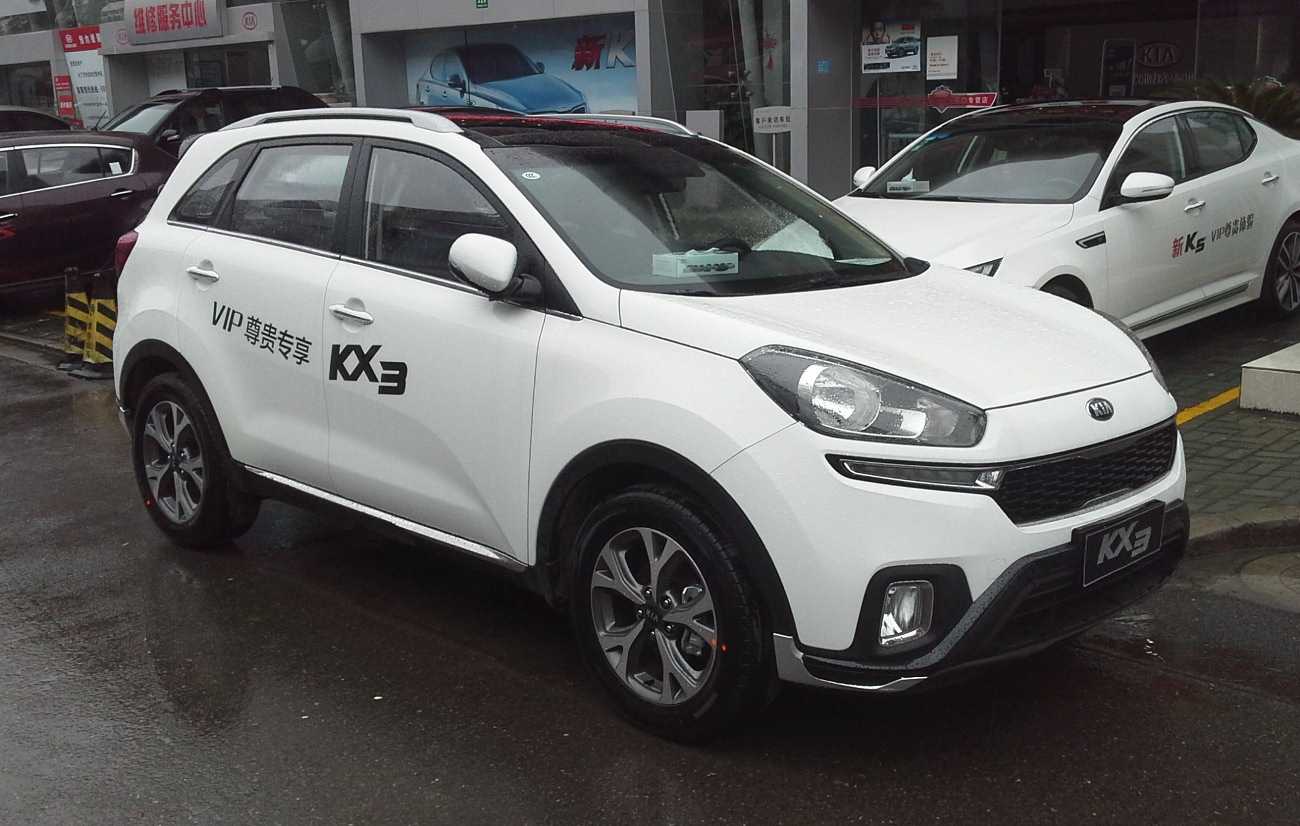
Kia KX3 pre-facelift front

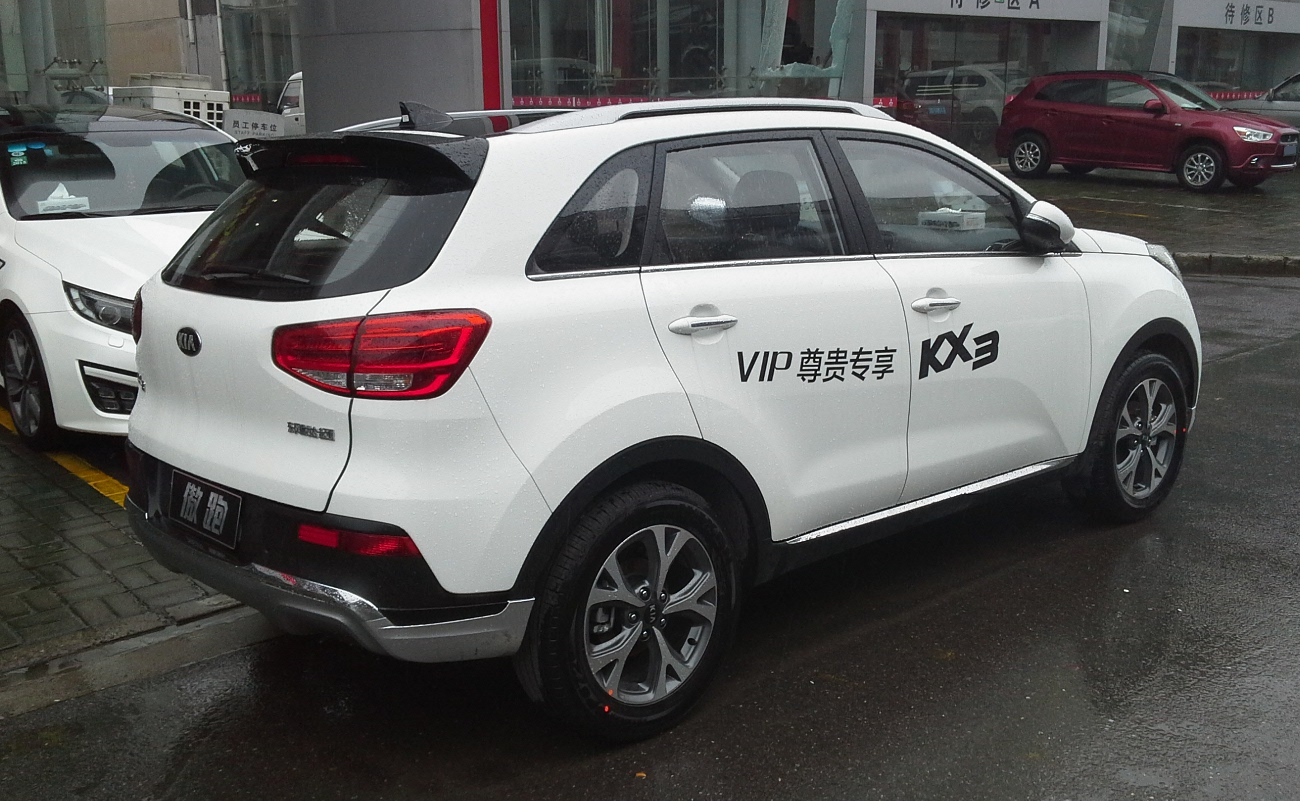
Kia KX3 pre-facelift rear

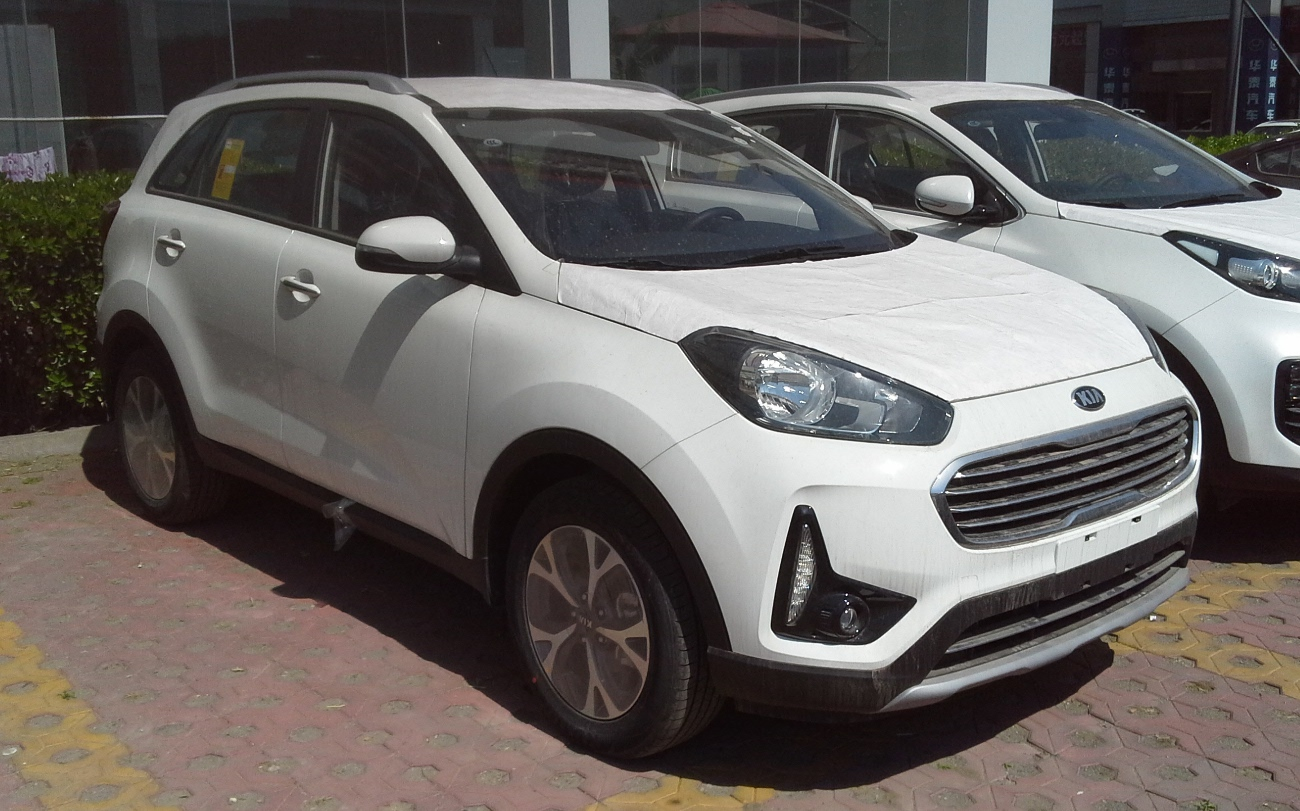
Kia KX3 facelift front

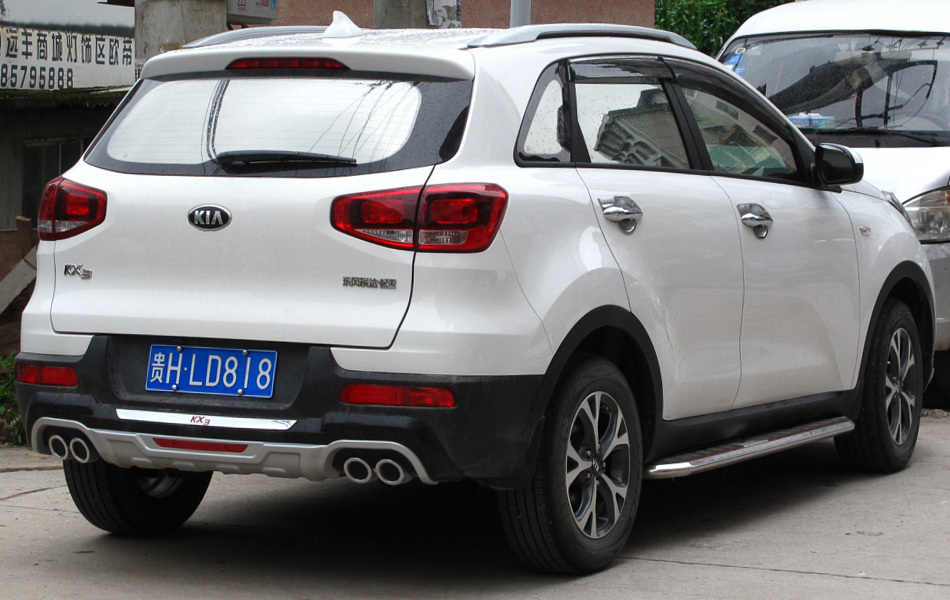
Kia KX3 facelift rear

=== KX3 EV ===
The Kia KX3 EV was launched in China in 2018 with prices starting at 239,800.00 ¥ before incentives. The KX3 EV was produced by Dongfeng Yueda Kia, and the drivetrain produces 81 kW (109 hp) power, and 285 N.m/ 210 lb.ft of torque. The top speed of the 2018 Yueda Kia KX3 EV is 150 km/h / 94 mph, with the NEDC energy consumption being 16.4 kWh/100 km.

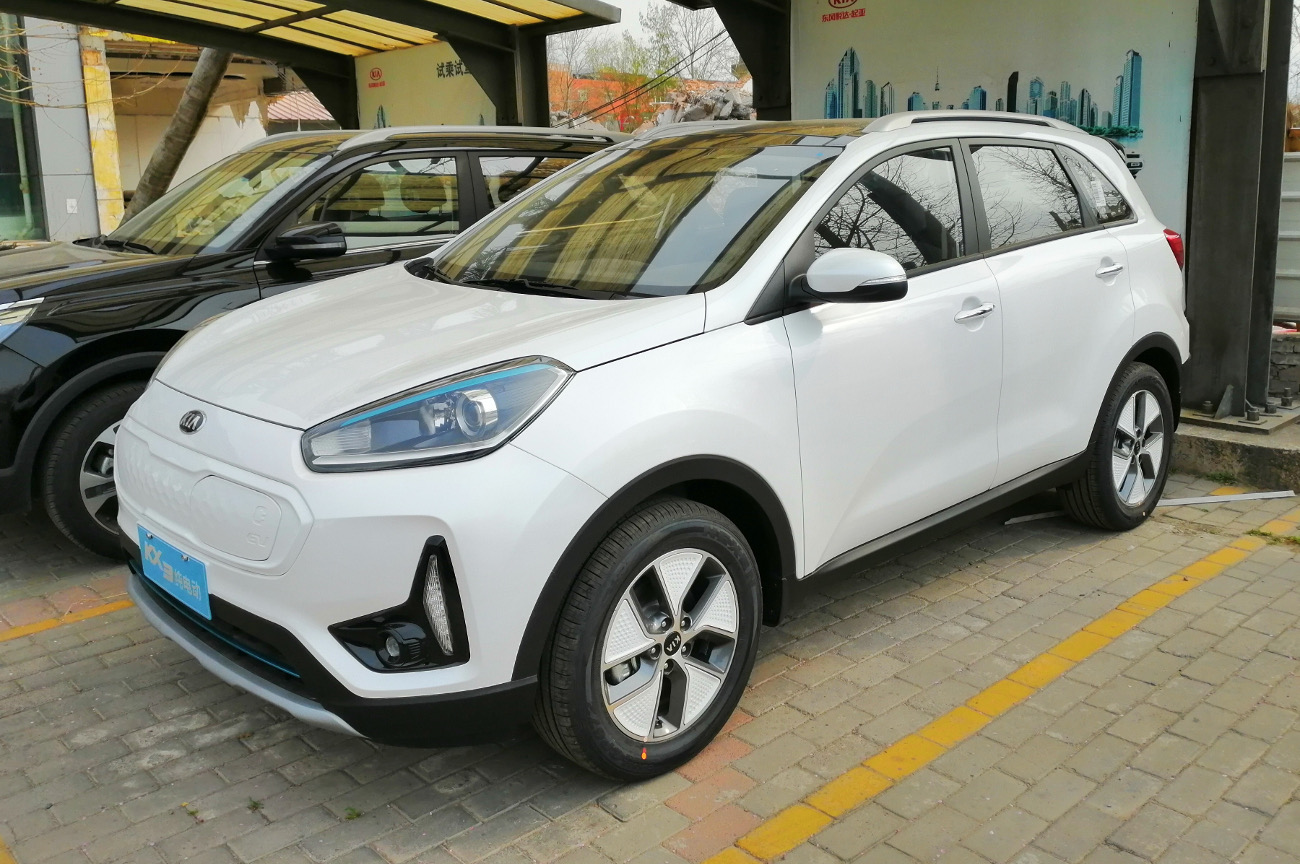
Kia KX3 EV front

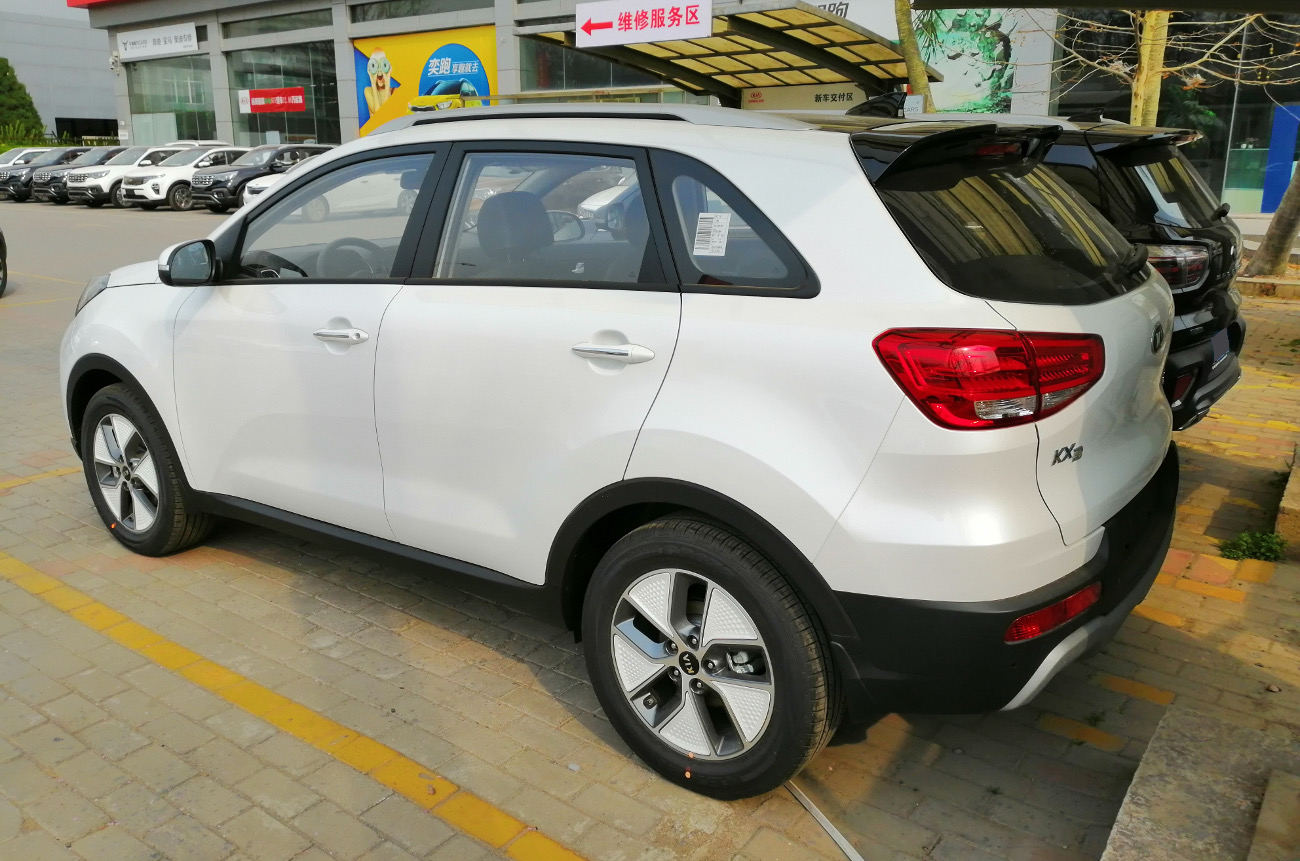
Kia KX3 EV rear

== Second generation (SP2c; 2020) ==
Second generation
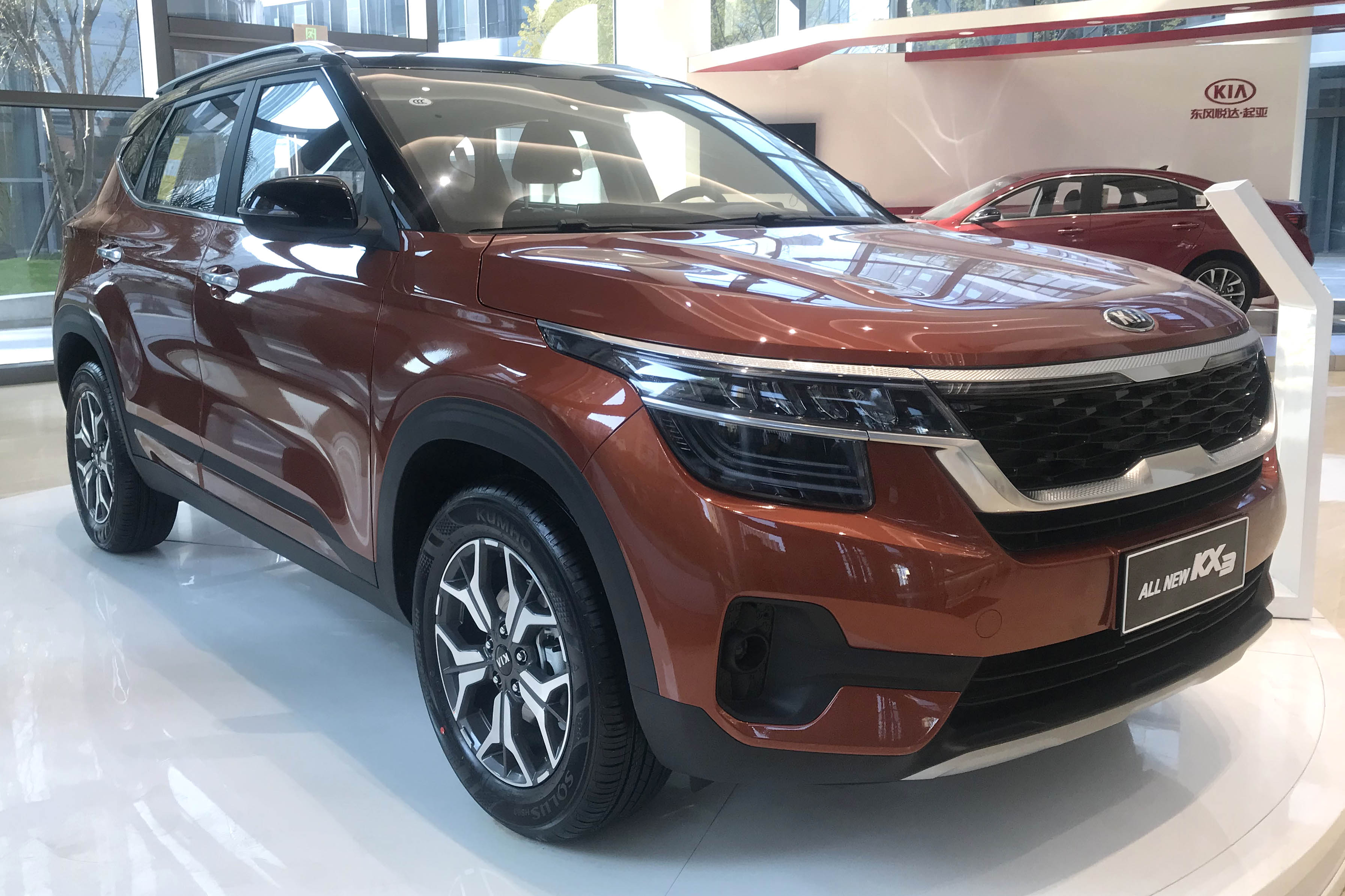

Overview
- Model code: SP2c
- Also called: Kia Seltos
- Production: 2019–2023
- Designer: Byung Chul-juh

Body and chassis
- Layout: Front-engine, front-wheel-drive
- Related: Hyundai ix25 (SU2)

Powertrain
- Engine: 1.5 L Smartstream G1.5 MPI I4 (petrol)
- Transmission: CVT

Dimensions
- Wheelbase: 2,650 mm (104.3 in)
- Length: 4,345 mm (171.1 in)
- Width: 1,800 mm (70.9 in)
- Height: 1,645 mm (64.8 in)

In September 2019, Dongfeng Yueda Kia unveiled the Seltos as the second generation KX3 with an additional Chinese name, Aopao (傲跑). The second generation KX3 was available in the Chinese market in December 2019. In terms of power, the second generation KX3 is equipped with the G4FL 1.5-liter naturally aspirated engine producing 115 hp.

Unlike the previous generations, the second-generation Kia KX3 Aopao does not offer all-wheel drive since it is shares the platform with the Indian-sourced SP2i Seltos.

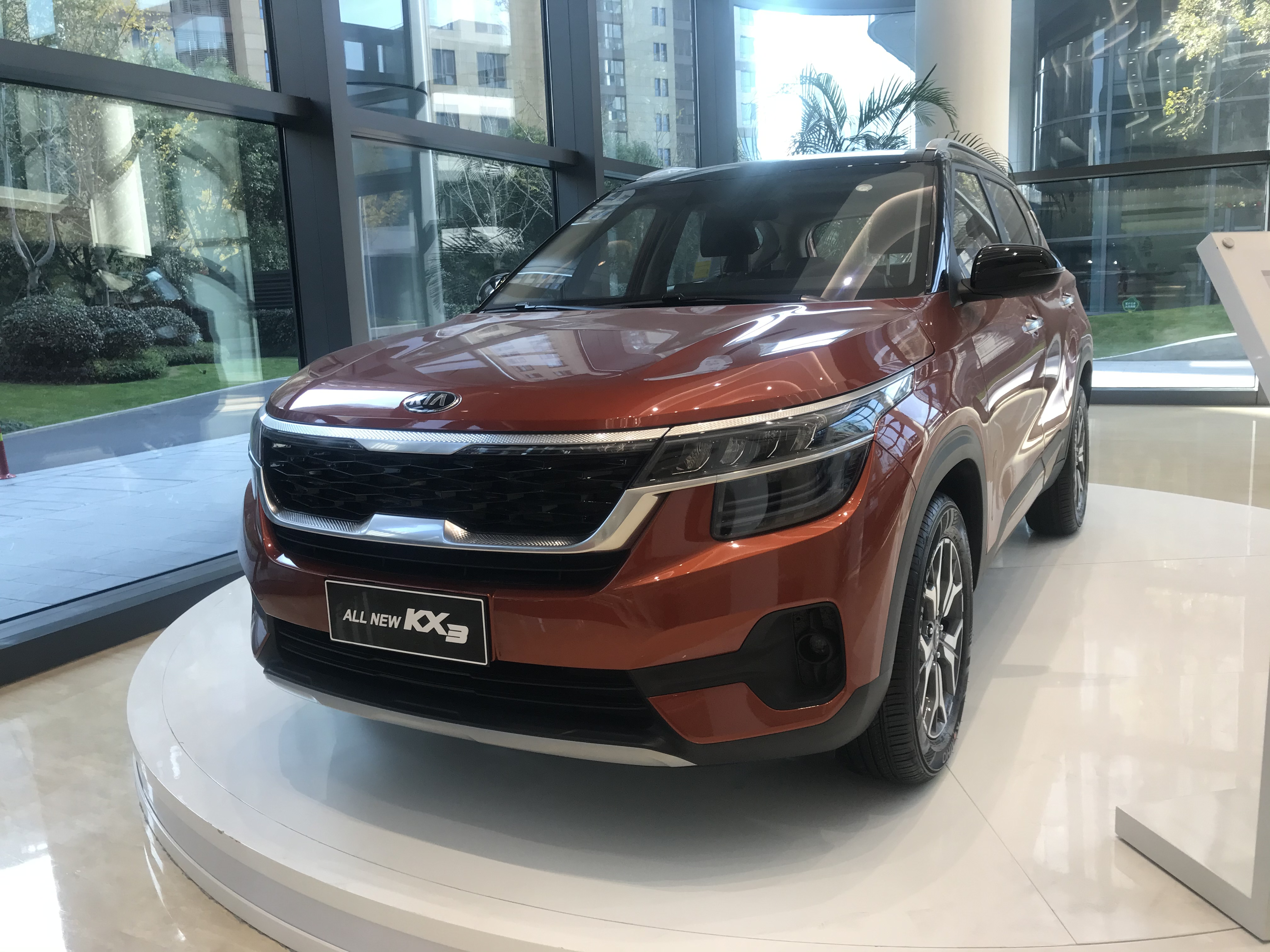
Kia KX3 pre-facelift front

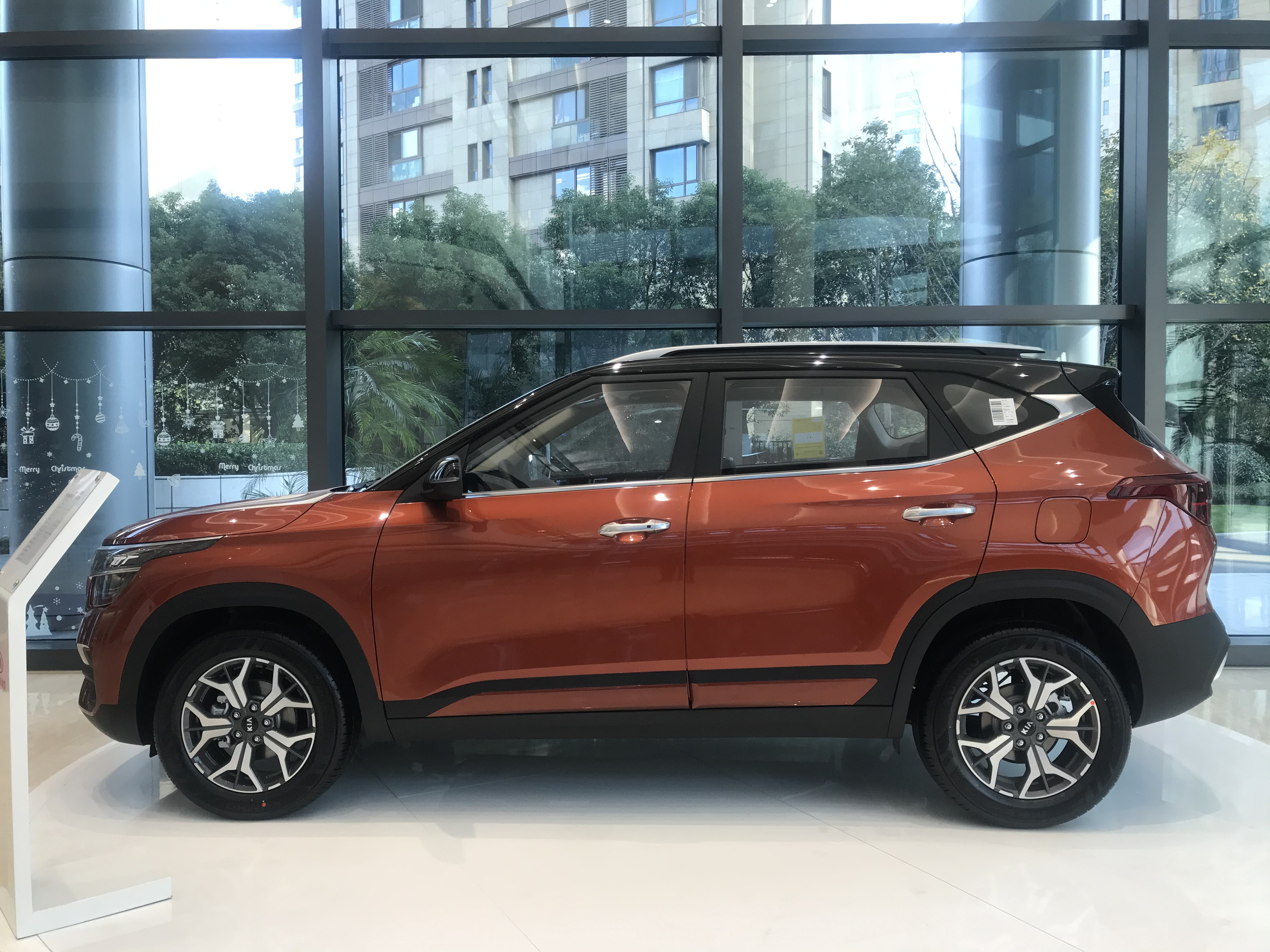
Kia KX3 Aopao side

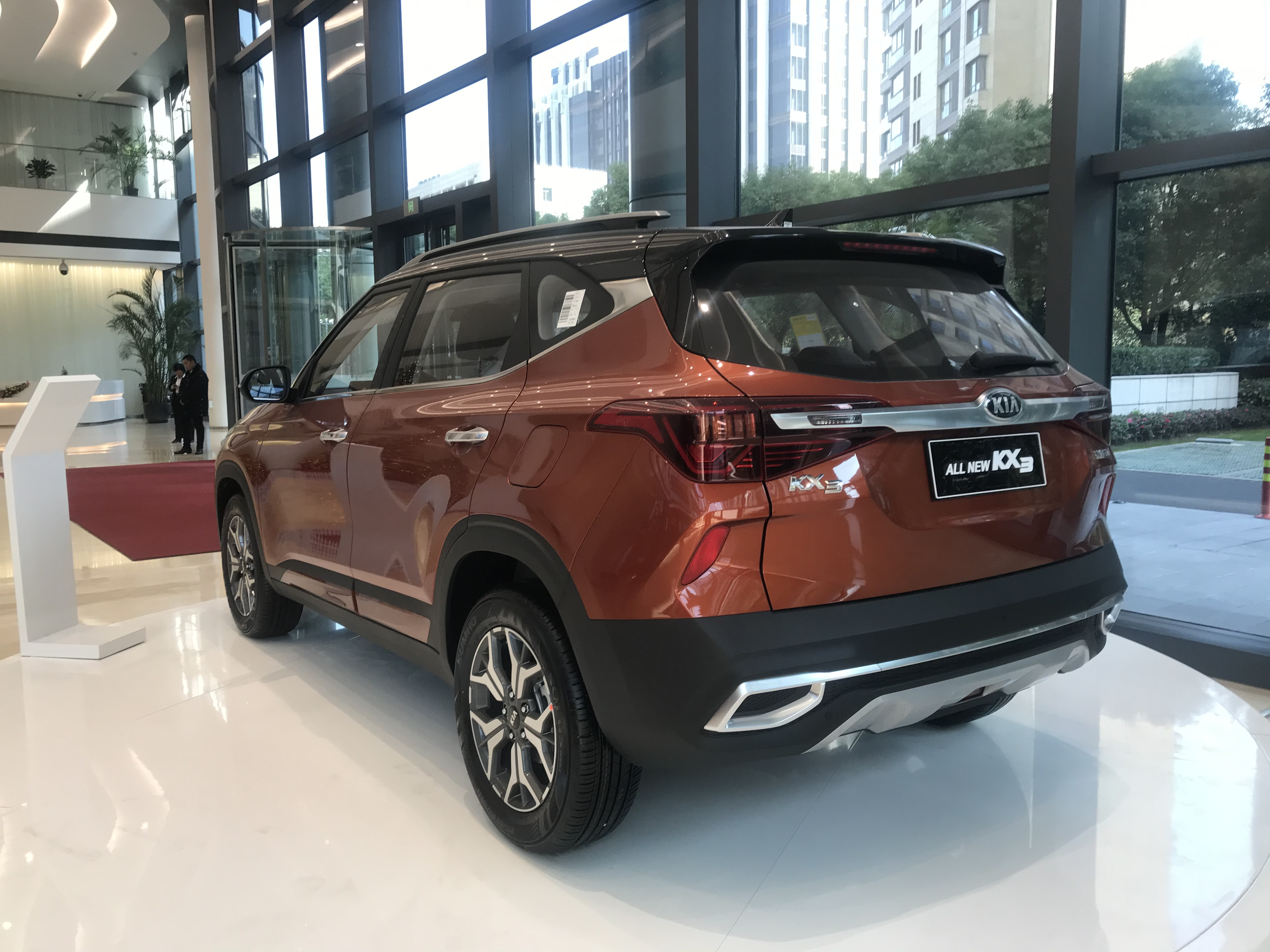
Kia KX3 Aopao rear
