= Kia Forte =

Compact car produced by Kia (2008-2024)

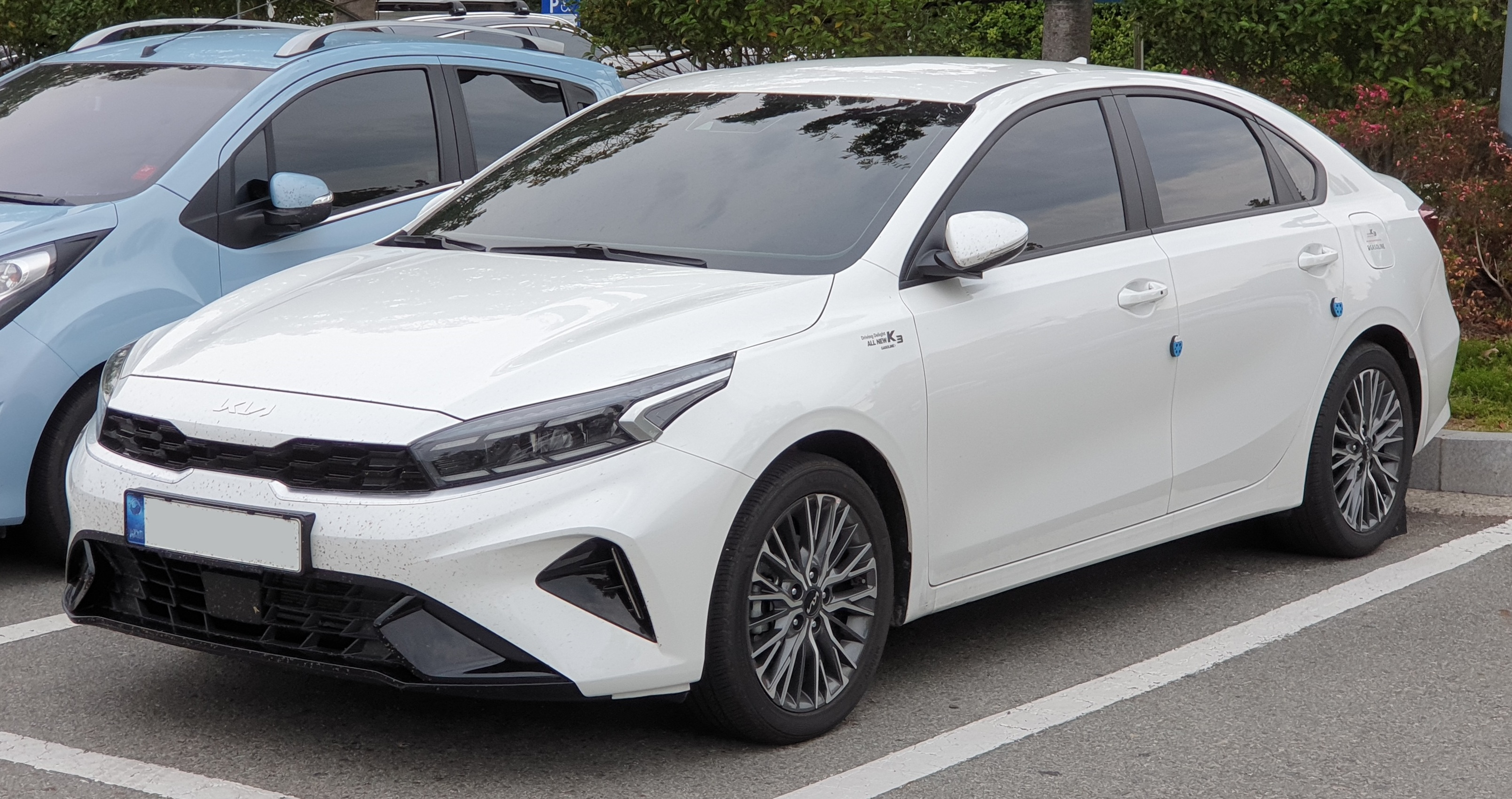

Overview
- Manufacturer: Kia
- Also called: Kia Cerato; Kia K3 (South Korea and China)
- Production: 2008–2024

Body and chassis
- Class: Compact car (C)
- Layout: Front-engine, front-wheel-drive
- Related: Kia Ceed; Hyundai Avante/Elantra

Chronology
- Predecessor: Kia Cerato (2003–2008); Kia Spectra
- Successor: Kia K4

The Kia Forte (Korean: 기아 포르테), known as the K3 in Asia, the Forte K3 or Shuma in China, and the Cerato in South America, Australia, New Zealand, and Russia, is a compact car manufactured by South Korean automaker Kia, produced from 2008 to 2024, replacing the Kia Spectra.

Throughout its production, the Forte was available in two-door coupe, four-door sedan, and five-door hatchback body styles. It was not sold in Europe, where the similarly sized Kia Ceed was offered instead, except in Russia and Ukraine, where both the Ceed and Forte were sold concurrently.

In some markets, such as Korea, Australia and Brazil, the Forte is marketed as Kia Cerato, replacing its predecessor of the same name. In Colombia and Singapore, the name Cerato Forte was used for the second generation, while Naza Automotive Manufacturing of Malaysia has assembled the vehicle since 2009, selling it there under the name Naza Forte.

Production of the Forte ended in 2024, and it was replaced by the K4, as Kia realigned their passenger car nomenclature, with the K3 name being transferred to a subcompact car replacing the Kia Rio.

== First generation (TD; 2008) ==
First generation
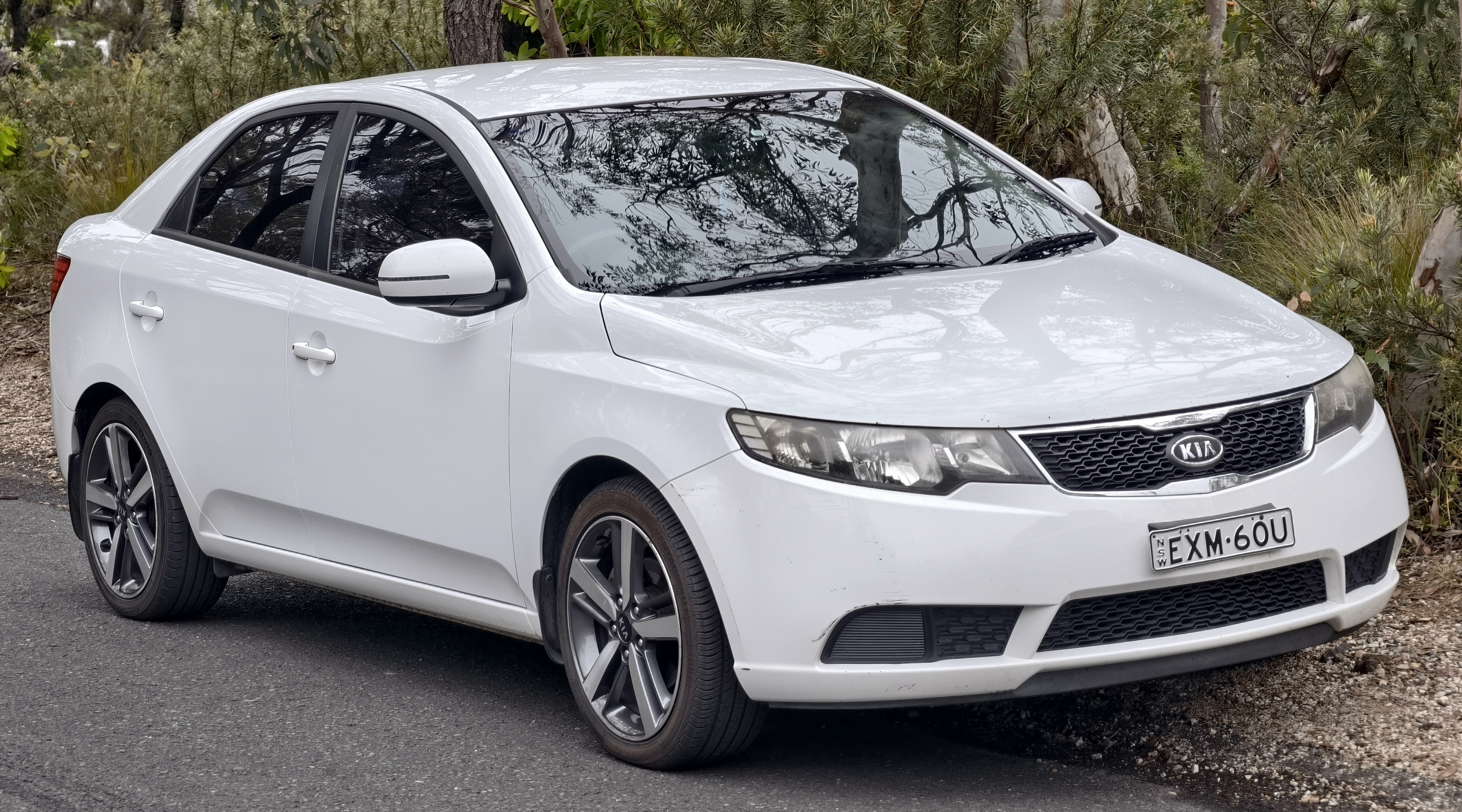

Overview
- Model code: TD
- Also called: Kia Cerato; Naza Forte (Malaysia); Kia Shuma (China; Koup); Kia Koup (Chile)
- Production: 2008–2012; 2009–2017 (China); 2013–2020 (Iran)
- Model years: 2010–2013 (North America); 2011–2013 (Forte5)
- Assembly: South Korea: Hwaseong (Hwaseong Plant); China: Yancheng (Yancheng Plant) (DYK); Ecuador: Quito (AYMESA); Iran: Tehran (SAIPA); Kazakhstan: Oskemen Malaysia: Gurun (NAM); Russia: Kaliningrad (Avtotor); Vietnam: Chu Lai (THACO Kia)
- Designer: Kurt Kahls (2006); Tom Kearns (2006)

Body and chassis
- Body style: 2-door coupé; 4-door sedan; 5-door hatchback
- Related: Hyundai Avante/Elantra (HD)

Powertrain
- Engine: 1.6 L Gamma MPi CVVT I4 (petrol); 2.0 L Theta II MPi I4 (petrol); 2.4 L Theta II MPi I4 (petrol); 1.6 L Gamma LPi I4 (petrol/LPG); 1.6 L U II CRDi-VGT I4 (diesel)
- Transmission: 5/6-speed manual; 4/5/6-speed automatic

Dimensions
- Wheelbase: 2,650 mm (104.3 in)
- Length: 4,480 mm (176.4 in) (coupe); 4,530 mm (178.3 in) (sedan); 4,340 mm (170.9 in) (hatchback)
- Width: 1,765 mm (69.5 in) (coupe); 1,775 mm (69.9 in) (sedan, hatch)
- Height: 1,400 mm (55.1 in) (coupe); 1,460 mm (57.5 in) (sedan, hatch)

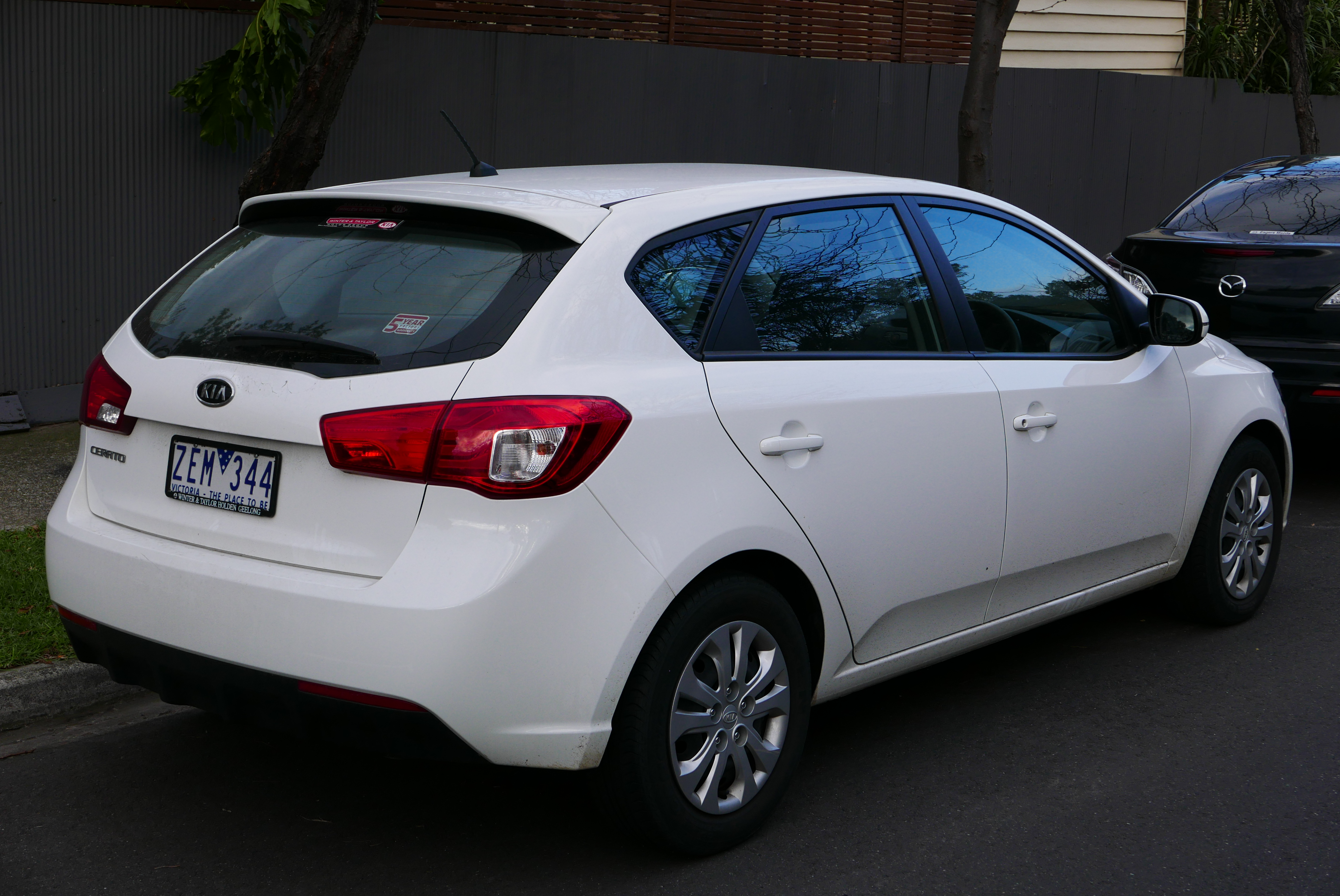
Hatchback

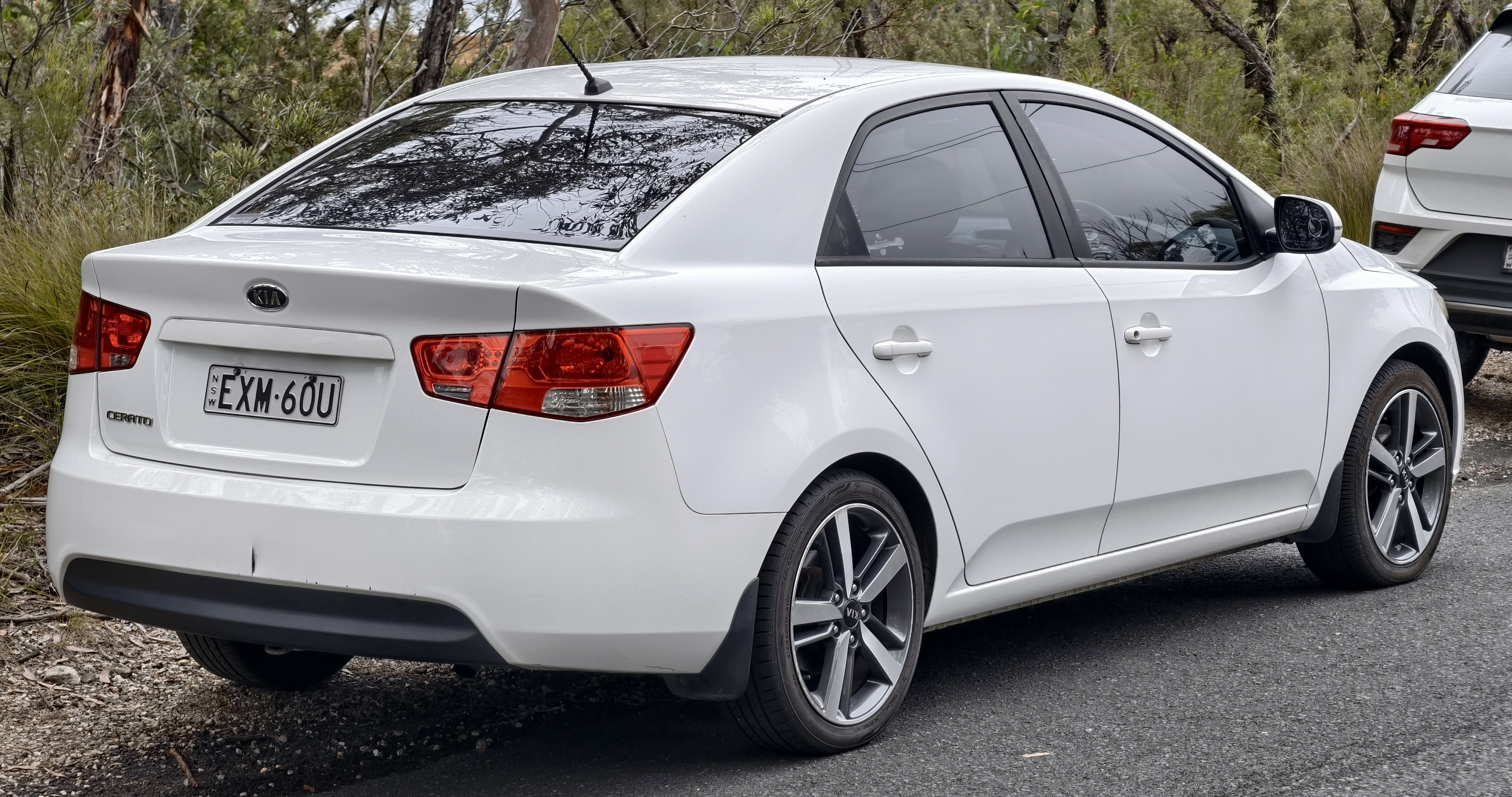
Sedan

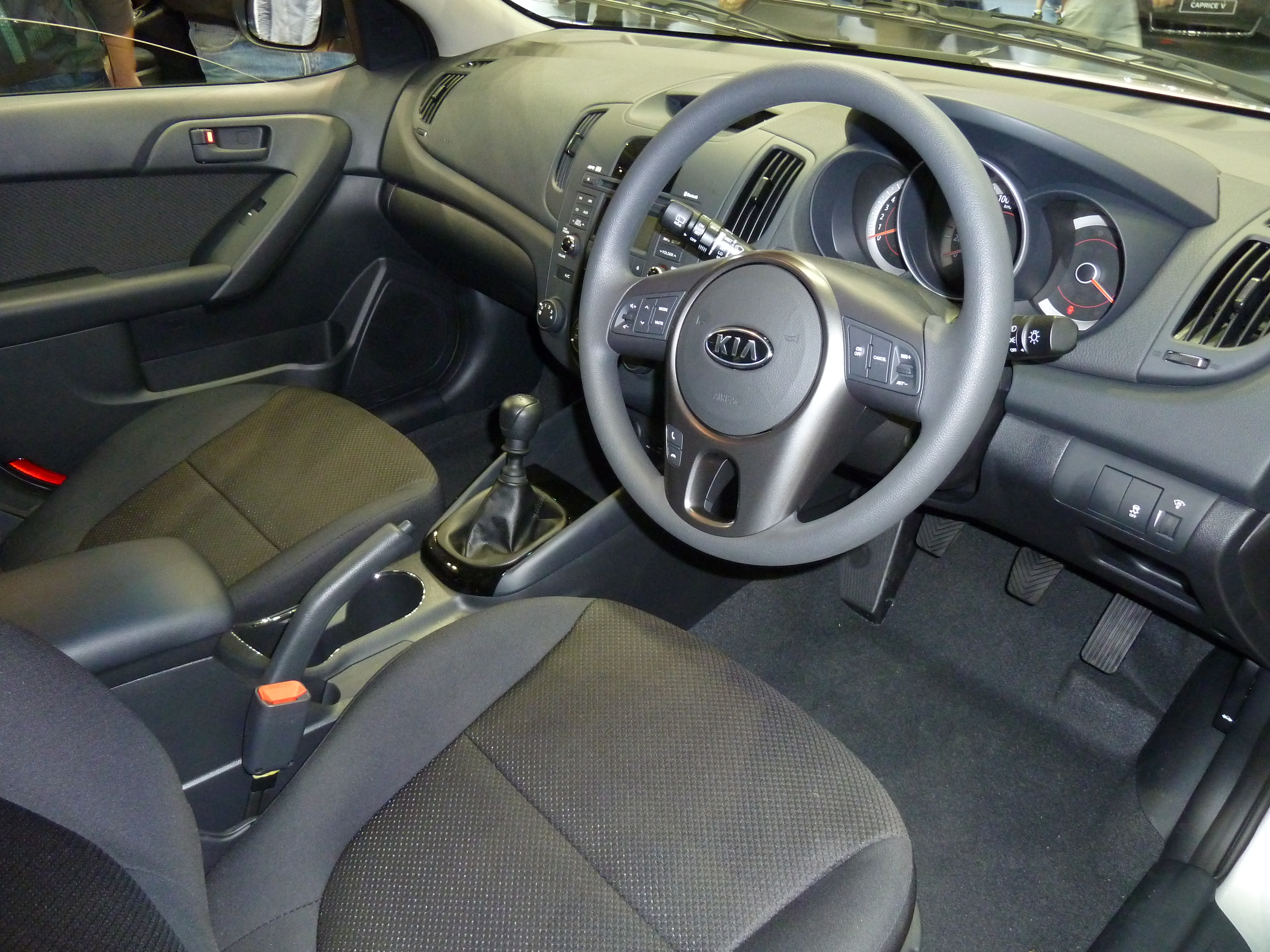
Interior

The first generation Forte was introduced in 2008. In North America, the Forte replaced the Kia Spectra, while the Forte retained the Cerato name in numerous markets. It shares the same platform as the Hyundai Avante/Elantra (HD), though employing a torsion-beam rear suspension in place of the Elantra's multilink design. Kia has stated that the Forte was specifically designed to target younger buyers attracted to sharper auto designs.

Succeeding the first generation Cerato or second generation Spectra, several elements of the interior and suspension were changed. The car received a wider (4 cm) and longer (3 cm) body, a longer (4 cm) wheelbase and a wider (7 cm) gauge. However, ground clearance was reduced by a centimeter, thereby reducing the height by a centimeter. At the same time, the design of the rear suspension was simplified, which instead of independent multilink thrust became semi-dependent double-lever, with an elastic beam, which made it more reliable and easy to repair and maintain.

Three body styles were introduced; the compact 4-door sedan, 5-door hatchback, and 2-door coupe body style.

=== Sedan ===
The Forte sedan was designed in Kia's California design studio by Tom Kearns and his team. The Forte two-door ("Koup") was previewed as the "Kia Koup" Concept, and was also designed in Kia's California design studio. The Korean model went on sale on 22 August 2008. The US model was unveiled at the 2009 Chicago Auto Show.

=== Hatchback ===
The Forte five-door hatchback debuted at the 2010 New York International Auto Show.

=== Coupe (Koup) ===
The two-door coupe "Forte Koup" was originally unveiled as a concept car in the form of the "Kia Koup" on 20 March 2008 at the New York International Auto Show. The concept sported a twin scroll turbocharged version of the 2.0-litre Theta II inline-four engine. The production Forte Koup is badged as the "Kia Cerato Koup" in Australia, Costa Rica, Russia and South Africa. It is called the "Kia Shuma" in China, and "Kia Koup" in Chile.

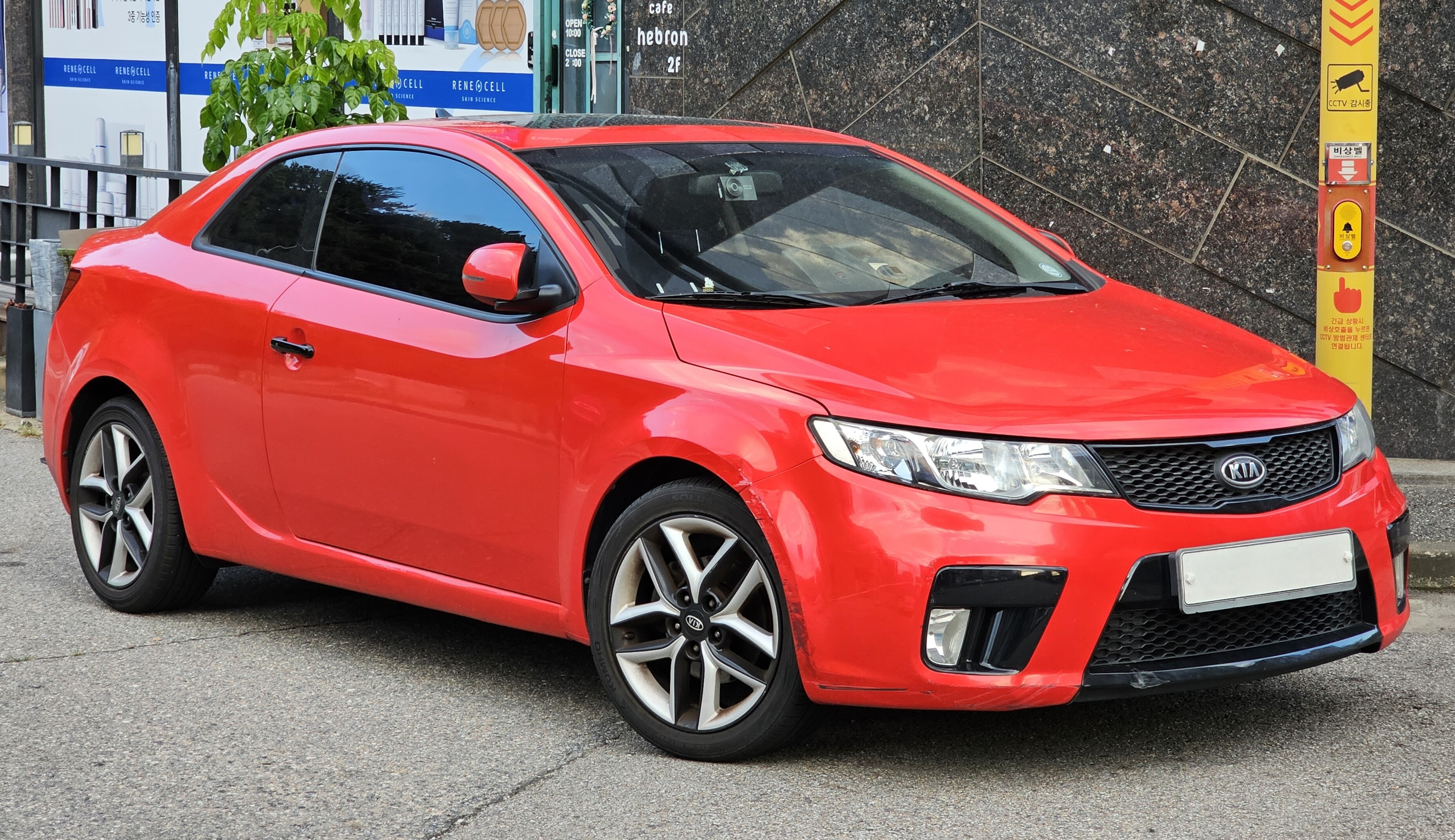
Kia Forte Koup (South Korea)

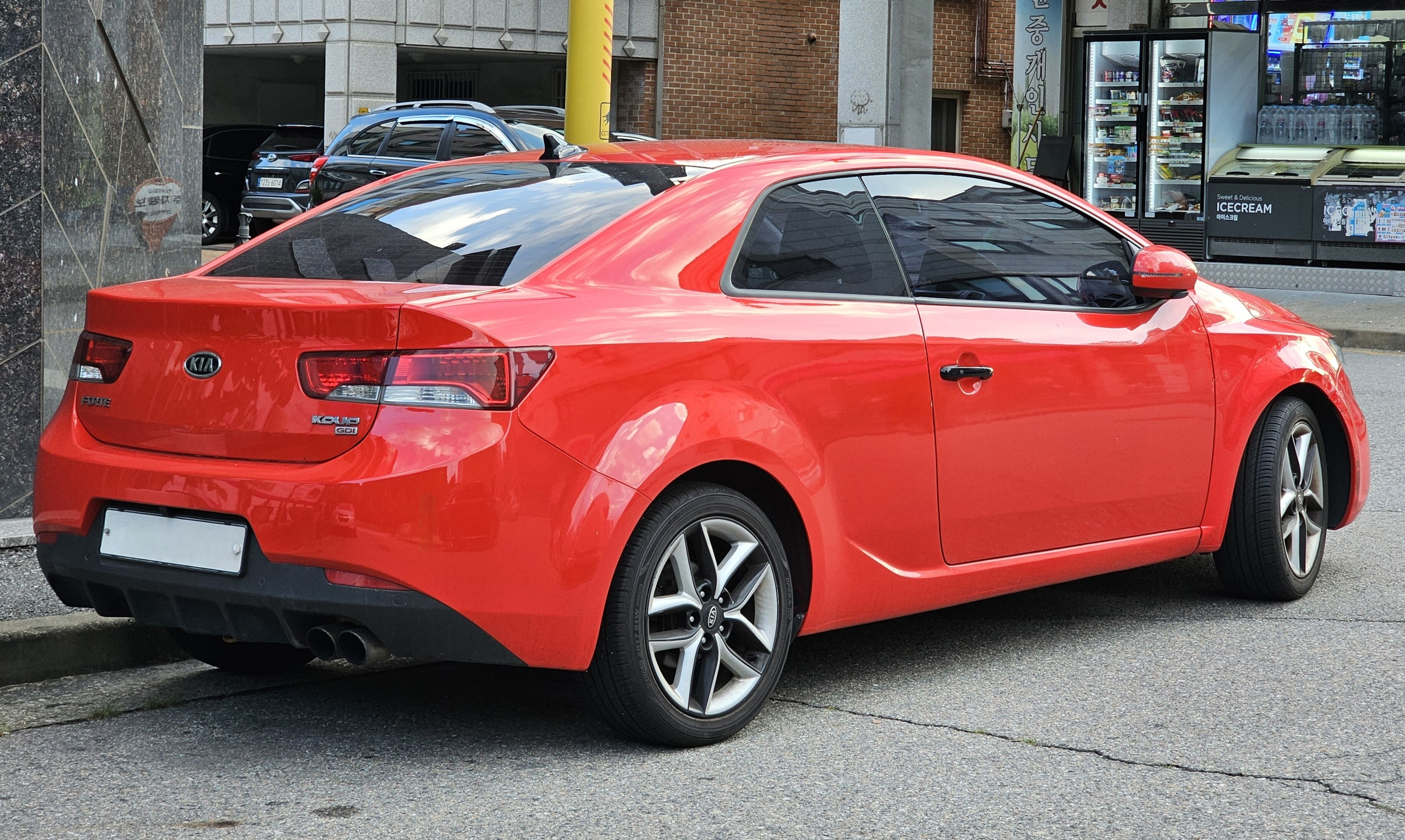
Kia Forte Koup (South Korea)

=== LPI Hybrid ===
In 2009, Kia unveiled the mild hybrid Forte at the Seoul Motor Show for the South Korean market. Taking its underpinnings from the Hyundai Elantra LPI Hybrid, the car is powered by liquefied petroleum gas (LPG). It is powered with an 85-kilowatt (114 hp) 1.6-litre LPG engine coupled with a 15-kilowatt (20 hp) electric motor and a lithium-polymer battery pack, making it the first production car to use lithium-polymer batteries.

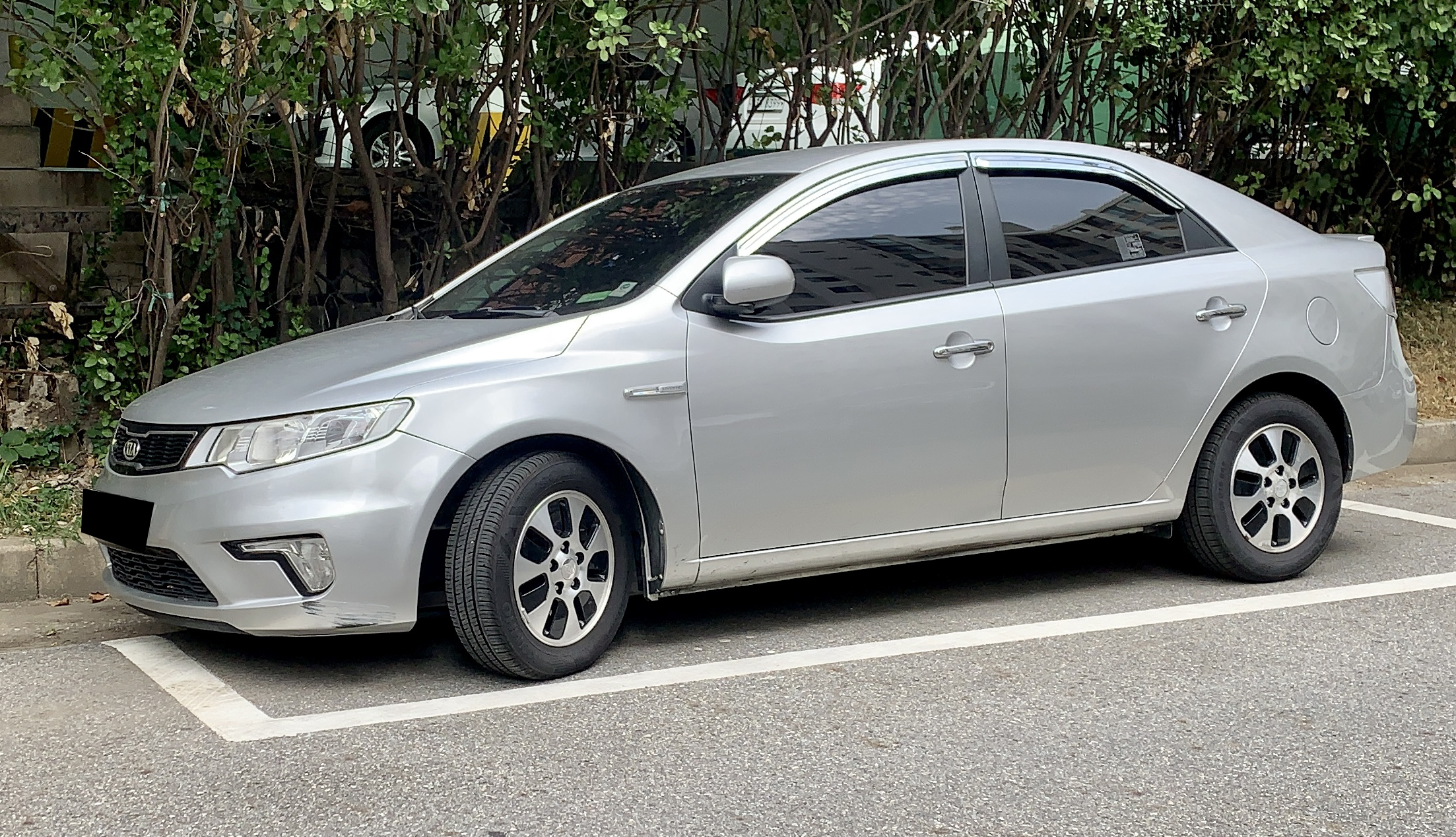
Kia Forte LPI Hybrid

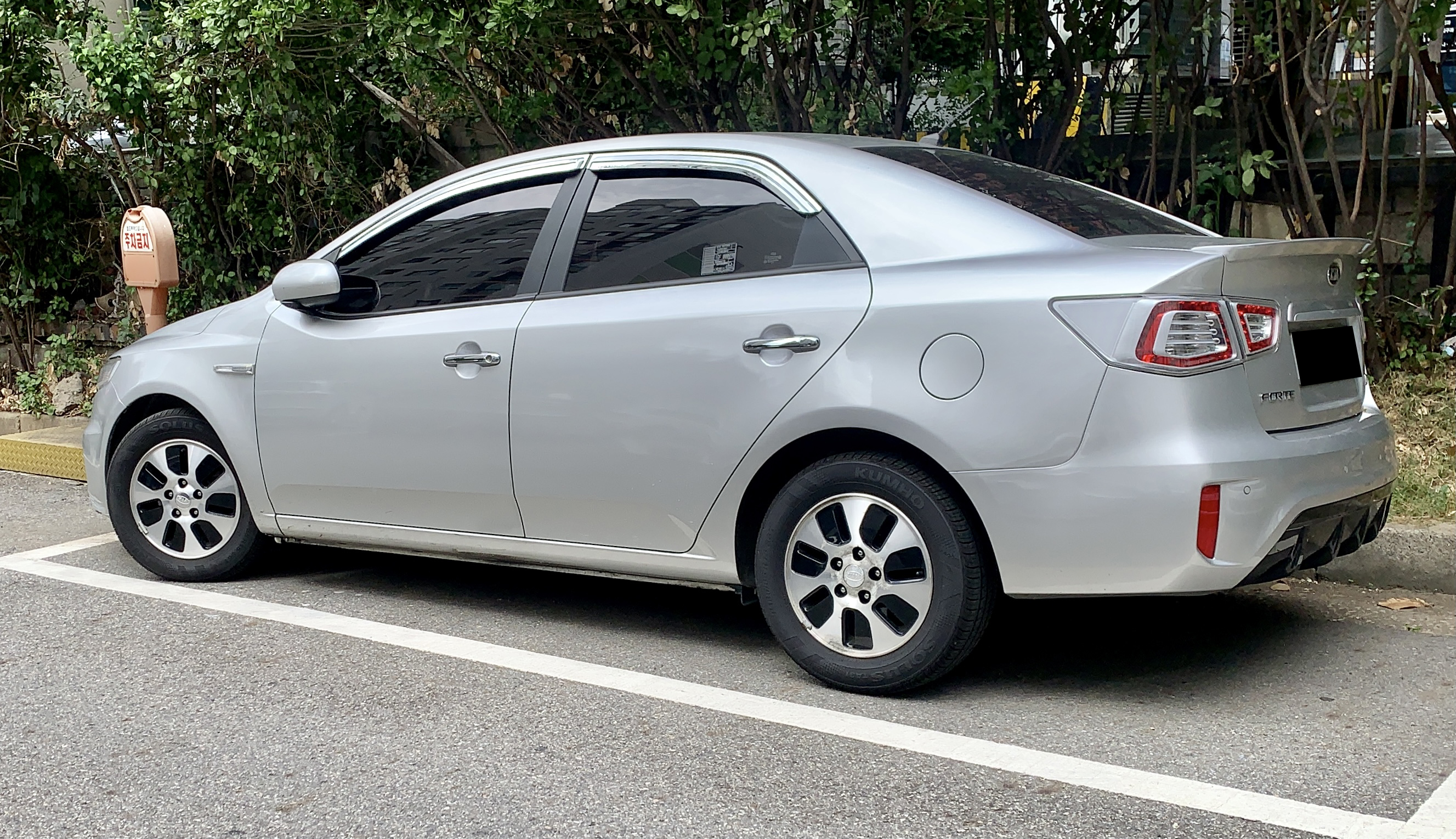
Kia Forte LPI Hybrid

=== Powertrains ===
Engine type	Displacement	Power	Torque	Transmission
1.6 L Gamma I4 (petrol)	1591 cc	128 PS (94 kW; 126 hp)	15.9 kgf⋅m (156 N⋅m; 115 lbf⋅ft)	5-speed manual, 4-speed automatic (6-speed automatic + paddle-shift as of 2011 model)
1.6 L Gamma I4 (LPG hybrid)	1591 cc			Continuously variable automatic
1.6 L CRDi VGT I4 (turbocharged diesel)	1582 cc	128 PS (94 kW; 126 hp)	26.5 kgf⋅m (260 N⋅m; 192 lbf⋅ft)	4-speed automatic
2.0 L Theta II I4 (petrol)	1998 cc	156 PS (115 kW; 154 hp)	19.8 kgf⋅m (194 N⋅m; 143 lbf⋅ft)	5 and 6- speed manual, 4-, 5-, and 6-speed automatic
2.4 L Theta II I4 (petrol)	2359 cc	173 PS (127 kW; 171 hp)	227 N⋅m (167 lbf⋅ft)	6-speed manual, 5-speed automatic

1.6 GDi Gamma II 140 PS (103 kW; 138 hp) at 6,300 rpm and 17 kg⋅m (167 N⋅m; 123 lbf⋅ft) at 4,850 rpm

=== Safety ===
The 2010 Forte received a "Top Safety Pick" rating from the Insurance Institute for Highway Safety (IIHS).

Test	Rating
Overall:	5/5 stars
Moderate overlap front:	Good
Side:	Good
Roof strength:	Good
Head restraints & seats:	Good

ANCAP test results Kia Cerato S sedan (2009)
Test	Score
Overall	4 /5 stars
Frontal offset	9.63/16
Side impact	16/16
Pole	Not Assessed
Seat belt reminders	1/3
Whiplash protection	Not Assessed
Pedestrian protection	Marginal
Electronic stability control	Optional

ANCAP test results Kia Cerato all variants (2009)
Test	Score
Overall	4 /5 stars
Frontal offset	1..13/16
Side impact	16/16
Pole	Not Assessed
Seat belt reminders	1/3
Whiplash protection	Good
Pedestrian protection	Marginal
Electronic stability control	Optional

=== Markets ===
==== North America ====
In the United States, the 2010 LX and EX included a 2.0-litre CVVT engine and a standard five-speed manual transmission, with an optional four-speed automatic or a five-speed automatic with the Fuel Economy Package. For the 2011 model year, the Forte is standard with a six-speed manual (replacing the 5 speed unit) and is available with an optional six-speed automatic, with the four- and five-speed automatics being discontinued.

The LX is the base model. It comes standard with electronic stability control (ESC), and seat- and side-mounted airbags. The standard stereo includes four speakers, AM/FM radio, CD/MP3 player, and Sirius XM Satellite Radio. An iPod-compatible USB input jack and an auxiliary port for an external music device and steering wheel mounted audio controls are also integrated with the sound system. Bluetooth handsfree technology is also standard. The second-tier EX adds air conditioning, power windows and door locks, cruise control, a six-speaker radio, a key fob with keyless entry, and turn signal indicators on the side mirrors. The SX has the 2.4-litre engine with a six-speed manual or optional five-speed automatic transmission for the 2010 model year and a six-speed from the 2011 model year. The SX also adds alloy wheels, a leather-wrapped steering wheel and shift lever, a tilting and telescoping steering column, sport-cloth seats, and a metallic finish to the interior. Later production models have soft-touch panels on the armrest and door, as well as on the dashboard. For 2011, the EX and SX sedans are automatic-only, while the base sedan and all models of the Koup and Forte5 continue to offer the choice of manual or automatic.

An optional Fuel Economy Package adds low resistance silica tires, a more efficient alternator, a five-speed automatic transmission, and aerodynamic enhancements to increase fuel efficiency. With the Fuel Economy Package, the Forte EX has a 27 mpg_{‑US} (8.7 L/100 km; 32 mpg_{‑imp}) fuel consumption in city driving and 36 mpg_{‑US} (6.5 L/100 km; 43 mpg_{‑imp}) in highway according to United States Environmental Protection Agency (EPA). Automatic transmission models include an "Eco" display on the instrument panel that tells the driver when better than expected fuel efficiency is reached, hoping to influence driving habits toward more efficient operation.

For the Forte Koup, an optional leather package is available on both EX and SX trims. When combined with the EX trim, leather is utilized for the upholstery, steering wheel and shift lever; heated front seats and a sunroof are also included with the package. When paired with the SX trim, it includes only heated leather seats and the sunroof, as a leather-wrapped steering wheel and shift lever are already fitted as standard.

The Forte sold in Canada has similar specifications and equipment as the US-market model. Some differences include the addition of power windows, door locks and power heated exterior mirrors on the base LX trim, a telescopic steering wheel on the EX trim, and a standard sunroof and automatic climate control system on the SX trim. The EX and SX also have a chrome-trimmed rear garnish and door handles. In contrast to the transmissions offered in the United States, the automatic transmission on offer in Canada is a 6-speed.

==== Asia ====
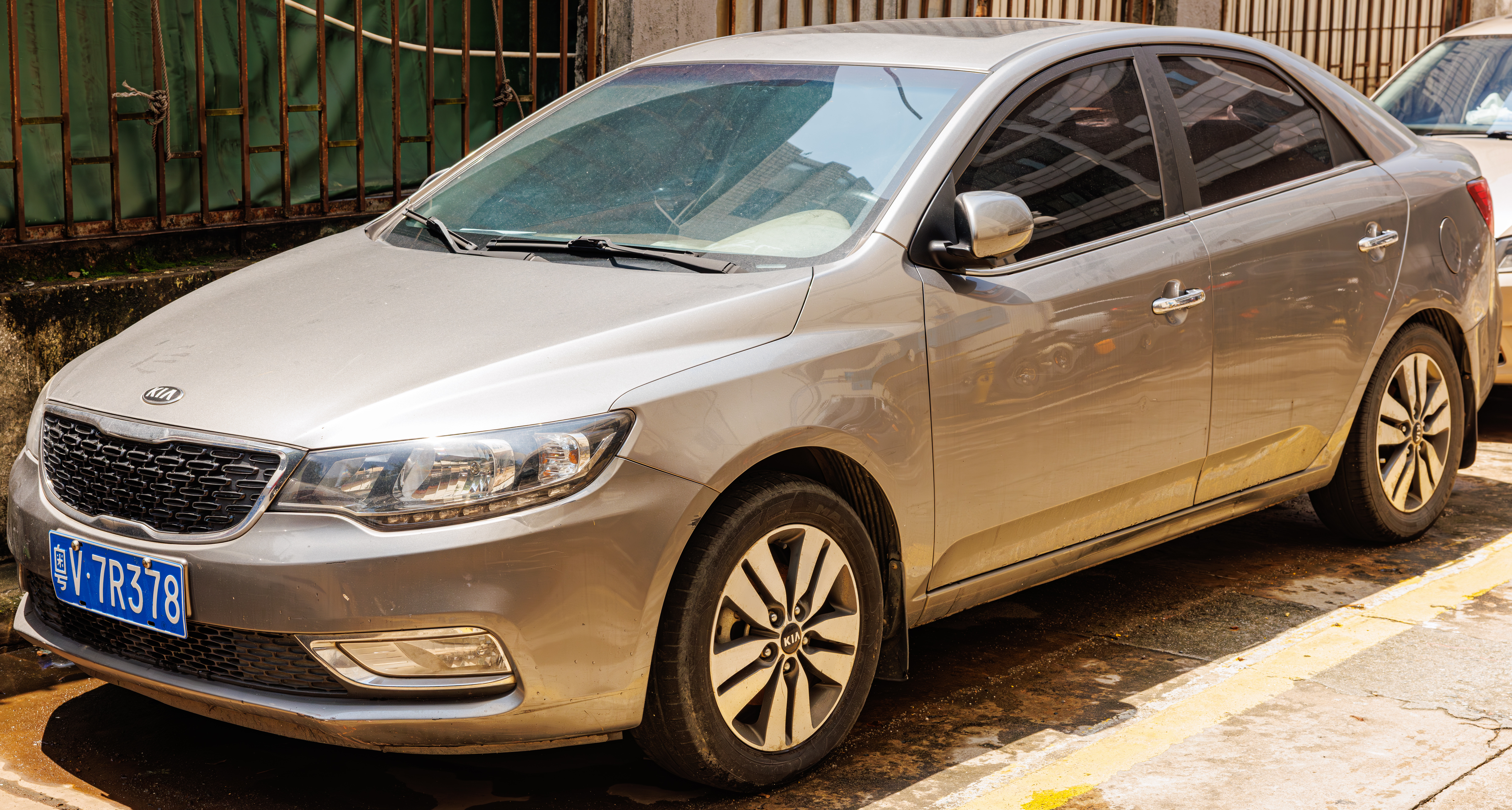

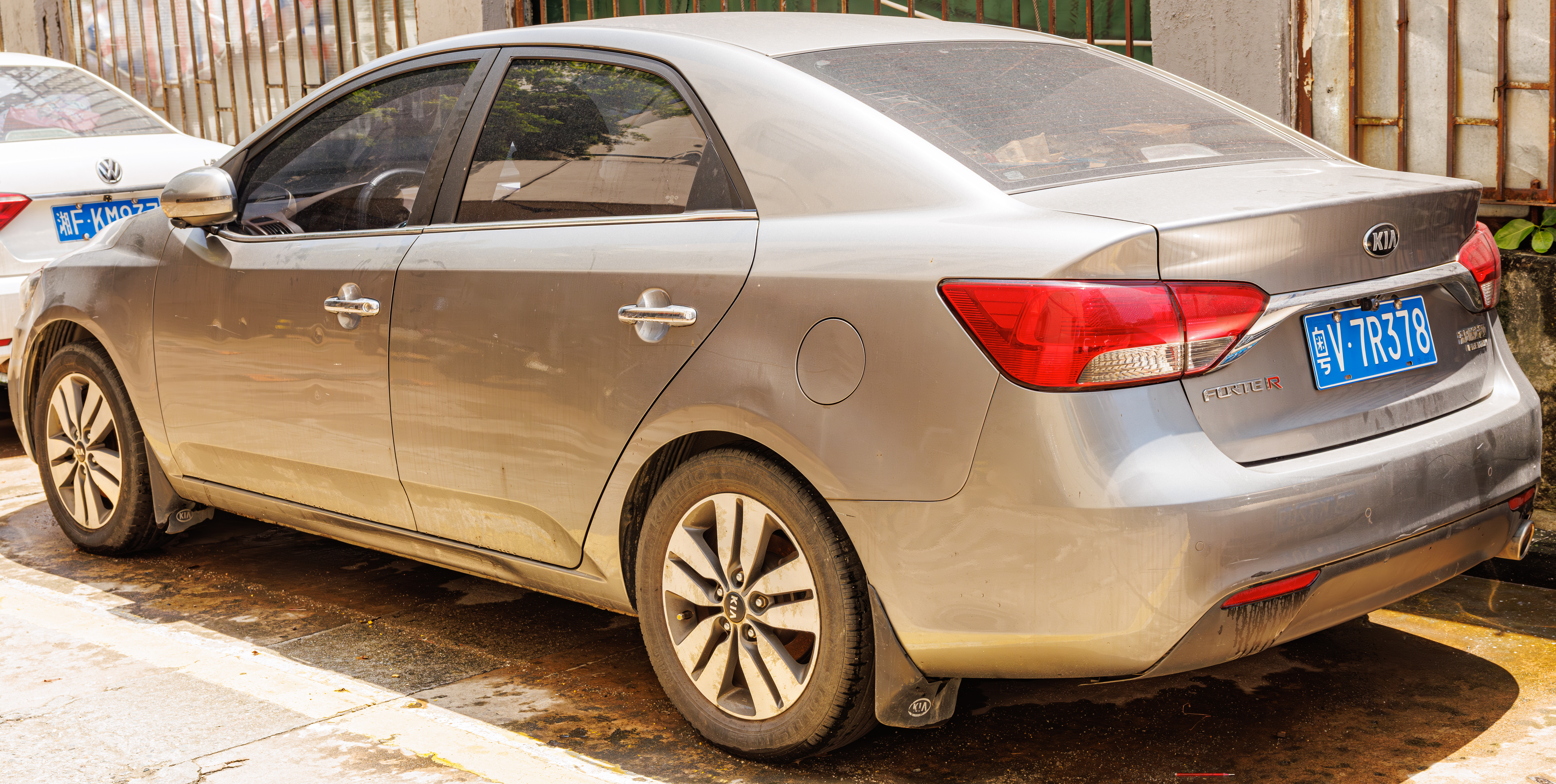
Kia Forte R (Forte Furuidi) in China

===== China =====
For the Chinese market, Kia has offered the "Forte Furuidi" (福瑞迪) or Forte (later Forte R for the facelifted model) produced by the Dongfeng Yueda Kia since 2009. The Furuidi was unveiled at the Nanjing International Expo Centre, and is available with the 1.6- Gamma and 2.0-litre Theta engines. "Furuidi" means luck and auspiciousness in the Chinese language—and has a pronunciation similar to its English name "Forte". It was sold alongside the Cerato R (First generation Cerato facelift), and later the K3 (Second generation Forte).

==== Malaysia ====
In Malaysia, the first generation Forte is assembled by the joint-venture company Naza-Kia and is called the "Naza Forte" and in Singapore, the first generation Forte was called the "Kia Cerato Forte". Both regions were offered with the 1.6-litre Gamma and 2.0-litre Theta II engine variants featuring a four-speed automatic transmission at launch, and then received a six-speed automatic transmission with paddle shifters after the 2011 facelift.

==== Europe ====
In Russia and Ukraine, the Cerato (Forte) is available as the Cee'd's notchback counterpart, with the coupe and sedan available together. The Forte is not available in other European countries, due to the relatively low popularity of small family sedans there. Despite the LPI Hybrid being launched at the 2009 Frankfurt Motor Show, the Forte is still not offered in European countries outside Russia and Ukraine.

=== Kia Forte Furuidi (China) (2017–2023) ===
Kia Forte Furuidi
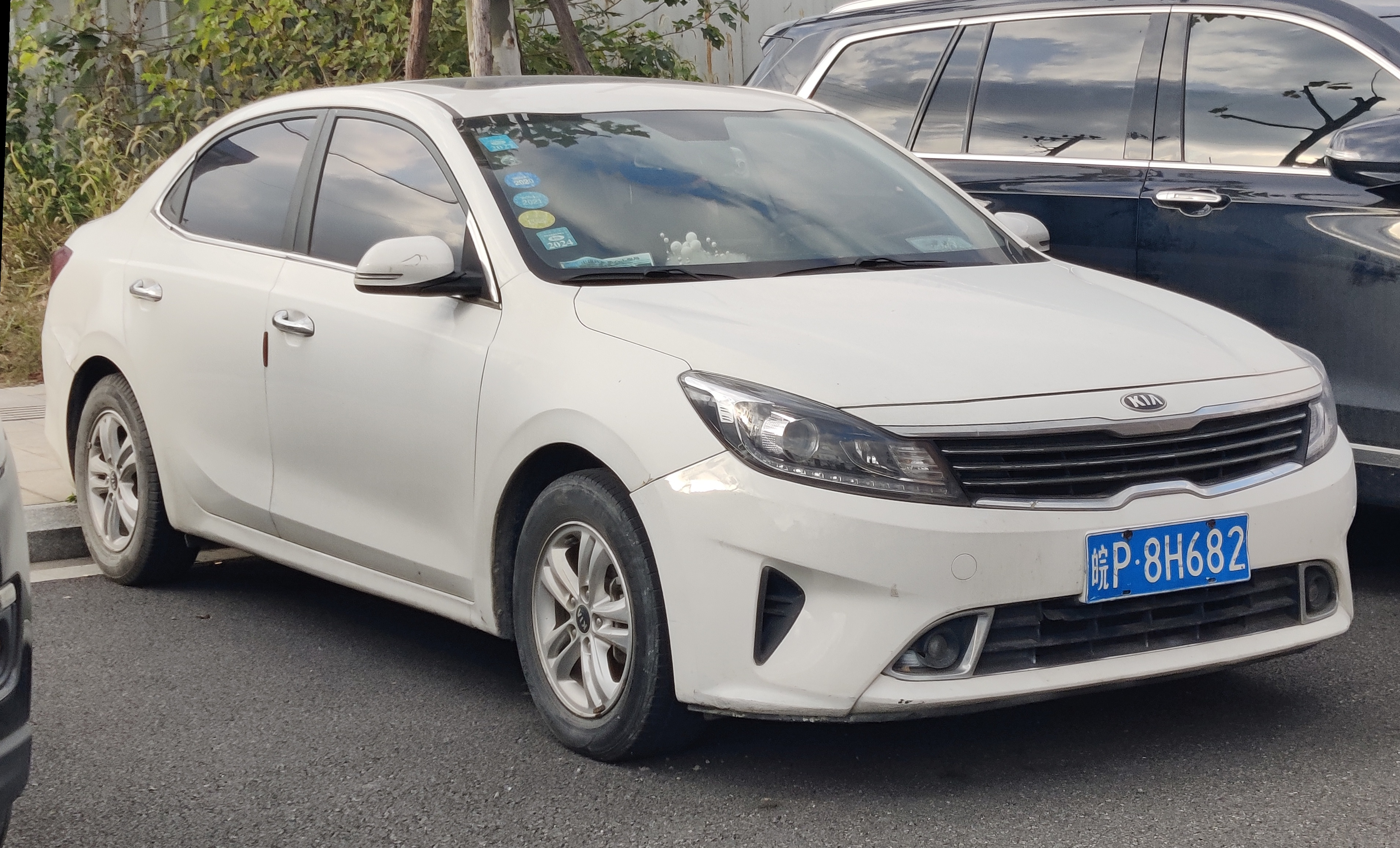

Overview
- Production: 2017–2023
- Assembly: China: Yancheng (Yancheng Plant) (DYK)

Body and chassis
- Body style: 4-door sedan
- Related: Hyundai Avante/Elantra (HD); Hyundai Celesta

Powertrain
- Engine: 1.6 L G4FG I4 (petrol)
- Transmission: 6-speed manual; 6-speed automatic

Dimensions
- Wheelbase: 2,650 mm (104.3 in)
- Length: 4,510 mm (177.6 in)
- Width: 1,750 mm (68.9 in)
- Height: 1,470 mm (57.9 in)

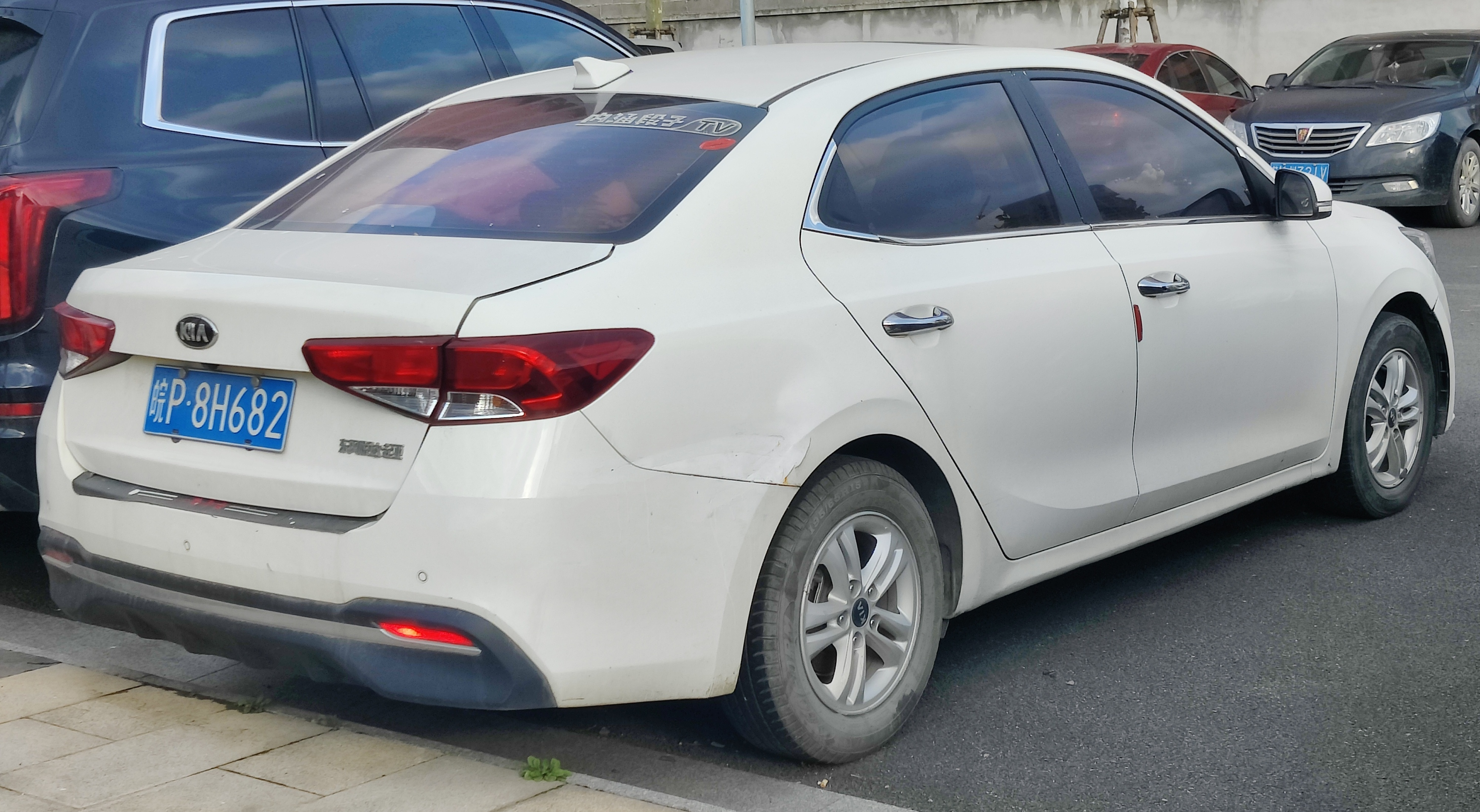
Kia Forte Furuidi rear

Derived from the Kia Forte Furuidi (福瑞迪) or Kia Forte R variant of the first generation Kia Forte facelift, Dongfeng Yueda Kia developed a succeeding Kia Forte Furuidi model with the "ND" factory code featuring a completely restyled body.

The Kia Forte Furuidi is powered by a lone 1.6 L G4FG straight-four petrol engine option developing 123 hp (90.2 kW) and 150.7Nm. Transmission is either a 6-speed automatic or 6-speed manual gearbox.

== Second generation (YD; 2012) ==
Second generation
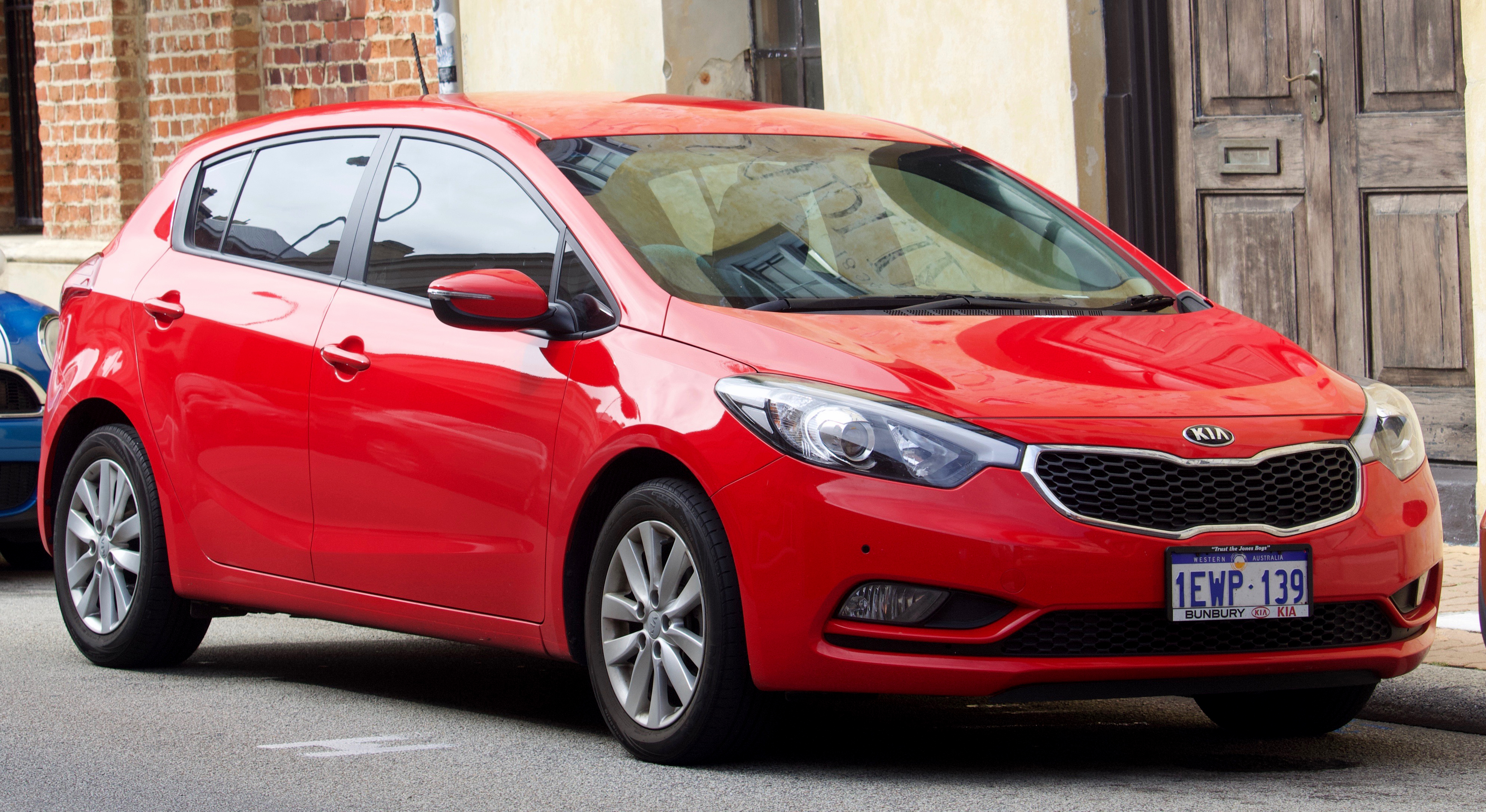

Overview
- Model code: YD
- Also called: Kia Cerato; Kia K3 (South Korea, China and Vietnam)
- Production: 2012–2018
- Model years: 2014–2018 (North America); 2017–2020 (Mexico)
- Assembly: South Korea: Hwaseong (Hwaseong Plant); Mexico: Pesquería, Nuevo León (KMMX); China: Yancheng (DYK); Malaysia: Gurun (Naza); Russia: Kaliningrad (Avtotor); Algeria: Batna (GLOVIZ); Vietnam: Chu Lai (THACO Kia)
- Designer: Kurt Kahl (2010)

Body and chassis
- Body style: 2-door coupé; 4-door sedan; 5-door hatchback
- Platform: Hyundai-Kia J5 platform
- Related: Kia Cee'd (JD); Hyundai Elantra (MD/UD); Hyundai i30 (GD)

Powertrain
- Engine: Petrol: 1.6 L Gamma MPi I4; 1.6 L Gamma GDI I4; 1.6 L Gamma turbo I4; 1.8 L Nu MPi I4; 2.0 L Nu MPi I4; 2.0 L Nu GDI I4; Diesel: 1.6 L U II CRDi I4
- Transmission: 6-speed manual; 6-speed automatic; 7-speed DCT

Dimensions
- Wheelbase: 2,700 mm (106.3 in)
- Length: 4,530 mm (178.3 in) (Koup); 4,560 mm (179.5 in) (sedan); 4,350 mm (171.3 in) (hatchback)
- Width: 1,780 mm (70.1 in)
- Height: 1,420 mm (55.9 in) (Koup); 1,445 mm (56.9 in) (sedan); 1,460 mm (57.5 in) (hatchback)
- Curb weight: 1,240–1,345 kg (2,734–2,965 lb) (sedan); 1,320–1,415 kg (2,910–3,120 lb) (hatchback)

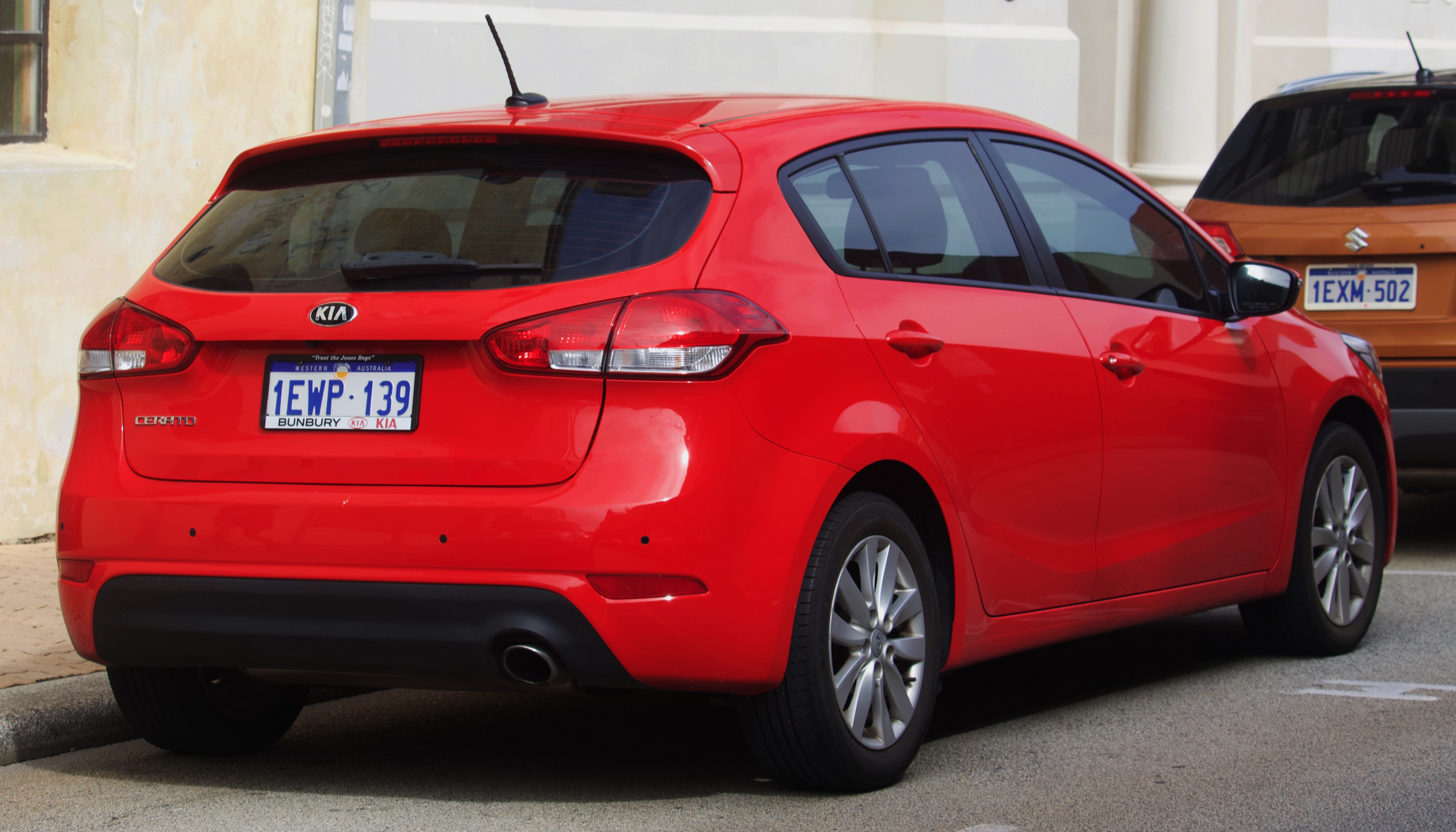
Hatchback (pre-facelift)

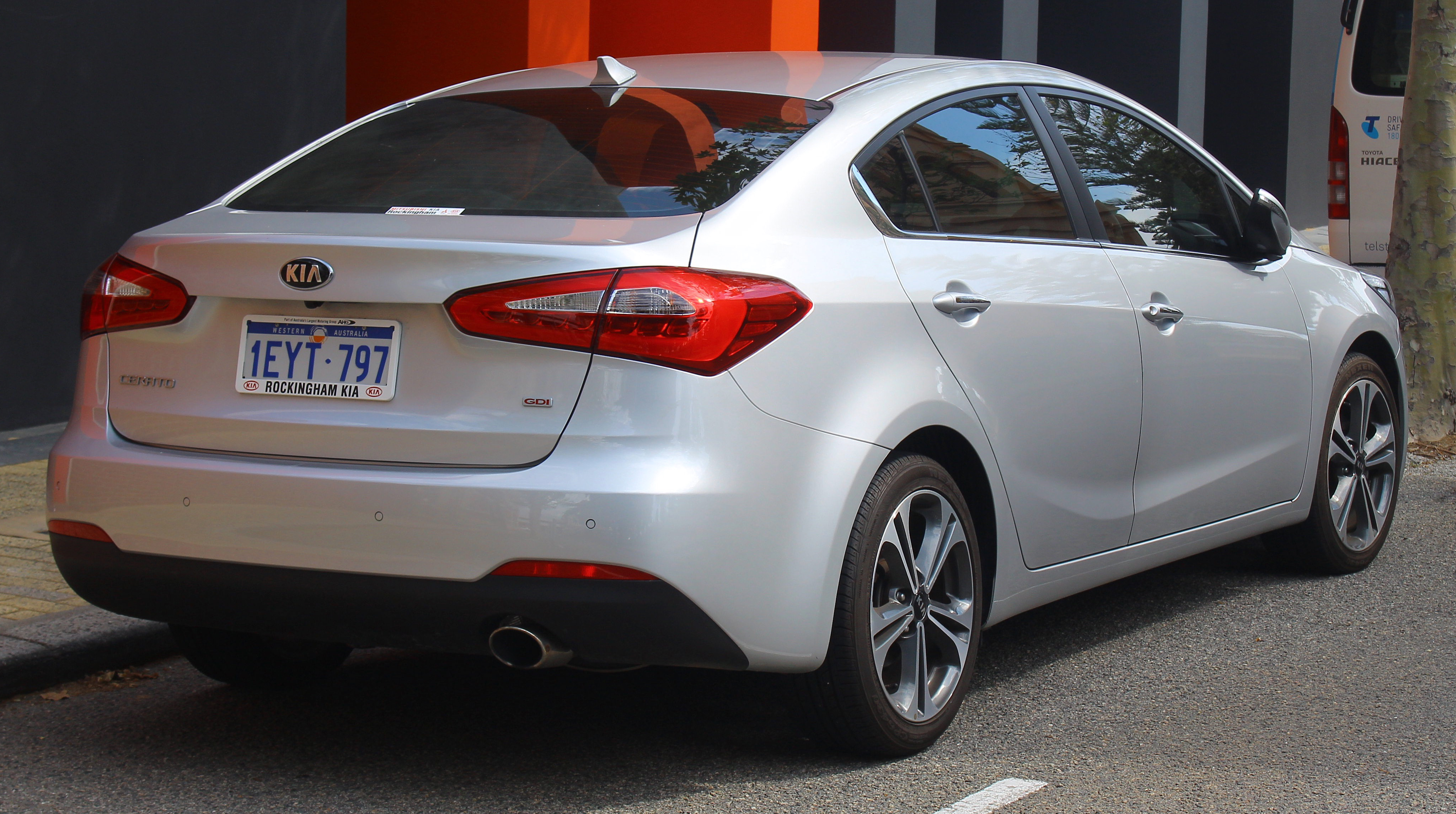
Sedan (pre-facelift)

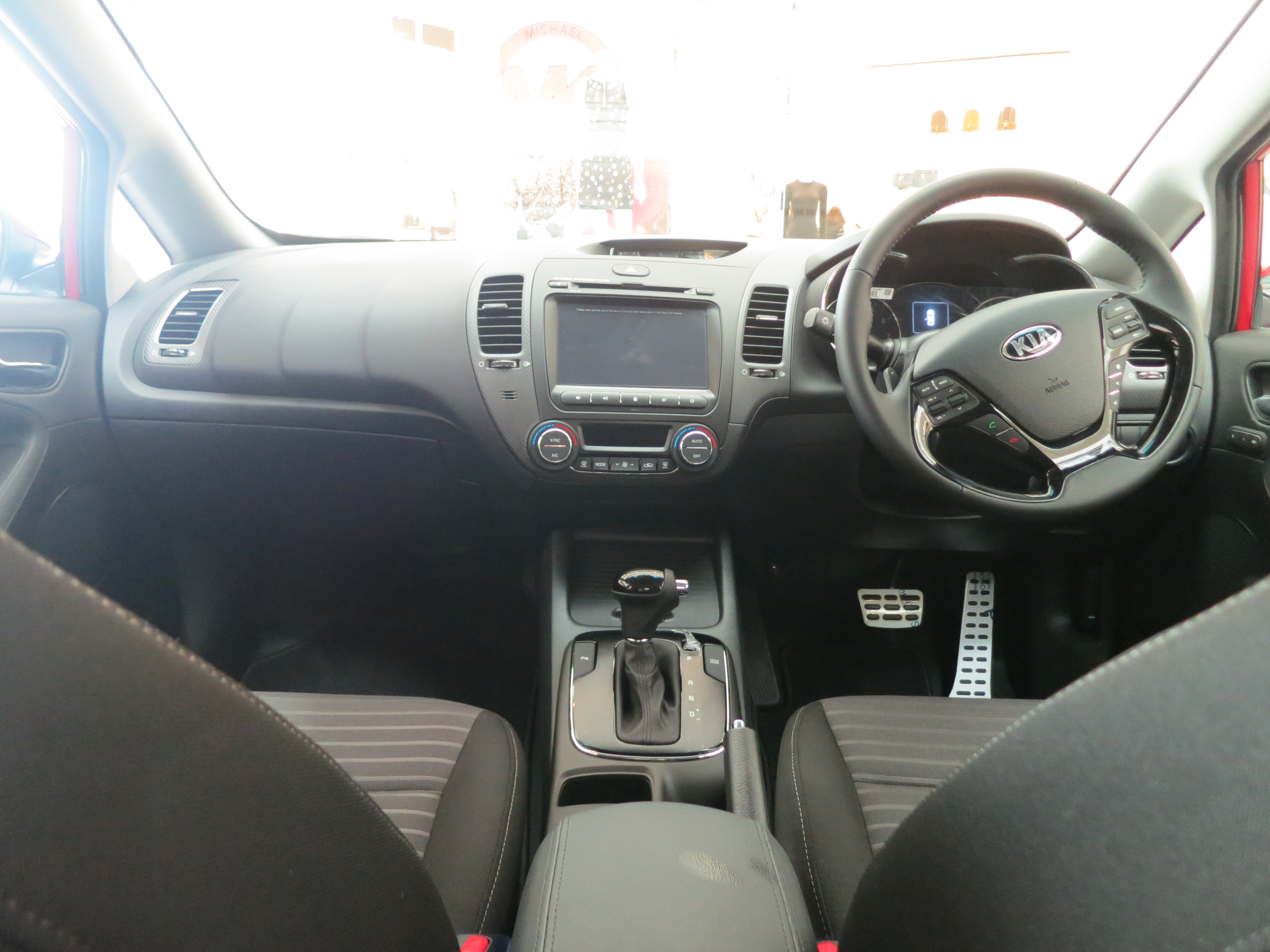
Interior

Kia released images of the second generation Forte for the 2014 model year in late July 2012, when the company revealed its Korean-market counterpart, Kia K3. The car is completely redesigned with a lower, wider, and longer stance.

The second generation Kia Forte includes LED headlights and tail lights as a standard feature, and will further Kia's driver-oriented cockpit design inside. To make it more fuel efficient, the Forte is offered with the new Nu engine, in a 1.8 litre DOHC MPi 4-cylinder producing 148 hp (110 kW) with 131 lb⋅ft (178 N⋅m) of torque, and a 2.0 litre DOHC GDI 4-cylinder rated at 173 hp (129 kW) with 154 lb⋅ft (209 N⋅m) of torque.

The car was presented to the public for the first time outside of South Korea on Santiago Motorshow (Chile) as Kia Cerato, on 3 October 2012.

=== Forte Koup ===
Introduced in mid-2014 for the 2015 model year, the Koup was sold as the Cerato Koup in many markets and as the K3 Koup in the Korean home market. The base, EX model comes standard with a 2.0-litre GDI four-cylinder inline-four engine, and the SX comes with a more powerful 1.6-litre turbocharged four-cylinder that produces 201 hp (150 kW) and 195 lb⋅ft (264 N⋅m) of torque in North American trim.

The base Forte Koup EX comes with standard 16-inch alloy wheels, Bluetooth, SiriusXM satellite radio, a leather-wrapped steering wheel with integrated audio and cruise control buttons, tilt and telescoping steering column, FlexSteer, power windows and LED positioning headlights with fog lights.

The Koup SX comes standard with 18-inch alloy wheels, UVO eServices with Rear Camera Display, dual chrome exhaust tips, and LED tail lights. The sportier SX also features performance enhancements including larger bumper and grille openings, larger front brakes, alloy sport pedals, black gloss grille inserts, and the front fascia and rear valance also include carbon fibre-look trim.

Both trims come with optional HID headlights, navigation system with HD Radio, heated steering wheel, power lumbar, sunroof, heated front seats and ventilated driver's seat, leather-trimmed seating, SmartKey with push-button start, and dual-zone automatic climate control.

The Forte Koup was only in production for about two and a half years as it, along with the Hyundai Genesis Coupe, was discontinued after the 2016 model year due to slow sales.

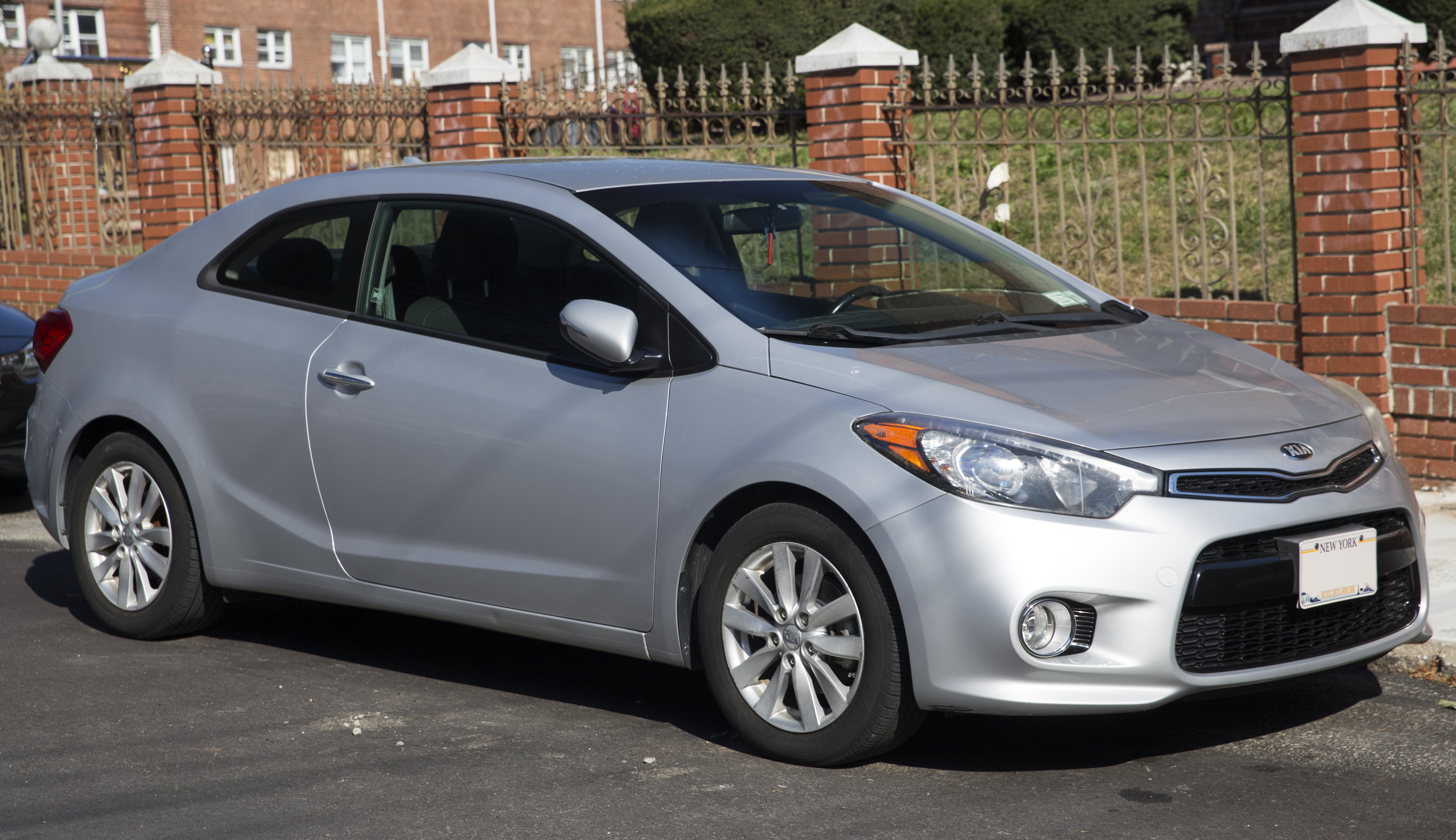
Kia Forte Koup EX

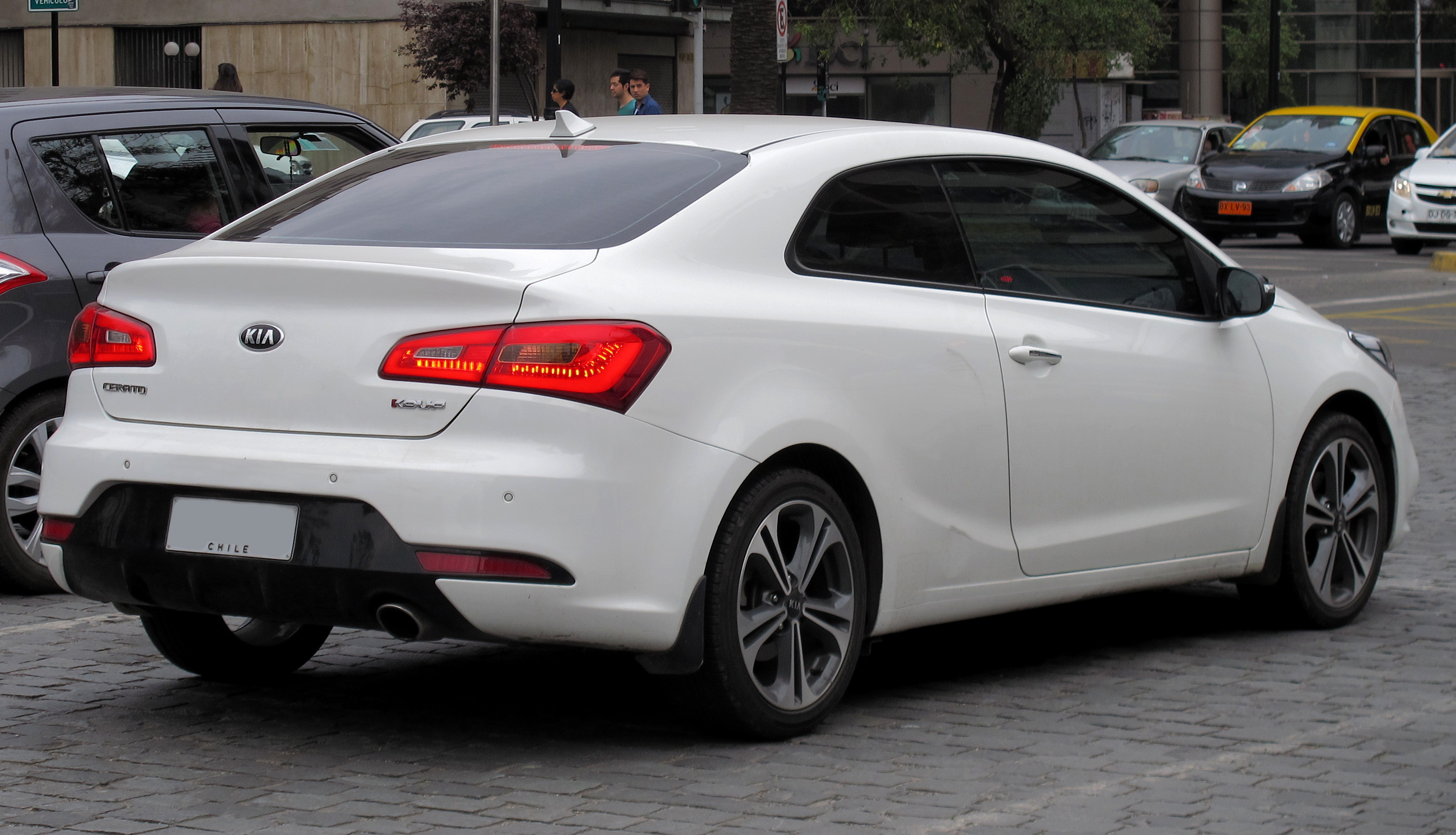
Kia Cerato Koup SX

=== 2017 model year update ===
In 2016 (for the 2017 model year), the Forte received a new facelift with restyled headlights, grille and bumper.

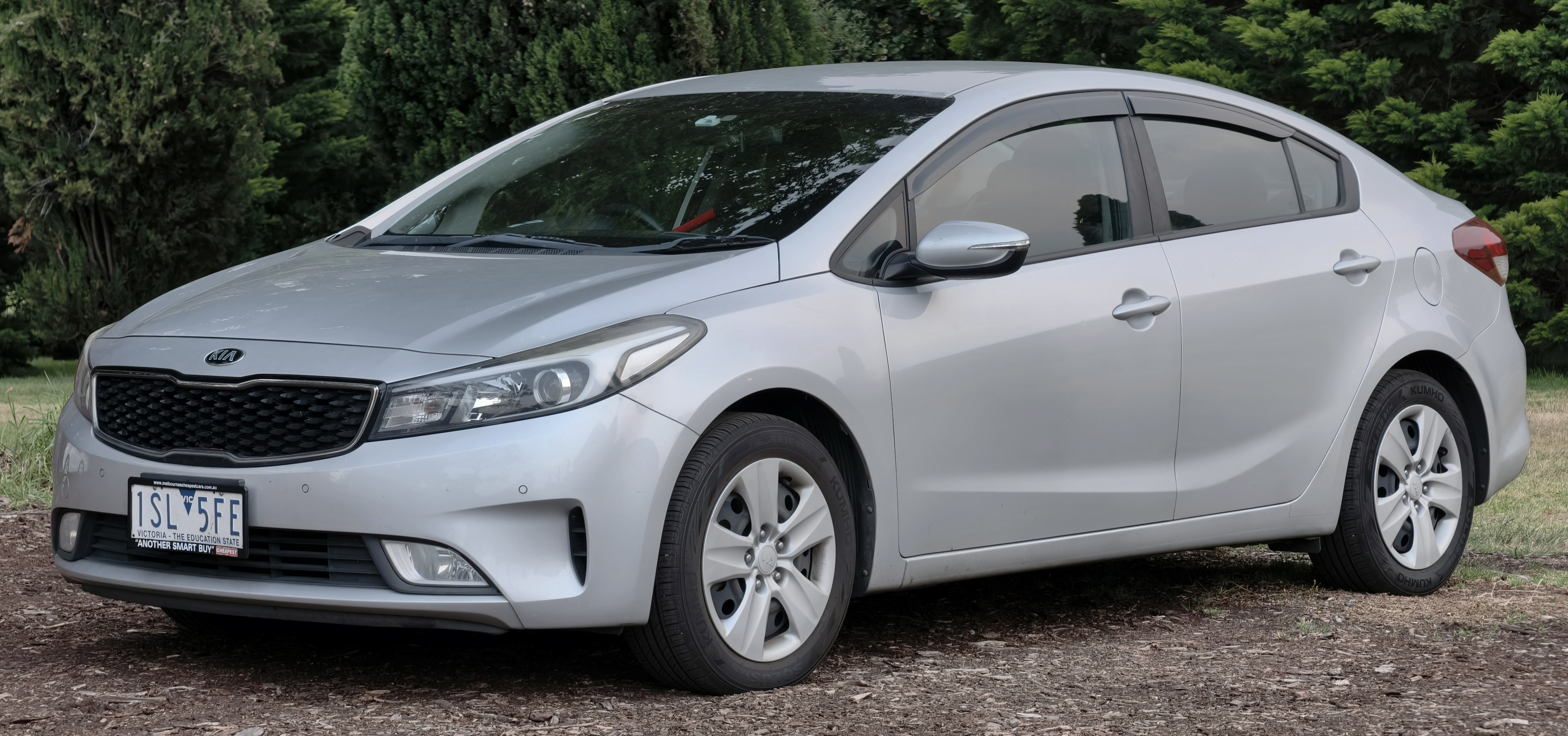
2017 facelift (sedan) (Australia)

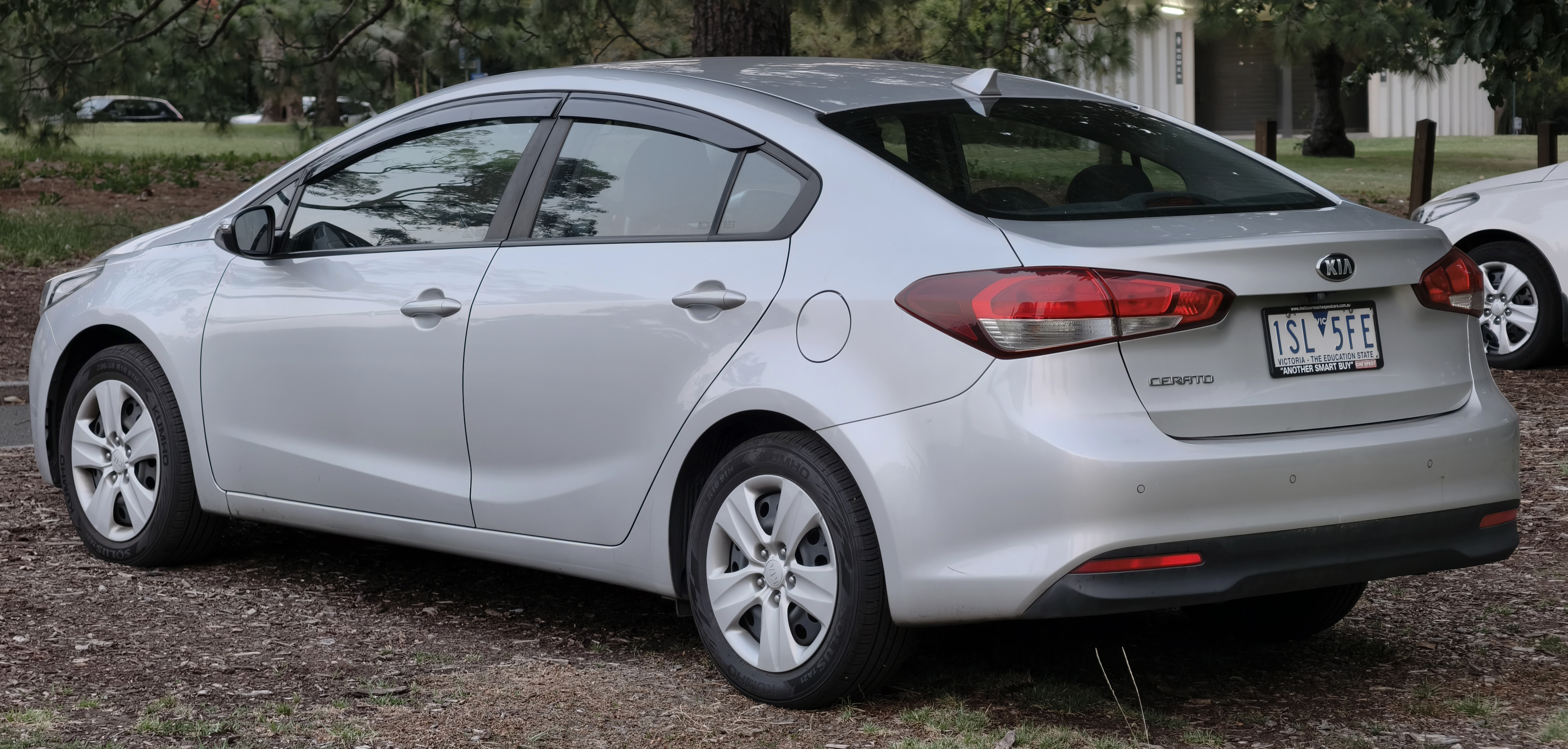
2017 facelift (sedan) (Australia)

=== North America ===
==== Trim levels ====
In the United States, the second-generation Kia Forte was available in four basic trim levels: LX, S, EX, EX premium, and SX (later SX Turbo):

The LX was the base model of the Forte, and offered a plethora of standard equipment: an AM/FM stereo with single-disc CD/MP3 player, Bluetooth, Sirius XM Satellite Radio, and USB and auxiliary audio inputs with a four-speaker audio system, power windows and door locks, keyless entry with flip-key, exterior colour-keyed door handles and side mirrors, fifteen-inch steel wheels with full wheel covers, a multifunction steering wheel, power rear trunk lid release, a split-folding rear bench seat, cloth seating surfaces, dual manually-adjustable front bucket seats, a 2.0L inline four-cylinder (I4) petrol engine, a six-speed manual transmission, and air conditioning. Additional options included sixteen-inch aluminum-alloy wheels, a 4.3-inch touchscreen audio system with Kia UVO, premium cloth seating surfaces, a six-speaker audio system, and a six-speed automatic transmission.

The S became available in 2017, and added convenience features to the base LX trim level, such as: sixteen-inch aluminum-alloy wheels, a six-speed automatic transmission, a seven-inch touchscreen infotainment system featuring Apple CarPlay and Android Auto, a six-speaker audio system, and a leather-wrapped multifunction steering wheel. GPS navigation, and power single-pane sunroof was two of the available options.

The EX was the top-of-the-line Forte trim level, adding features to the base LX, such as: sixteen-inch aluminum-alloy wheels (seventeen-inch on 2016+ models), front fog lamps, power-folding side mirrors with integrated turn signals, a seven-inch touchscreen infotainment system featuring Apple CarPlay and Android Auto (2016+ models only), a six-speaker audio system, a leather-wrapped multifunction steering wheel, and perforated luxury leather-trimmed seating surfaces with dual heated front bucket seats (2016+ models only). Additional options included a driver assistance package, GPS navigation, a 4.3-inch touchscreen audio system with Kia UVO (2014-2015 models only), perforated luxury leather-trimmed seating surfaces (standard on 2016+ models), dual heated front bucket seats (standard on 2016+ models), keyless access with push-button start, seventeen-inch aluminum-alloy wheels (standard on 2016+ models), a ventilated front driver's bucket seat, a single-pane power sunroof, a six-speed automatic transmission, and a rear spoiler.

The SX, only available on the Forte Koup and Forte5, was the top-of-the-line Forte trim level. It added the following options to the EX: GPS navigation, perforated luxury leather-trimmed seating surfaces (2014-2015 models), dual heated front bucket seats (2014-2015 models), a ventilated front driver's bucket seat, premium aluminum-alloy wheels, a 1.6L turbocharged inline four-cylinder (I4) engine (MY2014+ models only), a six-speed automatic transmission (MY2014-MY2016 models only), a seven-speed Dual Clutch (DCT) automatic transmission (MY2017+ models only), a power single-pane sunroof, and keyless access with push-button start. A six-speed manual transmission was the only available option.

=== Market variations ===
==== Asia ====
For the Singaporean market, the car is known as the Forte K3 and is available in EX (16-inch steel wheels, dual airbags, rear air conditioner, LED daylight running lights, leather interior and rear parking sensor) and SX (17-inch alloy wheels, two airbags, front-and-rear parking sensors, keyless entry, push-button start, leather interior, power driver seat with memory) trims, with LED daylight running lights and rear aircon vents standard. Eurostyle touchscreen entertainment system available as an optional upgrade through a tie-up with a local installer. The only engine available is the naturally-aspirated 1.6-litre petrol Gamma MPi producing 128 hp (130ps).

In the Malaysian market, the second generation Forte was launched in July 2013 as the "Kia Cerato". Throughout the time available in Malaysia, two engines were available: 1.6-litre Gamma II and 2.0-litre Nu MPi. At launch, two variants were available: 1.6 and 2.0 and in July 2014, a 1.6 KX variant was added positioned lower than the regular 1.6 variant. In November 2015, the "Koup" variant was added to the range powered by a 1.6 litre Gamma T-GDI engine. In December 2016, the facelift version was made available with the same three variants and engines to choose from.

=== Safety ===
In a small overlap frontal crash test carried out by the Insurance Institute for Highway Safety (IIHS), the Kia Forte scored the lowest in the group in 2013. The test simulates the front corner of the vehicle hits a tree, utility pole, or even another vehicle at 40-mph. According to the IIHS, this situation accounts for about a quarter of the serious injuries sustained in frontal crashes. The 2017 redesigned Kia Forte earned the Insurance Institute for Highway Safety (IIHS) top safety pick for the compact car segment.

IIHS test results based on the 2018 Kia Forte:

Test	Rating
Overall:	5/5 stars
Small overlap front:	Good
Moderate overlap front:	Good
Side:	Good
Roof strength:	Good
Head restraints & seats:	Good
Front crash prevention:	Superior
Headlights:	Good
Child seat anchors (Latch) ease of use:	Acceptable

ANCAP test results Kia Forte all variants (2013)
Test	Score
Overall	5 /5 stars
Frontal offset	14.51/16
Side impact	16/16
Pole	2/2
Seat belt reminders	3/3
Whiplash protection	Good
Pedestrian protection	Adequate
Electronic stability control	Standard

ANCAP test results Kia Forte all Koup variants (2013)
Test	Score
Overall	5 /5 stars
Frontal offset	14.51/16
Side impact	16/16
Pole	2/2
Seat belt reminders	3/3
Whiplash protection	Good
Pedestrian protection	Adequate
Electronic stability control	Standard

ANCAP test results Kia Forte all hatch variants (2013)
Test	Score
Overall	5 /5 stars
Frontal offset	14.51/16
Side impact	16/16
Pole	2/2
Seat belt reminders	3/3
Whiplash protection	Good
Pedestrian protection	Adequate
Electronic stability control	Standard

ANCAP test results Kia Forte all sedan variants (2013)
Test	Score
Overall	5 /5 stars
Frontal offset	14.51/16
Side impact	16/16
Pole	2/2
Seat belt reminders	3/3
Whiplash protection	Good
Pedestrian protection	Adequate
Electronic stability control	Standard

== Third generation (BD; 2018) ==
Third generation
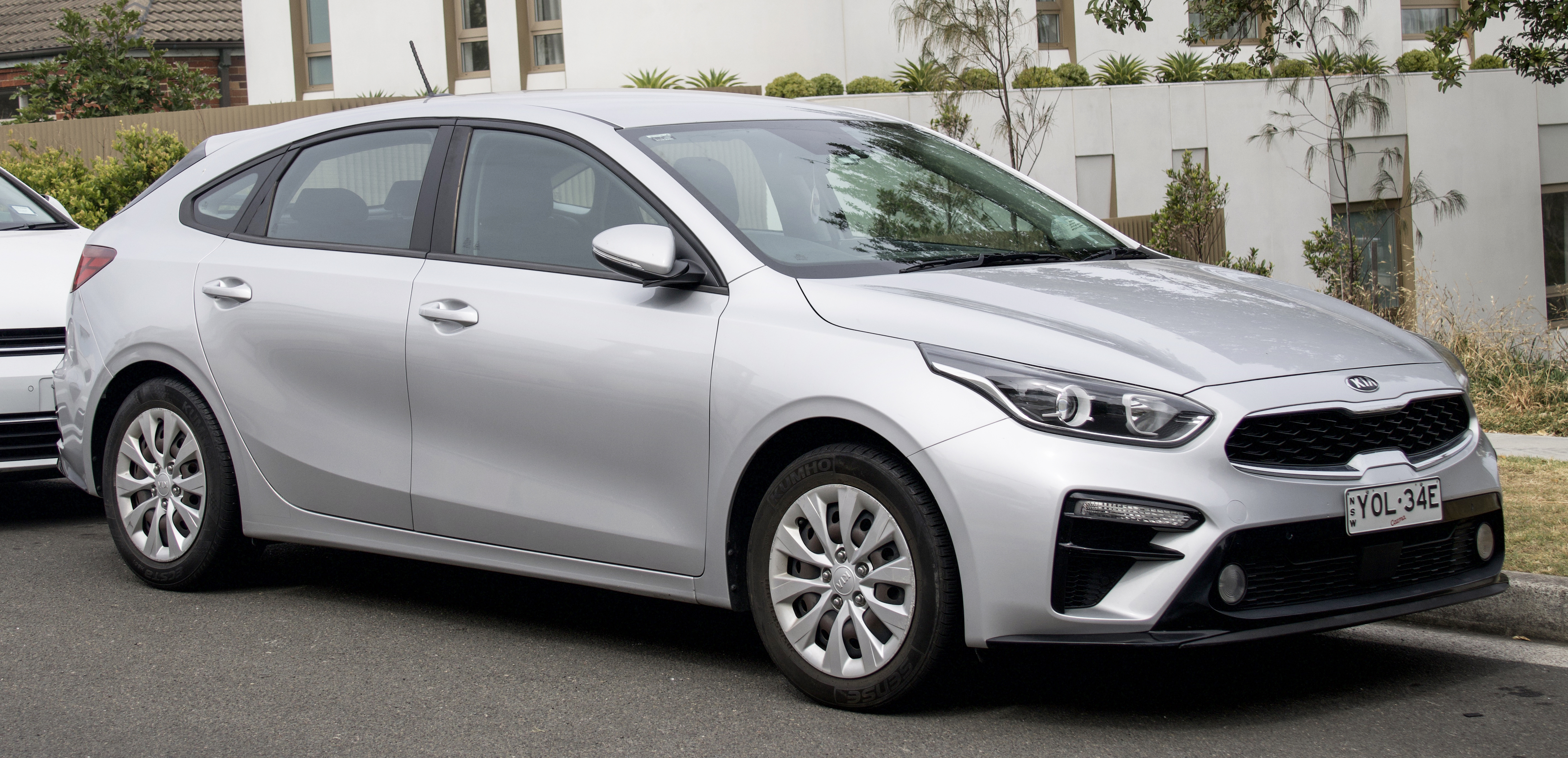

Overview
- Model code: BD
- Also called: Kia Cerato (exception of South Korea and China); Kia K3 (South Korea, Vietnam and China)
- Production: 2018–2024
- Model years: 2019–2024
- Assembly: South Korea: Hwaseong (Hwaseong Plant); Mexico: Pesquería, Nuevo León (KMMX); Algeria: Batna (GLOVIZ) (2018-2019); China: Yancheng (Yueda Kia); Russia: Kaliningrad (Avtotor); Vietnam: Chu Lai (THACO Kia)
- Designer: Peter Schreyer; Karim Habib (2021 facelift)

Body and chassis
- Body style: 4-door sedan; 5-door hatchback (GT/Forte5/Cerato5)
- Related: Kia Ceed (CD); Hyundai Avante/Elantra (AD); Hyundai i30 (PD)

Powertrain
- Engine: Petrol: 1.4 L Kappa II T-GDi I4; 1.5 L Smartstream G1.5 MPi I4; 1.6 L Gamma II MPi I4; 1.6 L Smartstream G1.6 MPi I4; 1.6 L Gamma II T-GDi I4; 2.0 L Nu MPi I4; Petrol hybrid: 1.6 L Smartstream G1.6 GDi PHEV I4; Diesel: 1.6 L Smartstream D1.6 CRDi I4
- Transmission: 6-speed manual; 6-speed automatic; 6-speed DCT; 7-speed DCT; CVT

Dimensions
- Wheelbase: 2,700 mm (106.3 in)
- Length: 4,640 mm (182.7 in) (sedan); 4,510 mm (177.6 in) (hatchback); 4,660 mm (183.5 in) (China)
- Width: 1,800 mm (70.9 in); 1,780 mm (70.1 in) (China)
- Height: 1,440 mm (56.7 in); 1,450 mm (57.1 in) (China)
- Curb weight: 1,230–1,265 kg (2,712–2,789 lb) (China); 1,545 kg (3,406 lb) (PHEV, China)

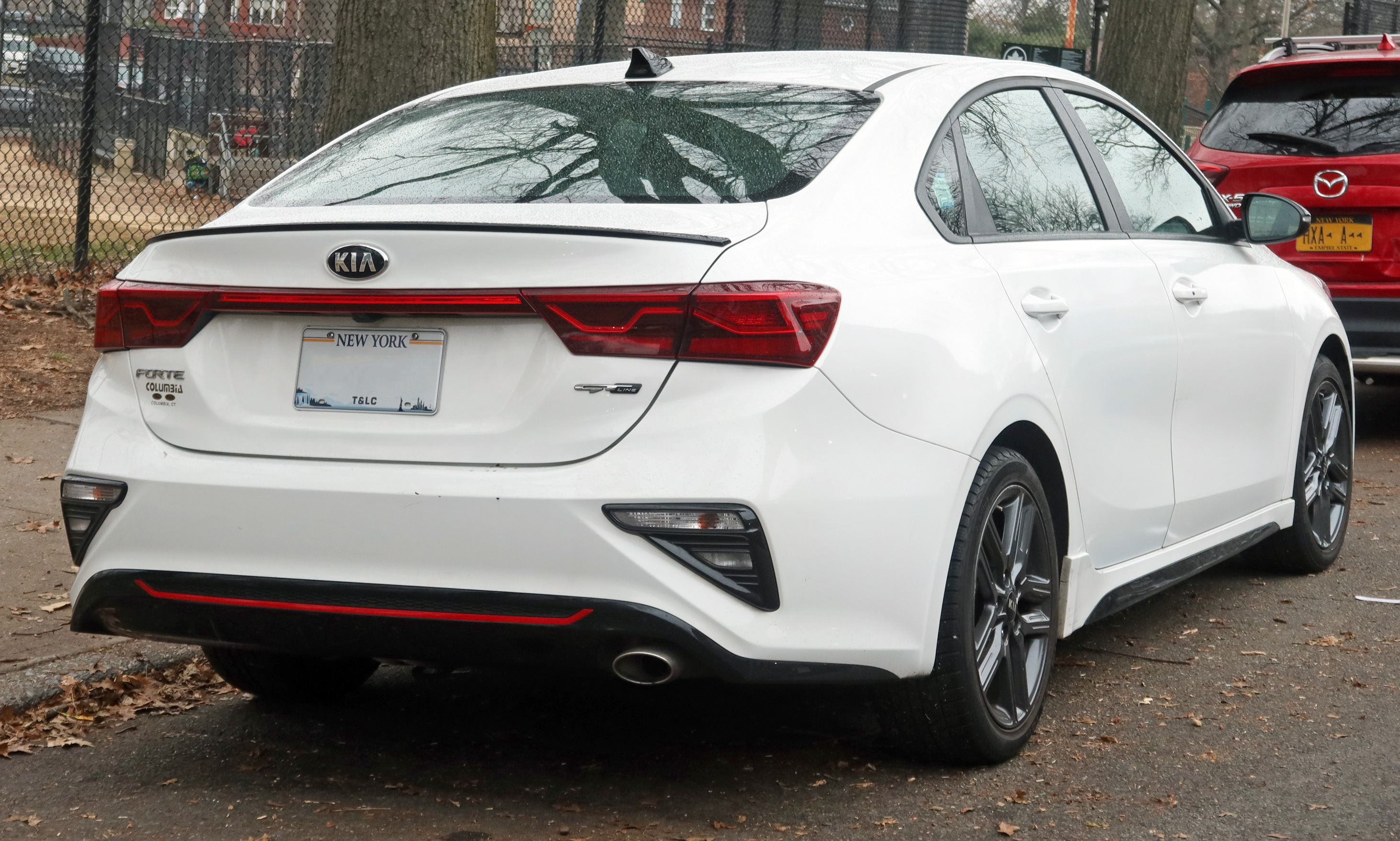
Sedan (pre-facelift)

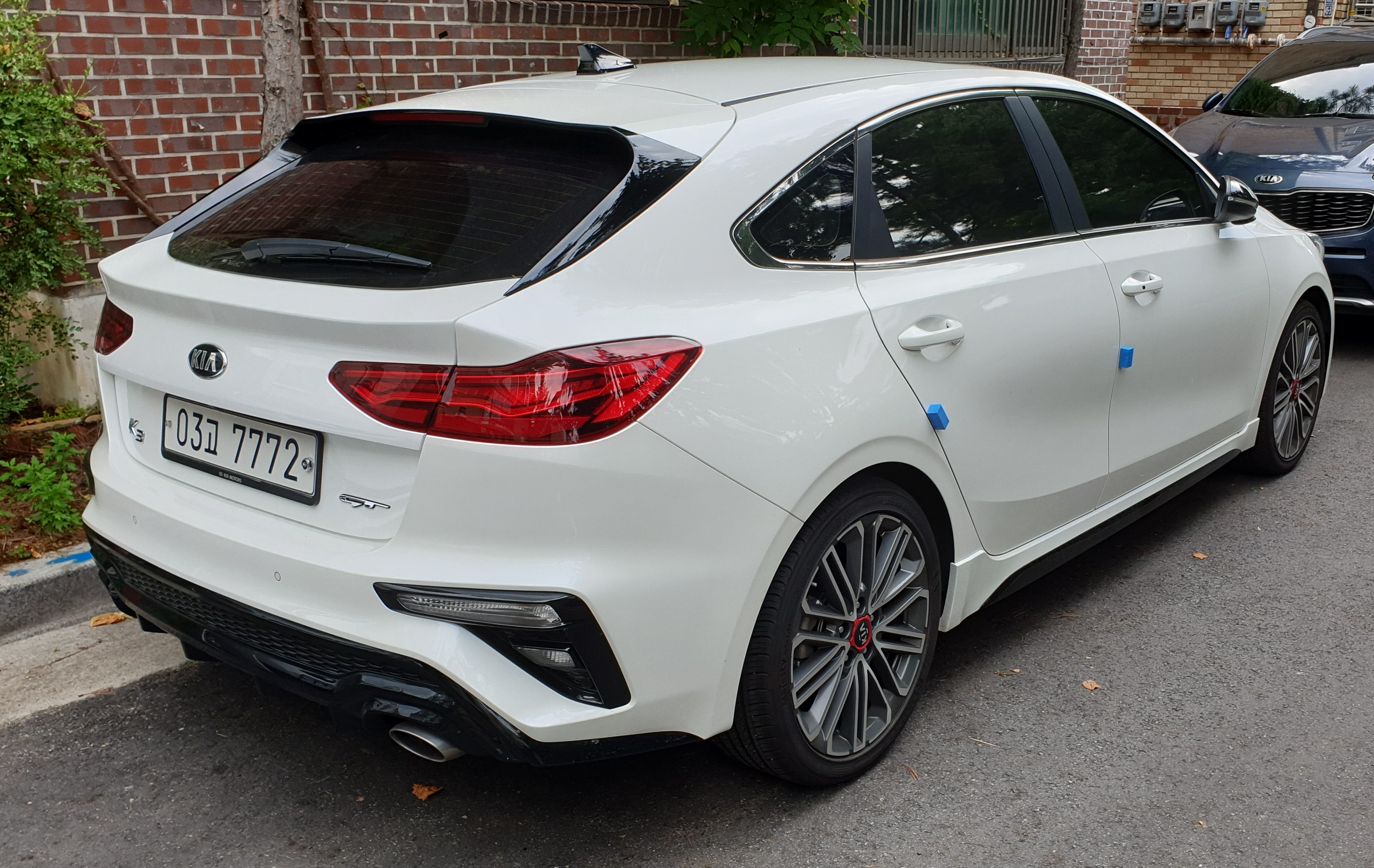
Hatchback (pre-facelift)

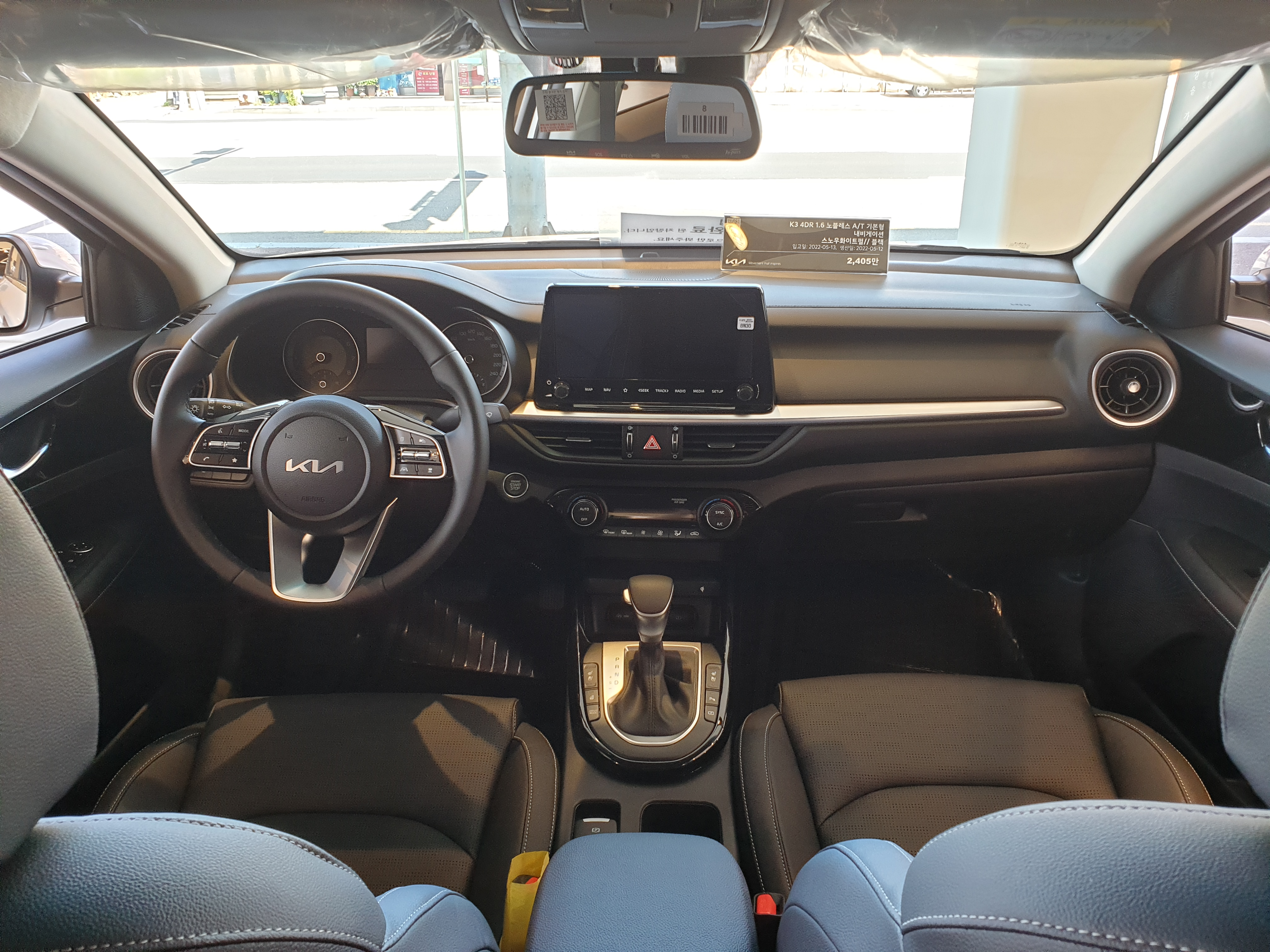
Interior

On 15 January 2018, Kia unveiled the third-generation Forte sedan at the 2018 North American International Auto Show in Detroit, Michigan. Taking styling cues from the Kia Stinger, the new Forte adopts a cab rearward exterior, resulting in a fastback profile and a short trunklid. The car is constructed with 54% advanced high-strength steel that is stronger than the outgoing model. The Forte will be offered with a 2.0L I4 carried over from the second generation model mated to either a 6-speed manual transmission, 6-speed automatic, 7-speed DCT, or Kia's first CVT, which Kia refers to as an IVT.

The third-generation Kia Forte hatchback was later unveiled in late 2018 in South Korea, and is only available in selected markets such as Australia, Canada, Mexico, New Zealand, Trinidad and Tobago, Argentina, Chile, Cameroon, Seychelles, Brunei, Kuwait, Lebanon, Saudi Arabia, Mongolia, Hong Kong, South Korea, Singapore, and Fiji.

The all-new Forte was designed by Kia lead designer Peter Schreyer, who also designed the Kia Stinger. The exterior profile of the 2019 Forte resembles that of the Stinger, and certain interior styling cues, such as a "Floating" centre display touchscreen for the infotainment system, and round HVAC vents, were taken directly from the Stinger as well.

=== North America ===
==== United States ====
The Kia Forte is available in four trim levels: base FE and LXS, mid-level S, and top-level EX. It went on sale in the late 2018 as a 2019 model year vehicle offered only in sedan form. The new redesigned Kia Forte5 hatchback was not available in the U.S. since it was already discontinued in 2018 due to low sales.

All trim levels of the new Forte includes many features that are otherwise optional on its competitors, including automatic front headlights, a tilt and telescopic steering column, a rear trunk light, rear seat heat ducts, an eight-inch, touchscreen infotainment system featuring Apple CarPlay and Android Auto, steering wheel-mounted audio system controls, cruise control, Forward Collision Avoidance (FCA), Lane Departure Warning (LDW), and Lane Keeping Assist (LKA).

In addition to its standard equipment, other notable available features on the all-new Forte include LED interior lighting, a ten-way, power-adjustable front driver's seat with lumbar support, heated and ventilated dual front bucket seats, soft-touch interior surfaces, a 320-watt, eight-speaker premium amplified audio system by Harman Kardon, wireless device charging, drive mode selection, and a smart cruise control (SCC).

==== Canada ====
In Canada, the Kia Forte is available in both sedan and hatchback forms. The Forte sedan went on sale in 2018 for the 2019 model year and was initially available in five trim levels: LX, EX, EX-Plus, EX-Premium, and EX-Limited.

The second-generation Forte5 hatchback remained on sale until 2020, when they introduced the newly redesigned Forte5 for the Canadian market as an exclusive option and made it available in three trim levels: EX, GT, and GT-Limited.

==== Mexico ====
The Kia Forte for the Mexican market was initially offered in four trim levels: L, LX, EX, and EX Premium. It is offered in sedan and hatchback body styles. On 11 June 2021, the locally-built Forte was facelifted for the Mexican market, based on the Korean K3 styling. It is offered in the LX (sedan only), EX, GT Line, and GT trim levels and offered in automatic and manual transmission options.

==== 2020 update ====
The GT and GT-Line trim levels were added, and the S trim level was discontinued, as well as the 6-speed manual transmission option. The LX trim was also discontinued, and the LX was renamed LXS.

=== Australia ===
The Kia Cerato was introduced in mid-2018 in sedan form only, available in three trim levels: S, Sport, and Sport+. In late 2018, the range was bolstered with the addition of the hatchback body style and GT trim level which features a 1.6L turbo petrol engine; it produces 150 kilowatts and 265 newton meters of torque. The lower trims are equipped with a 2.0 L Nu engine producing 112 kilowatts and 192 newton metres of torque. A 6-speed manual and a 6-speed torque converter automatic is available with the 2.0L models while a 7-speed dual clutch automatic is available with the 1.6L Turbo in the GT trim.

Due to the lack of advanced AEB features as standard on the entry-level S and Sport variants, the Cerato received a split ANCAP safety rating, with S and Sport receiving a four-star rating and other models five-star. The fleet-only Si trim level was later added for the 2019 model year with advanced AEB as standard.

==== Powertrain ====
Petrol engines
Model	Engine	Power	Torque	Transmissions	Acceleration 0–100 km/h (0-62 mph) (official)
1.4 Kappa II T-GDI	1,353 cc (82.6 cu in) turbo I4	130 PS (96 kW; 128 hp) at 5,500 rpm	211 N⋅m (156 lb⋅ft; 21.5 kg⋅m) at 1,400–3,700 rpm	7-speed DCT	
1.5 L Smartstream G1.5 MPI	1,497 cc (91.4 cu in) I4	115 PS (85 kW; 113 hp) at 6,300 rpm	144 N⋅m (106 lb⋅ft; 14.7 kg⋅m) at 4,500 rpm	CVT	
1.6 L Gamma MPI	1,591 cc (97.1 cu in) I4	128 PS (94 kW; 126 hp) at 6,300 rpm	155 N⋅m (114 lb⋅ft; 15.8 kg⋅m) at 4,500 rpm	6-speed manual 6-speed automatic	10.1s (manual); 11.6s (automatic)
1.6 L Smartstream G1.6 MPI	1,598 cc (97.5 cu in) I4	123 PS (90 kW; 121 hp) at 6,300 rpm	154 N⋅m (114 lb⋅ft; 15.7 kg⋅m) at 4,500 rpm	CVT	
1.6 Gamma T-GDI	1,591 cc (97.1 cu in) turbo I4	204 PS (150 kW; 201 hp) at 6,000 rpm	265 N⋅m (195 lb⋅ft; 27.0 kg⋅m) at 1,500–4,500 rpm	6-speed manual 7-speed DCT	
2.0 L Nu MPI	1,999 cc (122.0 cu in) I4	149 PS (110 kW; 147 hp) at 6,200 rpm	179 N⋅m (132 lb⋅ft; 18.3 kg⋅m) at 4,500 rpm	6-speed manual 6-speed automatic CVT	9.8s (automatic)
Hybrid engines
1.6 L Smartstream D1.6 GDI PHEV	1,580 cc (96.4 cu in) I4	141 PS (104 kW; 139 hp) at 5,700 rpm	265 N⋅m (195 lb⋅ft; 27.0 kg⋅m)	6-speed DCT	

==== Marketing ====
On 17 September 2018, Kia Motors America uploaded their commercial for the 2019 Forte, featuring the race-spec Red Bull car and professional race car driver Collete Davis.

=== 2021 facelift ===
The facelifted K3 was introduced in South Korea on 20 April 2021, featuring both a 1.6-litre petrol and a GT 1.6-litre turbo petrol engine. Regarding the North American market, on 11 June 2021, the facelifted Forte first arrived in Mexico, built at the Pesquería plant in Nuevo León. The updated facelifted Kia Forte sedan later came to the United States on 11 October 2021. And lastly, in Canada, both the facelift sedan and hatchback models arrived on 6 December 2021.

Powertrain
Model	Displacement	Power	Torque	Transmissions
1.6 petrol	1,598 cc	123 PS (90 kW; 121 hp) at 6,300 rpm	154 N⋅m (114 lb⋅ft; 15.7 kg⋅m) at 4,500 rpm	IVT
1.6 petrol turbo	1,591 cc	204 PS (150 kW; 201 hp) at 6,000 rpm	265 N⋅m (195 lb⋅ft; 27.0 kg⋅m) at 1,500–4,500 rpm	7-speed DCT

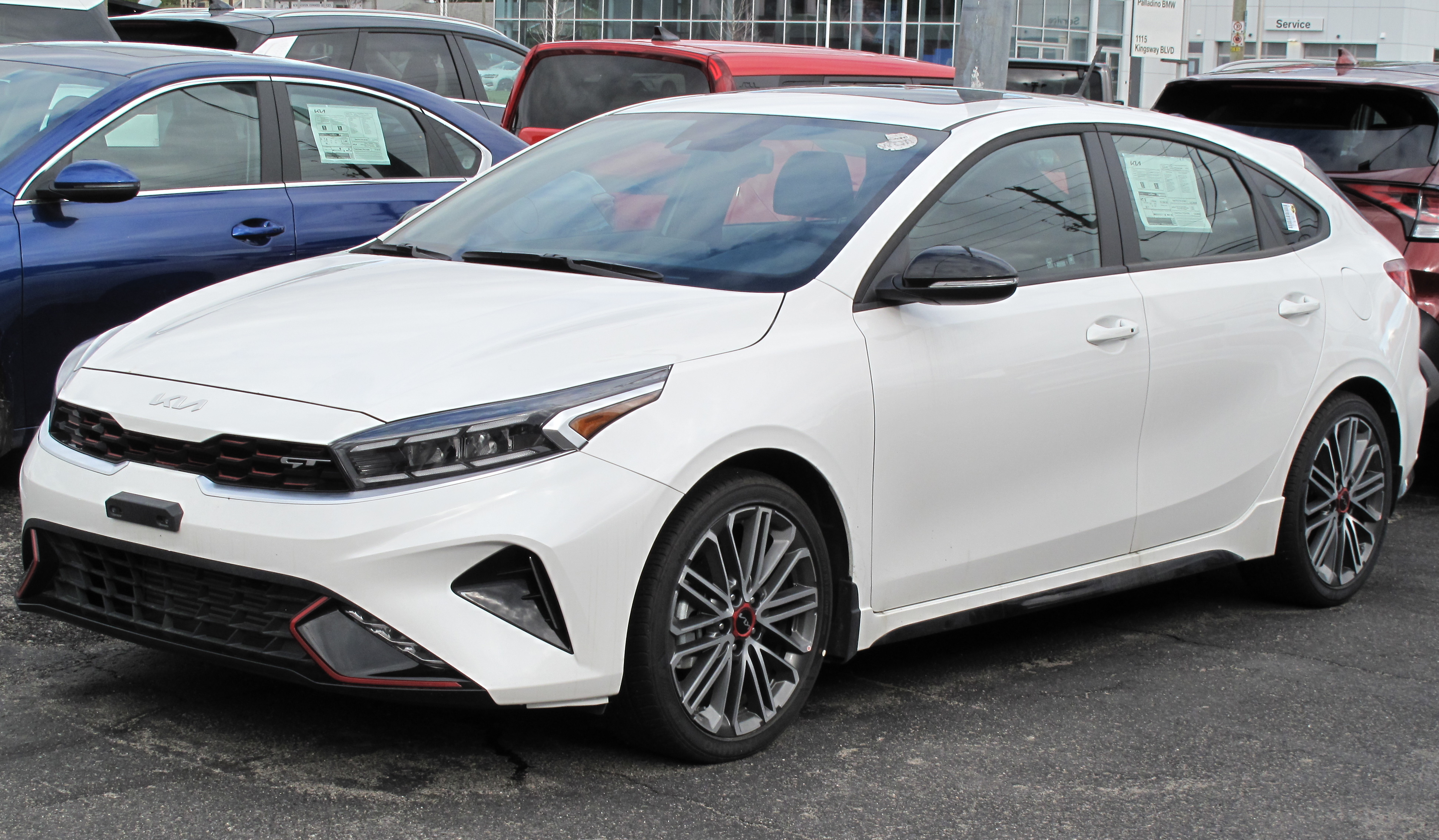
Hatchback (facelift) (Canada)

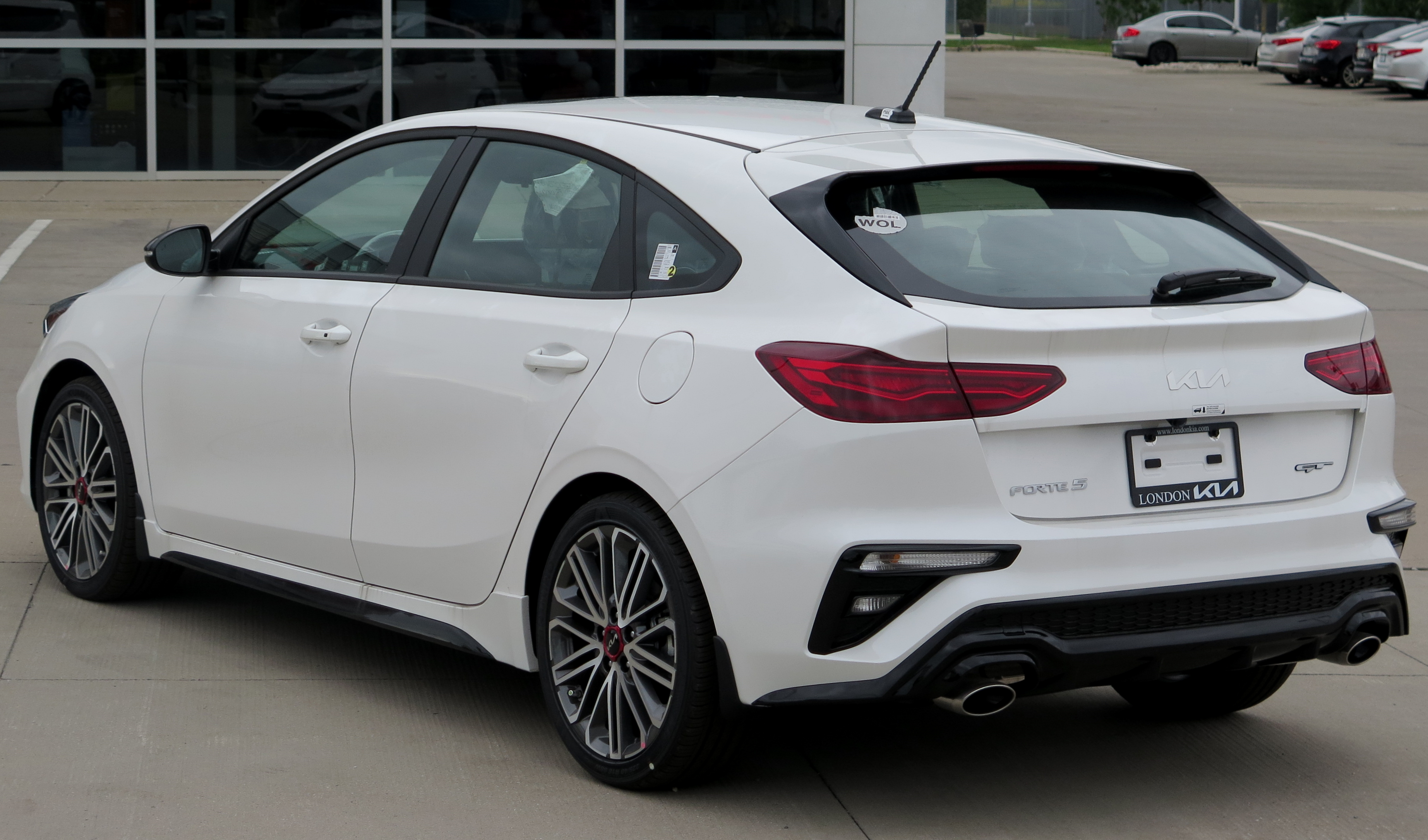
Hatchback (facelift) (Canada)

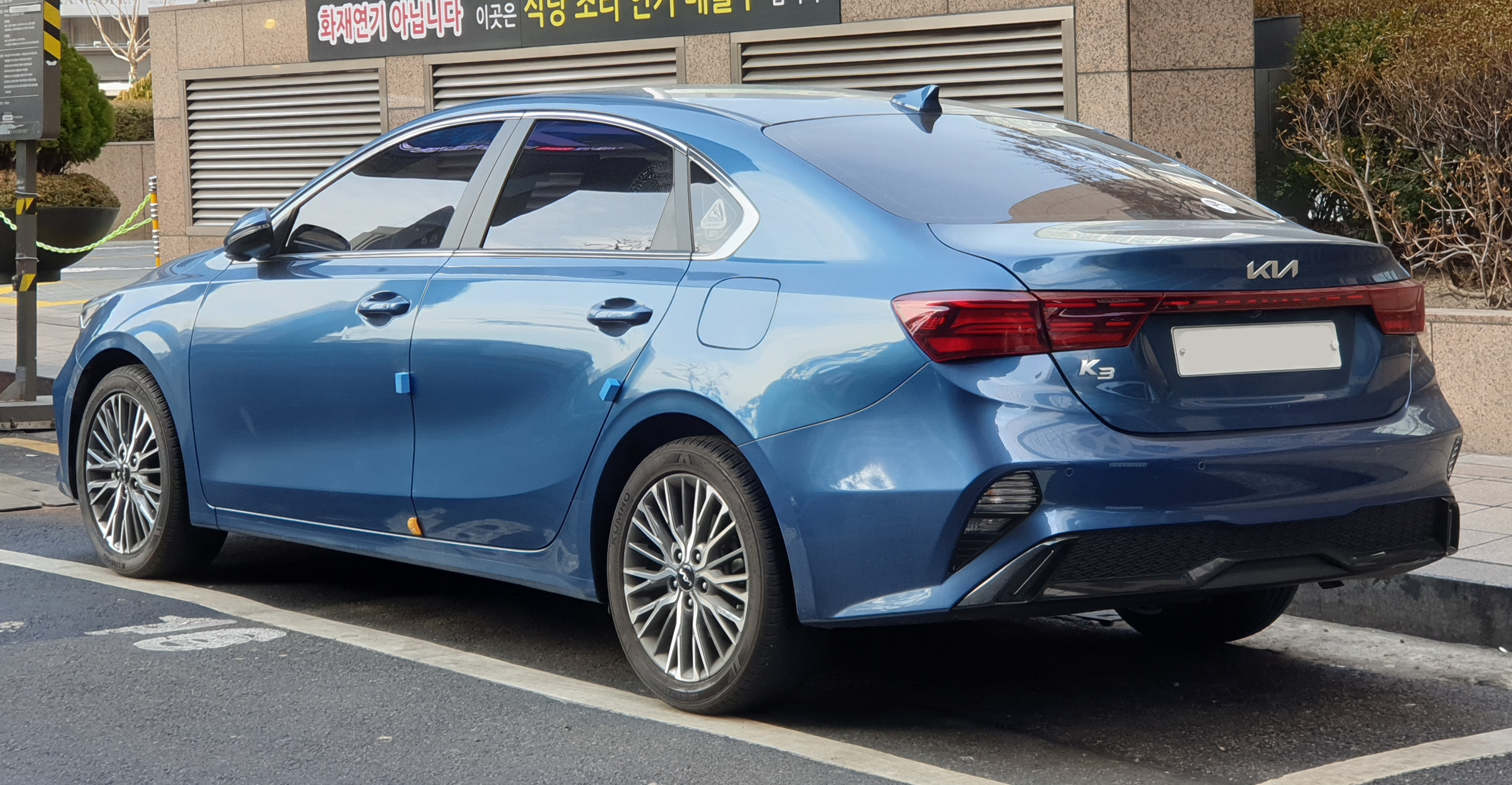
Sedan (facelift) (South Korea)

=== China ===
Launched in June 2019, the Chinese version of the Kia K3 was produced by Yueda Kia, and features a redesigned front and rear down road graphics. Engine options include a 1.5 litre inline-4 engine and a 1.4 litre turbo inline-4 engine, with a PHEV version also available.

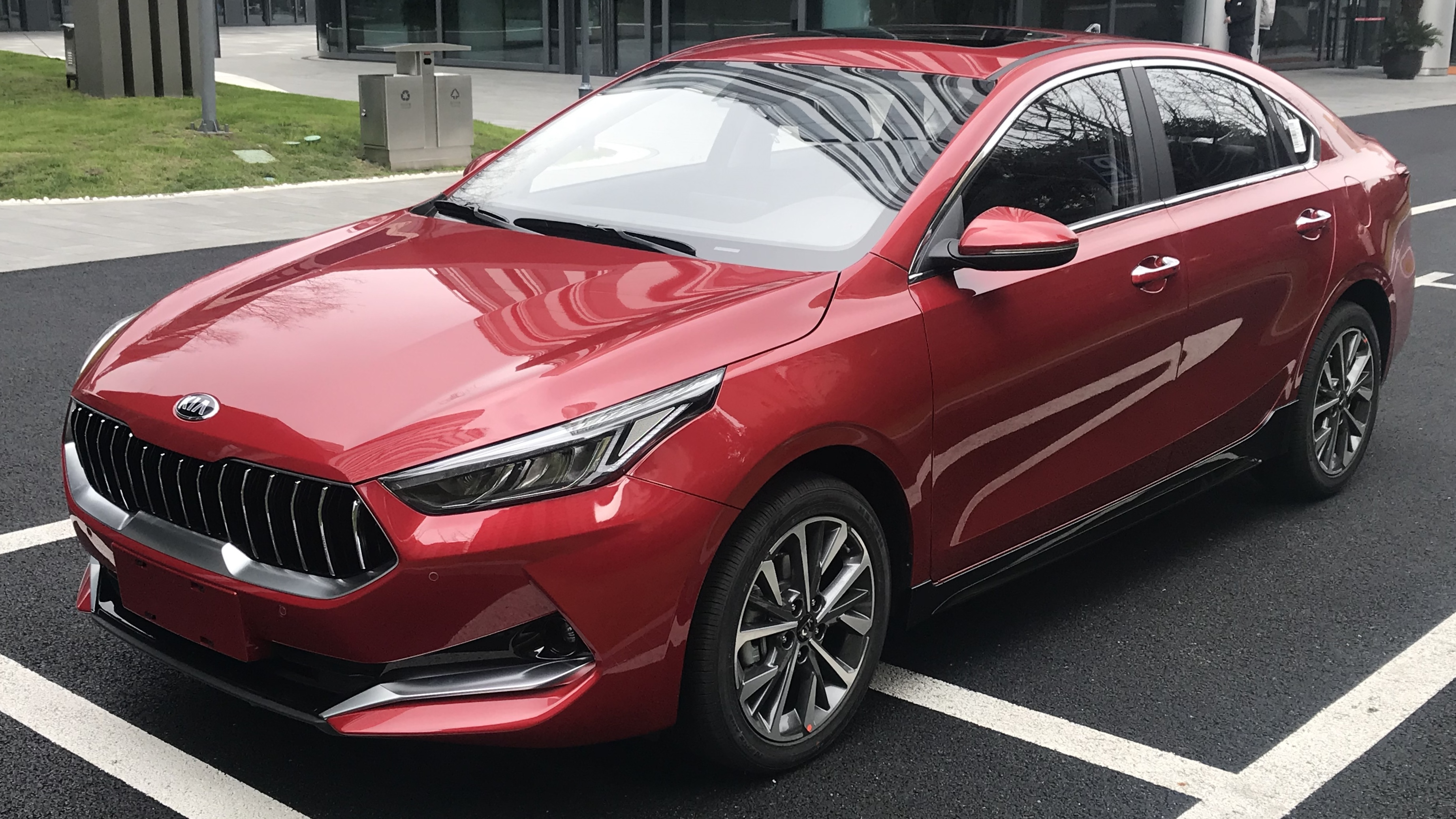
Kia K3 (BD; China)

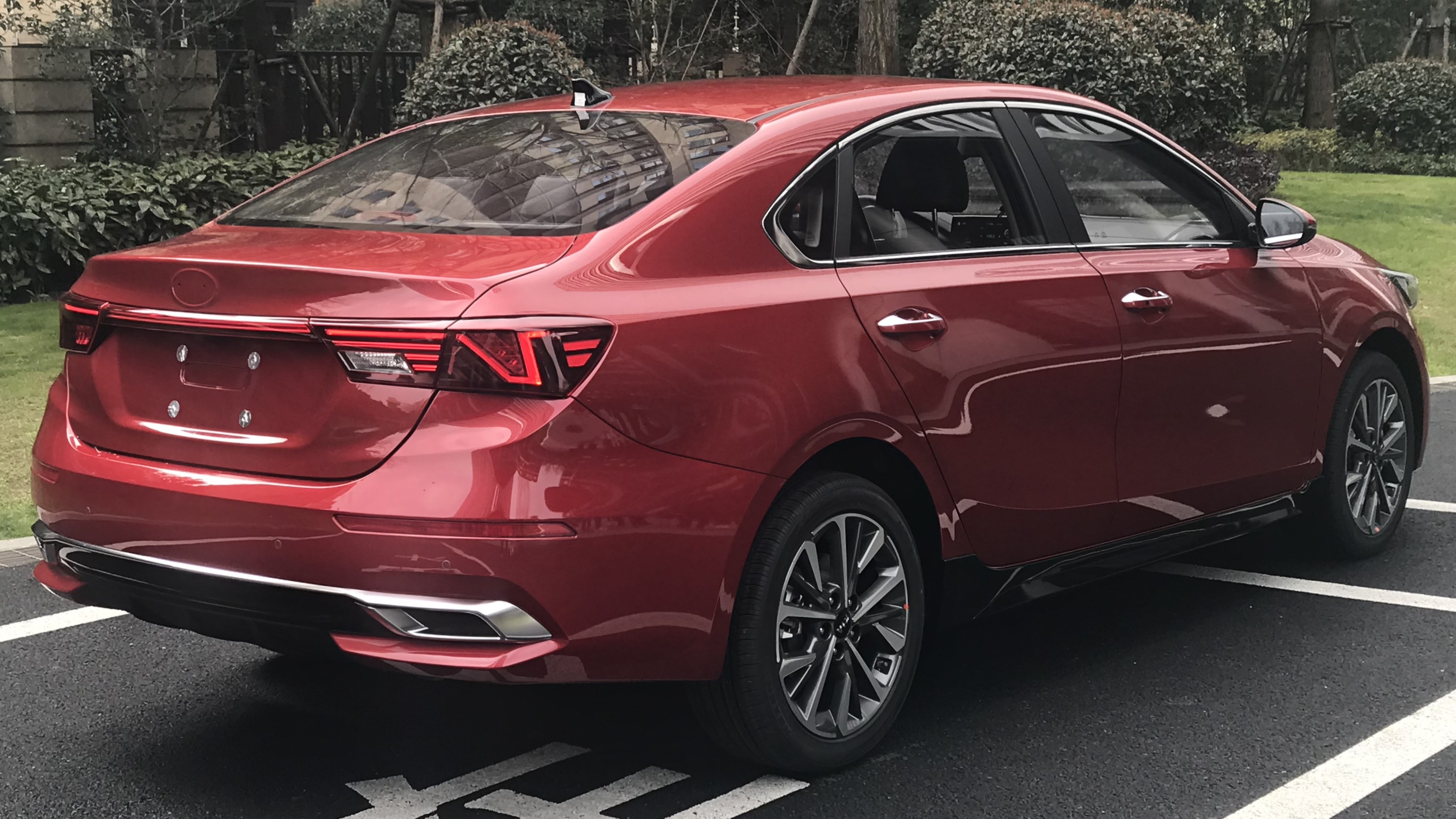
Kia K3 (BD; China)

==== 2023 facelift ====
Different from the international version, the Chinese version of the Kia K3 received the mid-cycle refresh in 2023.

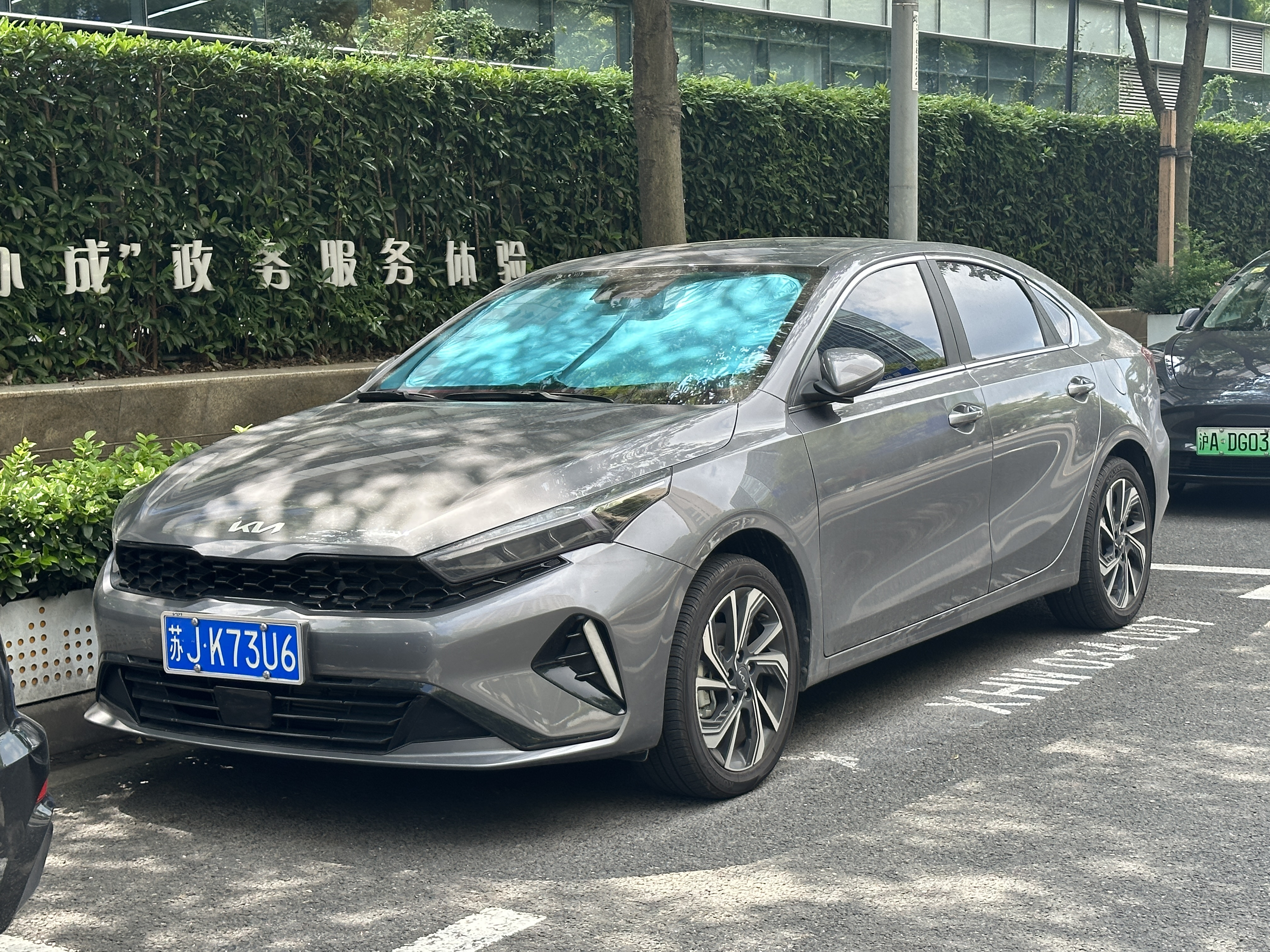
2023 Kia K3 facelift (BD; China)

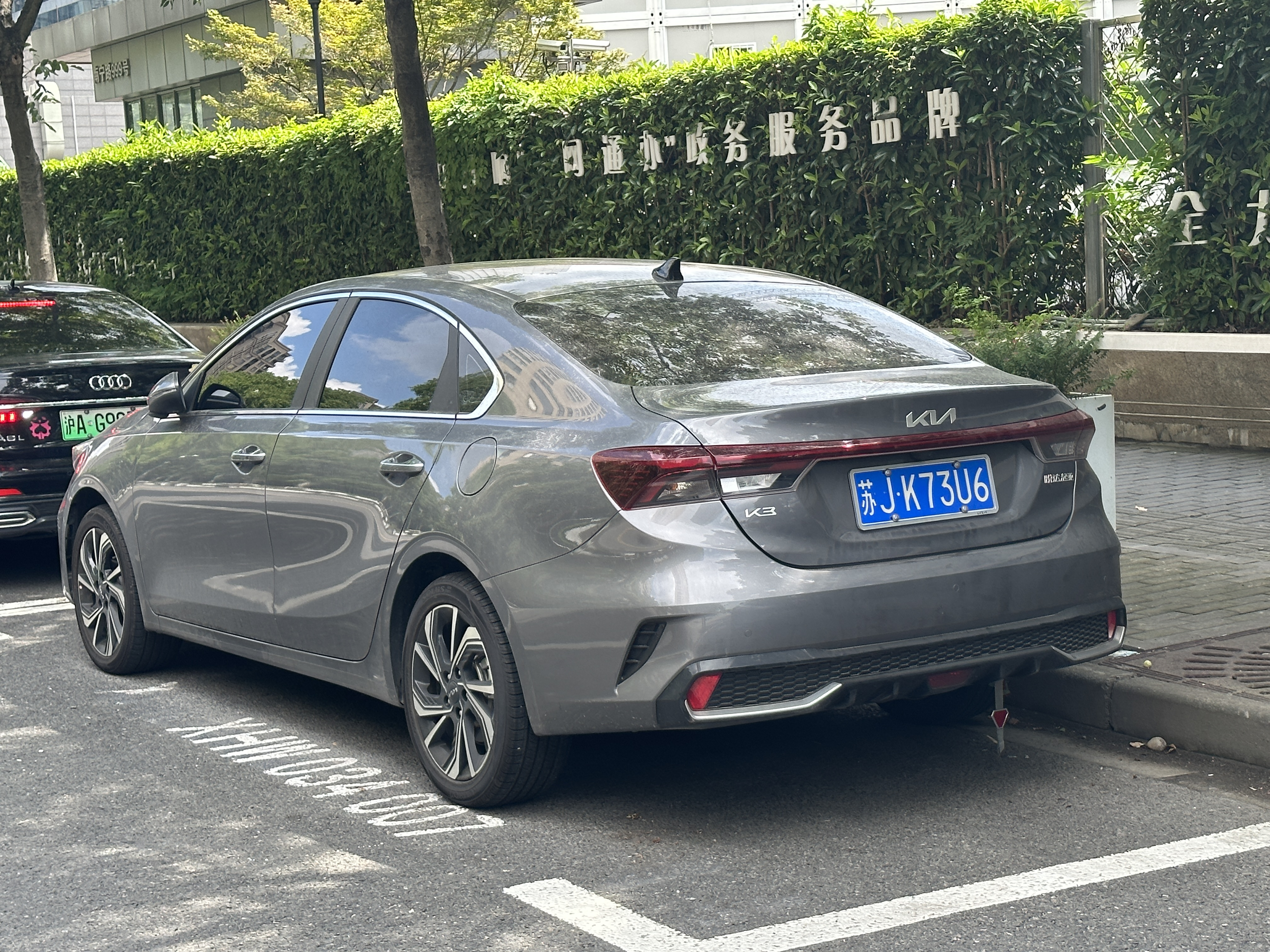
2023 Kia K3 facelift (BD; China)

=== Safety ===
The 2022 Forte was tested by the IIHS:

IIHS scores
Small overlap front (Driver)	Good	
Small overlap front (Passenger)	Good	
Moderate overlap front	Good	
Side (original test)	Good	
Side (updated test)	Poor	
Roof strength	Good	
Head restraints and seats	Good	
Front crash prevention (Vehicle-to-Vehicle)	Superior	optional
Front crash prevention (Vehicle-to-Pedestrian, day)	Advanced	optional
Seat belt reminders	Acceptable	
Child seat anchors (LATCH) ease of use	Acceptable	

ANCAP test results Kia Cerato all variants except Cerato S & Cerato Sport (2019, aligned with Euro NCAP)
Test	Points	%
Overall:	5 /5 stars	
Adult occupant:	34.2	90%
Child occupant:	41	83%
Pedestrian:	34.6	72%
Safety assist:	9.4	73%

ANCAP test results Kia Cerato S & Sport variants only (2019, aligned with Euro NCAP)
Test	Points	%
Overall:	4 /5 stars	
Adult occupant:	34.2	90%
Child occupant:	41	83%
Pedestrian:	26.5	55%
Safety assist:	9.2	71%

ANCAP test results Kia Cerato all variants except Cerato S & Cerato Sport (2019, aligned with Euro NCAP)
Test	Points	%
Overall:	5 /5 stars	
Adult occupant:	34.2	90%
Child occupant:	41	83%
Pedestrian:	34.6	72%
Safety assist:	9.2	71%

ANCAP test results Kia Cerato S & Sport variants only (2019, aligned with Euro NCAP)
Test	Points	%
Overall:	4 /5 stars	
Adult occupant:	34.2	90%
Child occupant:	41	83%
Pedestrian:	26.5	55%
Safety assist:	9.2	71%

== Sales ==
Calendar year	United States	Canada	Mexico	South Korea	Australia	China		Global
Calendar year	United States	Canada	Mexico	South Korea	Australia	Forte	K3	Global
2009	26,327			51,374		48,298		
2010	68,500			43,486		105,750		
2011	76,294			34,389		128,278		
2012	75,681	14,856		41,995	7,881	80,989	26,849	352,226
2013	66,146	11,400		52,084		38,004	135,666	
2014	69,336	11,867		49,303		65,943	174,119	
2015	78,919	11,378	2,377	42,912		24,704	156,033	357,796
2016	103,292	12,296	12,900	36,854		7,615	193,408	400,010
2017	117,596	16,388	17,724	28,165	18,731	11,077	139,107	
2018	101,890	14,399	19,774	44,514	18,620	7,046	77,920	328,504
2019	95,609	15,549	19,977	44,387	21,757	10,162	38,827	
2020	84,997	14,373	13,180	23,437	17,559	20,094	28,753	237,688
2021	115,929		16,018	26,405	18,114		19,925	240,627
2022	108,424		11,503	21,021	12,354		13,583	
2023	123,953		11,812	13,204	5,795	25,038	5,805	
2024	139,778 (Note: Includes both K4 and Forte)		8,616	9,831	15,502	19,323	4,825	
2025						11,986	2,211	
