= Hyundai Alcazar =

Compact crossover SUV

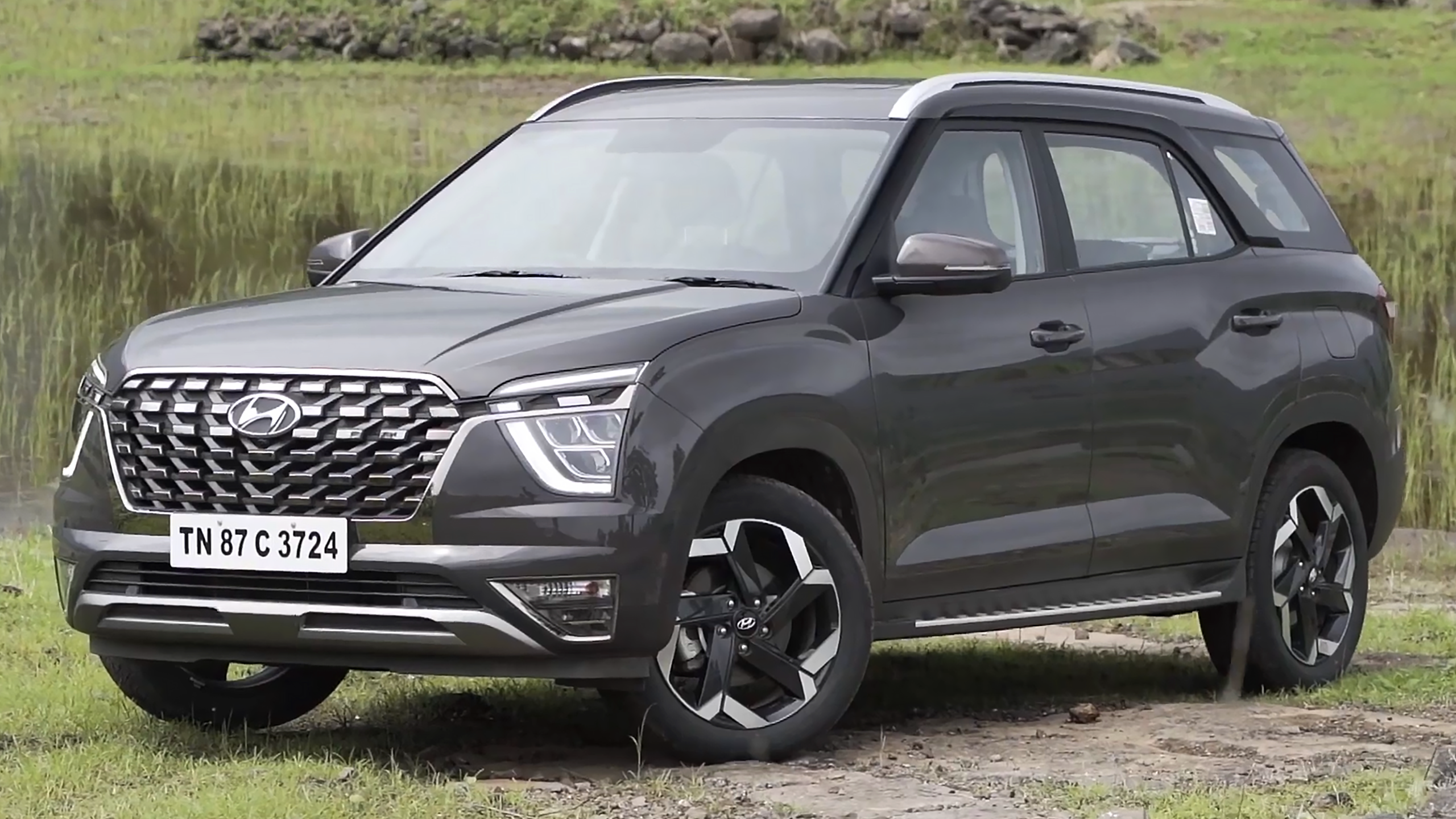
- 2021 Hyundai Alcazar 2.0 (India) (pre-facelift)

Overview
- Manufacturer: Hyundai
- Model code: SU2i LWB/PS7i
- Also called: Hyundai Grand Creta (South Africa, pre-facelift model); Hyundai Creta Grand (Middle East and Latin America); Hyundai Cantus Lux (Dominican Republic)
- Production: 2021–present
- Model years: 2023–present (Middle East)
- Assembly: India: Chennai (HMIL); Bangladesh: Kaliakair, Gazipur (FTL)
- Designer: Park Cho-hee

Body and chassis
- Class: Compact crossover SUV
- Body style: 5-door SUV
- Layout: Front-engine, front-wheel-drive
- Platform: Hyundai-Kia K2
- Related: Hyundai Creta (SU2); Hyundai Stargazer (KS); Kia Seltos (SP2i/SP2c); Kia Carens (KY)

Powertrain
- Engine: Petrol: 1.5 L Smartstream G1.5 T-GDi I4; 2.0 L Smartstream G2.0 MPi I4; Diesel: 1.5 L U II CRDi I4
- Transmission: 5-speed manual; 6-speed automatic; 7-speed DCT

Dimensions
- Wheelbase: 2,760 mm (108.7 in)
- Length: 4,500 mm (177.2 in) (Pre-facelift); 4,560 mm (179.5 in) (Facelift)
- Width: 1,790 mm (70.5 in) (Pre-facelift); 1,800 mm (70.9 in) (Facelift)
- Height: 1,670–1,675 mm (65.7–65.9 in) (Pre-facelift); 1,710 mm (67.3 in) (Facelift)
- Curb weight: 1,440 kg (3,175 lb) (petrol)

The Hyundai Alcazar is a compact crossover SUV with three-row seating produced by the South Korean manufacturer Hyundai in India. Introduced in April 2021, it is a long-wheelbase version of the subcompact Creta, whilst having additional third-row seating, styling changes, and a different powertrain option.

== Overview ==
The Alcazar was first unveiled on 8 April 2021, and was released to the market on 18 June 2021. It is based on the Creta, with a 150 mm (5.9 in) longer wheelbase at 2,760 mm (108.7 in), and a longer overall body by 200 mm (7.9 in). The longer body allows for a three-row seating, with 7-seater and 6-seater (with captain seats) options being offered. The vehicle is also introduced with a reworked front styling, and a larger 18-inch wheels.

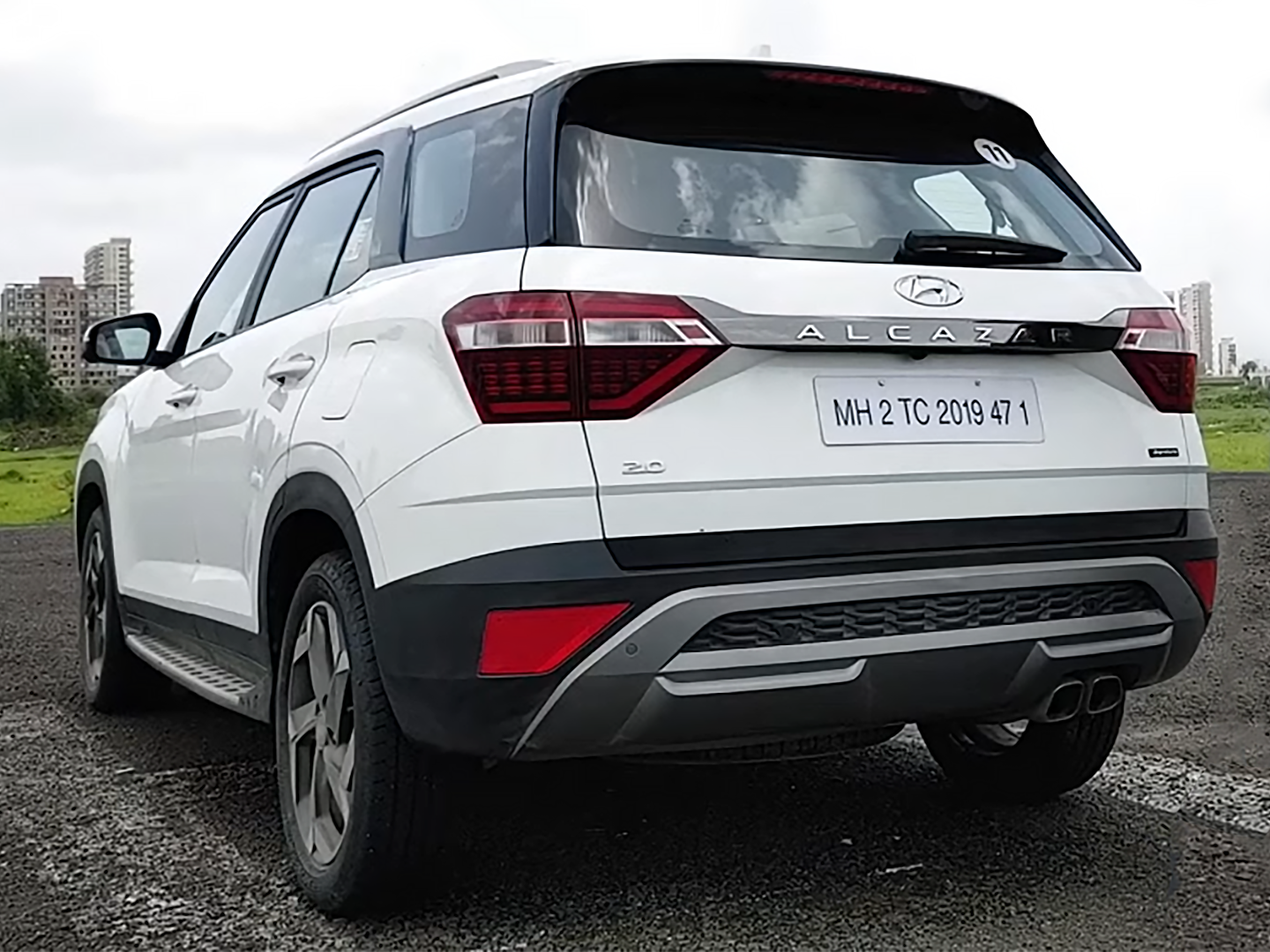
Rear view (pre-facelift)

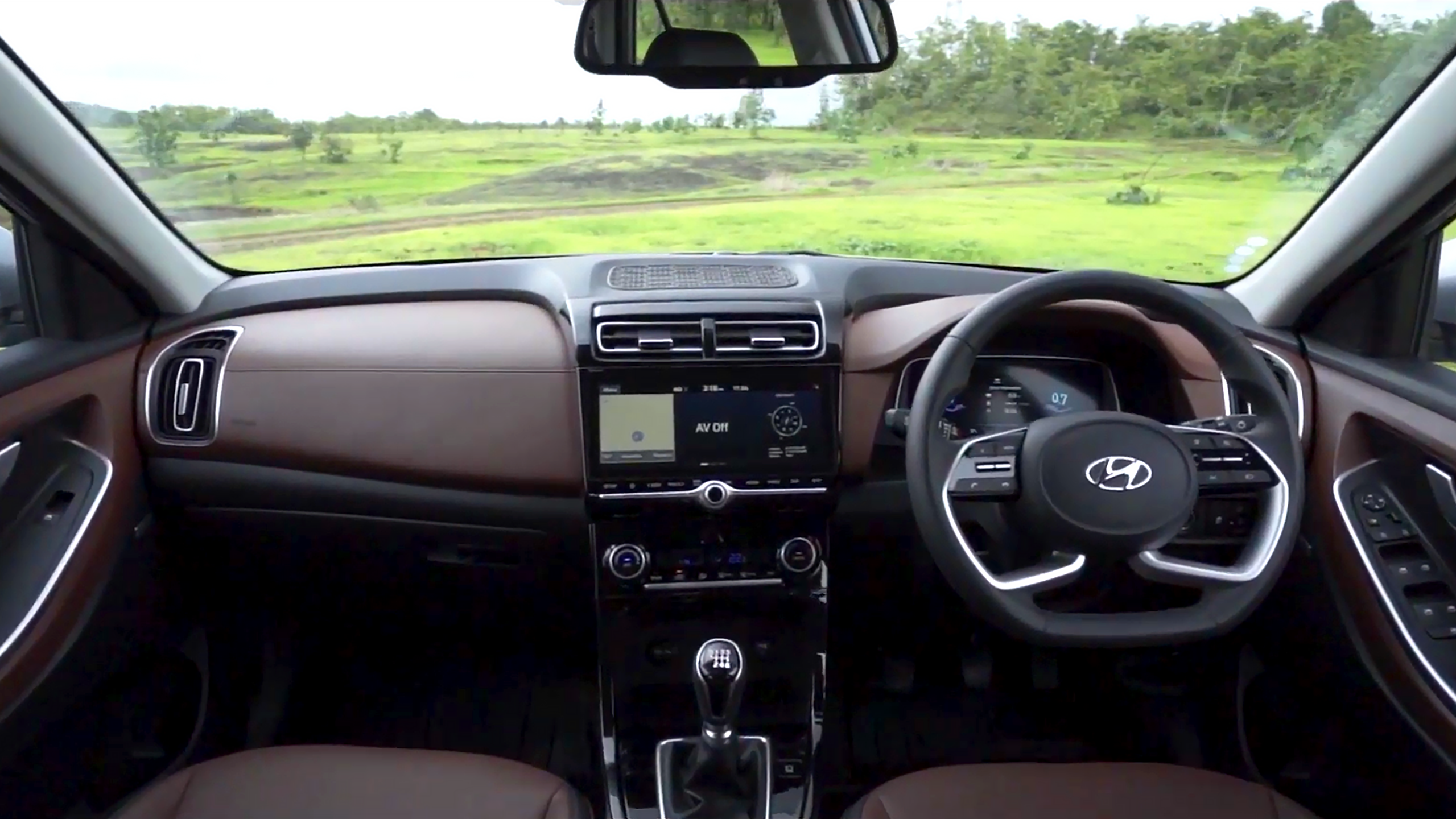
Interior (pre-facelift)

=== Facelift ===
The facelifted Alcazar was unveiled on 22 August 2024, with a refreshed design and upgraded features. The exterior updates include a redesigned front grille, a new front and rear fascia, and the addition of full-width LED headlights and taillights. In the interior, the cabin has a larger 10.25-inch touchscreen infotainment system, similar to the one found in the Creta. Additional interior updates include premium upholstery options, ambient lighting, and advanced driver-assistance features.

== Markets ==
=== India ===
In India, it is available in six variants: Prestige, Prestige (O), Platinum, Platinum (O), Signature, and Signature (O).

In March 2023, for the 2023 model year, Hyundai gave the Alcazar a minor facelift for the Indian market which included minor styling changes, a standard auto start-stop system, and a new 1.5-litre T-GDI turbocharged petrol engine to replace the existing 2.0-litre petrol engine, and additional safety features such as six airbags.

The facelifted model was launched on 9 September 2024. It is available in four variants: Executive, Prestige, Platinum and Signature. All variants comes standard with the 7-seater configuration, while the 6-seater configuration option (with captain seats) is available for the Platinum and Signature trims.

=== Mexico ===
The vehicle is marketed as the Creta Grand in Mexico and was launched on 14 October 2021. It is available in GLS Premium and Limited trim levels, powered by a 2.0-litre MPI petrol engine.

The facelifted model went on sale on 6 March 2025 as the 2026 model year, with trim levels and engine choice remain unchanged from the pre-facelift model.

=== Middle East ===
The Alcazar was launched in the Middle East in January 2023 as the Creta Grand. It is powered by the 2.0-litre petrol engine and 1.5-litre diesel engine, and it is available in three trim levels; Smart, Comfort and Ultimate.

The facelift model was launched on 21 January 2025.

=== South Africa ===
The vehicle is marketed as the Grand Creta in South Africa and was launched on 23 March 2022. It is available in Executive and Elite trim levels. For engines, both trims are available with either 2.0-litre MPI petrol or 1.5-litre CRDi turbocharged diesel engines.

The facelifted model is marketed as the Alcazar in South Africa and was launched on 8 May 2025. Compared to the pre-facelift model, the number of available variants was reduced from five to three, however, the trim level and engine choices from the pre-facelift model remain unchanged.

== Powertrain ==
The Alcazar is available with a 2.0-litre petrol engine and a 1.5-litre diesel, with the former has a claimed 0–100 km/h (0–62 mph) acceleration figure of 9.5 seconds. Both engine options are available with a choice between a 6-speed manual gearbox and a 6-speed automatic transmission.

For the 2023 model year minor facelift for the Indian market, a standard auto start-stop system was introduced, and a new 1,482 cc (1.5 L) 1.5 T-GDi turbo-petrol engine replaced the existing 2.0-litre Nu naturally-aspirated petrol engine. The new 1.5 T-GDi makes 160 PS (158 hp; 118 kW) of power and 253 N⋅m (187 lb⋅ft) of torque; 8 PS more power and 61 Nm more torque than the outgoing 2.0-litre petrol engine.

Engines
Petrol
Model	Years	Engine	Power	Torque	Transmissions
Smartstream G1.5 T-GDI	2023–present	1,482 cc (90.4 cu in) turbocharged I4	160 PS (118 kW; 158 hp) @ 5,500 rpm	253 N⋅m (25.8 kg⋅m; 187 lb⋅ft) @ 1,500–3,500 rpm	6-speed manual 7-speed DCT
Smartstream G2.0 MPI	2021–present	1,999 cc (122.0 cu in) I4	159 PS (117 kW; 157 hp) @ 6,500 rpm	191 N⋅m (19.5 kg⋅m; 141 lb⋅ft) @ 4,500 rpm	6-speed manual 6-speed automatic
Diesel
1.5 L U II CRDi VGT	2021–present	1,493 cc (91.1 cu in) turbocharged I4	115 PS (85 kW; 113 hp) @ 4,000 rpm	250 N⋅m (25.5 kg⋅m; 184 lb⋅ft) @ 1,500–2,750 rpm	6-speed manual 6-speed automatic

== Sales ==
FY	India	Export	Total production
FY2022	25,894	2,887	28,664
FY2023	26,696	11,334	38,394
FY2024	20,753	10,825	31,873
FY2025	2,163	2,130	4,312
Total	75,506	27,176	103,243

== See also ==
- List of Hyundai vehicles
