= Hyundai Smartstream engine =

Automobile engine

Smartstream engine

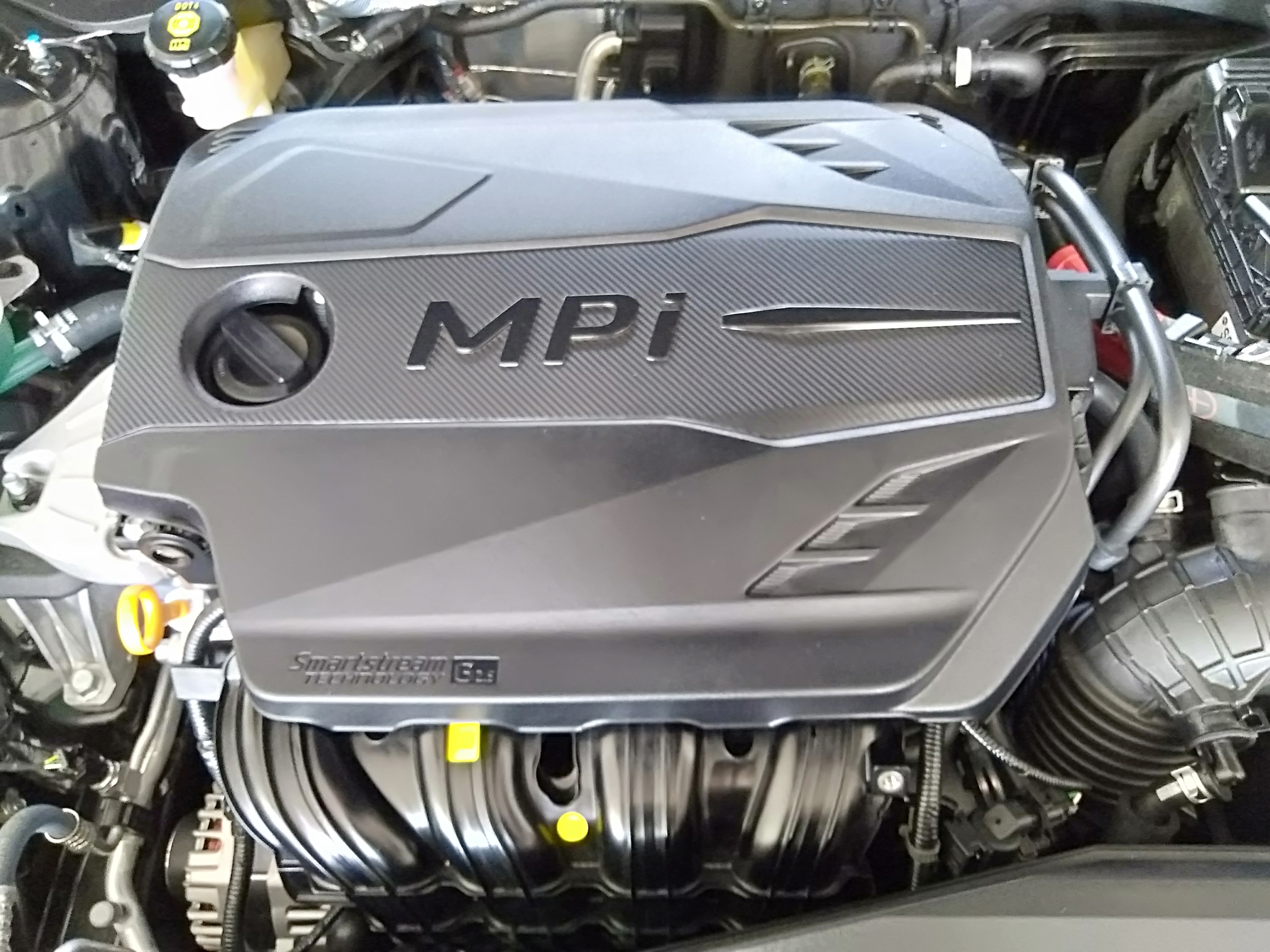
- 2021 Hyundai Sonata Smartstream G2.5 MPi engine

Overview
- Manufacturer: Hyundai Motor Company
- Production: 2018–present

Layout
- Configuration: Inline-three; Inline-four; Inline-six; V6
- Displacement: 60.9 cu in (998 cc); 73.0 cu in (1,197 cc); 85.2 cu in (1,396 cc); 90.4 cu in (1,482 cc); 91.1 cu in (1,493 cc); 91.2 cu in (1,495 cc); 91.4 cu in (1,497 cc); 91.4 cu in (1,498 cc); 96.4 cu in (1,580 cc); 97.5 cu in (1,598 cc); 120.5 cu in (1,975 cc); 122.0 cu in (1,999 cc); 131.3 cu in (2,151 cc); 152.4 cu in (2,497 cc); 182.8 cu in (2,996 cc); 211.6 cu in (3,468 cc)
- Cylinder bore: 71 mm (2.8 in) (1.0L/1.2L); 71.6 mm (2.82 in) (1.4L/1.5L); 72 mm (2.8 in) (1.5L/1.6L HEV); 75.6 mm (2.98 in) (1.5L/1.6L); 77 mm (3.0 in) (1.6L); 80.5 mm (3.17 in) (2.0 T-GDi); 81 mm (3.2 in) (1.8L/2.0L); 83 mm (3.3 in) (2.0L/2.2L/3.0L); 88.5 mm (3.48 in) (2.5L); 92 mm (3.6 in) (3.5L)
- Piston stroke: 75.6 mm (2.98 in) (1.2L); 83.38 mm (3.283 in) (1.5L); 84 mm (3.3 in) (1.0L/1.4L); 85.8 mm (3.38 in) (1.6L); 87 mm (3.4 in) (3.5L); 87.2 mm (3.43 in) (1.8L); 89 mm (3.5 in) (1.6L); 92 mm (3.6 in) (1.5L); 92.3 mm (3.63 in) (2.0L/3.0L); 97 mm (3.8 in) (1.6L HEV/2.0L); 99.4 mm (3.91 in) (2.2L); 101.5 mm (4.00 in) (2.5L)
- Cylinder block material: Aluminium
- Cylinder head material: Aluminium
- Valvetrain: DOHC
- Compression ratio: 10.0:1–16.0:1

Combustion
- Fuel system: MPi; GDi; CRDi
- Fuel type: Unleaded gasoline; LPG; Diesel
- Cooling system: Watercooled

Output
- Power output: 76–415 PS (75–409 hp; 56–305 kW)
- Torque output: 9.7–60 kg⋅m (95–588 N⋅m; 70–434 lbf⋅ft)

Emissions
- Emissions target standard: Euro 6

Chronology
- Predecessor: Kappa (for Smartstream G1.0/G1.0T/G1.2/G1.4T/G1.5/G1.5T/G1.6HEV); Gamma (for Smartstream G1.6/G1.6T); Nu (for Smartstream G2.0/L2.0); Theta (for Smartstream G2.5/G2.5T); Lambda (for Smartstream G3.5/G3.5T/L3.5); U-Line (for Smartstream D1.5/D1.6); R-Line (for Smartstream D2.0/D2.2); S-Line (for Smartstream D3.0)

The Hyundai Smartstream is a gasoline and diesel automobile engine branding used by Hyundai since 2018. An all-aluminum engine of Hyundai Motor Company debuted in the third-generation Hyundai i30 hatchback (codenamed PD), which was unveiled in 2018 at the Paris Motor Show.

== Gasoline engines ==
=== Smartstream G1.0 (G3LD) ===
The Smartstream G1.0 MPI is a naturally aspirated 998 cc (1.0 L) inline 3-cylinder engine with multi-port injection (MPi); the engine makes 76 PS (75 hp; 56 kW) at 6,200 rpm and 9.7 kg⋅m (70 lb⋅ft; 95 N⋅m) of torque at 3,750 rpm.

Compared to the Kappa II 1.0 MPi predecessor, improvements include using dual port injectors for each cylinder and replacing the thermostat with an integrated temperature controlled valve (ITM).

Applications

- Hyundai Casper (AX1) (2021–present)
- Hyundai i10 (AC3) (2020–present)
- Kia Picanto/Morning (JA) (2020–present)

=== Smartstream G1.0T (G3LE/G3LF) ===
The Smartstream G1.0 T-GDI (G3LE) is a turbocharged inline 3-cylinder engine with gasoline direct injection (GDi); the engine makes 120 PS (118 hp; 88 kW) at 6,000 rpm and 17.5 kg⋅m (127 lb⋅ft; 172 N⋅m) of torque between 1,500 and 4,000 rpm. A detuned version with 100 PS (99 hp; 74 kW) between 4,500 and 6,000 rpm is also available for some applications.

The Smartstream G1.0 T-GDI (G3LF) adds CVVD and mild hybrid support to the G3LE engine.

Applications

- Hyundai Bayon (BC3 CUV) (2021–present)
- Hyundai i10 (AC3) (2020–present)
- Hyundai i20 (BC3) (2020–present)
- Hyundai i30 (PD) (2020–present)
- Hyundai Kona (OS) (2020–2023)
- Hyundai Kona (SX2) (2023–present)
- Kia Ceed (CD) (2020–present)
- Kia K4 (2025–present)
- Kia Picanto (JA) (2020–present)
- Kia Stonic (YB CUV) (2020–present)
- Kia Syros (AY) (2025–present)

=== Smartstream G1.2 (G4LF) ===
The Smartstream G1.2 MPI is a naturally aspirated 1,197 cc (1.2 L) inline 4-cylinder engine with MPi; the engine makes 83 PS (82 hp; 61 kW) at 6,300 rpm and 11.7–12 kg⋅m (85–87 lb⋅ft; 115–118 N⋅m) of torque at 4,200 rpm.

Compared to the Kappa II 1.2 MPi predecessor, improvements include using dual port injectors for each cylinder and replacing the thermostat with an integrated temperature controlled valve (ITM).

Applications

- Hyundai Bayon (BC3 CUV) (2021–present)
- Hyundai Exter (AI3 CUV) (2023–present)
- Hyundai i20 (BC3) (2020–present)
- Kia Picanto (JA) (2020–present)
- Kia Rio (YB) (2020–present)
- Kia Sonet (QY) (2020–present)
- Kia Stonic (YB CUV) (2020–present)

=== Smartstream G1.4T (G4LD) ===
The Smartstream G1.4 T-GDI is a turbocharged inline 4-cylinder engine with GDi; the engine makes 140 PS (138 hp; 103 kW) at 6,000 rpm and 24.7 kg⋅m (179 lb⋅ft; 242 N⋅m) of torque between 1,500 and 3,200 rpm.

Applications

- Hyundai Elantra (CN7) (2020–present)
- Hyundai Creta (SU2i) (2020-2023)
- Kia Carens (KY) (2022–present)
- Kia Seltos (SP2i) (2019–2023)

=== Smartstream G1.5 (G4FL/G4LG) ===
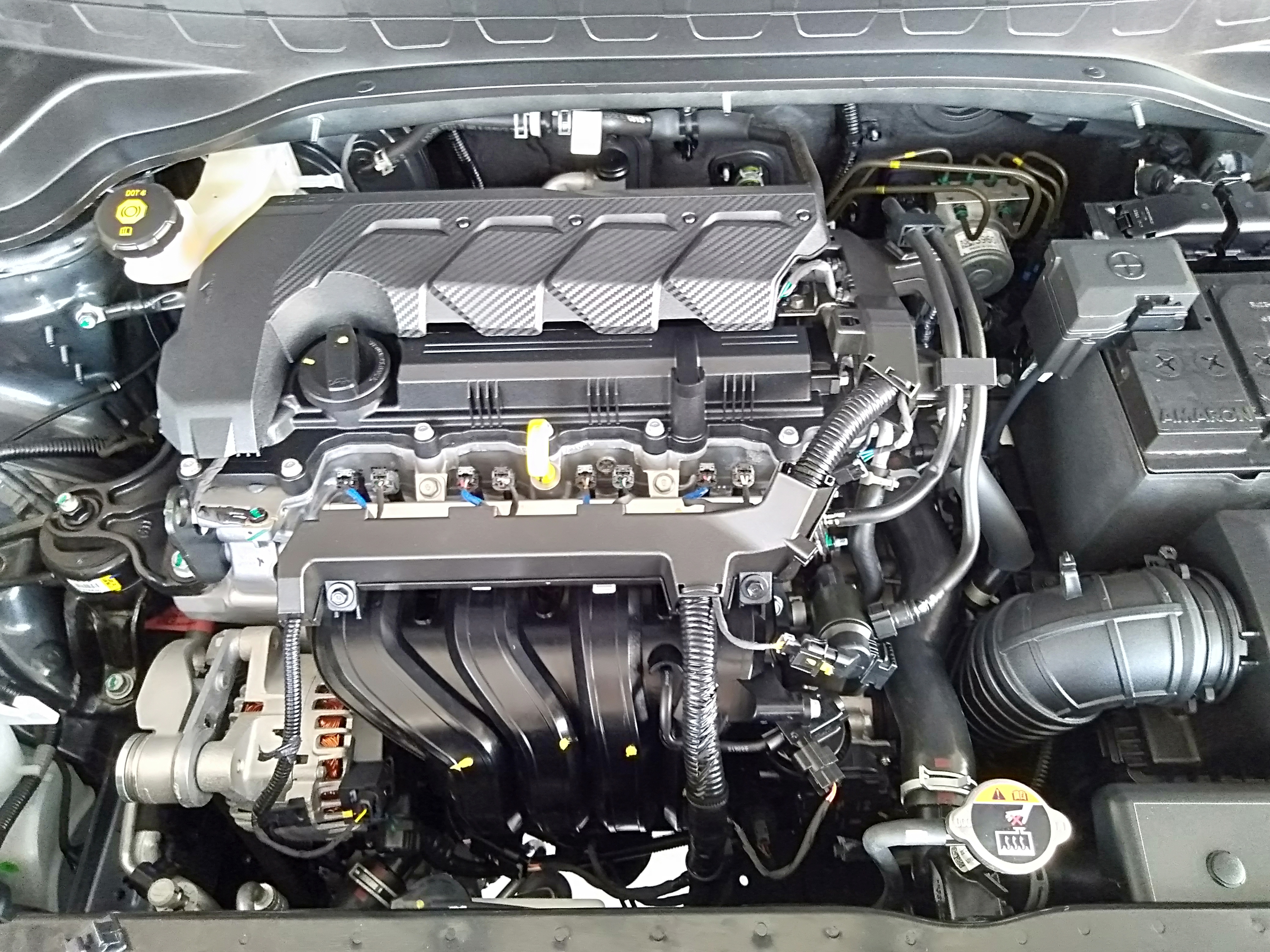
2021 Kia Sonet 1.5 engine (Asia)

The Smartstream G1.5 MPi (G4FL) is a naturally aspirated 1,497 cc (1.5 L) inline 4-cylinder engine that carries a bore and stroke of 75.6 mm and 83.4 mm respectively and a 10.5:1 compression ratio; it makes 115 PS (85 kW; 113 hp) at 6,300 rpm and 14.7 kg⋅m (144 N⋅m; 106 lbf⋅ft) of torque at 4,500 rpm. Developed from the Gamma family, it is also marketed as the 1.5 Smartstream Gamma II engine.

The Smartstream G1.5 DPi (G4LG) is a naturally aspirated 1,498 cc (1.5 L) inline 4-cylinder engine with both GDi and MPi from the Kappa family; it makes 110 PS (81 kW; 108 hp) at 6,000 rpm and 14.7 kg⋅m (144 N⋅m; 106 lbf⋅ft) of torque at 3,500 rpm. It is produced by Kia Slovakia in Žilina.

Applications (G4FL)

- Hyundai Accent/Verna (HCi) (2020–present)
- Hyundai Creta/ix25 (SU2c/SU2i/SU2id) (2019–present)
- Hyundai Elantra (CN7) (2020–present)
- Hyundai Elantra (AD) (China only; 2016–2021)
- Hyundai Stargazer (KS) (2022–present)
- Hyundai Verna (BN7) (2023–present)
- Kia Carens (KY) (2022–present)
- Kia K3 (BD) (2018–present)
- Kia Seltos/KX3 (SP2i/SP2c) (2019–present)
- Kia Sonet (QY) (2020–present)

Applications (G4LG)

- Hyundai i30 (PD) (2020–present)

=== Smartstream G1.5T (G4LH/G4LK/G4FS) ===
1,5 T-GDi Smartstream engine in KIA Ceed SW (2023 market in Europe)

The Smartstream G1.5 T-GDI (G4LH) is a turbocharged 1,482 cc (1.5 L) inline 4-cylinder engine with GDi from the Kappa family that carries a bore and stroke of 71.6 mm and 92 mm respectively and a 10.5:1 compression ratio; it makes 160 PS (118 kW; 158 hp) at 5,500 rpm and 25.8 kg⋅m (253 N⋅m; 187 lbf⋅ft) of torque between 1,500 and 3,000 rpm. It is produced by Kia Slovakia in Žilina.

The Smartstream G1.5 T-GDI (G4LK) adds CVVD and mild hybrid support to the G4LH engine.

The Smartstream G1.5 T-GDI (G4FS) is a turbocharged 1,497 cc (1.5 L) inline 4-cylinder engine with GDi that carries a bore and stroke of 75.6 mm and 83.4 mm respectively and a 10.5:1 compression ratio; it makes 170 PS (125 kW; 168 hp) at 5,500 rpm and 25.8 kg⋅m (253 N⋅m; 187 lbf⋅ft) of torque between 1,500 and 4,000 rpm. A high output version that makes 200 PS (147 kW; 197 hp) at 6,000 rpm and 25.8 kg⋅m (253 N⋅m; 187 lbf⋅ft) of torque between 2,200 and 4,000 rpm is also available for some applications. The engine is based on the Smartstream G1.5 MPi (G4FL) engine from the Gamma family, and mainly used in the Chinese market.

Applications (G4LH)

- Hyundai Alcazar (SU2 LWB) (2023–present)
- Hyundai Creta (SU2i) (2024–present)
- Hyundai i30 (PD) (2020–present)
- Hyundai Verna (BN7) (2023–present)
- Kia Ceed (CD) (2020–present)
- Kia Carens (KY) (2023–present)
- Kia Seltos (SP2i) (2023–present)

Applications (G4FS)

- Hyundai Custo/Custin (KU) (2021–present)
- Hyundai Lafesta N-Line (SQ) (2022–present)
- Hyundai Mistra (DU2) (2020–present)
- Hyundai Sonata (DN8) (2020–present)
- Hyundai Tucson (NX4) (2021–present)
- Kia K5 (DL3) (2020–present)
- Kia Sportage Ace (NP) (2021–present)

=== Smartstream G1.6 (G4FM) ===
The Smartstream G1.6 MPi (G4FM) is a 1,598 cc (97.5 cu in) engine with 11.2:1 compression ratio, the engine makes 123 PS (90 kW; 121 hp) at 6,300 rpm and 15.7 kg⋅m (154 N⋅m; 114 lbf⋅ft) of torque at 4,500 rpm.

The Smartstream G1.6 DPi makes 122 PS (90 kW; 120 hp) at 6,300 rpm and 15.6 kg⋅m (153 N⋅m; 113 lbf⋅ft) of torque at 4,500 rpm.

It features technologies such as CVVT (Continuously Variable Valve Timing), DPFI (Dual-Port Fuel Injection), HTCS (High Tumble Combustion System), ITMS (Integrated Thermal Management System).

Applications (MPi)

- Hyundai Elantra (AD) (2018–2020)
- Hyundai Elantra (CN7) (2020–present)
- Hyundai Venue (QX) (2019–present)
- Kia Forte/Cerato/K3 (BD) (2018–present)
- Kia K3 (BL7) (2023–present)

Applications (DPi)

- Hyundai Accent/Verna (HC) (2019–2022)
- Hyundai Venue (QX) (2019–present)

=== Smartstream G1.6T (G4FP (G4FV Hyundai i20N)) ===
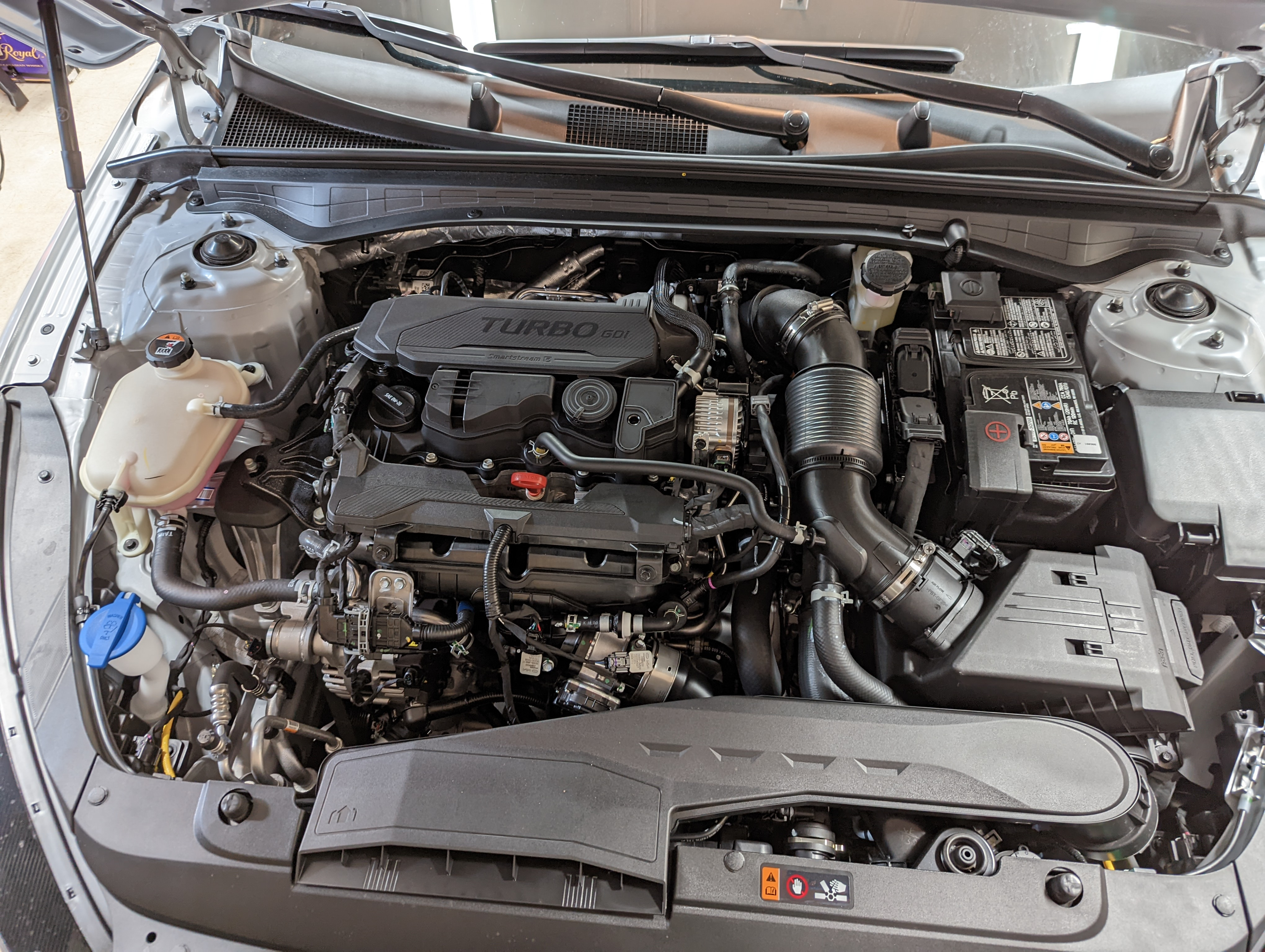
Smartstream G1.6T (G4FP) engine in a 2022 Kia K5 GT Line AWD (US Market)

The Smartstream G1.6 T-GDI replaced the 1.6 Gamma T-GDI engine. It is a 1,598 cc (97.5 cu in) turbocharged inline 4-cylinder engine with GDi that carries a bore and stroke of 75.6 mm and 89 mm respectively and a 10.0(±0.2):1 compression ratio. This is the world's first production engine to use Continuously Variable Valve Duration (CVVD) technology, allowing it to adjust how long its intake valves remain open independently of timing and lift. Hyundai claims a 4% increase in performance, 5% increase in efficiency, and a 12% decrease in tailpipe emissions due to this technology.

The engine makes 180 PS (178 hp; 132 kW) at 5,500 rpm with 27 kg⋅m (195 lb⋅ft; 265 N⋅m) of torque between 1,500 and 4,500 rpm. Higher output versions that makes 192.6 PS (190 hp; 142 kW) at 6,000 rpm with 27 kg⋅m (195 lb⋅ft; 265 N⋅m) of torque between 1,600 and 4,500 rpm or 204 PS (201 hp; 150 kW) at 6,000 rpm with 28 kg⋅m (203 lb⋅ft; 275 N⋅m) of torque between 1,500 and 4,500 rpm are also available depending on application.

Applications

- Hyundai Elantra (CN7) (2020–present)
- Hyundai Kona (OS) (2020–2023)
- Hyundai Kona (SX2) (2023–present)
- Hyundai Sonata (DN8) (2019–present)
- Hyundai Tucson (NX4) (2020–present)
- Hyundai i20 N (BC3) (2021–present)
- Kia K4 (2025–present)
- Kia K5 (DL3) (2019–present)
- Kia Seltos (SP2) (2022–present)
- Kia Sportage (NQ5) (2021–present)

=== Smartstream G2.0 (G4NJ/G4NL/G4NM/G4NS) ===
The Smartstream G2.0 MPi (G4NJ/G4NL) is an inline 4-cylinder engine with MPi and a 10.3:1 compression ratio; the engine makes 152 PS (150 hp; 112 kW) at 6,200 rpm and 19.6 kg⋅m (142 lb⋅ft; 192 N⋅m) of torque at 4,000 rpm. It is an update of the Hyundai Nu Engine

The Smartstream G2.0 MPi CVVL (G4NM) adds CVVL to the G2.0 MPi engine; the engine makes 160 PS (158 hp; 118 kW) at 6,500 rpm and 20 kg⋅m (145 lb⋅ft; 196 N⋅m) of torque at 4,800 rpm.

The Smartstream G2.0 MPi Atkinson Cycle (G4NS) is an inline 4-cylinder engine with MPi and a 12.5:1 compression ratio; the engine makes 149 PS (147 hp; 110 kW) at 6,200 rpm and 18.3 kg⋅m (132 lb⋅ft; 179 N⋅m) of torque at 4,500 rpm.

Applications (G4NJ/G4NL)

- Hyundai Alcazar (SU2 LWB) (2021–present)
- Hyundai Creta (SU2b) (2021–present)
- Hyundai Elantra (CN7) (2020–present)
- Hyundai Sonata (DN8) (2019–present)
- Hyundai Tucson (NX4) (2021–present)
- Kia K5 (DL3) (2019–present)
- Kia Sportage (NQ5) (2021–present)

Applications (G4NM)

- Hyundai Mufasa (NU2) (2023–present)
- Hyundai Sonata (DN8) (2019–present)
- Kia K5 (DL3) (2019–present)

Applications (G4NS)

- Hyundai Elantra (CN7) (2020–present)
- Hyundai Kona (OS) (2020–2023)
- Hyundai Kona (SX2) (2023–present)

=== Smartstream G2.0T (G4NN) ===
The Smartstream G2.0 T-GDi is a turbocharged inline 4-cylinder engine with GDi; the engine makes 233–247 PS (230–244 hp; 171–182 kW) at 6,000 rpm and 36 kg⋅m (260 lb⋅ft; 353 N⋅m) of torque between 1,500 and 4,000–4,500 rpm. It is built by Hyundai Wia Shandong.

Applications

- Hyundai Custo/Custin (KU) (2021–present)
- Hyundai Santa Fe (TM) (2020–2024)
- Hyundai Santa Fe (MX5) (2024–present)
- Hyundai Sonata (DN8) (2019–present)
- Kia Carnival (KA4) (2021–present)
- Kia K5 (DL3) (2020–present)
- Kia Sportage (NQ5) (2021–present)

=== Smartstream G2.5 (G4KM/G4KN) ===
Comes in two versions, 2.5 MPi (G4KM) and 2.5 GDi (G4KN), Bore is 88.5 mm (3.48 in) with a 101.5 mm (4.00 in) stroke.

The Smartstream G2.5 MPi is an inline 4-cylinder engine with multi-port injection and a 10.5:1 compression ratio; the engine makes 179.5 PS (177 hp; 132 kW) at 6,000 rpm and 23.7 kg⋅m (171 lb⋅ft; 232 N⋅m) of torque at 4,000 rpm.

The Smartstream G2.5 GDi is an inline 4-cylinder engine with both direct and multi-port injection and a 13.0:1 compression ratio; the engine makes 194 PS (191 hp; 143 kW) at 6,100 rpm and 25 kg⋅m (181 lb⋅ft; 245 N⋅m) of torque at 4,000 rpm in the Sonata, for the Azera and Cadenza the engine makes 198 PS (195 hp; 146 kW) at 6,100 rpm and 25.3 kg⋅m (183 lb⋅ft; 248 N⋅m) of torque at 4,000 rpm.

Applications (G4KM)

- Hyundai Santa Fe (TM) (2020–present)
- Hyundai Sonata (DN8) (2019–present)
- Kia Sorento (MQ4) (2020–present)

Applications (G4KN)

- Hyundai Grandeur/Azera (IG) (2019–2022)
- Hyundai Grandeur/Azera (GN7) (2022–present)
- Hyundai Santa Cruz (2021–present)
- Hyundai Santa Fe (TM) (2020–2023)
- Hyundai Santa Fe (MX5) (2023–present)
- Hyundai Sonata (DN8) (2019–present)
- Hyundai Tucson (NX4) (2020–present)
- Kia K5 (DL3) (2019–present)
- Kia K8 (GL3) (2021–present)
- Kia Sorento (MQ4) (2020–present)
- Kia Sportage (NQ5) (2021–present)

=== Smartstream G2.5T (G4KP) ===
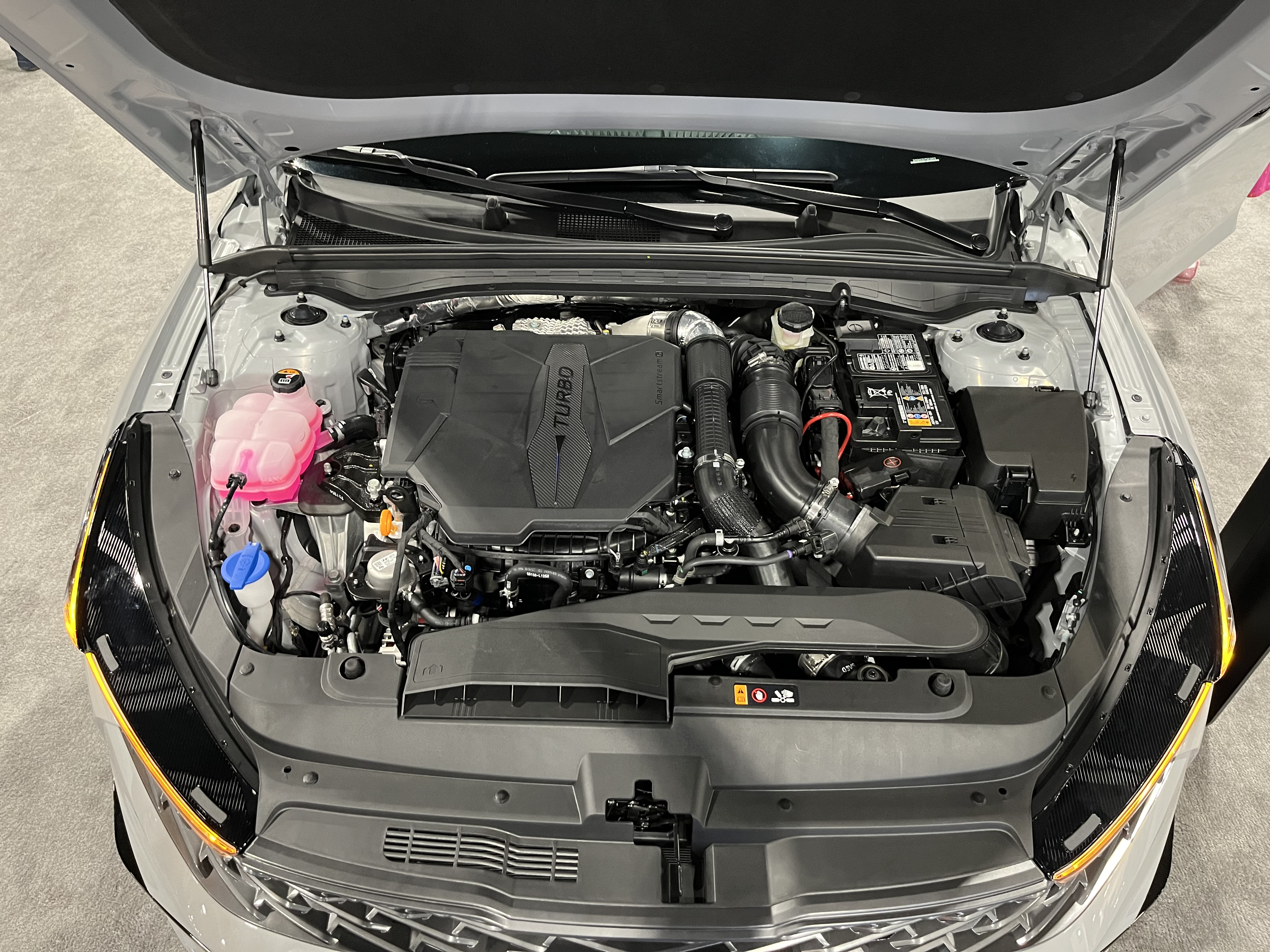
Smartstream G2.5 T-GDi (G4KP) engine in a 2023 Kia K5 GT (US Market)

The Smartstream G2.5 T-GDi is a turbocharged inline 4-cylinder engine with both GDi and MPi for FWD applications, the engine makes 281 PS (277 hp; 207 kW) at 6,000 rpm and 43 kg⋅m (311 lb⋅ft; 422 N⋅m) of torque between 1,750 and 4,000 rpm for SUV applications with a 10.0:1 compression ratio while it makes 290–294 PS (286–290 hp; 213–216 kW) at 5,800 rpm and 43 kg⋅m (311 lb⋅ft; 422 N⋅m) of torque between 1,650 and 4,000 rpm for other applications with a 10.5:1 compression ratio.

Applications

- Hyundai Palisade (LX3) (2024–present)
- Hyundai Santa Cruz (2021–present)
- Hyundai Santa Fe (TM) (2020–2023)
- Hyundai Santa Fe (MX5) (2023–present)
- Hyundai Sonata (DN8) (2020–present)
- Kia K5 (DL3) (2020–present)
- Kia Sorento (MQ4) (2020–present)
- Kia Telluride (LQ2) (2026–present)

=== Smartstream FR G2.5T (G4KR) ===
The Smartstream G2.5 FR T-GDi. is a turbocharged inline 4-cylinder engine for RWD applications with both GDi and MPi and a 10.5:1 compression ratio; the engine makes 304 PS (300 hp; 224 kW) at 6,000 rpm and 43 kg⋅m (311 lb⋅ft; 422 N⋅m) of torque between 1,650 and 4,000 rpm. A detuned version with 281 PS (277 hp; 207 kW) at 5,800 rpm is used for the Kia Tasman.

Applications

- Genesis G70 (IK) (2023–present)
- Genesis G80 (RG3) (2020–present)
- Genesis GV70 (JK1) (2020–present)
- Genesis GV80 (JX1) (2020–present)
- Kia Stinger (CK) (2020–2023)
- Kia Tasman (TK) (2025-present)

=== Smartstream G3.5 (G6DT/G6DU) ===
The Smartstream G3.5 is a V6 for FWD based applications. Bore is 92 mm (3.6 in) with a 87 mm (3.4 in) stroke.

The Smartstream G3.5 GDi (G6DT) compression ratio is 12.3:1 and makes 294 PS (290 hp; 216 kW) at 6,400 rpm and 36.2 kg⋅m (262 lb⋅ft; 355 N⋅m) of torque at 5,200 rpm, for the Kia K8 application it makes 300 PS (296 hp; 221 kW) at 6,400 rpm and 36.6 kg⋅m (265 lb⋅ft; 359 N⋅m) of torque at 5,000 rpm.

The Smartstream G3.5 MPi (G6DU) makes 272 PS (268 hp; 200 kW) at 6,400 rpm and 33.8 kg⋅m (244 lb⋅ft; 331 N⋅m) of torque at 5,000 rpm.

Applications (G6DT)

- Hyundai Grandeur/Azera (GN7) (2022–present)
- Hyundai Palisade (LX3) (2025–present)
- Kia Carnival (KA4) (2020–present)
- Kia K8 (GL3) (2021–present)

Applications (G6DU)

- Hyundai Santa Fe (TM) (2020–present)
- Hyundai Staria (US4) (2021–present)
- Kia Carnival (KA4) (2020–present)
- Kia Sorento (MQ4) (2020–present)

=== Smartstream FR G3.5T (G6DS) ===
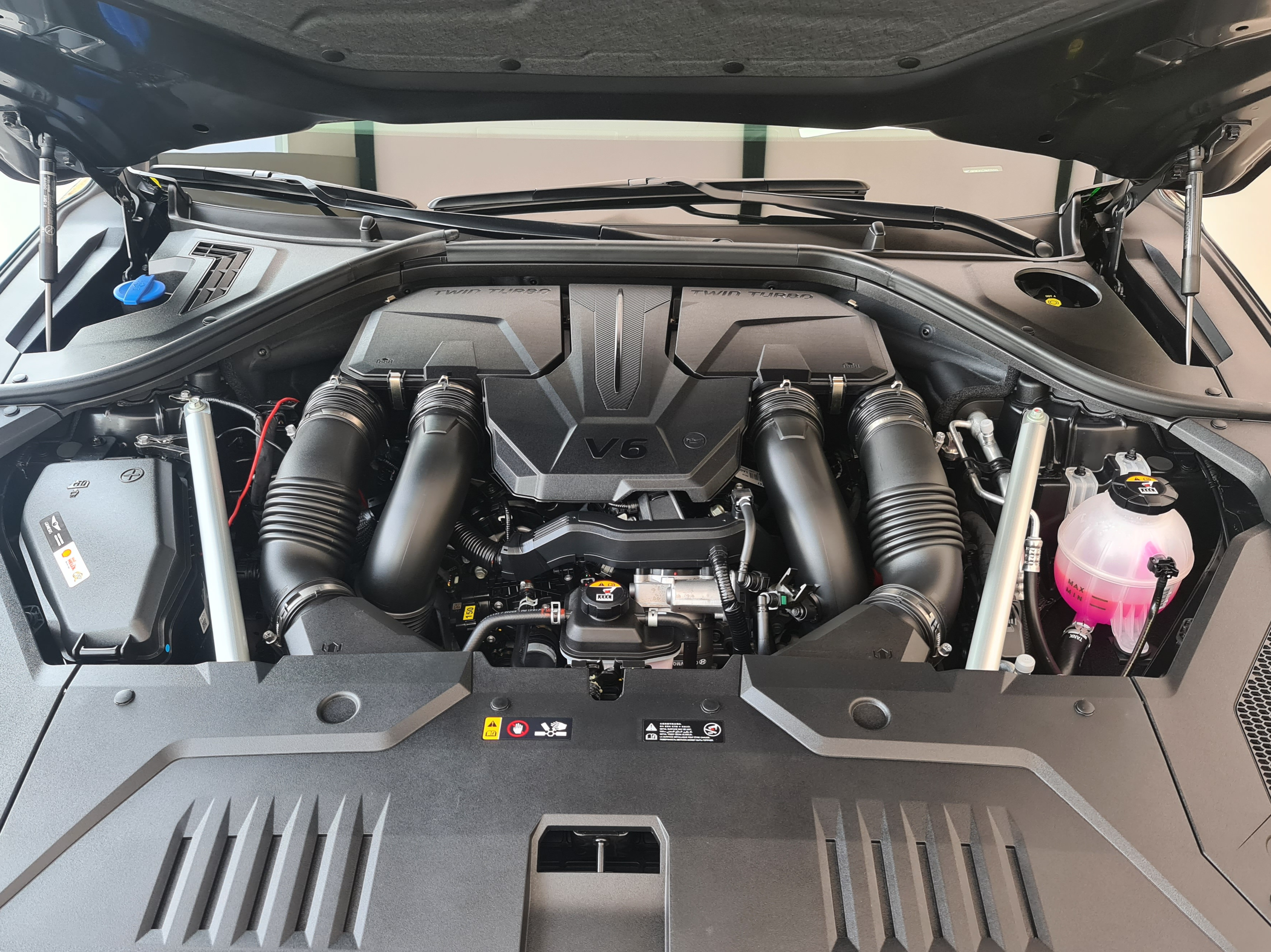
Smartstream G3.5 T-GDi engine

The Smartstream G3.5 FR T-GDI is a twin turbocharged 6-cylinder engine for RWD applications with an 11.0:1 compression ratio; the engine makes 380 PS (375 hp; 279 kW) at 6,000 rpm and 54 kg⋅m (391 lb⋅ft; 530 N⋅m) of torque between 1,300 and 4,500 rpm.

Compared to the 3.3L Lambda II RS T-GDi predecessor, peak power is up by 10 PS (9.9 hp; 7.4 kW) while the peak torque is up by 2 kg⋅m (14.5 lb⋅ft; 19.6 N⋅m), at the same time fuel economy is improved by 6.1%, this engine replaces the GDi only fuel injection to dual fuel injection technology that combines the advantages of the GDi system that directly injects fuel into the combustion chamber and the MPi system that injects the inlet port of the combustion chamber. The thermostat was upgraded to an ITM unit and the high pressure pump pressure was increased from 200 bar to 250 bar. The intercooler was upgraded to a water-cooled unit from an air cooler unit, which increases the unique responsiveness of the turbocharger. Finally the Smartstream FR G3.5T is rated ULEV50 for emissions versus the ULEV70 rating for the 3.3L Lambda II RS T-GDi.

This engine is currently exclusive to Genesis, a subsidiary of Hyundai.

Applications

- Genesis G80 (RG3) (2020–present)
- Genesis GV70 (JK1) (2020–present)
- Genesis GV80 (JX1) (2020–present)
- Genesis G90 (RS4) (2021–present)

=== Smartstream FR G3.5T e-S/C (G6DV) ===
Similar to the Smartstream G3.5 FR T-GDI but with an additional 48V electric supercharger; the engine makes 415 PS (409 hp; 305 kW) at 5,800 rpm and 56 kg⋅m (405 lb⋅ft; 549 N⋅m) of torque between 1,300 and 4,500 rpm.

Applications

- Genesis G90 (RS4) (2022–present)
- Genesis GV80 Coupe (JX1) (2023–present)

== Hybrid engines ==
=== Smartstream G1.6 Hybrid/Plug-in Hybrid (G4LE/G4LL) ===
The Smartstream G1.6 GDI Hybrid (G4LE) combines a Smartstream G1.6 engine producing 105 PS (104 hp; 77 kW) at 5,700 rpm and 15 kg⋅m (147 N⋅m; 108 lb⋅ft) at 4,000 rpm, 44 PS (43 hp; 32 kW) 17.3 kg⋅m (170 N⋅m; 125 lb⋅ft) electric motor and a 1.32KWh battery for a total combined system power of 141 PS (139 hp; 104 kW) @ 5,700 rpm with 27 kg⋅m (265 N⋅m; 195 lb⋅ft) of torque.

The Smartstream G1.6 GDI Plug-in Hybrid (G4LE) combines a Smartstream G1.6 engine, 60 PS (59 hp; 44 kW) 17.3 kg⋅m (170 N⋅m; 125 lb⋅ft) electric motor and a 12.9KWh battery.

The Smartstream G1.6 GDI Hybrid (G4LL) combines a Smartstream G1.6 engine producing 105 PS (104 hp; 77 kW) at 5,700 rpm and 14.7 kg⋅m (144 N⋅m; 106 lb⋅ft) at 4,000 rpm, 57 PS (56 hp; 42 kW) electric motor and a 1.32KWh battery for a total combined system power of 141 PS (139 hp; 104 kW) @ 5,700 rpm with 27 kg⋅m (265 N⋅m; 195 lb⋅ft) of torque @ 4,400 rpm.

The Smartstream G1.6 GDI Plug-in Hybrid (G4LL) combines a Smartstream G1.6 engine producing 105 PS (104 hp; 77 kW) at 5,700 rpm and 14.7 kg⋅m (144 N⋅m; 106 lb⋅ft) at 4,000 rpm, 113 PS (111 hp; 83 kW) 20.7 kg⋅m (203 N⋅m; 150 lb⋅ft) electric motor and a 11.1KWh battery for a total combined system power of 182 PS (180 hp; 134 kW) @ 5,700 rpm with 27 kg⋅m (265 N⋅m; 195 lb⋅ft) of torque @ 4,400 rpm.

Applications (G4LE)

- Hyundai Elantra Lingdong PHEV (2016–2021)
- Hyundai Elantra Hybrid (CN7) (2020–present)
- Hyundai Kona (OS) (2020–2023)
- Kia K3 Hybrid (BD) (2020–present)
- Kia Niro Hybrid (DE) (2016–2021)

Applications (G4LL)

- Hyundai Kona (SX2) (2023–present)
- Kia Niro Hybrid (SG2) (2021–present)

=== Smartstream G1.6T Hybrid/Plug-in Hybrid (G4FT/G4FU) ===
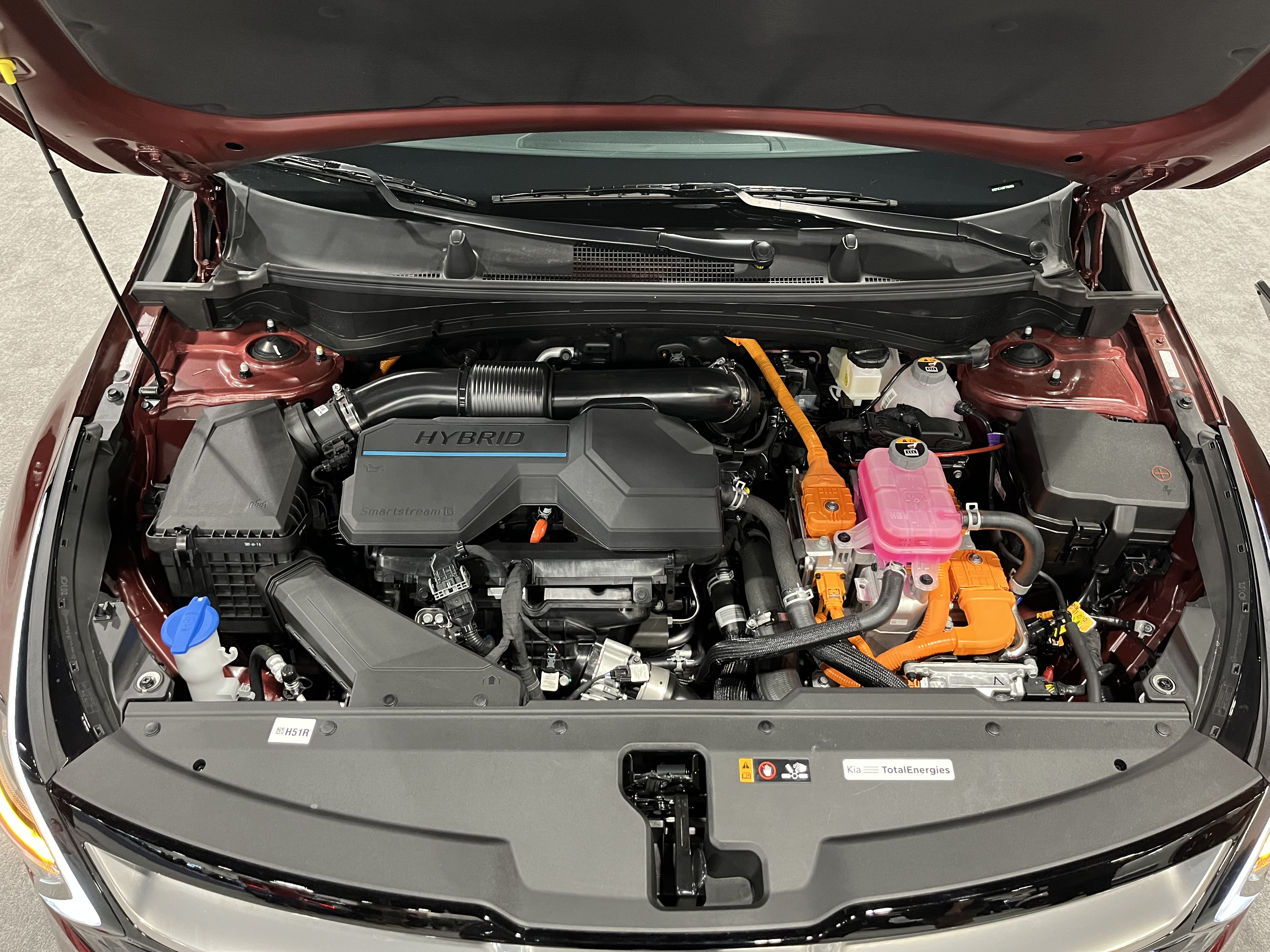
Smartstream G1.6T Hybrid engine in a 2023 Kia Sportage (US Market)

The Smartstream G1.6 T-GDi Hybrid combines a Smartstream G1.6 T-GDi with an electric motor that makes 60 PS (59 hp; 44 kW) between 1,600 rpm and 2,000 rpm with 26.9 kg⋅m (264 N⋅m; 195 lbf⋅ft) of torque between 0 and 1,600 rpm plus a 1.49KWh battery pack. Total combined system power is 230 PS (227 hp; 169 kW) at 5,500 rpm with 35.7 kg⋅m (258 lb⋅ft; 350 N⋅m) of torque between 1,500 and 4,400 rpm.

The engine which is installed in the Staria Hybrid features a more powerful electric motor which is rated 74 PS (73 hp; 54 kW) with 31 kg⋅m (304 N⋅m; 224 lbf⋅ft) of torque. Total combined system power is 245 PS (242 hp; 180 kW) at 5,500 rpm with 37.4 kg⋅m (271 lb⋅ft; 367 N⋅m) of torque.

The Smartstream G1.6 T-GDI Plug-in Hybrid combines a Smartstream G1.6 T-GDI with an electric motor that makes 91 PS (90 hp; 67 kW) between 2,100 and 3,300 rpm with 31 kg⋅m (304 N⋅m; 224 lbf⋅ft) of torque between 0 and 2,100 rpm plus a 13.8KWh battery pack. Total combined system power is 265 PS (261 hp; 195 kW) with 35.7 kg⋅m (258 lb⋅ft; 350 N⋅m) of torque.

Applications

- Hyundai Grandeur/Azera Hybrid (GN7) (2022–present)
- Hyundai Santa Fe Hybrid (TM) (2020–2023)
- Hyundai Santa Fe Hybrid (MX5) (2023–present)
- Hyundai Staria Hybrid (2024–present)
- Hyundai Tucson Hybrid (NX4) (2020–present)
- Kia K8 Hybrid (2021–present)
- Kia Sorento Hybrid (MQ4) (2020–present)
- Kia Sportage Hybrid (NQ5) (2021–present)

=== Smartstream G2.0 Hybrid (G4NR) ===
The Smartstream G2.0 GDi HEV is an inline 4-cylinder engine with GDi and 14.0:1 compression ratio; the gasoline engine makes 152 PS (150 hp; 112 kW) at 6,000 rpm and 19.2 kg⋅m (139 lb⋅ft; 188 N⋅m) of torque at 5,000 rpm.

The electric motor in the hybrid engine makes 51 PS (50 hp; 38 kW) between 1,770 and 2,000 rpm and 20.9 kg⋅m (151 lb⋅ft; 205 N⋅m) of torque between 0 and 1,770 rpm for a total system output of 195 PS (192 hp; 143 kW) at 6,000 rpm and 37.5 kg⋅m (271 lb⋅ft; 368 N⋅m).

In the plug-in hybrid version the electric motor makes 68 PS (67 hp; 50 kW) between 1,770 and 2,000 rpm and 20.9 kg⋅m (151 lb⋅ft; 205 N⋅m) of torque between 0 and 1,770 rpm for a total system output of 205 PS (202 hp; 151 kW) at 6,000 rpm.

Applications

- Hyundai Sonata Hybrid (DN8) (2019–present)
- Hyundai Tucson Hybrid (NX4) (2020–present)
- Kia K5 Hybrid (DL3) (2020–present)

=== Smartstream G2.5T Hybrid (G4KS) ===
The Smartstream G2.5 T-GDi Hybrid combines a Smartstream G2.5 T-GDi engine that makes 262 PS (258 hp; 193 kW) at 5,800 rpm with 36 kg⋅m (353 N⋅m; 260 lbf⋅ft) of torque between 1,800 and 4,500 rpm with an electric motor that makes 74 PS (73 hp; 54 kW) with 26.9 kg⋅m (264 N⋅m; 195 lbf⋅ft) of torque plus a 1.65KWh battery pack. Total combined system power is 334 PS (329 hp; 246 kW) at 5,800 rpm with 46.9 kg⋅m (460 N⋅m; 339 lbf⋅ft) of torque.

Applications

- Hyundai Palisade (LX3) (2025–present)

== LPG engines ==
=== Smartstream L2.0 (L4NB) ===
The Smartstream L2.0 is similar to the G2.0 MPi but comes with LPi injection instead, the engine makes 146 PS (144 hp; 107 kW) at 6,000 rpm and 19.5 kg⋅m (141 lb⋅ft; 191 N⋅m) of torque at 4,200 rpm.

Applications

- Hyundai Sonata (DN8) (2019–present)
- Kia K5 (DL3) (2019–present)
- Kia Sportage (NQ5) (2022–present)

=== Smartstream L2.5 T-LPDi (L4KC) ===
The Smartstream L2.5 T-LPDi is turbocharged 2,469 cc (2.5 L) with LPi injection. The engine makes 159 PS (157 hp; 117 kW) at 3,800 rpm and 30 kg⋅m (217 lb⋅ft; 294 N⋅m) of torque between 1,250 and 3,800 rpm, a lower power version for manual transmissions makes 138 PS (136 hp; 101 kW) at 3,800 rpm and 26 kg⋅m (188 lb⋅ft; 255 N⋅m) of torque between 1,250 and 3,800 rpm.

Applications

- Hyundai Porter (HR) (2024–present)
- Kia Bongo (PU) (2024–present)

=== Smartstream L3.5 (L6DC) ===
The Smartstream L3.5 is the LPG variant of the G3.5 engine, the engine makes 240 PS (237 hp; 177 kW) at 6,000 rpm and 32 kg⋅m (231 lb⋅ft; 314 N⋅m) of torque at 4,500 rpm.

Applications

- Hyundai Grandeur (GN7) (2022–present)
- Hyundai Staria (US4) (2021–present)
- Kia K8 (GL3) (2021–present)

== Diesel engines ==
=== Smartstream D1.5 ===
The Smartstream D1.5 VGT version makes 115 PS (113 hp; 85 kW) at 4,000 rpm and 25.5 kg⋅m (184 lb⋅ft; 250 N⋅m) of torque between 1,500 and 2,750 rpm, while the WGT version makes 100 PS (99 hp; 74 kW) at 4,000 rpm and 24.5 kg⋅m (177 lb⋅ft; 240 N⋅m) of torque between 1,500 and 2,750 rpm. It belongs to the Hyundai U engine family.

Applications

- Hyundai Alcazar (SU2 LWB) (2021–present)
- Hyundai Creta (SU2) (2020–present)
- Hyundai i20 (BI3) (2020–present)
- Hyundai Venue (QXi) (2020–present)
- Hyundai Verna (HCi) (2020–present)
- Kia Carens (KY) (2022–present)
- Kia Seltos (SP2i) (2019–present)
- Kia Sonet (QY) (2020–present)
- Kia Syros (AY) (2025)

=== Smartstream D1.6 (D4FE) ===
The Smartstream D1.6 features a new integrated thermal management system and is lighter than its predecessor thanks to an engine block constructed from aluminum. The engine uses a long life timing belt to drive the camshafts and makes 136 PS (134 hp; 100 kW) at 4,000 rpm and 32.6 kg⋅m (236 lb⋅ft; 320 N⋅m) of torque between 2,000 and 2,250 rpm. It is also available as a 115PS version.

Applications

- Hyundai i30 (PD) (2019–present)
- Hyundai i40 (2018–2019)
- Hyundai Kona (OS) (2020–2023)
- Hyundai Tucson (TL) (2018–2020)
- Hyundai Tucson (NX4) (2020–present)
- Kia Ceed (CD) (2019–present)
- Kia K3 (BD) (2018–present)
- Kia Sportage (QL) (2018–2021)
- Kia Sportage (NQ5) (2021–present)
- Kia Stonic (YB CUV) (2018–present)
- Kia Optima (JF) (2018-2019)

=== Smartstream D2.0 (D4HD) ===
The Smartstream D2.0 makes 186 PS (183 hp; 137 kW) at 4,000 rpm and 42.5 kg⋅m (307 lb⋅ft; 417 N⋅m) of torque between 2,000 and 2,750 rpm.

Applications

- Hyundai Tucson (NX4) (2020–present)
- Kia Sportage (NQ5) (2021–present)

=== Smartstream D2.2 (D4HE/D4HH) ===
The Smartstream D2.2 features an aluminium block versus the older R II 2.2L engine and therefore it is 38 kg lighter, the engine compression ratio is 16.0:1 and the fuel pressure was increased to 2,200 bar. The engine switched back to a timing belt instead of a timing chain.

The D4HE and D4HH engines produce 202 PS (199 hp; 149 kW) at 3,800 rpm and 45 kg⋅m (325 lb⋅ft; 441 N⋅m) of torque between 1,750 and 2,750 rpm.

Applications

- Hyundai Santa Fe (TM) (2020–2024)
- Kia Carnival (KA4) (2020–present)
- Kia Sorento (MQ4) (2020–present)

=== Smartstream FR D2.2 (D4HF) ===
The D4HF is for RWD based applications and the engine produce 210 PS (207 hp; 154 kW) at 3,800 rpm and 45 kg⋅m (325 lb⋅ft; 441 N⋅m) of torque between 1,750 and 2,750 rpm.

Applications

- Genesis G80 (RG3) (2020–2021)
- Genesis GV70 (JK1) (2020–present)
- Kia Tasman (TK) (2025-present)

=== Smartstream D3.0 (D6JA) ===
The Smartstream D3.0 is a turbocharged inline 6-cylinder diesel engine with a bore of 83 mm (3.3 in) and 92.3 mm (3.63 in) stroke respectively; the engine makes 277 PS (273 hp; 204 kW) at 3,750 rpm and 60 kg⋅m (434 lb⋅ft; 588 N⋅m) of torque between 1,500 and 3,250 rpm, since 2022 the power rating was revised to 272 PS (268 hp; 200 kW) at 3,800 rpm.

This engine is 32 kg lighter than its predecessor and friction is reduced by water-cooled technology Intercooler. EGR and SCR system is applied to reduce the fuel consumption and fuel pressure was increased from 1,800 bar to 2,200 bar.

Applications

- Genesis GV80 (JX1) (2020–2023)

== See also ==
- List of Hyundai engines
