= Kia K8 =

Full-size sedan produced by Kia

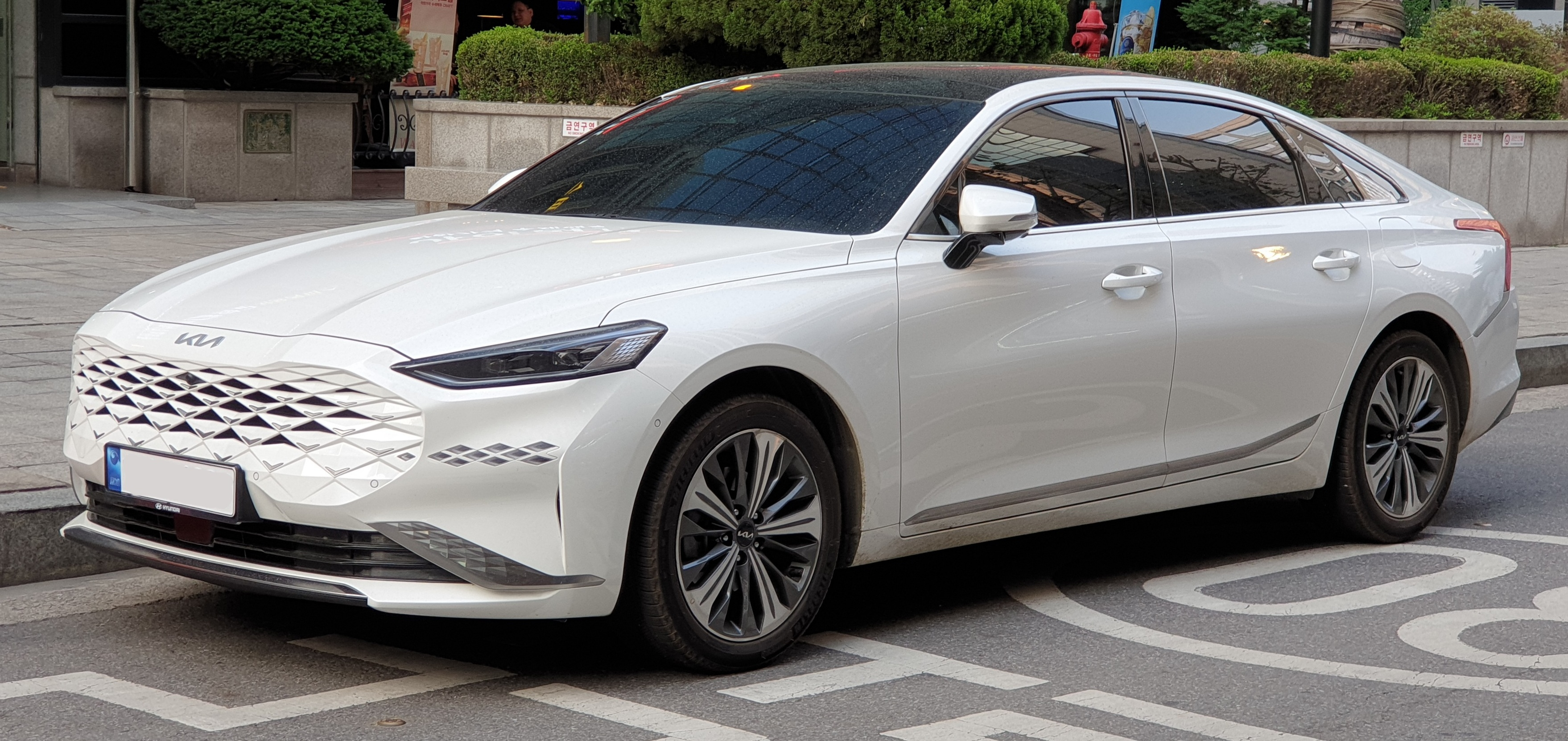
- 2022 K8 Hybrid (pre-facelift)

Overview
- Manufacturer: Kia
- Model code: GL3
- Production: April 2021 – present
- Model years: 2022–present
- Assembly: South Korea: Hwaseong (Hwaseong Plant); Uzbekistan: Jizzakh (ADM-Jizzakh)
- Designer: Karim Habib

Body and chassis
- Class: Full-size car (E)
- Body style: 4-door sedan
- Layout: Front-engine, front-wheel-drive; Front-engine, all-wheel-drive
- Platform: Hyundai-Kia N3 platform
- Related: Hyundai Grandeur/Azera (GN7)

Powertrain
- Engine: Petrol: 2.5 L Smartstream G2.5 GDI I4; 3.5 L Smartstream G3.5 GDI V6; Petrol hybrid: 1.6 L Smartstream G1.6 T-GDI I4; Petrol LPG: 3.5 L Smartstream L3.5 LPi V6
- Electric motor: Permanent magnet synchronous
- Transmission: 6-speed automatic 8-speed automatic
- Hybrid drivetrain: Power-split hybrid (HEV)

Dimensions
- Wheelbase: 2,895 mm (114.0 in)
- Length: 5,015 mm (197.4 in) (Pre-facelift); 5,050 mm (198.8 in) (Facelift)
- Width: 1,875 mm (73.8 in) (Pre-facelift); 1,880 mm (74.0 in) (Facelift)
- Height: 1,455 mm (57.3 in) (Pre-facelift); 1,455–1,480 mm (57.3–58.3 in) (Facelift)
- Curb weight: 1,540–1,765 kg (3,395–3,891 lb)

Chronology
- Predecessor: Kia K7/Cadenza

The Kia K8 is an executive car / full-size car manufactured by Kia since 2021.

Internally designated ‘GL3’, it was the successor to the K7/Cadenza.

== Overview ==
It was unveiled in February 2021 and launched in South Korea in April 2021, replacing the Kia K7, which was sold in some markets as the Kia Cadenza. The K8 introduced Kia's "Opposites United" design language to the K-series range and is built on Hyundai-Kia's N3 front-wheel-drive platform. It is closely related to the seventh-generation Hyundai Grandeur (GN7), sharing the same underlying platform and several major mechanical components.

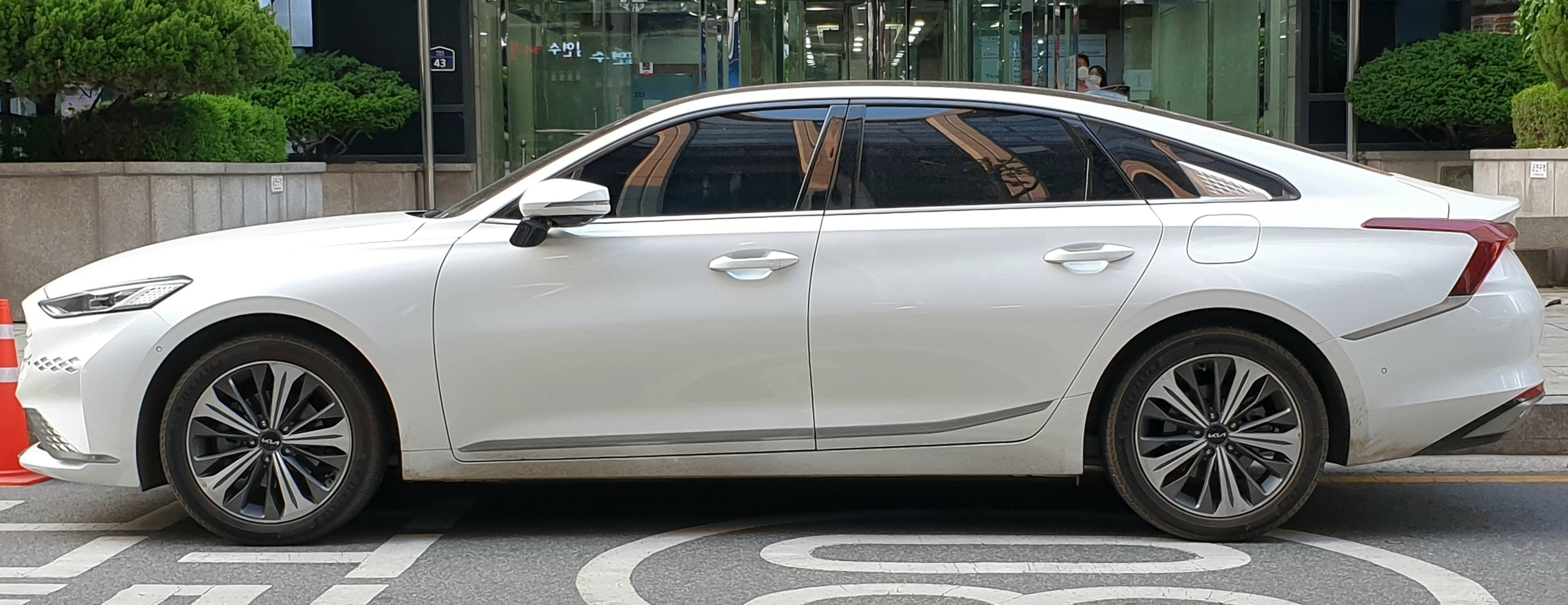
Side view (pre-facelift)

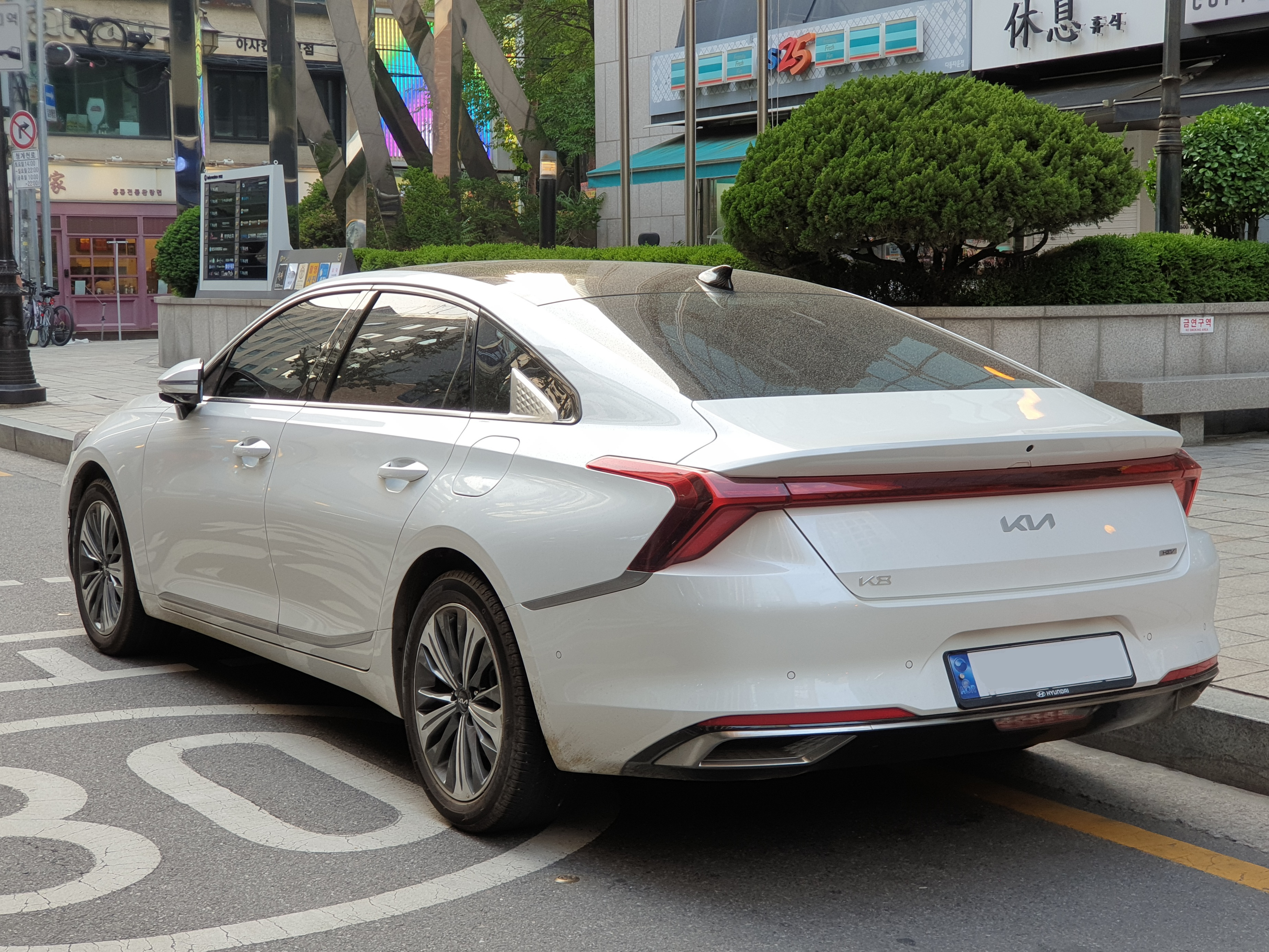
Rear view (pre-facelift)

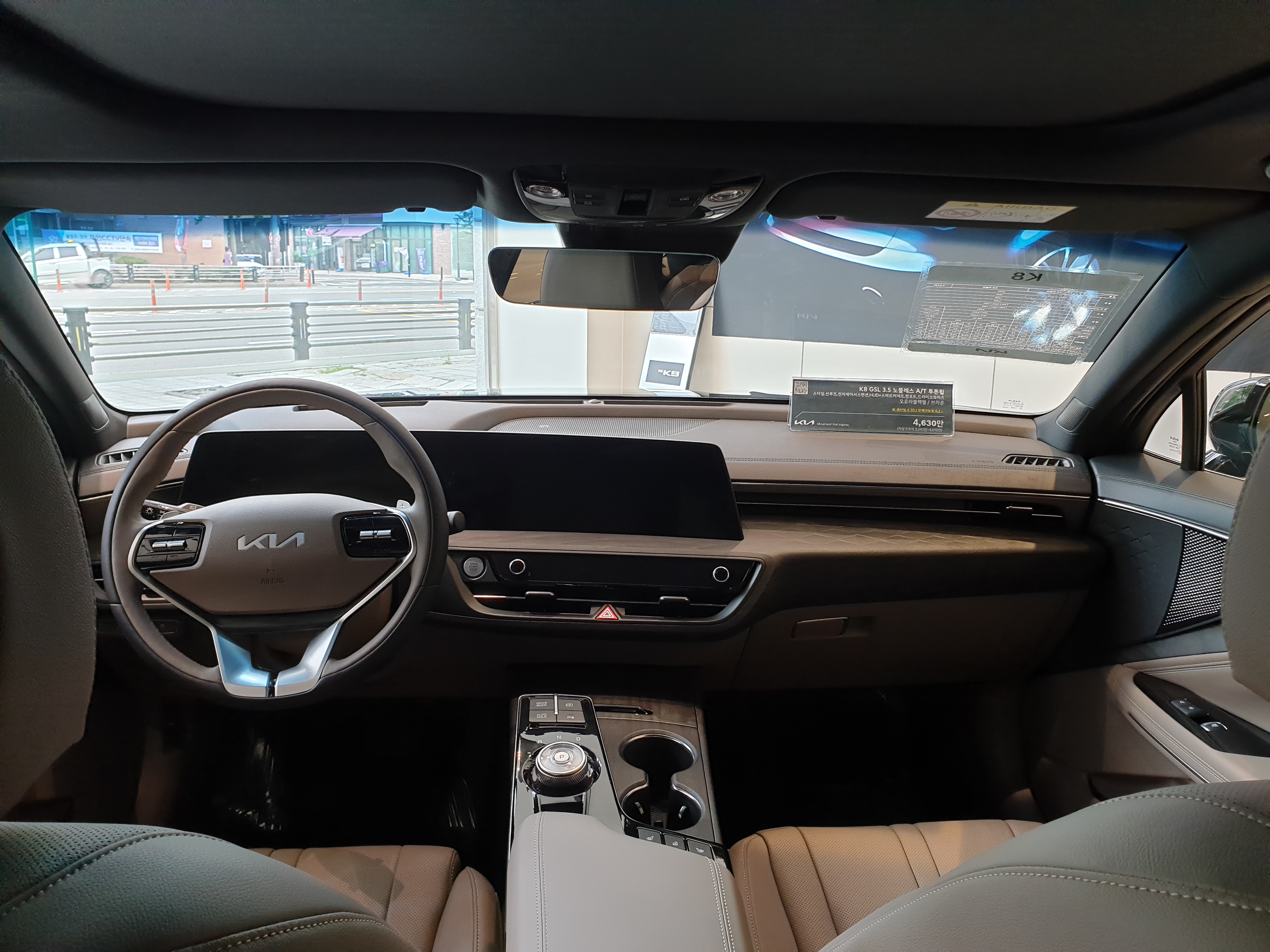
Interior (pre-facelift)

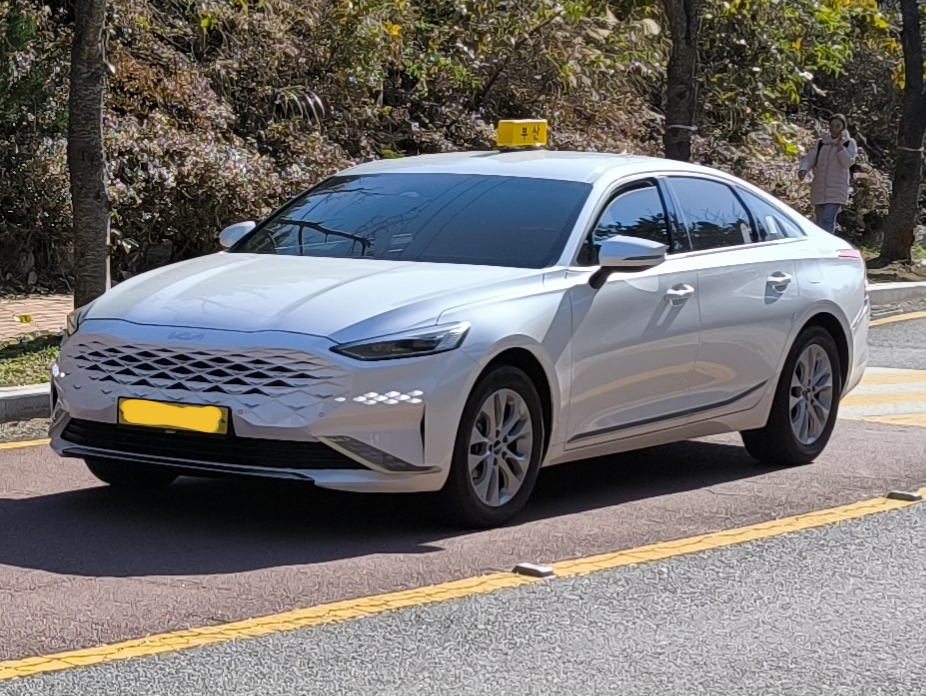
K8 Taxi (Korea) (pre-facelift)

=== Exterior ===
The K8 has a fastback-inspired silhouette with a long roofline, a low bonnet, and a wide, muscular stance. Its front end is defined by a large frameless grille, slim LED headlamps, and a prominent lower intake, while the rear features a full-width light bar and a clean, minimalist tailgate design. The body sides use sculpted surfaces and horizontal character lines intended to create a sense of continuous motion, even when the car is stationary. Kia also offered distinctive wheel designs and exterior details such as flush door handles and a chrome window surround to reinforce the sedan's premium appearance.

=== Interior ===
The interior is designed as a driver-focused, lounge-like cabin with a curved panoramic display that combines the digital instrument cluster and infotainment screen. A 12-inch head-up display projects key driving information onto the windscreen, while the centre console places frequently used controls within easy reach of the driver. Depending on market and trim level, the K8 offers Nappa leather upholstery, ventilated and heated front and rear seats, an Ergo Motion driver's seat, a 14-speaker Meridian premium audio system, and multi-zone climate control. Ambient lighting, soft-touch surfaces, and a simplified dashboard layout contribute to the car's premium and technology-oriented atmosphere.

== 2024 facelift ==
The Kia K8 received its first major facelift in August 2024, introducing a redesigned front fascia with vertical projection LED headlamps, Kia's "Star Map" signature lighting, and a full-width LED light bar that visually connects the front lamps.

The facelift also revised the rear bumper and added black exterior trim, while the interior received a new steering wheel, additional colour schemes, dynamic ambient lighting, and a heated, UV-C-sterilising dual-armrest console. It adopted Kia's next-generation ccNC infotainment system with over-the-air software updates, alongside a 12.3-inch panoramic curved display and enhanced driver-assistance systems.

The updated K8 retained the 2.5-litre petrol, 3.5-litre V6 petrol, and 3.5-litre LPG engines, while adding a 1.6-litre turbocharged hybrid powertrain that combines a 47.7 kW electric motor with a six-speed automatic transmission. The facelift was launched in the Middle East and Africa in March 2025, where it was offered with the 3.5-litre Smartstream V6 petrol engine and the 1.6-litre turbo hybrid.

2025 K8 Hybrid (facelift)

K8 Hybrid Side view

K8 Hybrid Rear view

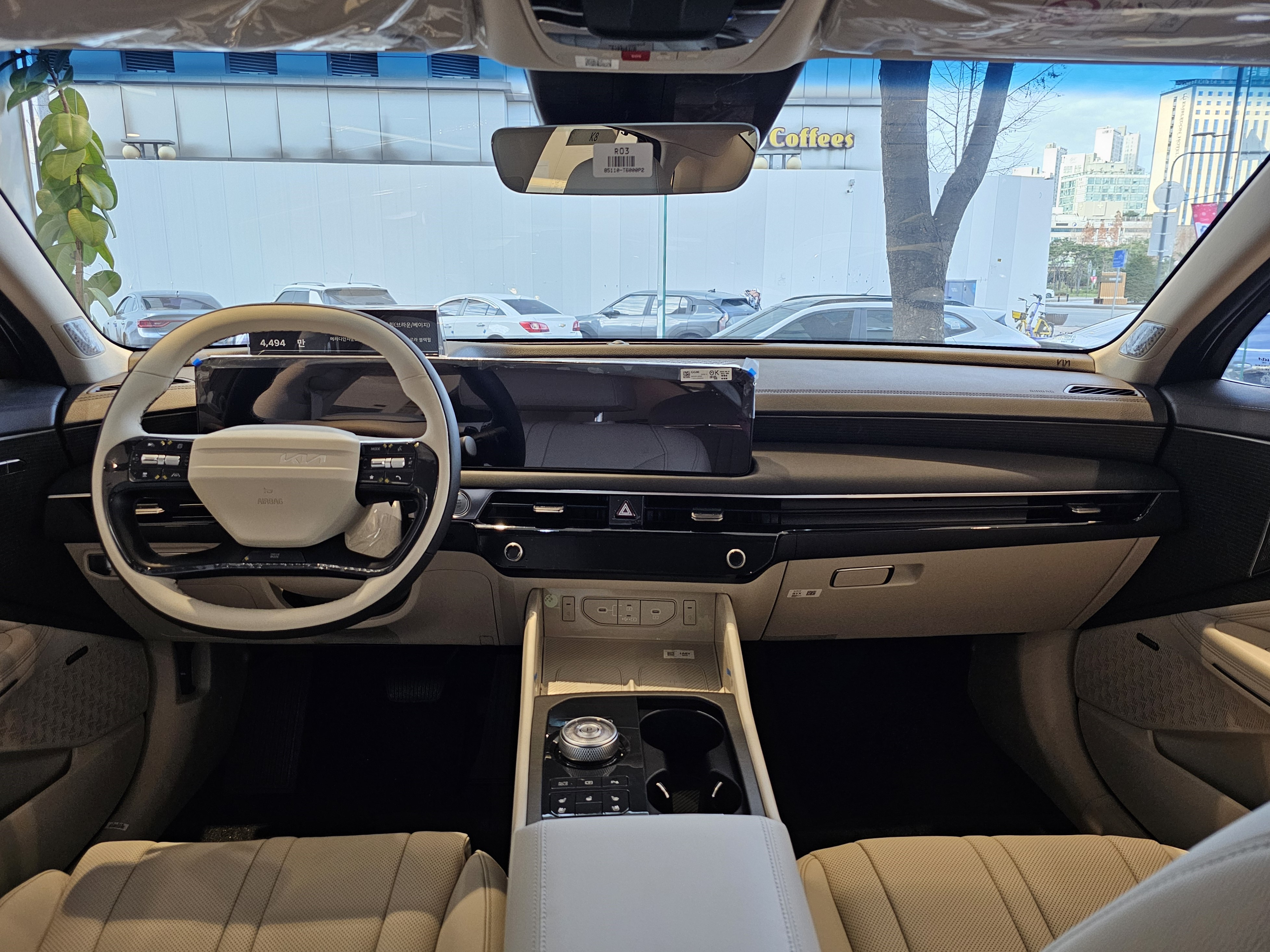
Interior

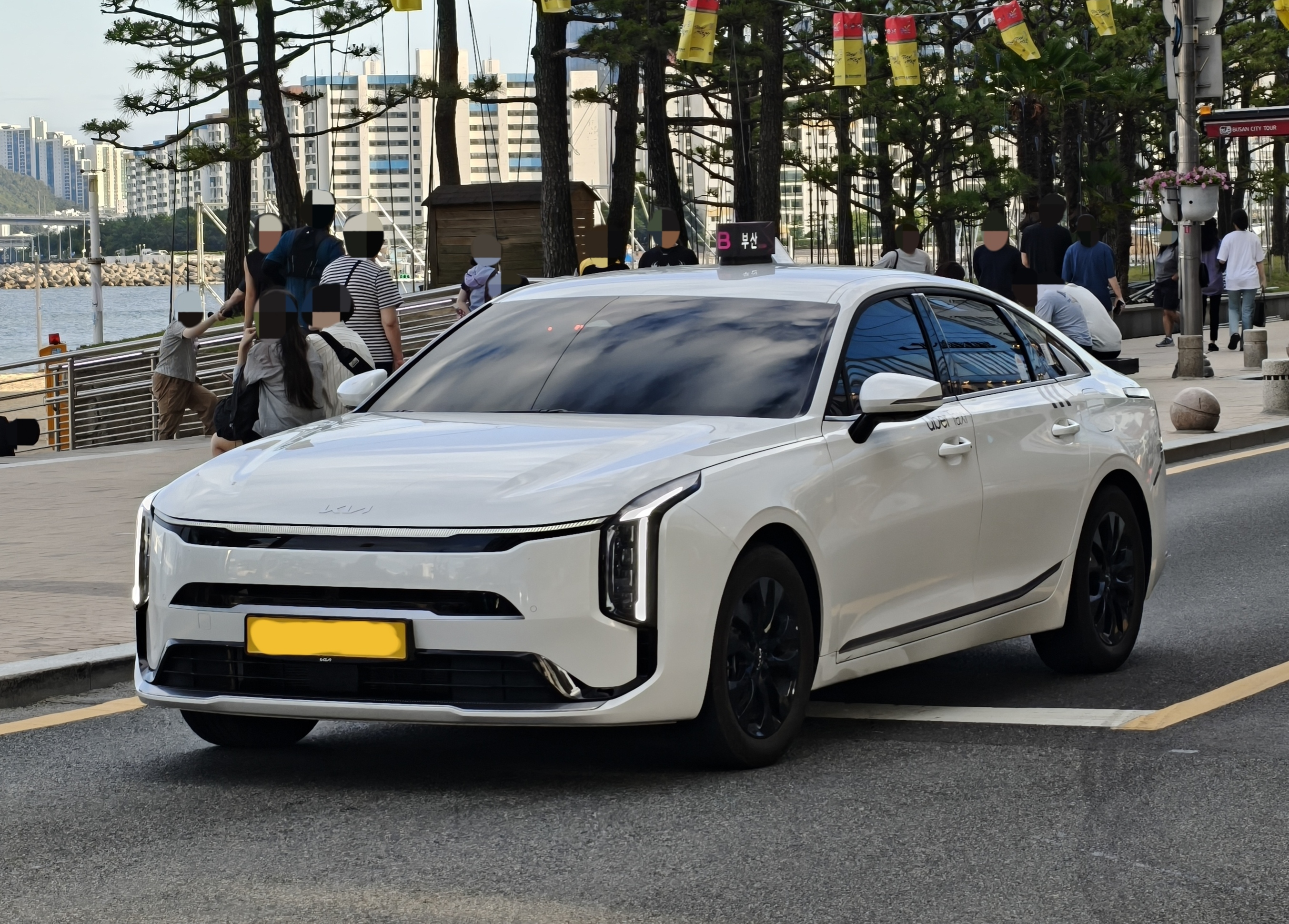
Kia K8 Taxi (Facelift) in Korea

== K8 Hybrid ==
Kia K8 Hybrid was released on 4 May 2021, offering a 1.6-litre turbo hybrid engine in addition to the conventional engine, 17-inch machined-face wheels, an emblem that indicates the vehicle is electrified, and a dedicated cluster graphic.

== Powertrain ==
The K8 will be offered with a 3.5-litre V6 engine producing 300 PS (296 hp; 221 kW), or the base 2.5-litre inline four making 198 PS (195 hp; 146 kW). An optional 3.5-litre LPI (Liquid Propane Injection) engine will be offered that makes 240 PS (237 hp; 177 kW). It is paired with an 8-speed automatic transmission, which is claimed to improve the V6 engines’ fuel economy by up to 6 percent.

Specifications
Model	Displacement	Transmission	Power	Torque	0–100 km/h (0-62 mph) (Official)
Petrol
Smartstream G2.5 GDI	2,497cc	8-speed automatic	198 PS (146 kW; 195 hp) @ 6,100 rpm	25.3 kg⋅m (248 N⋅m; 183 lbf⋅ft) @ 4,000 rpm	
Smartstream G3.5 GDI	3,470cc	8-speed automatic	300 PS (221 kW; 296 hp) @ 6,400 rpm	36.6 kg⋅m (359 N⋅m; 265 lbf⋅ft) @ 5,000 rpm	6.9s
Hybrid
Smartstream G1.6 T-GDI Hybrid	1,598cc	6-speed automatic	230 PS (169 kW; 227 hp) @ 5,500 rpm	35.7 kg⋅m (350 N⋅m; 258 lbf⋅ft) @ 1,500–4,400 rpm	
LPG
Smartstream L3.5 LPi	3,470cc	8-speed automatic	240 PS (177 kW; 237 hp) @ 6,000 rpm	32 kg⋅m (314 N⋅m; 231 lbf⋅ft) @ 4,500 rpm	

== Sales ==
Year	South Korea
2021	n/a
2022	45,650
2023	40,437
2024	32,734
