= Kia Tasman =

Mid-sized pick-up truck

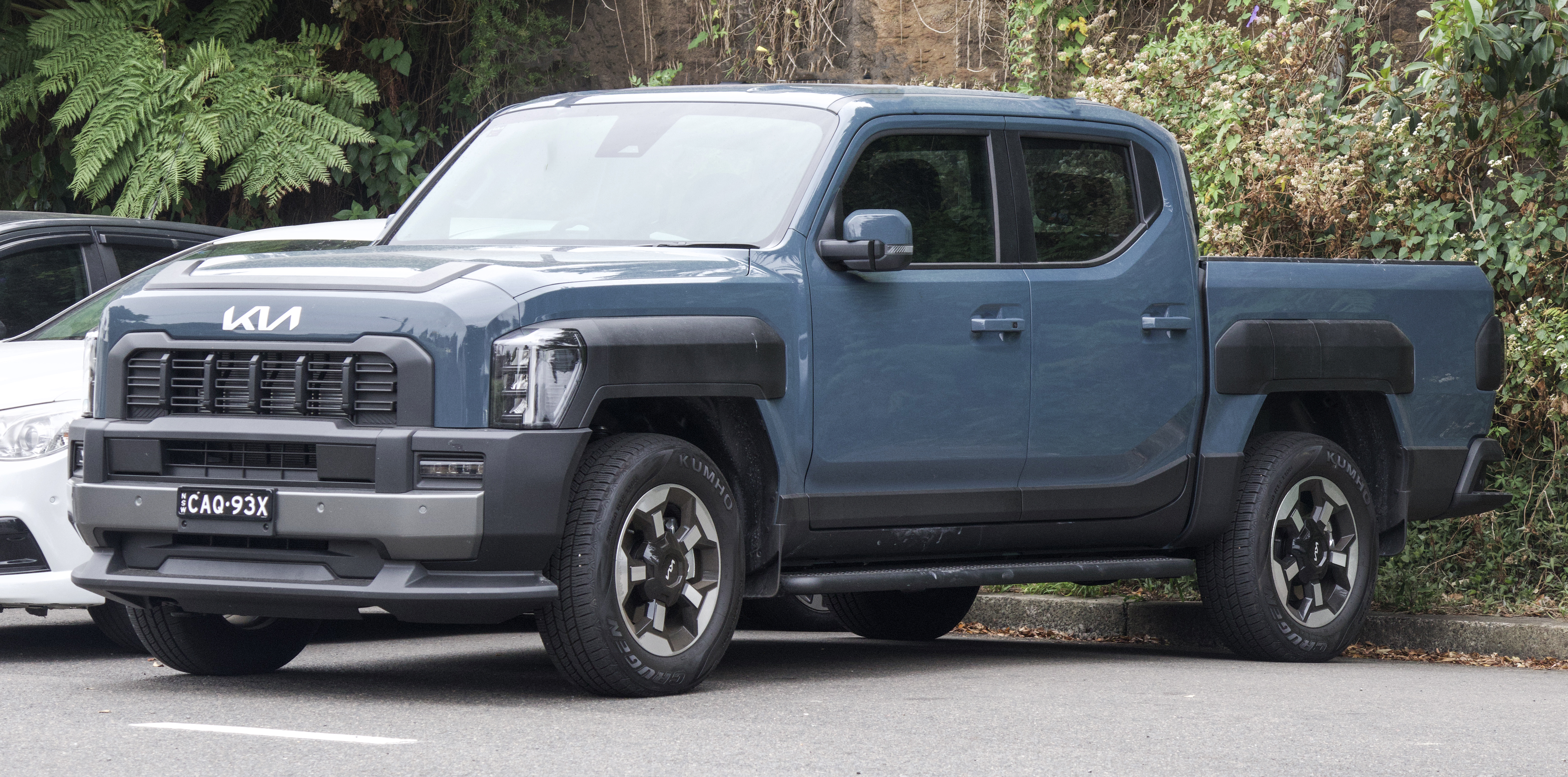

Overview
- Manufacturer: Kia
- Model code: TK
- Production: February 2025 – present
- Assembly: South Korea: Hwaseong (Autoland Hwasung)

Body and chassis
- Class: Mid-size pickup truck
- Body style: 2-door cab chassis; 2-door regular cab; 4-door cab chassis; 4-door crew cab
- Layout: Front-engine, rear-wheel-drive; Front-engine, four-wheel-drive
- Chassis: Body-on-frame

Powertrain
- Engine: Petrol: 2.5 L Smartstream G2.5 T-GDi I4; Diesel: 2.2 L Smartstream D2.2 CRDi Turbo I4
- Transmission: 6-speed M6VR2 manual; 8-speed A8TR1-1 automatic

Dimensions
- Wheelbase: 3,270 mm (128.7 in)
- Length: 5,410 mm (213.0 in)
- Width: 1,930 mm (76.0 in)
- Height: 1,870–1,920 mm (73.6–75.6 in)

The Kia Tasman (Korean: 기아 타스만) is a mid-size pickup truck manufactured and marketed by Kia since 2025. It is built on a body-on-frame chassis, and powered by turbocharged four-cylinder petrol and diesel engines.

It was unveiled simultaneously in two locations on 29 October 2024 at the Jeddah International Motor Show in Saudi Arabia, and in Hobart, Tasmania, Australia.

== Etymology ==
The vehicle is named after the Tasman Sea, located between Australia and New Zealand. According to Kia, the name was chosen due to the importance of the Australian and New Zealand markets for the vehicle.

== Overview ==
The Tasman is produced in South Korea, with Australia targeted to be one of the main markets for the vehicle. Kia claimed the Tasman is "the most Australian vehicle" it has ever developed. Kia Australia claimed a major involvement in the development of the pickup truck, and targeted around 10 percent of pickup truck market share in the country once the Tasman went on sale.

The Tasman is built on an all-new platform, and slated to compete with the Ford Ranger, Isuzu D-Max, Mitsubishi Triton, Nissan Navara and Toyota Hilux, and matches their braked towing capacity of 3,500 kg (7,700 lb) and a payload of around 1,000 kg (2,200 lb).

The name 'Tasman' was confirmed in April 2024, before the first official appearance of the Tasman on 23 April 2024, when Kia Australia released images showing the vehicle wrapped in artistic camouflage sticker designed by local artist Richard Boyd-Dunlop.

The Tasman, which required four years of development and more than 18,000 quality tests. Every Kia design studio worldwide contributed twenty initial Tasman design studies to the project. They were later reduced to three final full-size proposals shown to Kia regions and the winner was subsequently chosen.

The Tasman is offered with four bed accessory configurations: Single Decker, Double Decker, Sports Bar and Ladder Rack. There are chassis cab and single cab models.

The Tasman Weekender concept was unveiled on 8 April 2025.

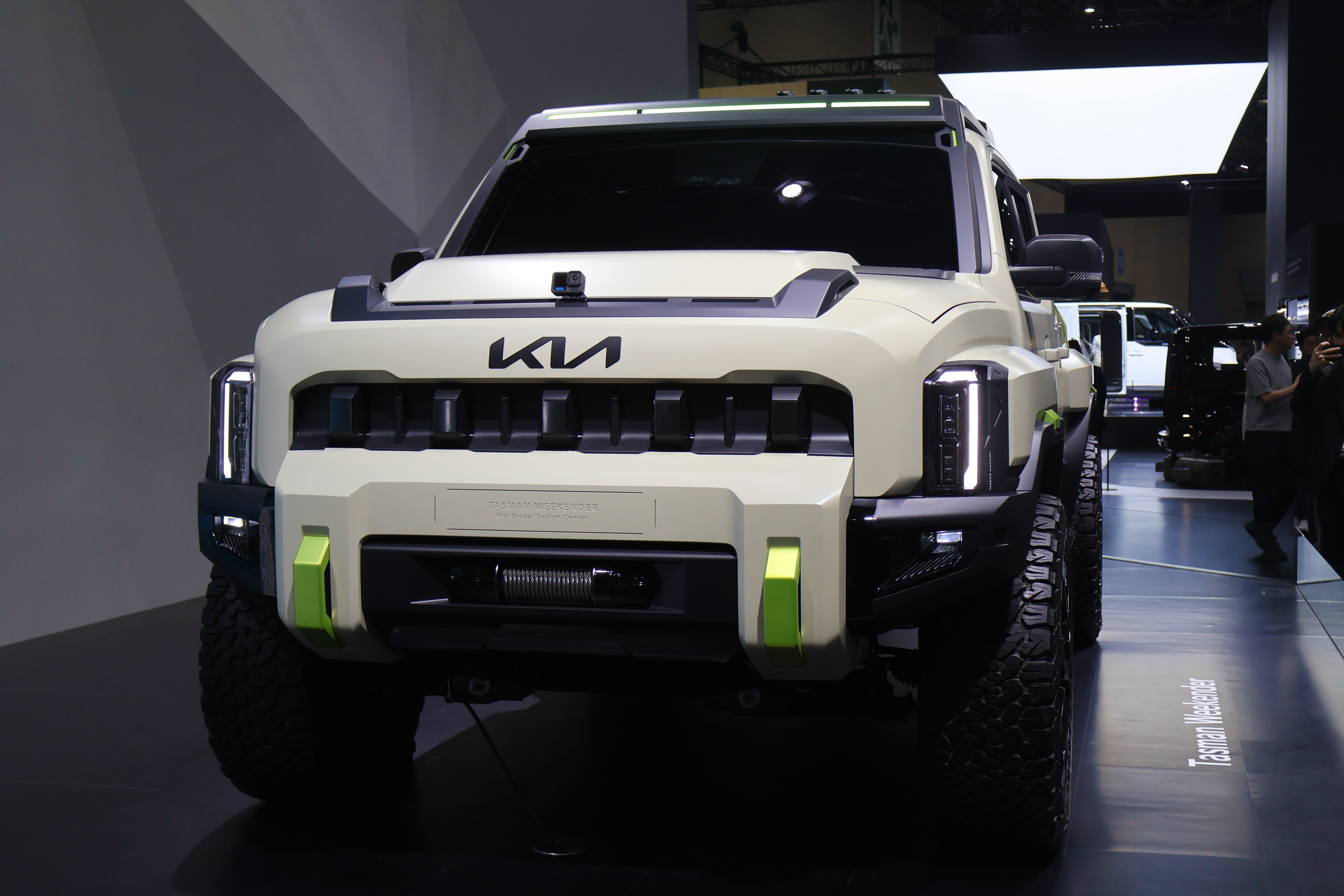
Kia Tasman Weekender concept (front)

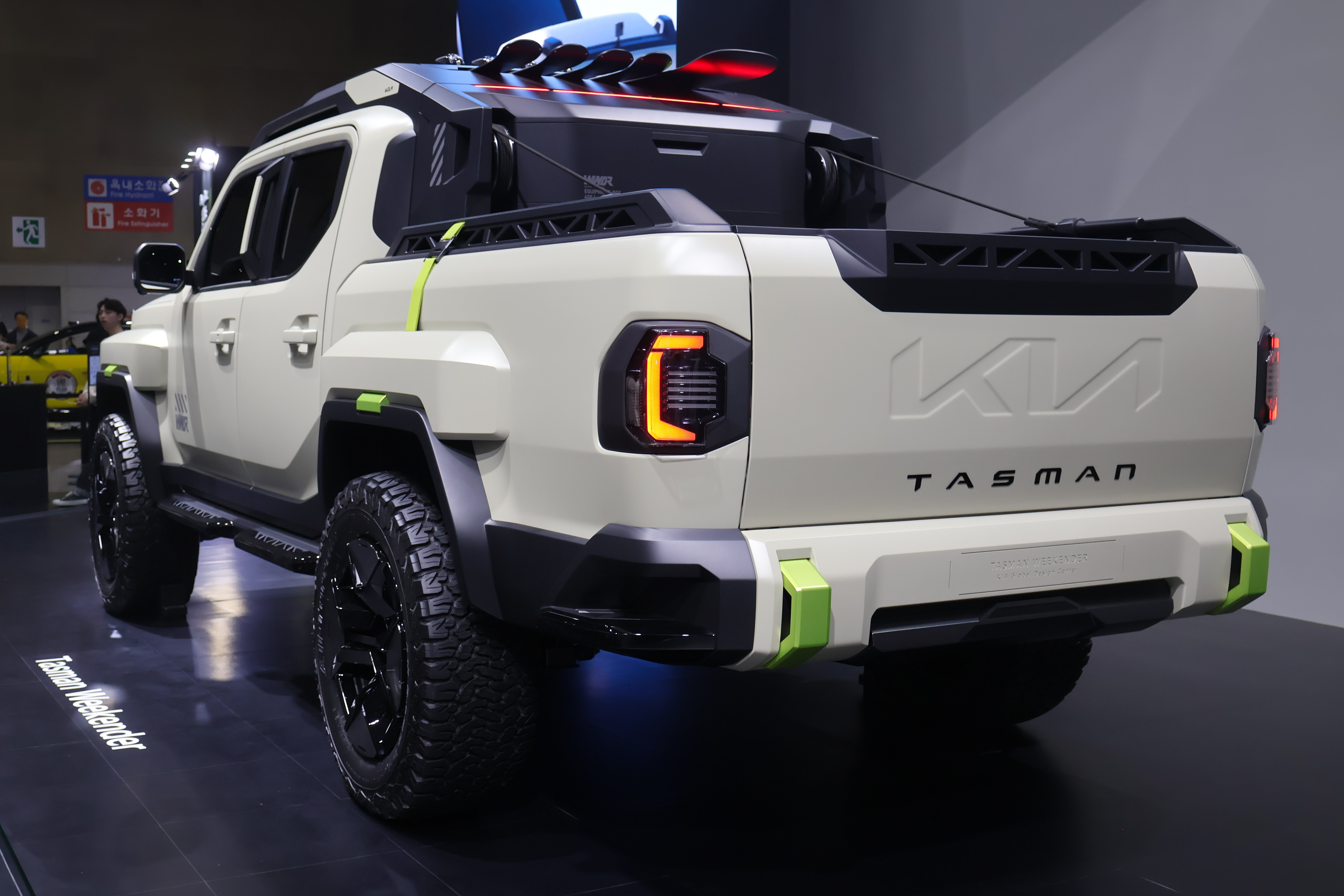
Kia Tasman Weekender concept (rear)

=== Exterior ===
The Tasman features the Kia's Opposites United design philosophy with the Kia Tiger Face. There are vertically positioned lighting signature in the headlights, front windshield and rear window positioned at 45°, and the stamped Kia logo on the tailgate. The wheel arches incorporate additional elements within them such as additional storage, fuel port access and the front headlights.

We are proud of what we have achieved. The design department within Kia has created something unique and there are a lot of positive responses from it [...] We knew we had to do something creative and different. And this is the beginning of a journey for Kia as well of course.

— John Buckingham, Kia chief of vehicle exterior design

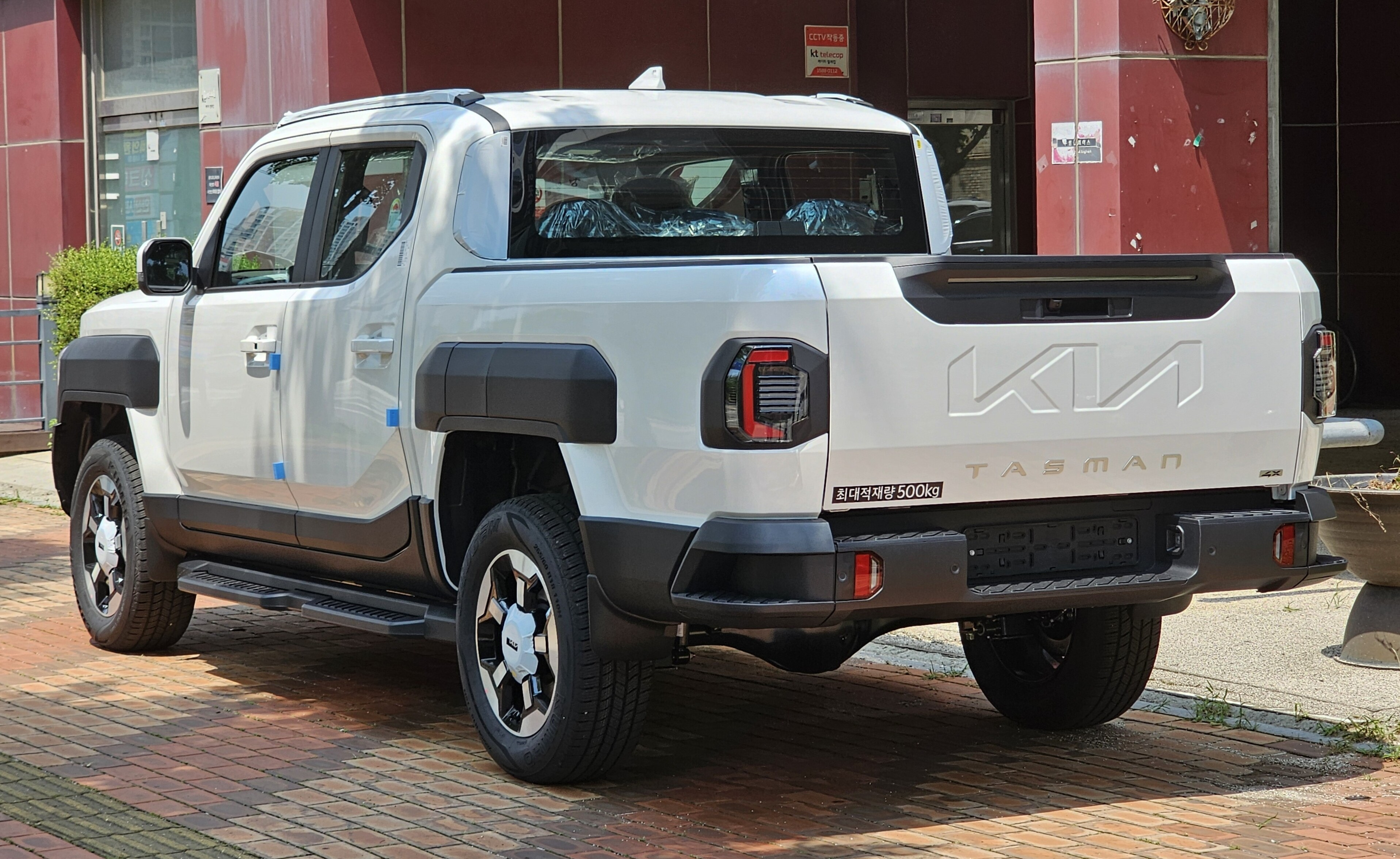
Rear view

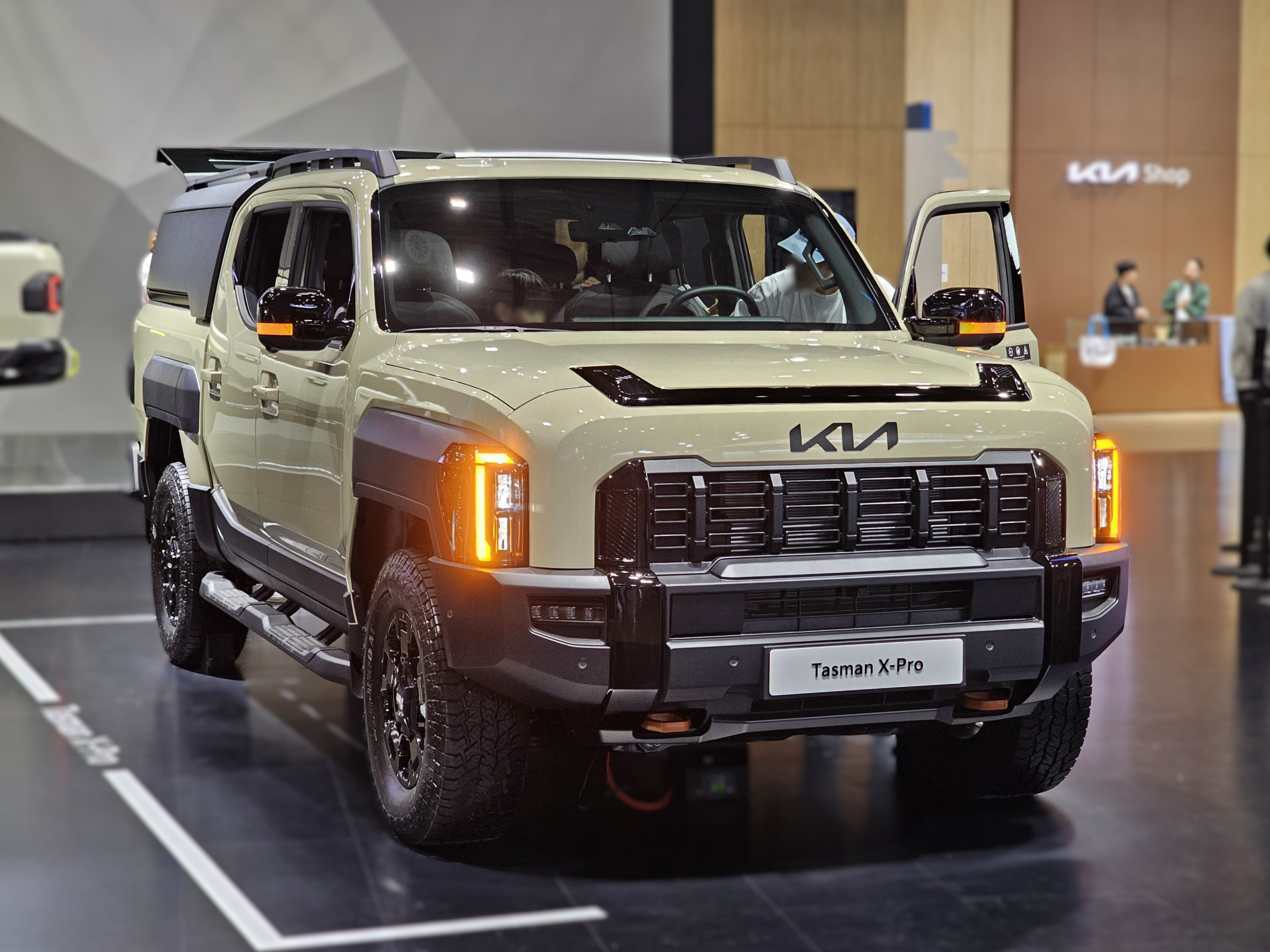
Kia Tasman X-Pro (front)

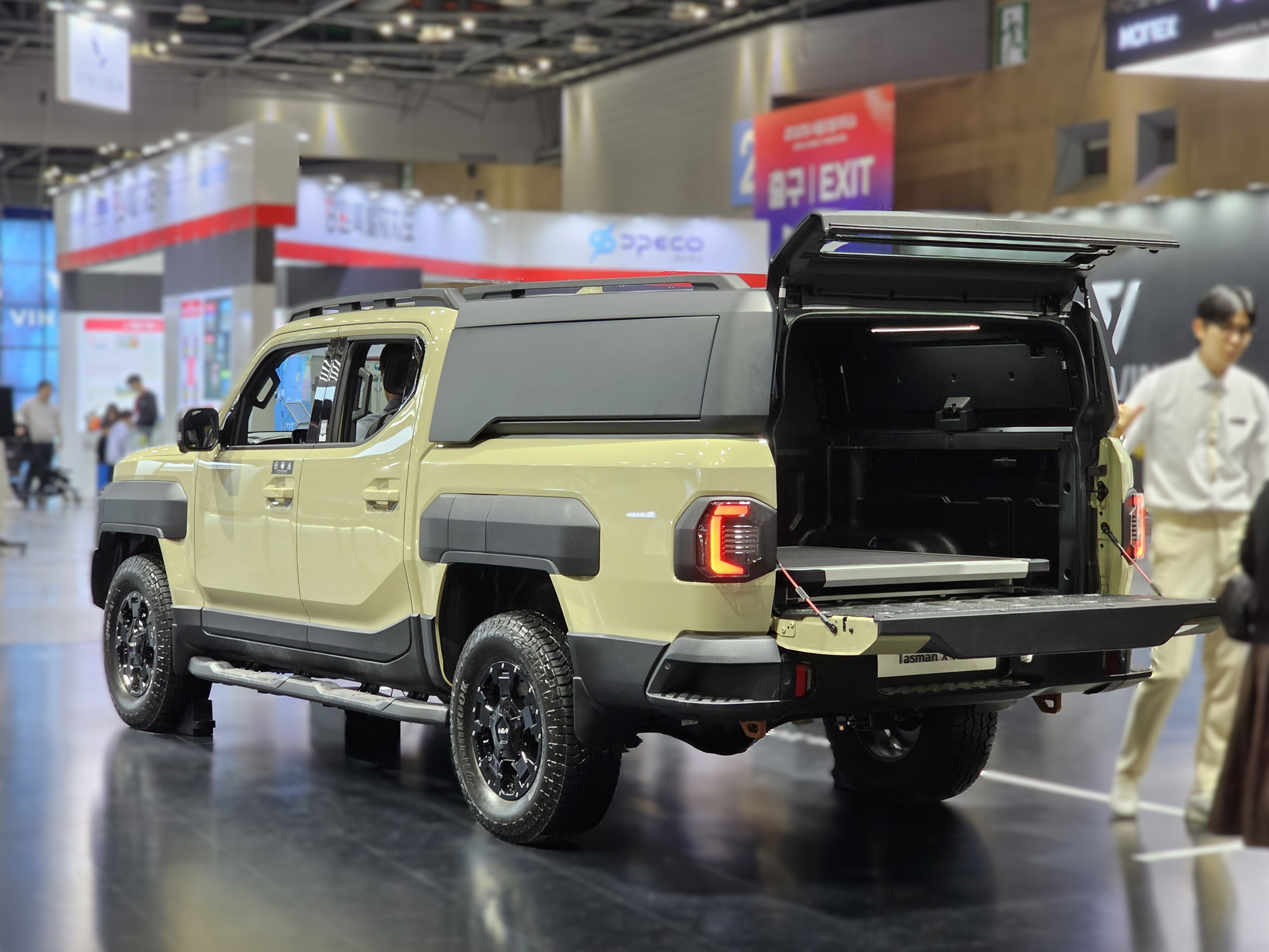
Kia Tasman X-Pro (rear)

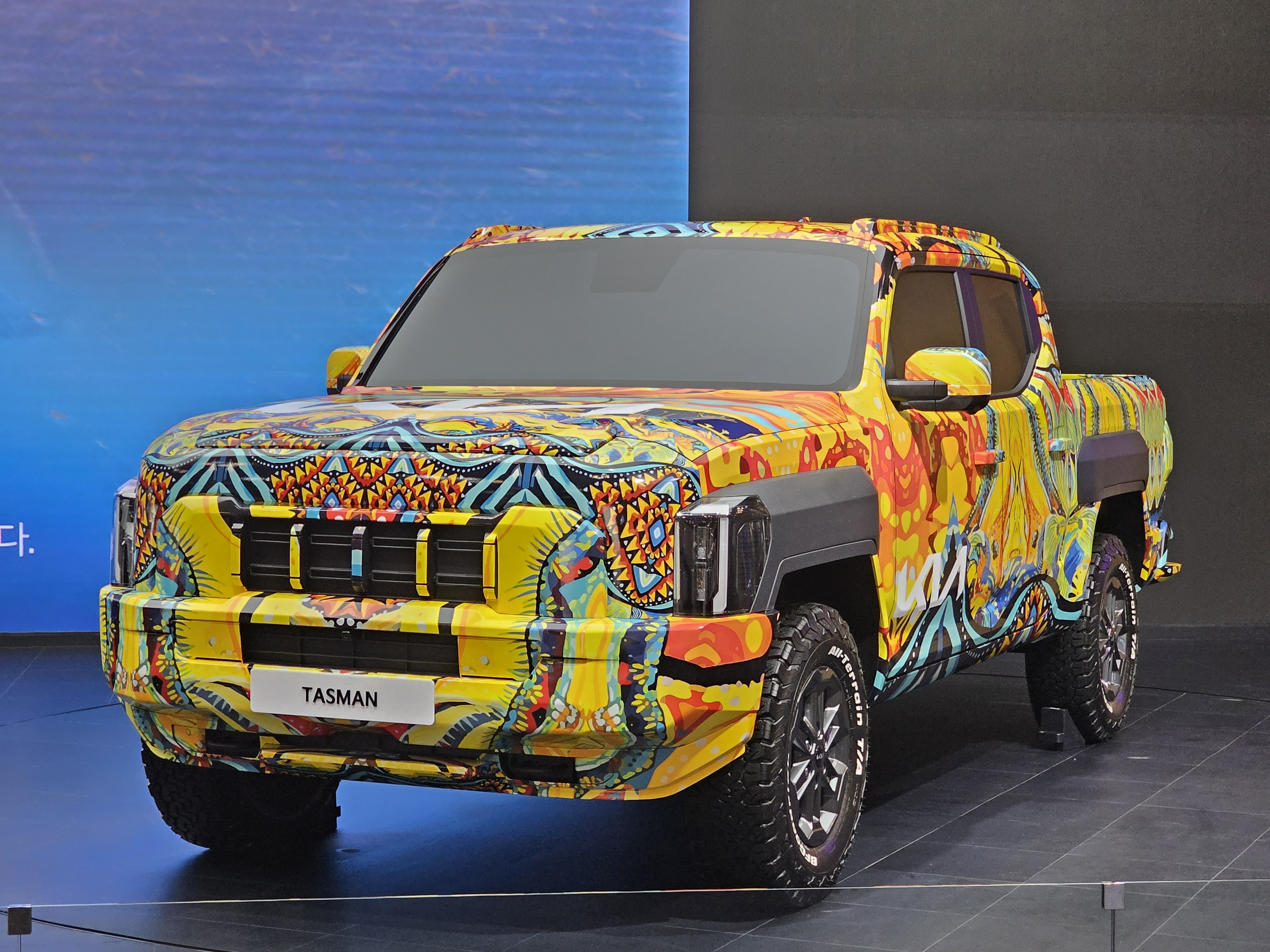
Kia Tasman Camouflage (front)

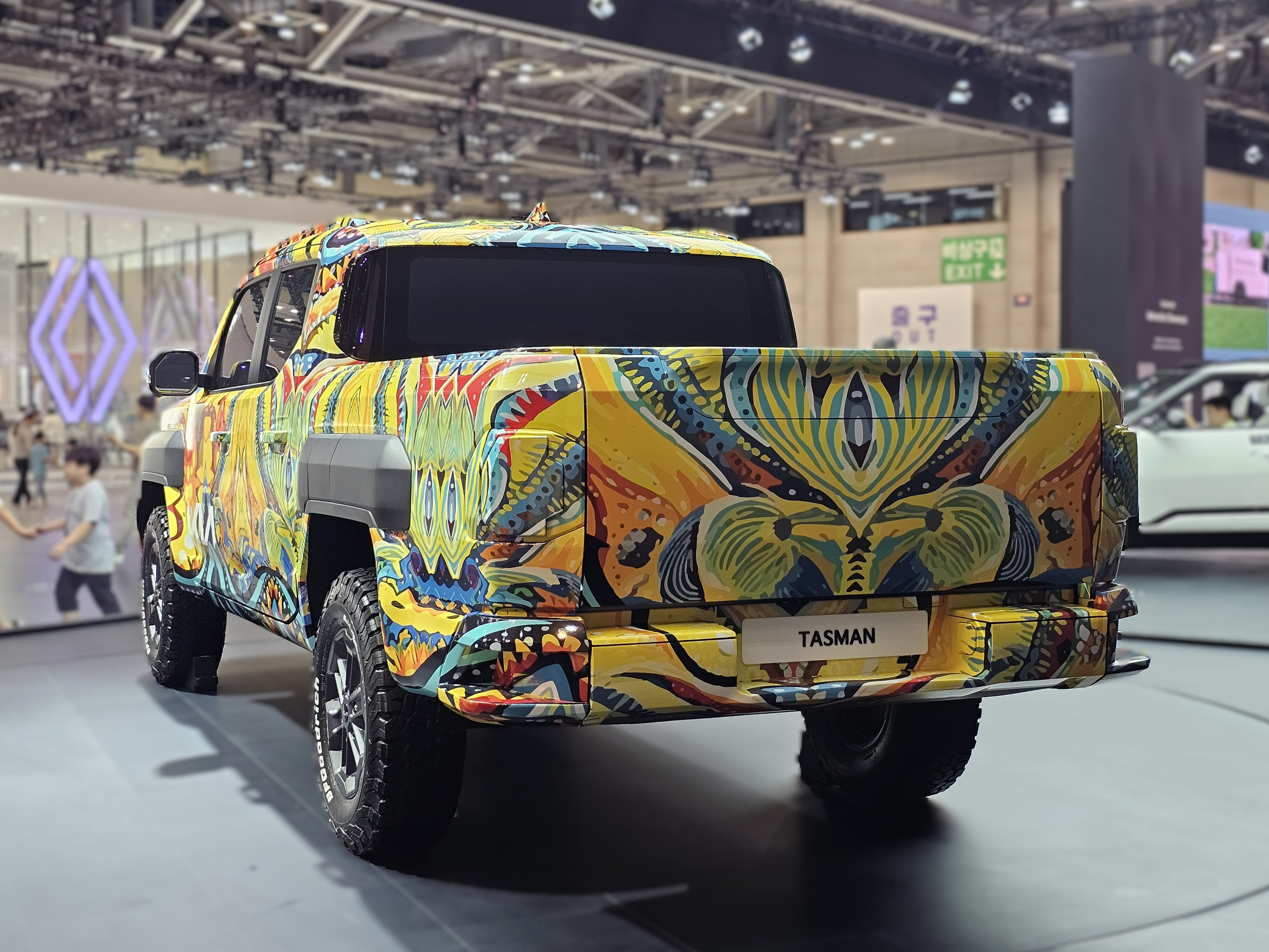
Kia Tasman Camouflage (rear)

=== Interior ===
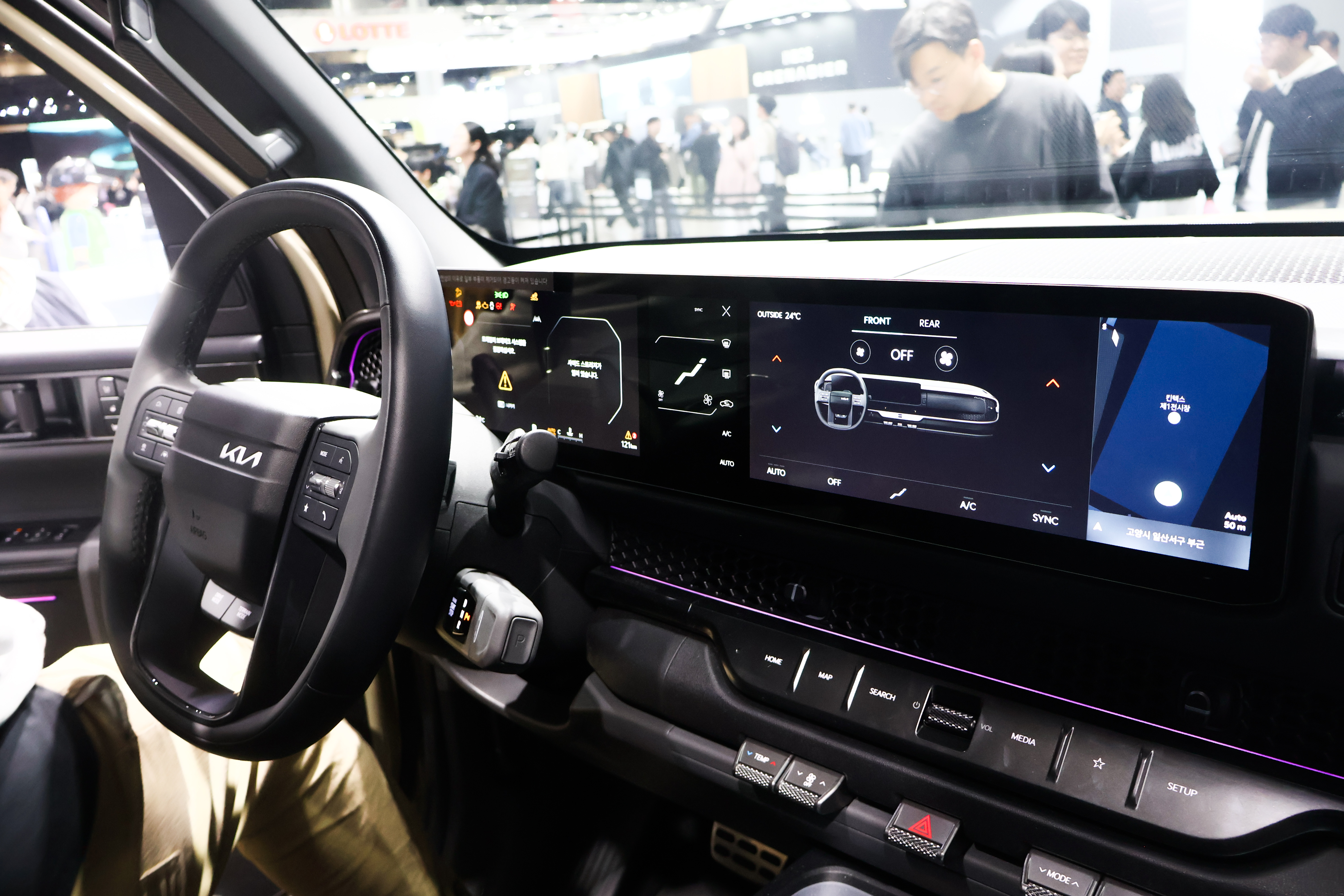
Interior

The interior of the Tasman was designed based on the theme of “use-case”.

Inside, the Tasman features a triple screen layout with a 12.3-inch digital instrument cluster, 5-inch display for the HVAC controls and a 12.3-inch touchscreen infotainment system. Like all Kia products, the Tasman includes the brand’s ten must have sustainable items used for the crash pad, seats and interior carpet. Other interior features include dual wireless charging pads, a folding centre console, a Harman Kardon sound system, and a 33-litre hidden storage area under the rear seat bases.

For passenger space, the Tasman has 940mm of headroom, shoulder room and legroom for rear seat space. The rear seats are able to recline up to 30°.

The load bed in the Tasman measures at 1,512 mm (59.5 in), 1,572 mm (61.9 in), and 540 mm (21 in), in length, width, and height, respectively. This has a cargo capacity at 1,173 L (41.4 cubic feet), a maximum load bed payload of 1,145 kg (2,524 lb) in 2WD mode, and a towing capacity of 3,500 kg (7,700 lb).

=== Powertrain ===
Engines
Model	Year	Transmission	Power	Torque	0–100 km/h (0–62 mph) (official)	Top speed
Petrol
Smartstream G2.5 T-GDi	2025–present	8-speed automatic	207 kW (278 hp)	421 N⋅m (311 lb⋅ft)	8.5s	185 km/h (115 mph)
Diesel
Smartstream D2.2 CRDi	2025–present	6-speed manual 8-speed automatic	154 kW (207 hp)	440 N⋅m (325 lb⋅ft)	10.4s	185 km/h (115 mph)

=== Safety ===
For the suspension, the front uses a double wishbone setup and the rear uses a rigid axle setup with leaf springs combined with vertical shock absorbers. Both setup features Kia’s frequency selective Sensitive Damper Control (SDC) and Hydraulic Rebound Stop technology.

The AWD system automatically switches to provide enough traction on different road surfaces and has three standard driving modes - ECO, Smart and Sport. In addition to the standard driving modes, there are various terrain modes available depending on the relevant market. Other drivetrain features are Electronic Locking Differential (e-LD), an X-Trek mode that allows for low-speed off-road driving, and Kia's Ground View Monitor (GVM) camera system. The Tasman is available with Advanced Driver Assistance System (ADAS) and Highway Driving Assist 2 (HDA 2) safety systems, both systems have been adapted with trailer profile functionality.

ANCAP test results Kia Tasman (2025, aligned with Euro NCAP)
Test	Points	%
Overall:	5 /5 stars	
Adult occupant:	34.14	85%
Child occupant:	41.86	85%
Pedestrian:	46.82	74%
Safety assist:	14.42	80%

== Markets ==
The initial rollout target markets included South Korea, Australia and New Zealand, Africa, and the Middle East. The Tasman is not currently available in the United States, Canada, or Mexico, but Kia have announced that it will enter the North American market by 2030.

=== Africa ===
==== South Africa ====
The Tasman was launched in South Africa on 8 April 2026 and it is available with three variants: LX (4x2), SX (4x4) and X-Pro (4x4), all variants were powered by a 2.2-litre CRDi turbocharged diesel engine.

=== Middle East ===
The Tasman went on sale in the Middle East in August 2025, offered in trims including LX, EX, EX Top, X-Line, X-Pro, and X-Pro+ in 2WD or 4WD configurations. Powertrains comprise a 2.5-litre turbocharged petrol engine producing 281 PS (277 hp) and 422 N⋅m (311 lb⋅ft), paired with an eight-speed automatic transmission, and a 2.2-litre turbo-diesel producing 210 PS (207 hp) and 440 N⋅m (325 lb⋅ft), available with a six-speed manual or eight-speed automatic transmission.

=== Latin America ===
==== Argentina ====
The Tasman was launched in Argentina on 24 July 2026, with three variants: EX, EX TD and X Pro. For engines, the EX and X Pro variants use the 2.5-litre T-GDi turbocharged petrol, while the EX TD use the 2.2-litre CRDi turbocharged diesel.

==== Brazil ====
The Tasman was launched in Brazil on 18 August 2026, in the sole GL variant powered by the 2.2-litre CRDi turbocharged diesel.

=== Oceania ===
==== Australia ====
The Tasman went on sale in Australia on 17 April 2025, with customer deliveries later commenced in July 2025. At launch, the Tasman was available as a dual-cab pick-up model and it is available in five variants: S, SX, SX+, X-Line and X-Pro. All variants powered by the 2.2-litre CRDi turbocharged diesel engine and all variants comes standard with 4x4 (four-wheel drive), except for the base S variant which comes standard with 4x2 (rear-wheel drive).

In August 2025, the single-cab and dual-cab chassis models were added to the line-up for the S and SX variants. All single-cab and dual-cab chassis model variants are standard with 4x4 (four-wheel drive), except for the single-cab chassis S variant.

==== New Zealand ====
The Tasman went on sale in New Zealand on 17 April 2025 and it is available with five variants: TX 4WD, TXR 4WD, TXS 4WD, X-Line 4WD and X-Pro 4WD. All variants powered by the 2.2-litre CRDi turbocharged diesel engine and comes standard with four-wheel drive.

=== Asia ===
==== Brunei ====
The Tasman was launched in Brunei on 28 August 2025 and it is available with three variants: LX, EX and X-Line, all variants were powered by a 2.2-litre CRDi turbocharged diesel engine.

==== Cambodia ====
The Kia Tasman was launched in Cambodia on 5 September 2025. It is available with two variants: the X-Line and X-Pro, both variants are powered by a 2.2-litre CRDi turbocharged diesel engine.

== Sales ==
Year	Australia
2025	4,196
