= Hyundai Nu engine =

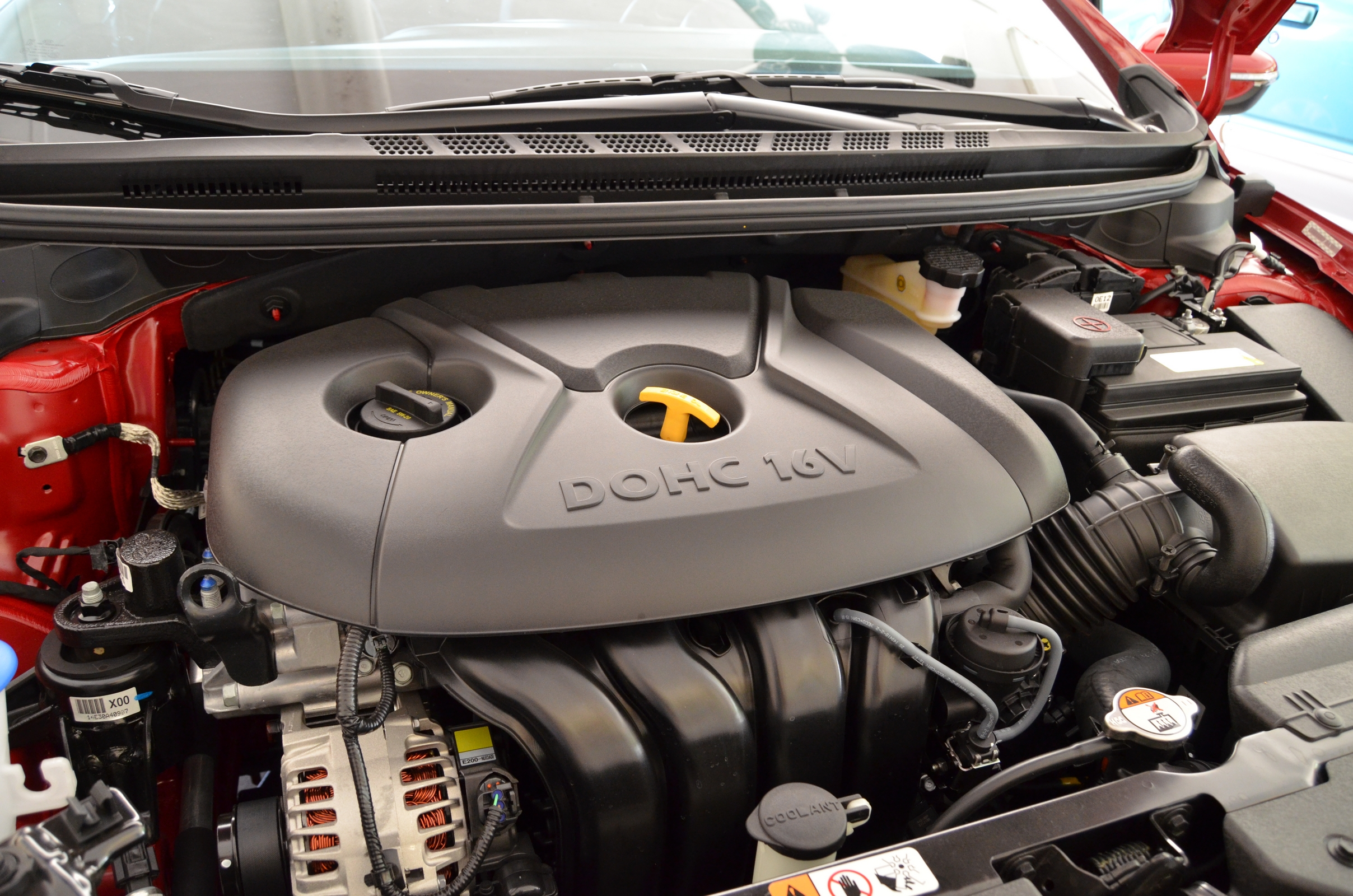

Overview
- Manufacturer: Hyundai Motor Company
- Production: 2010–present

Layout
- Configuration: Inline-four
- Displacement: 1.8 L; 109.7 cu in (1,797 cc); 2.0 L; 122.0 cu in (1,999 cc)
- Cylinder block material: Aluminium
- Cylinder head material: Aluminium
- Valvetrain: DOHC 16V D-CVVT
- Compression ratio: 10.3:1–12.7:1

RPM range
- Idle speed: 660 rpm
- Max. engine speed: 6,800 rpm

Combustion
- Fuel system: MPI; GDI
- Fuel type: Unleaded gasoline LPG
- Oil system: Pressure feed
- Cooling system: Water-cooled

Output
- Power output: 149–176 PS (110–129 kW; 147–174 hp)
- Torque output: 18.1–21.7 kg⋅m (131–157 lb⋅ft; 178–213 N⋅m)

Dimensions
- Length: 495 mm (19.5 in)
- Width: 614 mm (24.2 in) (MPi/GDi); 635 mm (25.0 in) (HEV/Atkinson)
- Height: 664 mm (26.1 in) (MPi/GDi/HEV); 673 mm (26.5 in) (Atkinson)
- Dry weight: 104.5 kg (230 lb) (1.8L); 114.7–119.7 kg (253–264 lb) (2.0L)

Chronology
- Predecessor: Beta
- Successor: Smartstream G2.0/L2.0 (for 2.0L Nu)

The Hyundai Nu engine was introduced in the 2011 Hyundai Elantra to replace the previous Beta engines. It was designed to fill the gap between the new Gamma 1.6L and the 2.0L Theta II.

== NU MPi ==
=== 1.8L (G4NB) ===
The 1.8 L (1,797 cc) Nu features a bore x stroke of 81 mm × 87.12 mm (3.19 in × 3.43 in) with a compression ratio of 10.3:1 or 10.5:1 depending on the revision. This engine features MPI, and Dual-Continuous Variable Valve Timing aka D-CVVT. Power output is 145–150 PS (107–110 kW; 143–148 hp) at 6,500 rpm with 17.8–18.1 kg⋅m (129–131 lb⋅ft; 175–178 N⋅m) of torque at 4,700 rpm.

Hyundai Nu engine Specification:

- Displacement: 1.8 L (1,797 cc)
- Bore x stroke of 81 mm × 87.12 mm (3.19 in × 3.43 in) (offset crank to cylinder bore)
- Compression ratio 10.3:1–10.5:1
- Power: 145–150 PS (107–110 kW; 143–148 hp) at 6,500 rpm
- Torque: 17.8–18.1 kg⋅m (129–131 lb⋅ft; 175–178 N⋅m) at 4,700 rpm
- Redline 6,800 rpm
- Combustion Fuel system: MPI
- Valvetrain: Chain driven roller DOHC 16V D-CVVT
- Cylinder block & head: Aluminum
- Intake: Valve controlled Variable Induction System

Applications

- Hyundai Elantra (MD) (2010–2015)
- Hyundai i30 (GD) (2011–2017)
- Hyundai Mistra (2014–2023)
- Kia Forte (YD) (2013–2016)
- Kia K4 (2014–2021)

=== 2.0L (G4NA) ===
The Nu 2.0 L (1,999 cc) version of this engine features the same 81 mm (3.19 in) bore but with a longer stroke of 97 mm (3.8 in). First revision of the G4NA engine makes 166 PS (122 kW; 164 hp) at 6,500 rpm and 20.5 kg⋅m (148 lb⋅ft; 201 N⋅m) at 4,800 rpm while later revisions produce 152–156 PS (112–115 kW; 150–154 hp) at 6,200 rpm and 19.6–19.9 kg⋅m (142–144 lb⋅ft; 192–195 N⋅m) at 4,500 rpm.

Applications

- Hyundai Creta (GS) (2014–2020)
- Hyundai Creta (SU2r) (2021–2022)
- Hyundai Elantra (UD) (2013–2015)
- Hyundai Elantra (AD) (2015–2020)
- Hyundai i40 (2011–2019)
- Hyundai Mistra (CF) (2013–2020)
- Hyundai Sonata (YF) (2014)
- Hyundai Tucson/ix35 (LM) (2013–2015)
- Hyundai Tucson (TL) (2015–2018)
- Kia Carens (RP) (2013–2019)
- Kia Forte (YD) (2012–2018)
- Kia K4 (2014–2021)
- Kia KX3 (KC) (2015–2019)
- Kia Soul (2012–2019)
- Kia Sportage (2014–2021)

=== 2.0L CVVL (G4ND) ===
Primary change is adding the CVVL, the engine produces 172 PS (127 kW; 170 hp) at 6,700 rpm and 20.5 kg⋅m (148 lb⋅ft; 201 N⋅m) at 4,800 rpm.

Applications

- Hyundai Sonata (LF) (2014–2019)
- Kia Optima (2012–2019)

=== 2.0L Atkinson Cycle (G4NH) ===
The Atkinson Cycle version of the Nu MPi 2.0L was first released for the sixth generation Hyundai Elantra, compression ratio is 12.5:1 and it produces 149 PS (110 kW; 147 hp) at 6,200 rpm with 18.3 kg⋅m (132 lb⋅ft; 179 N⋅m) of torque at 4,500 rpm.

The engine promises improved fuel economy vs the Nu MPi 2.0L (G4NA) engine and better thermal efficiency.

Applications

- Hyundai Elantra (AD) (2015–2020)
- Hyundai Kona (OS) (2017–2020)
- Hyundai Tucson (TL) (2015–2020)
- Hyundai Veloster (JS) (2018–2020)
- Kia Forte (BD) (2018–2023)
- Kia Seltos (2019–present)
- Kia Soul (SK3) (2019–present)

== Nu GDi ==
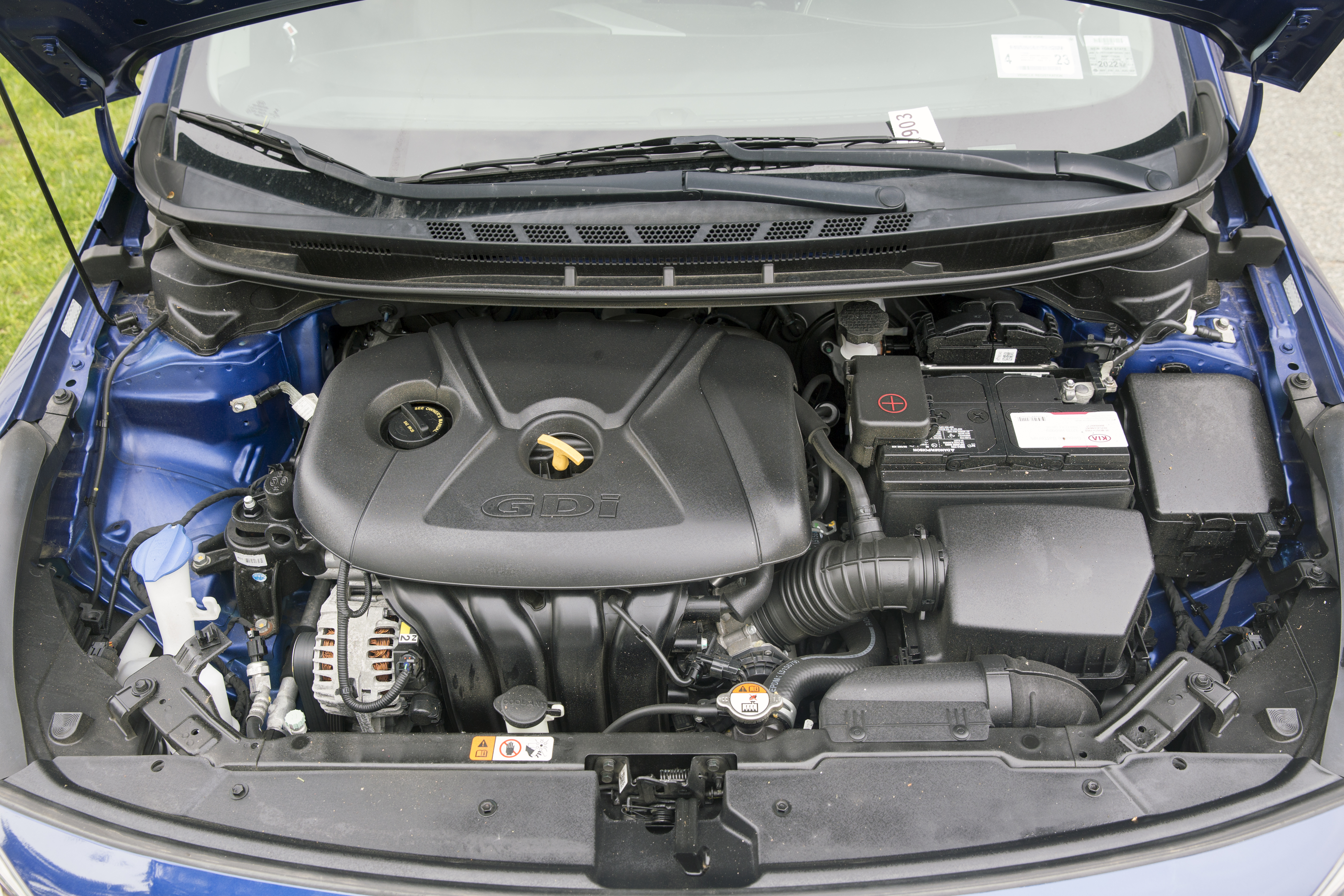
The G4NC Nu GDi engine in a Kia Forte

=== 2.0L (G4NC) ===
The Nu GDi 2.0 L (1,999 cc) version of this engine features the same 81 mm (3.19 in) bore but with a longer stroke of 97 mm (3.82 in) that produces 176 PS (129 kW; 174 hp) at 6,500 rpm with 21.7 kg⋅m (157 lb⋅ft; 213 N⋅m) of torque at 4,700 rpm.

Applications

- Hyundai Elantra (MD) (2013–2015)
- Hyundai Elantra Coupe (JK) (2014)
- Hyundai i30 (GD) (2014–2016)
- Hyundai i30 (PD) (2016–present)
- Hyundai i40 (2012–2019)
- Hyundai Tucson (LM) (2013–2015)
- Hyundai Tucson (TL) (2015–2020)
- Kia Carens (RP) (2013–2019)
- Kia KX5 (2015–2021)
- Kia KX7 (2016–2022)
- Kia Soul (2012–2019)
- Kia Sportage (QL) (2015–2021)
- Kia Sportage Ace (NP) (2021–present)

== Nu Flex ==
Flex fuel compatible engine of the Nu MPi.

=== 2.0L (F4NA) ===
The Nu FLEX 2.0 L (1,999 cc) engine makes 167 PS (123 kW; 165 hp) at 6,200 rpm with 20.6 kg⋅m (149 lb⋅ft; 202 N⋅m) of torque at 4,700 rpm.

Applications

- Hyundai Creta (GS) (2017–2021)
- Kia Sportage (QL) (2015–2021)

== Nu Hybrid ==
=== 2.0L MPi Hybrid (G4NE) ===
The Nu MPi Hybrid version of this engine combines a 2.0L engine with an electric motor and a battery, the petrol engine makes 150 PS (110 kW; 148 hp) at 6,000 rpm with 18.3 kg⋅m (132 lb⋅ft; 179 N⋅m) of torque at 5,000 rpm.

Applications

- Hyundai Sonata Hybrid (2011–2014)
- Kia Optima Hybrid (2011–2015)

=== 2.0L GDi Hybrid (G4NG) ===
The Nu GDi Hybrid version of this engine combines a 2.0L engine with an electric motor and a 1.76KWh battery, the petrol engine makes 156 PS (115 kW; 154 hp) at 6,000 rpm with 19.3 kg⋅m (140 lb⋅ft; 189 N⋅m) of torque at 5,000 rpm while the electric motor makes 52 PS (38 kW; 51 hp) with 20.9 kg⋅m (151 lb⋅ft; 205 N⋅m) of torque for a combined power rating of 205 PS (151 kW; 202 hp).

Applications

- Hyundai Sonata Hybrid (2014–2019)
- Kia Optima Hybrid (2015–2019)

== Nu LPi ==
Uses Liquefied petroleum gas instead.

=== 2.0L (L4NA) ===
The Nu LPi 2.0 L (1,999 cc) version of the engine makes 151–157 PS (111–115 kW; 149–155 hp) at 6,200 rpm with 19.8–20 kg⋅m (143–145 lb⋅ft; 194–196 N⋅m) of torque at 4,200 rpm.

Applications

- Hyundai Sonata (2012–2023)
- Kia Carens (RP) (2013–2018)
- Kia Optima (2011–2021)

== Engine recall ==
On December 2, 2020, Hyundai and Kia recalled 423,000 vehicles equipped with various engines following a joint review by Hyundai and the NHTSA, of which the Nu GDi engines were a part of. Affected vehicles include the 2016 Hyundai Sonata Hybrid, 2014-2015 Kia Forte and Forte Koup, and the 2014-2015 Kia Soul.

== See also ==
List of Hyundai engines
