= Hyundai Mistra =

Mid-size car

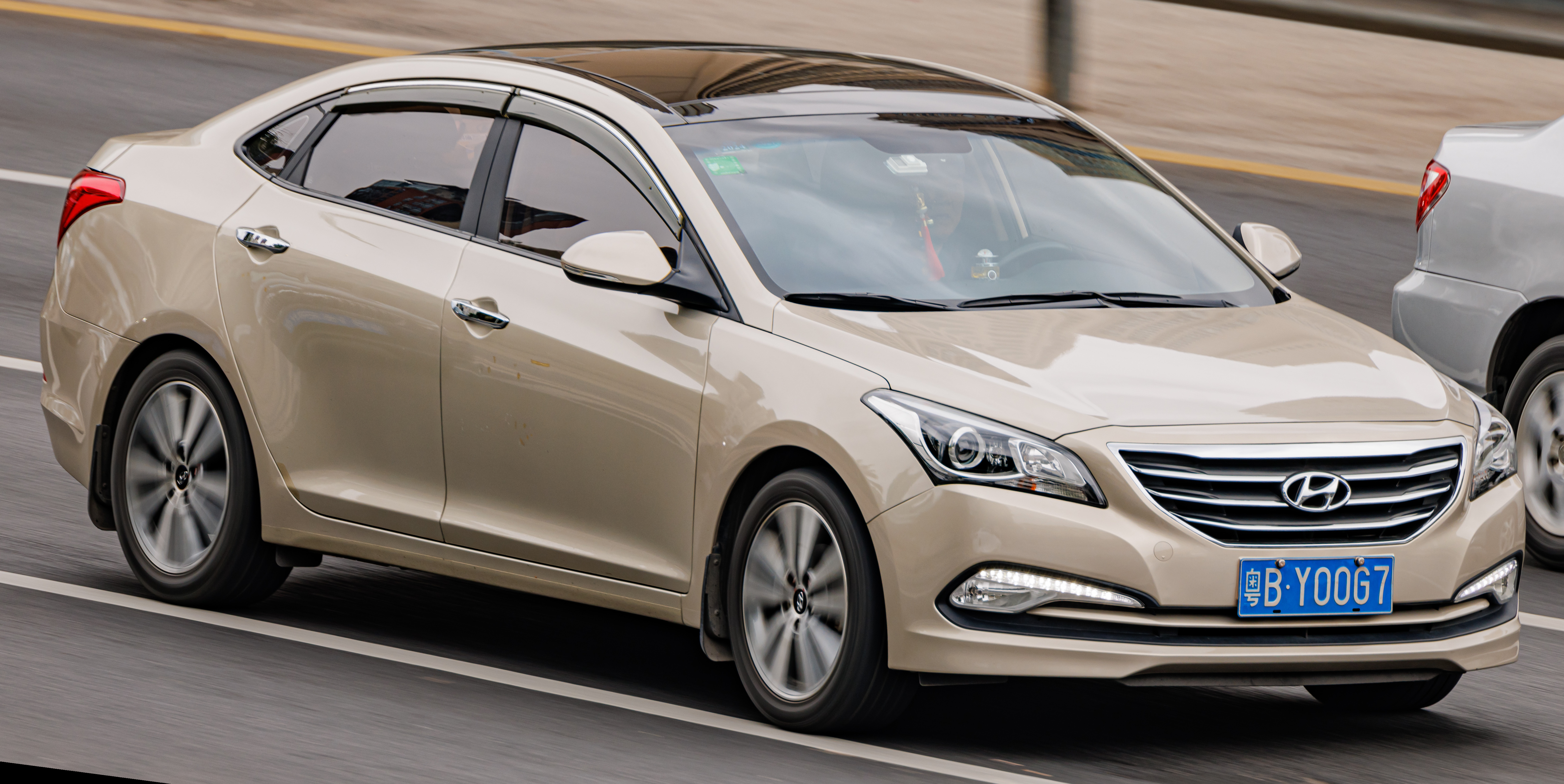
- Hyundai Mistra (first generation)

Overview
- Manufacturer: Hyundai
- Production: 2013–2023

Body and chassis
- Class: Mid-size car (D)
- Layout: Front-engine, front-wheel-drive

The Hyundai Mistra (Chinese: 现代名图; pinyin: Xiàndài Míngtú) is a mid-size sedan manufactured by Hyundai through the Beijing Hyundai joint venture in China. It slots between the Hyundai Elantra and Hyundai Sonata in Hyundai's Chinese vehicle line-up. The first generation was produced between 2013 and 2020 with a facelift launched in 2017, while the second generation was unveiled in 2020, with an electric version also available with a range of 520 km.

== First generation (CF; 2013) ==
First generation (CF)
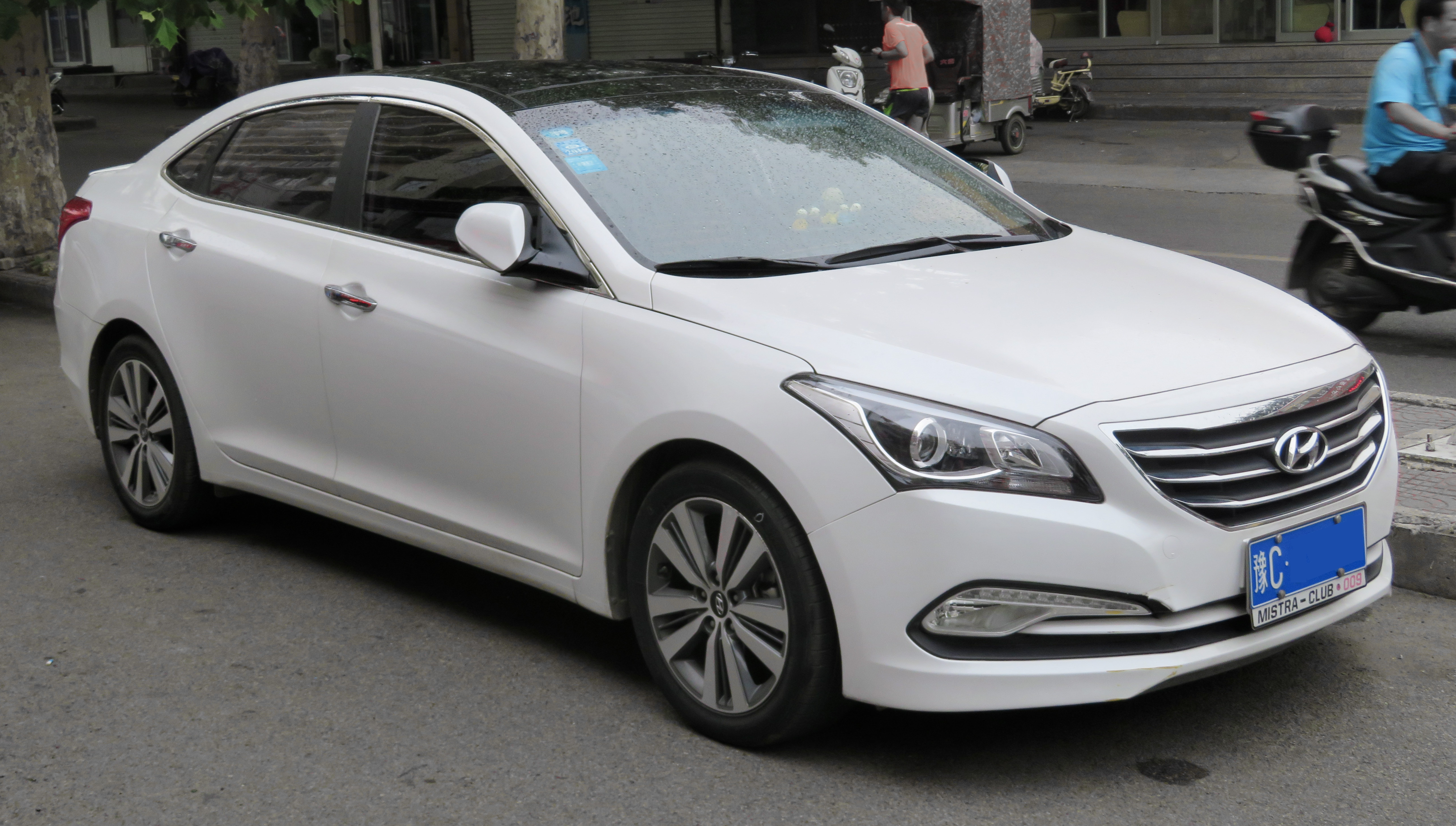

Overview
- Production: 2013–2020
- Model years: 2014–2020
- Assembly: China: Beijing (Beijing Hyundai)

Body and chassis
- Related: Hyundai Sonata; Kia K4 (China)

Powertrain
- Engine: Petrol: 1.6 L Gamma T-GDI I4; 1.8 L Nu MPI I4; 2.0 L Nu MPI I4
- Transmission: 6-speed manual 6-speed automatic 7-speed DCT

Dimensions
- Wheelbase: 2,770 mm (109.1 in)
- Length: 4,710 mm (185.4 in)
- Width: 1,820 mm (71.7 in)
- Height: 1,470 mm (57.9 in)
- Curb weight: 1,435–1,481 kg (3,164–3,265 lb)

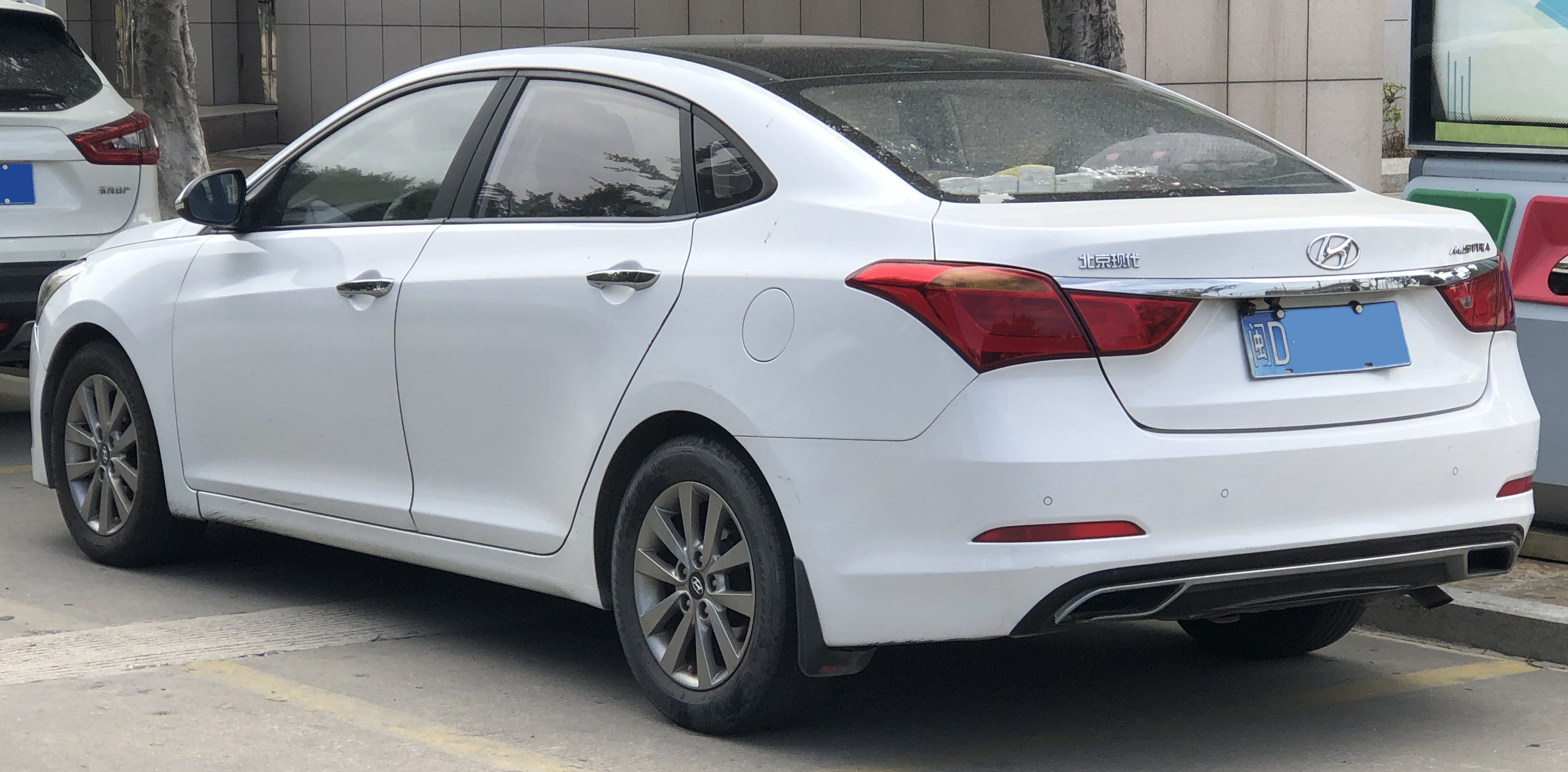
Rear view

The Mistra was first teased as a concept vehicle at the 2013 Shanghai Auto Show and was launched as a production model in the end of 2013, as a model of 2014. It was developed with the Chinese market in mind but may be produced for other markets in the near future.

The Mistra was conceived as a premium compact vehicle, a popular and growing niche within the Chinese automobile market which typically includes, a longer wheelbase, extended rear legroom, higher quality interior trim, and luxury features usually not available on compact vehicles. Included amongst the features of the Mistra are real wood trim and metal trim, an LCD instrument display and leather interior.

=== Engines ===
The Mistra is available with two variants of the Hyundai Nu engine. A 1.8-litre variant producing 143 horsepower, and a 2.0-litre version producing 155 horsepower.

=== 2017 facelift ===
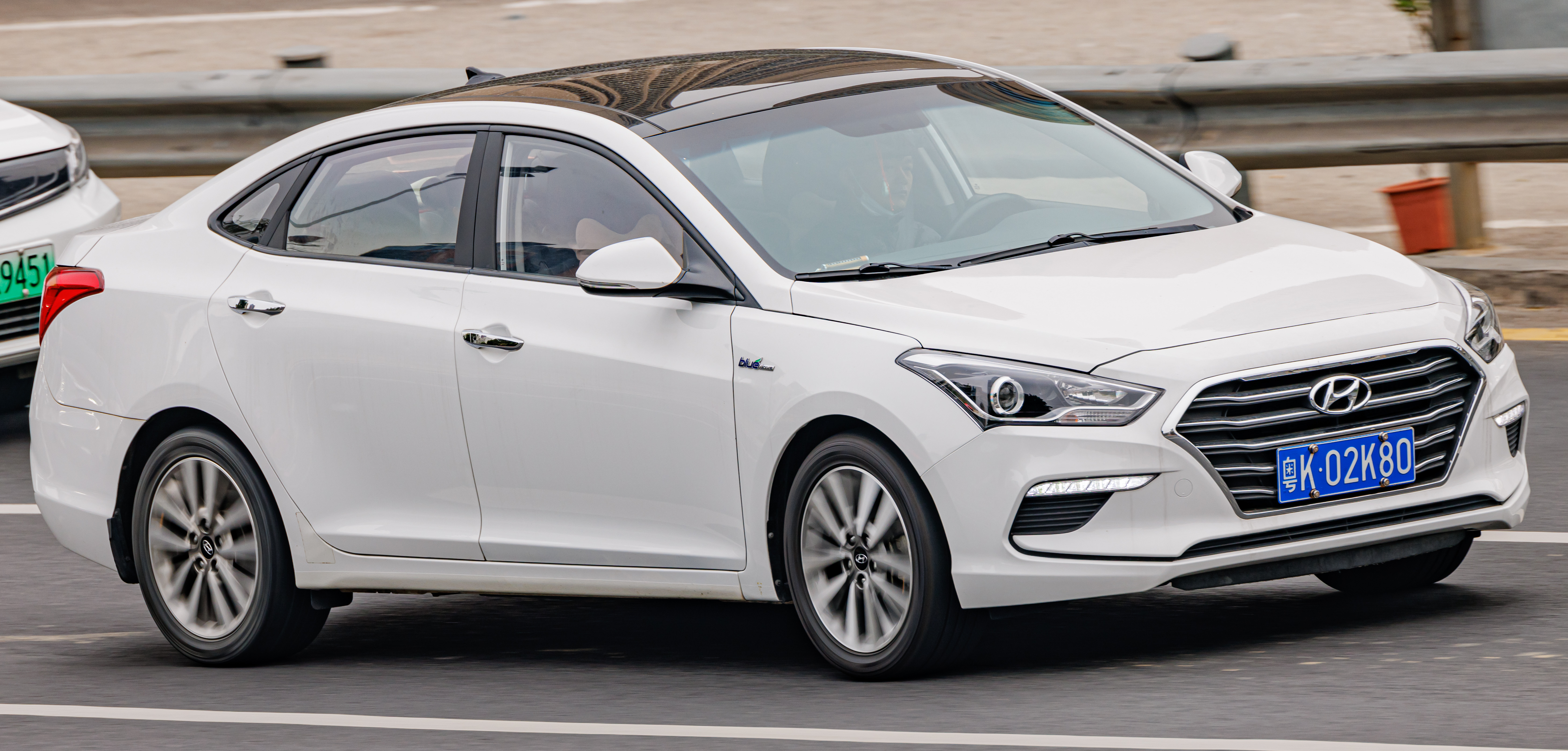
2017 facelift Hyundai Mistra in China

The first generation Hyundai Mistra received a facelift that debuted in April 2017 at the Shanghai Auto Show, and was available to the market in May 2017. The updated exterior styling features a redesigned front end with updated headlamps, front bumper, and grilles and a restyled rear bumper in the rear. The updated interior features an 8-inch touch screen equipped with Apple CarPlay and Baidu CarLife for the infotainment system.

== Second generation (DU2; 2020) ==
Second generation (DU2)
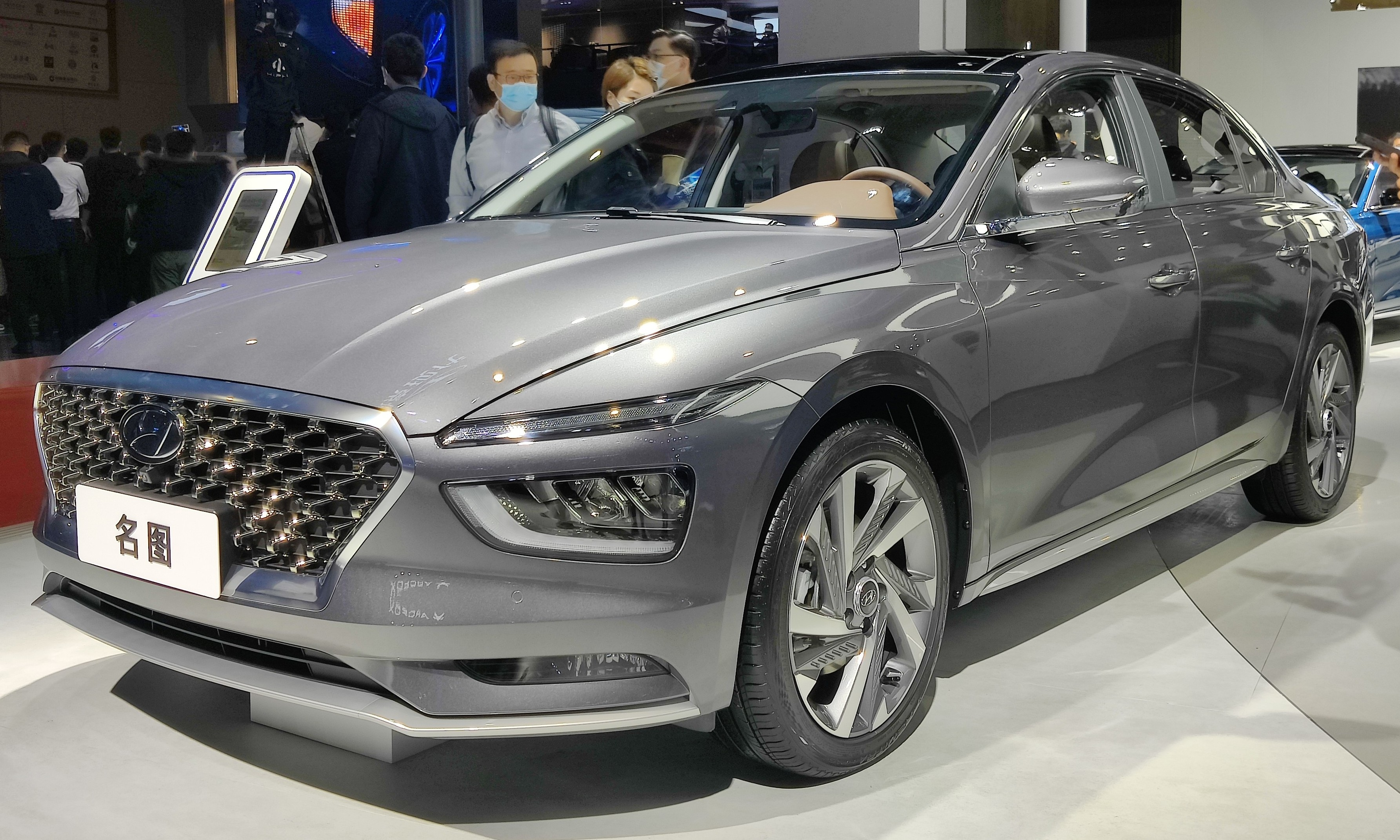

Overview
- Production: 2020–2023
- Model years: 2021–2023
- Assembly: China: Beijing (Beijing Hyundai)

Body and chassis
- Platform: Hyundai-Kia N3
- Related: Hyundai Sonata (DN8)

Powertrain
- Engine: Petrol: 1.5 L Smartstream G1.5 T-GDI I4; 1.8 L Nu MPI I4
- Electric motor: Permanent Magnet Synchronous Reluctance Motor
- Transmission: 7-speed DCT; CVT
- Battery: 56.5 kWh lithium-ion
- Electric range: 520 km (323 mi) NEDC

Dimensions
- Wheelbase: 2,770 mm (109.1 in)
- Length: 4,780 mm (188.2 in) (Petrol); 4,815 mm (189.6 in) (EV)
- Width: 1,815 mm (71.5 in)
- Height: 1,460 mm (57.5 in) (Petrol); 1,470 mm (57.9 in) (EV)
- Curb weight: 1,305–1,392 kg (2,877–3,069 lb) (Petrol); 1,610 kg (3,549 lb) (EV)

The second generation Mistra was first unveiled at the 2020 Guangzhou Auto Show and was planned to be available on the market in 2021. It was developed exclusively for the Chinese market.

=== Engines ===
The second generation Mistra is available with two engines. A 1.8-litre variant producing 143 PS (105 kW; 141 hp) mated to a CVT, and a 1.5-litre turbo version producing 170 PS (125 kW; 168 hp) mated to a 7-speed DCT.

=== Gallery ===
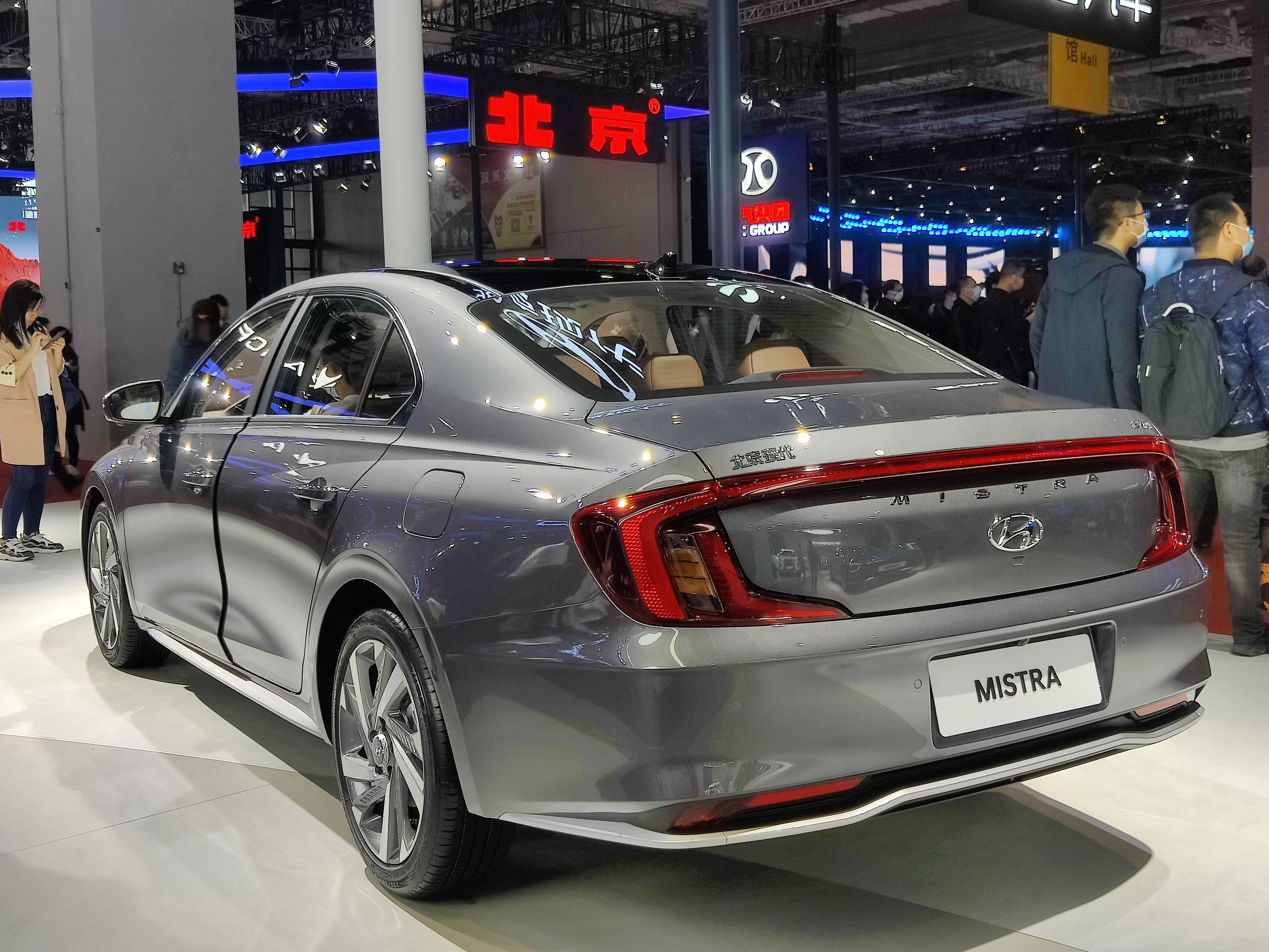
Second generation Hyundai Mistra in China

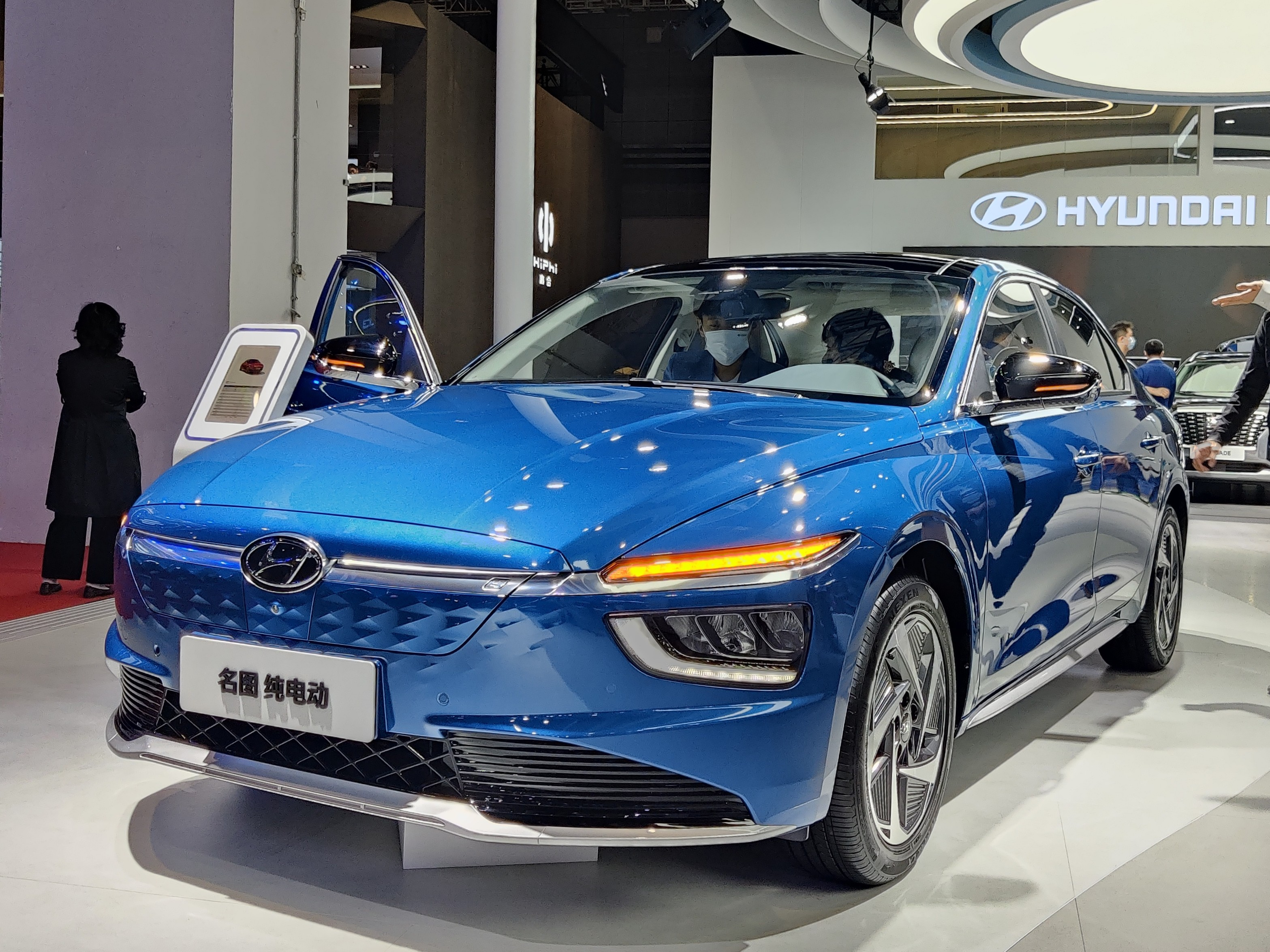
Second generation Hyundai Mistra EV in China

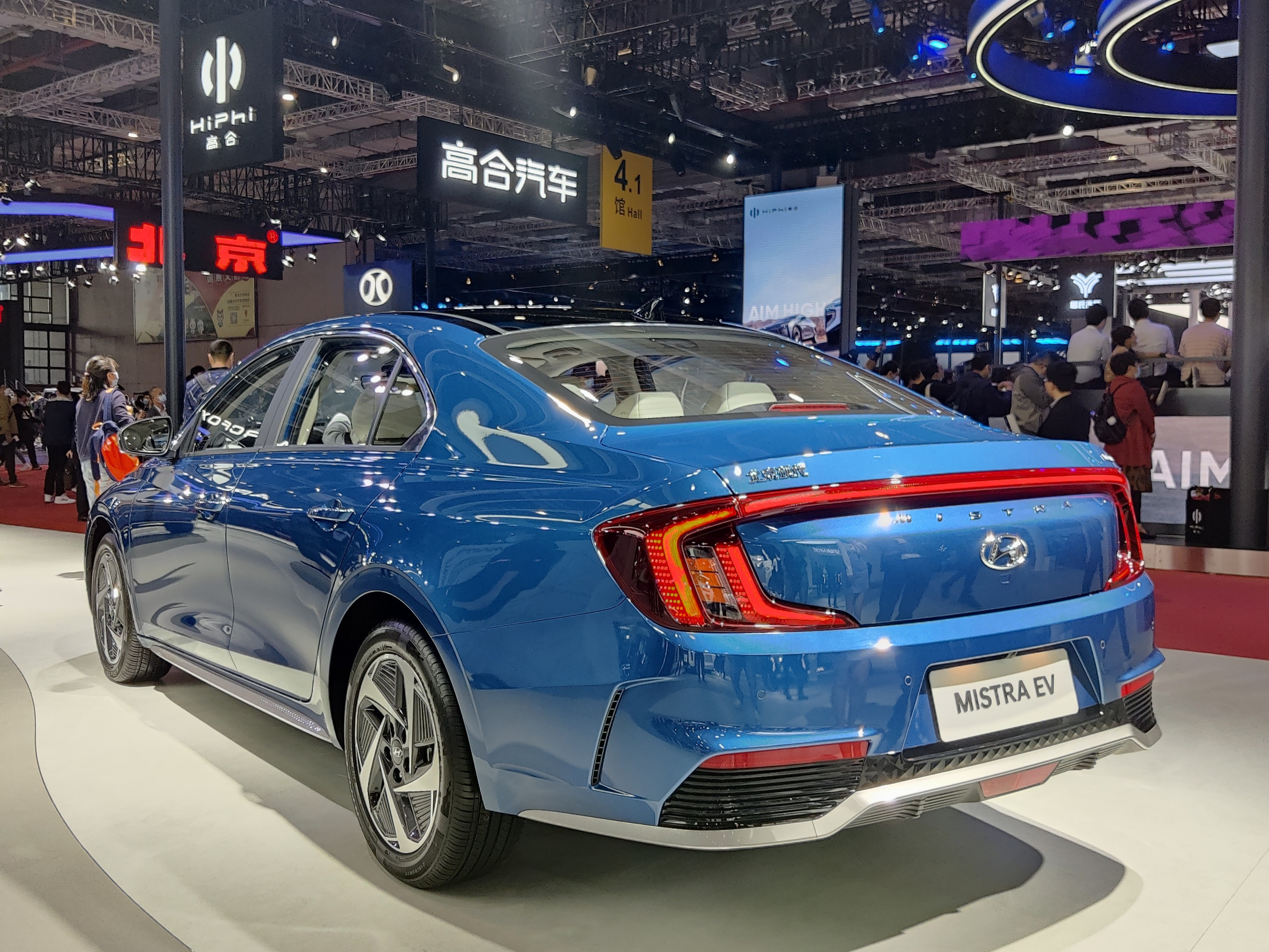
Second generation Hyundai Mistra EV in China

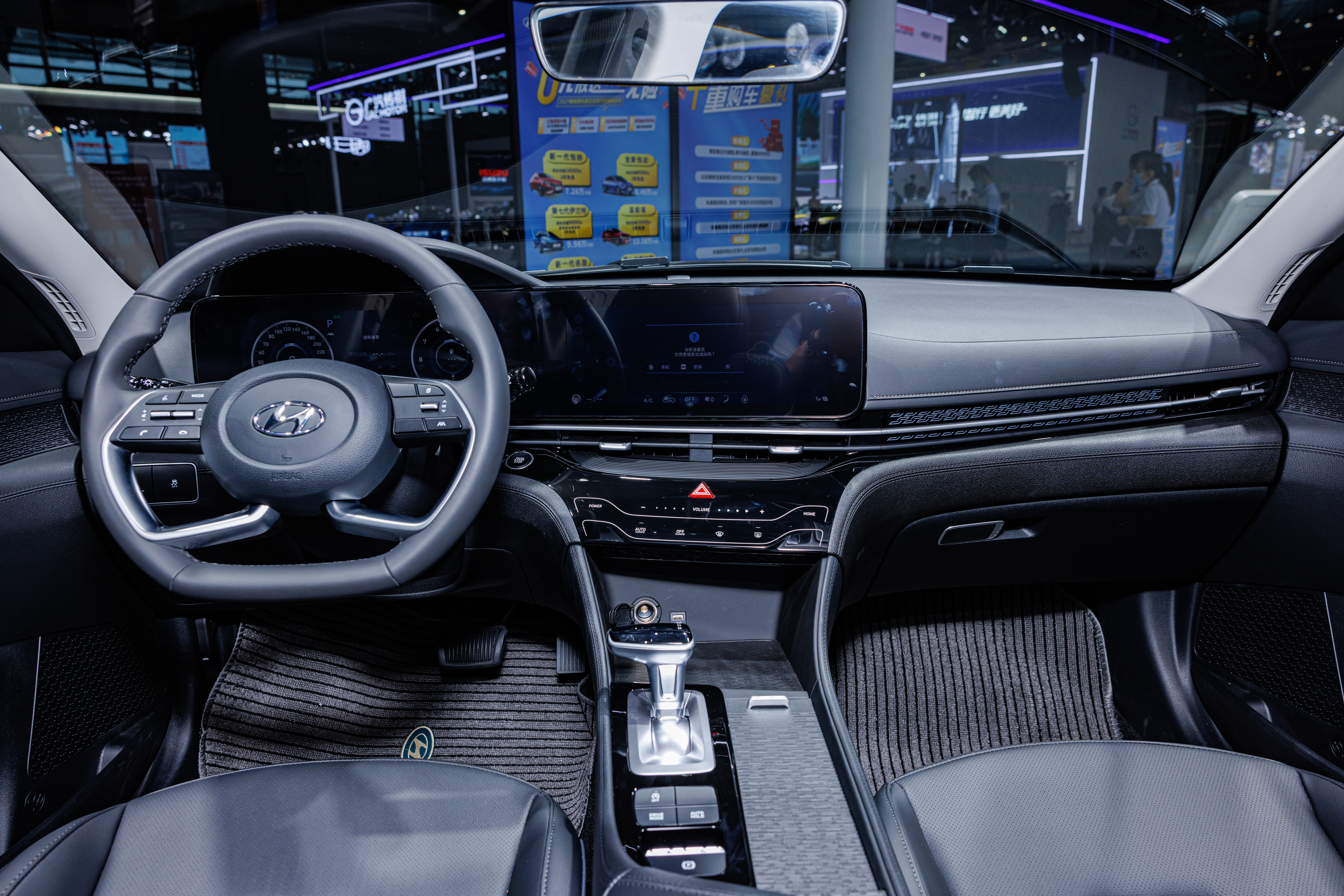
Interior
