= Hyundai i40 =

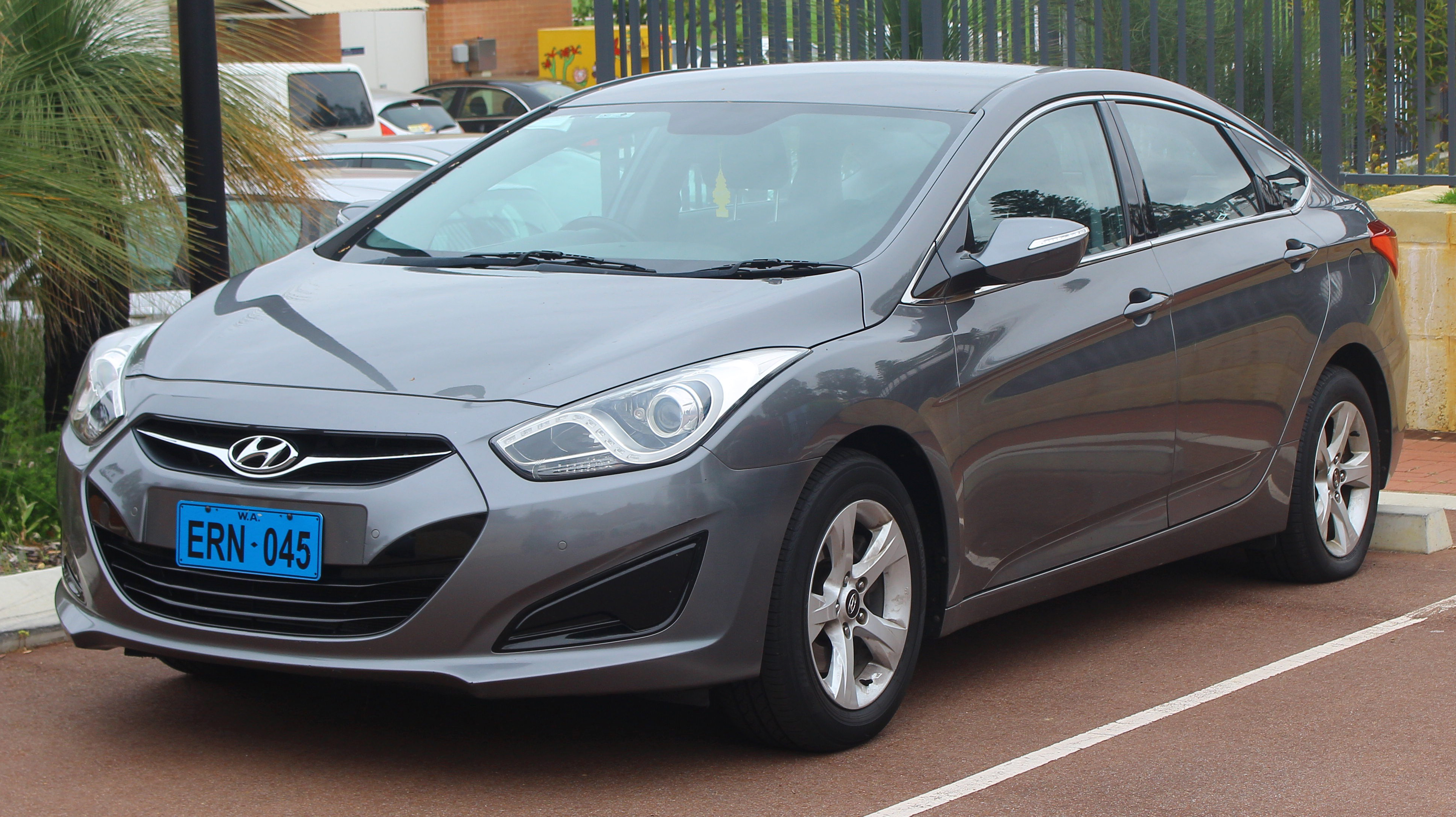
- Pre-facelift Hyundai i40 Sedan 2.0 Active (VF2) in Australia

Overview
- Manufacturer: Hyundai
- Production: 2011–2019
- Assembly: South Korea: Ulsan; Russia: Kaliningrad (Avtotor)
- Designer: Thomas Bürkle

Body and chassis
- Class: Large family car (D)
- Body style: 5-door estate/wagon 4-door sedan/saloon
- Layout: Front-engine, front-wheel-drive
- Related: Hyundai Sonata

Powertrain
- Engine: Petrol: 1.6 L Gamma GDi I4; 2.0 L Nu MPi I4; 2.0 L Nu GDi I4; Diesel: 1.6 L Smartstream D1.6 CRDI I4; 1.7 L U II CRDI I4
- Transmission: 6-speed manual; 6-speed automatic; 7-speed DCT

Dimensions
- Wheelbase: 2,770 mm (109.1 in)
- Length: 4,740–4,775 mm (186.6–188.0 in)
- Width: 1,815 mm (71.5 in)
- Height: 1,470 mm (57.9 in)
- Curb weight: 1,372–1,692 kg (3,025–3,730 lb)

Chronology
- Predecessor: Hyundai Sonata (Europe) (Note: European markets only; globally the Sonata is produced beside the i40.)

The Hyundai i40 (Korean: 현대 아이포티) is a large family car designed primarily for the European market by the South Korean manufacturer Hyundai between 2011 and 2019. Sharing its platform with the Hyundai Sonata, the i40 sedan was unveiled at the 2011 Barcelona Motor Show.

== Overview ==
The car was designed at Hyundai's European R&D facilities in Rüsselsheim, Germany. It is manufactured at the Ulsan plant in South Korea.

The Hyundai i40 is described as featuring Hyundai's 'fluidic sculpture' design language, and was launched in Europe initially as an estate/wagon (marketed as the i40 Tourer) with a saloon was due in 2011. The boot space is 553 litres, increasing to 1,719 litres with the rear seats folded down.

In some markets, the Sonata remains on sale as a separate model, such as the United States, where the i40 is unavailable. The estate/wagon variant of the i40 was released in Europe and South Korea in September 2011, followed by the sedan variant in January 2012, and it is also sold in Australia and New Zealand.

For Malaysia, Hyundai launched the i40 at the 2013 Kuala Lumpur International Motor Show, in both sedan and tourer specifications. It is placed above the Hyundai Sonata. The engine is the two litre GDI motor which is linked to a paddle shifted six speed automatic gearbox.

Due to slowing sales of mid-sized cars worldwide, the i40 was discontinued in markets such as Australia and New Zealand in early 2019, leaving the Sonata to cater for the segment. The i40 has since been discontinued in Europe in 2019.

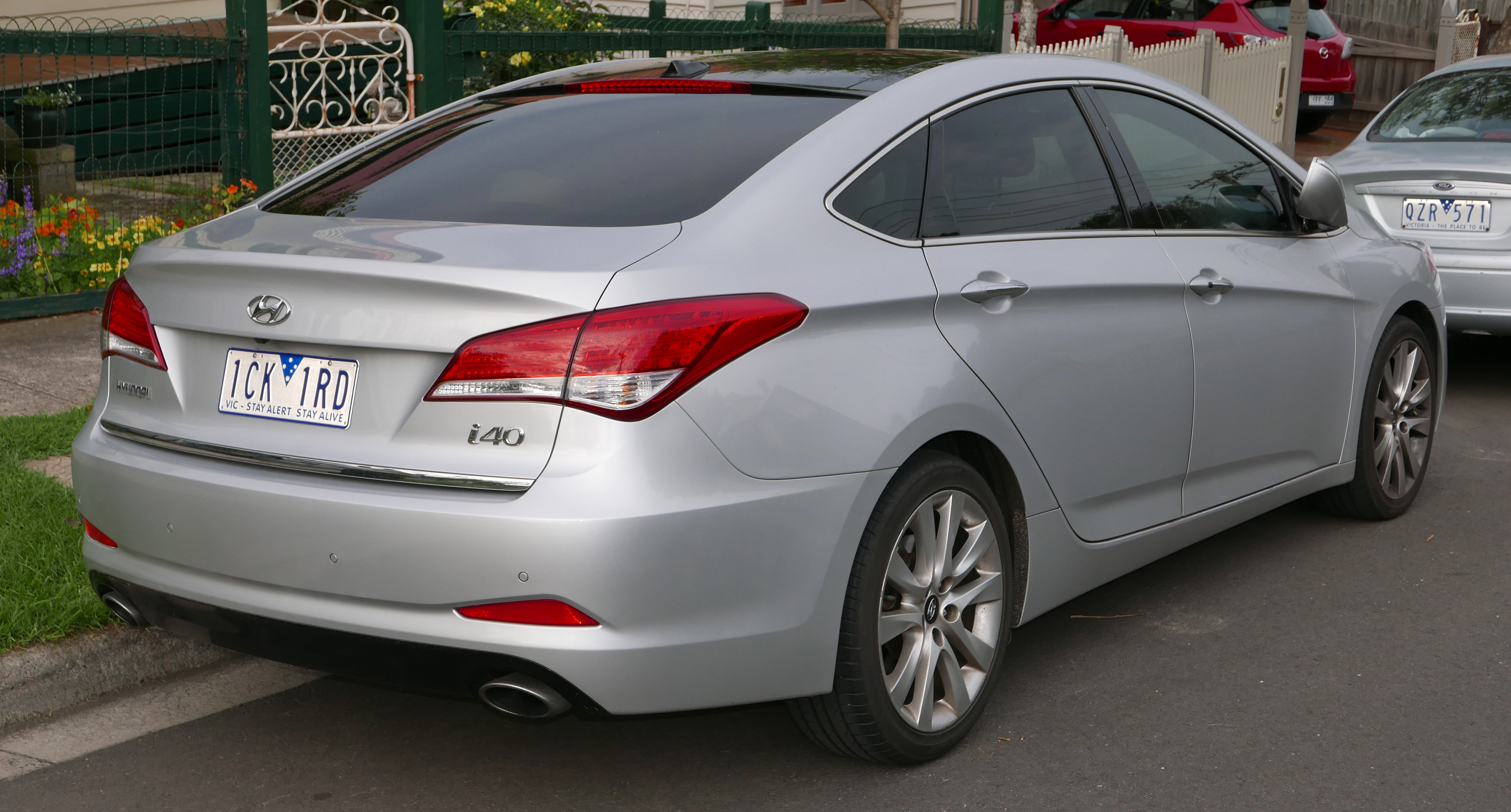
Sedan (pre-facelift)

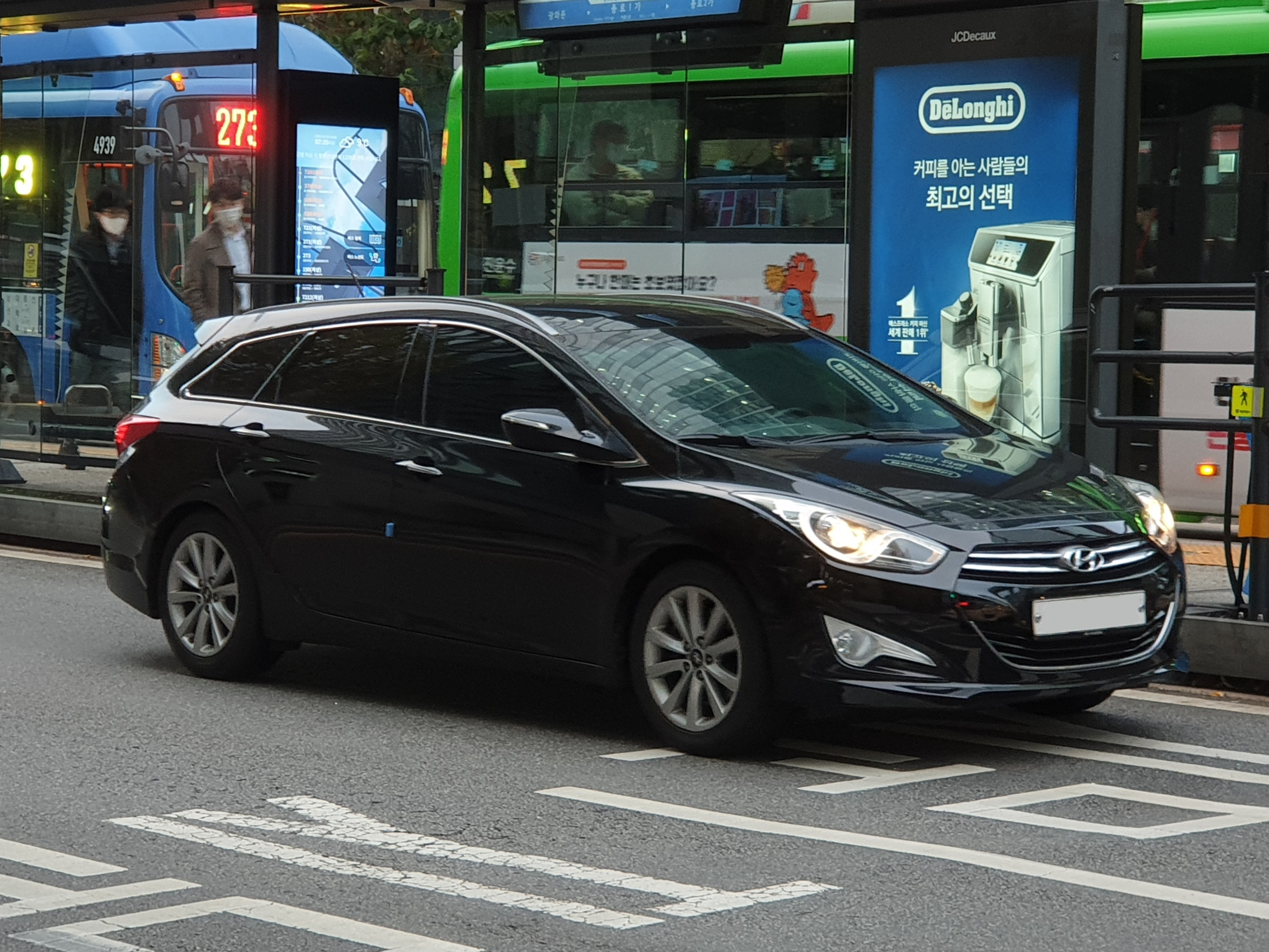
Pre-facelift i40 Station Wagon 2.0 GDi in South Korea

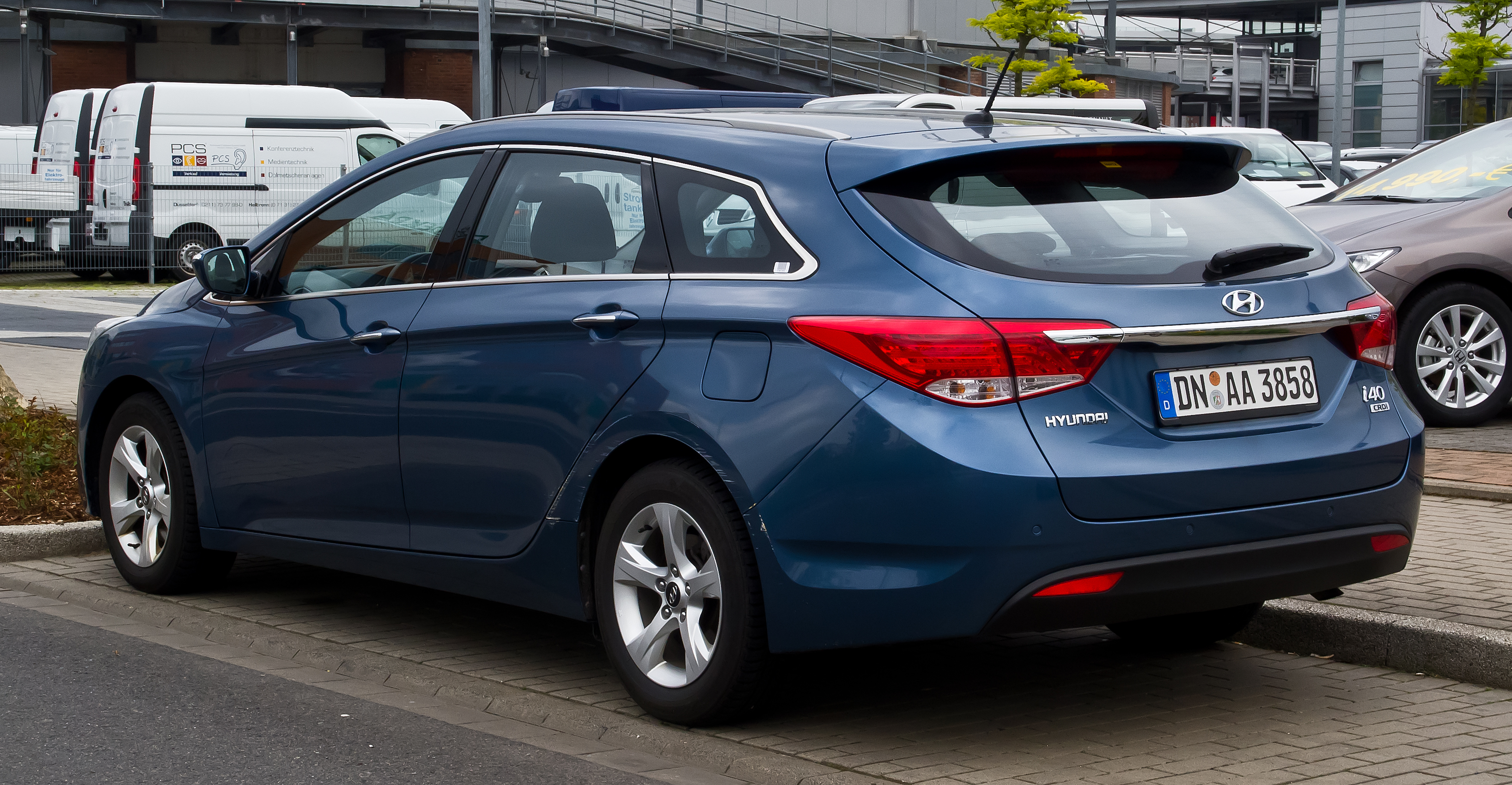
Estate (pre-facelift)

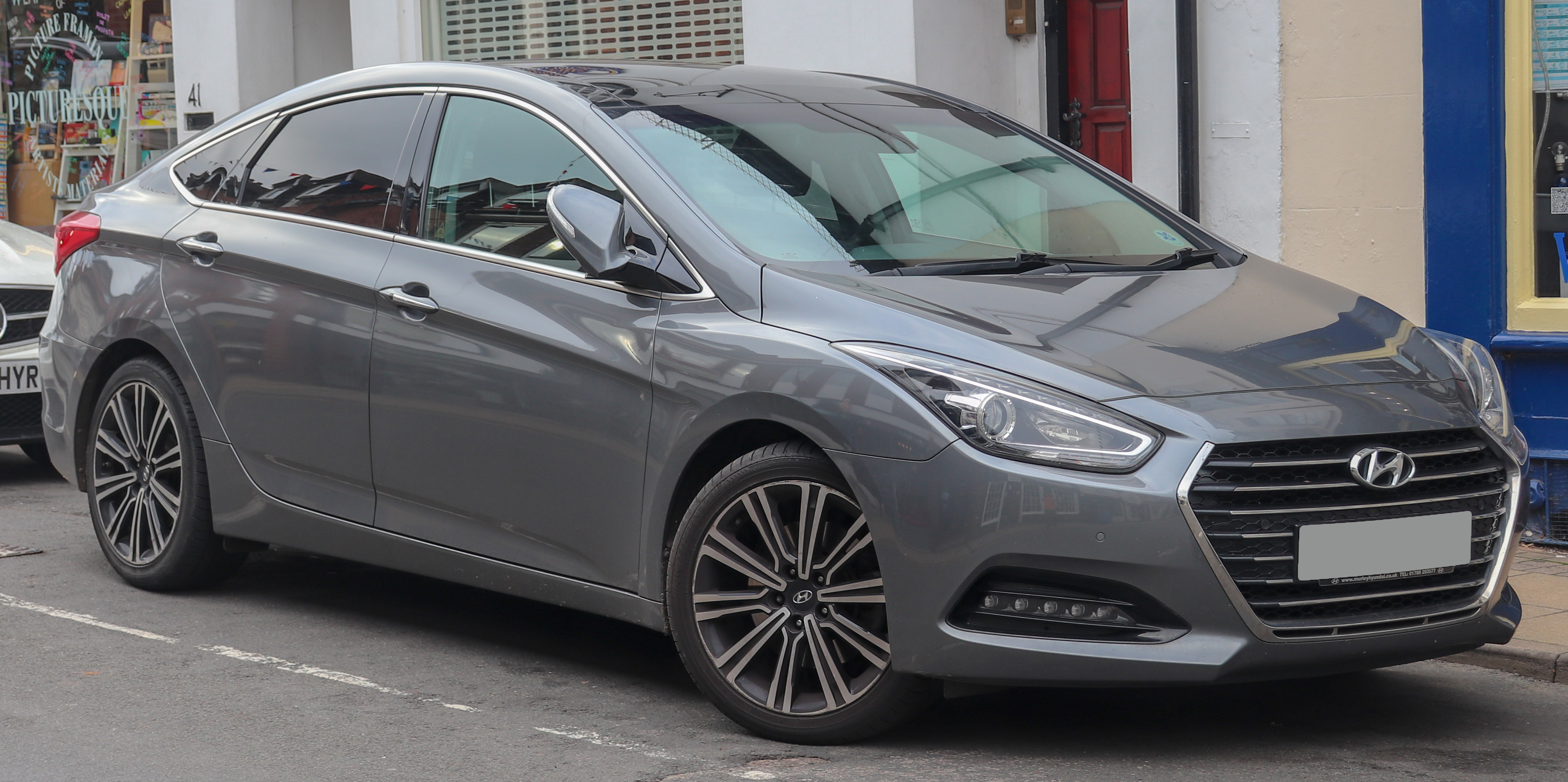
Facelift i40 Sedan 1.7 CRDi Premium in the UK

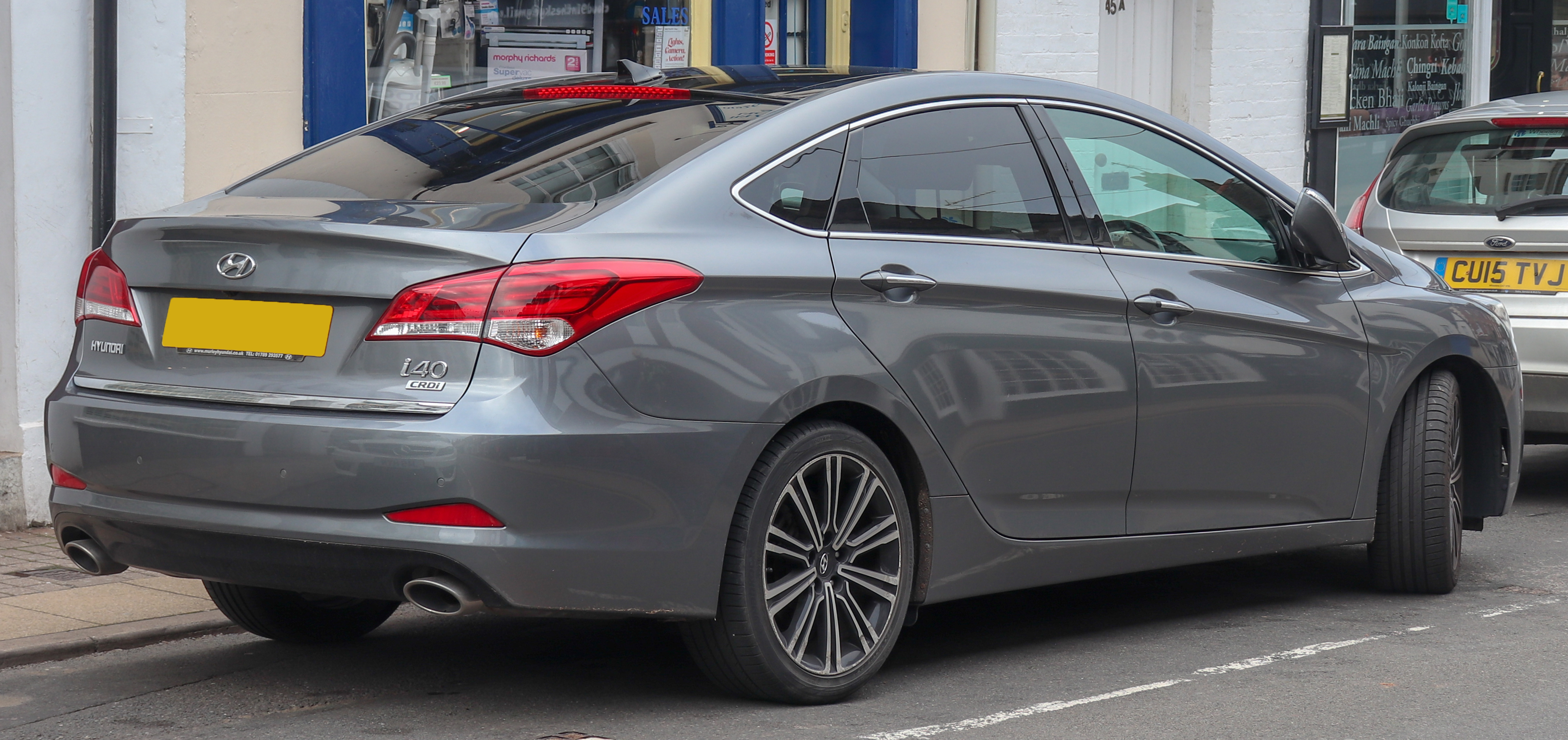
Facelift i40 Sedan 1.7 CRDi Premium in the UK

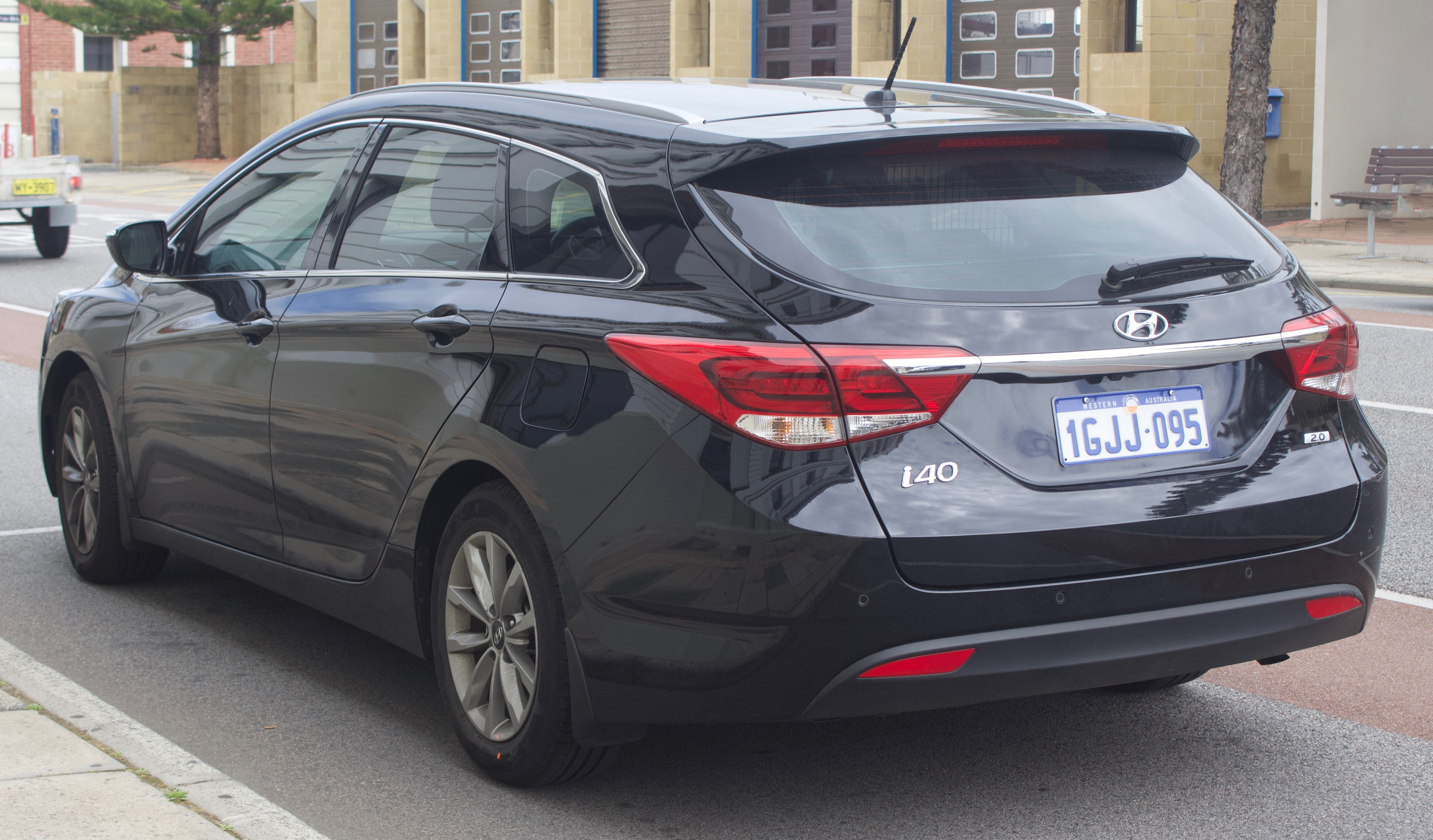
Facelift i40 Station Wagon 2.0 Active (VF4) in Australia

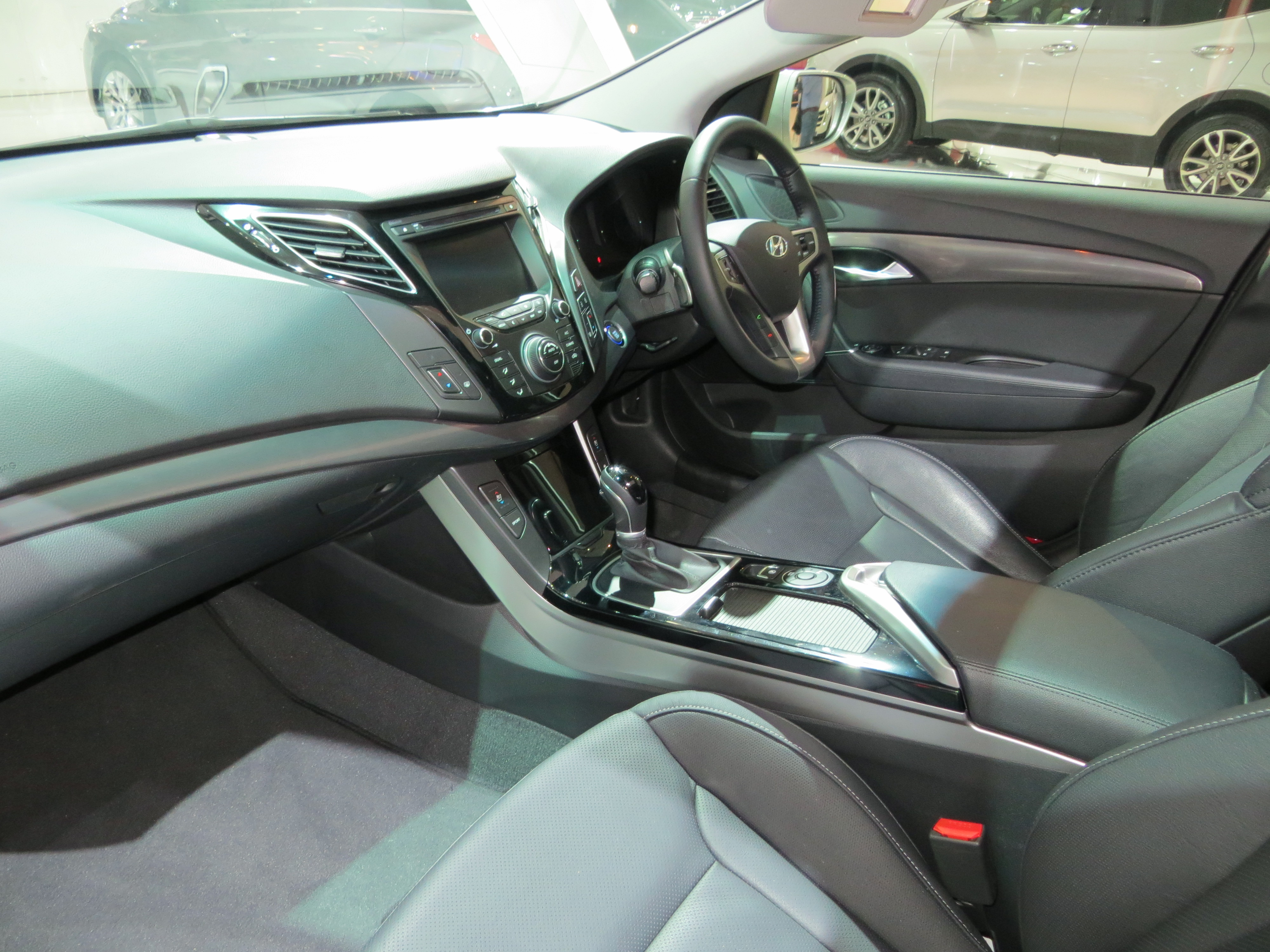
Interior

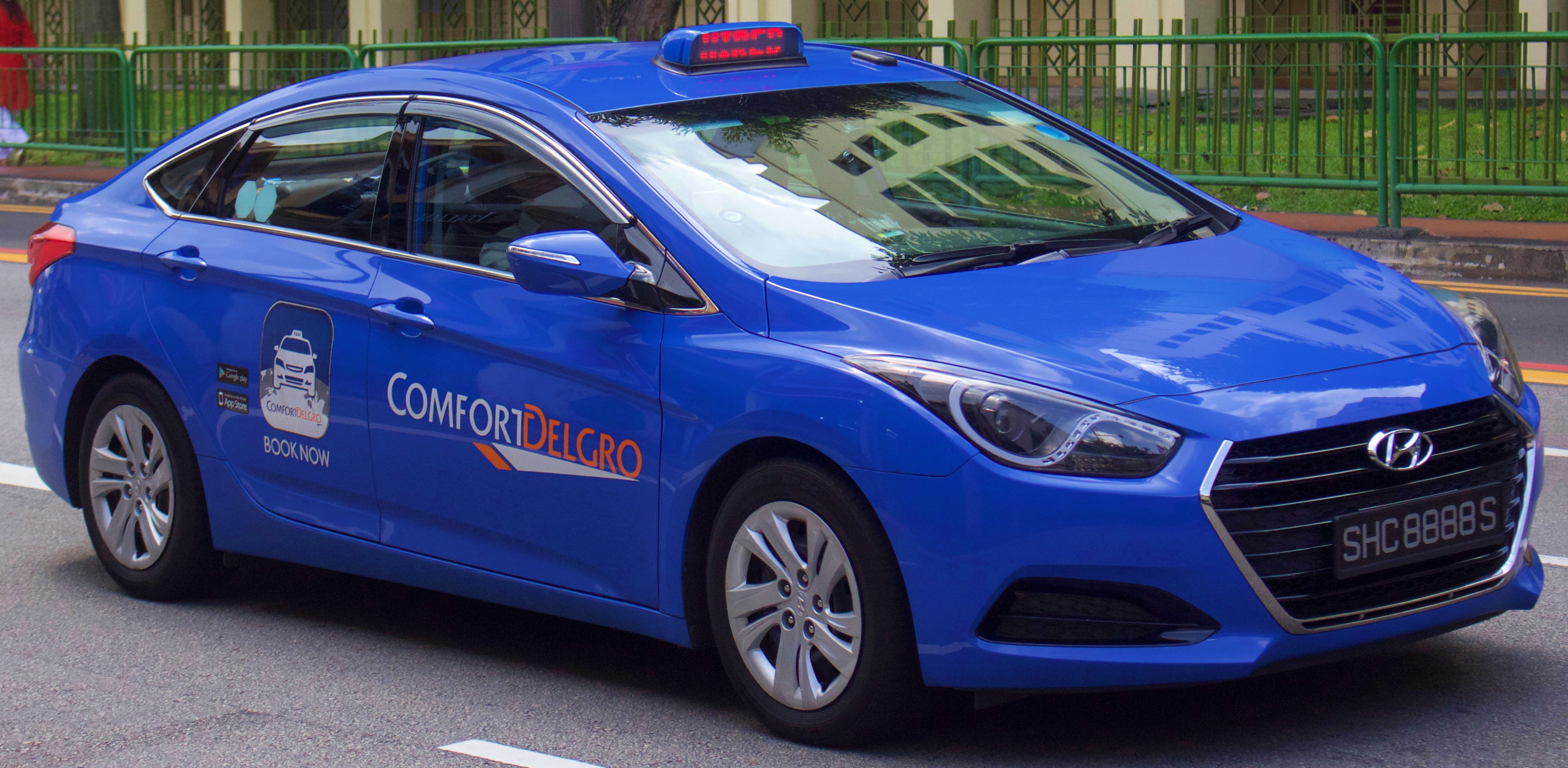
Facelift i40 1.7 CRDi (VF4) ComfortDelGro taxi in Singapore

== Powertrain ==
A 'BlueDrive' option includes Intelligent Stop & Go (ISG) start-stop system and 16 inch rolling resistance tyres, resulting in a reduced CO2 of 113g/km for the 114 bhp (85 kW; 116 PS) diesel. Depending on market, up to three engines are available from a total of four, a 1.7 L diesel in two states of tune (114 bhp and 134 bhp) and three petrol units 1.6 L (133 bhp) and 2.0 L (175 bhp) GDI (or a 2.0L (164 bhp) MPi petrol units. A 'BlueDrive' option includes Intelligent Stop & Go (ISG) start-stop system and 16 inch rolling resistance tyres, resulting in a reduced CO_{2} of 113g/km for the 114 bhp (85 kW; 116 PS) diesel.

Model	Type/code	Transmission	Power	Torque	Acceleration 0–100 km/h (0-62 mph)	Top Speed
Petrol engines
Gamma 1.6 GDi	1,591 cc (97.1 cu in) I4	6-speed manual	135 PS (99 kW; 133 hp) at 6,300 rpm	16.8 kg⋅m (165 N⋅m; 122 lbf⋅ft) at 4,850 rpm	11.6s	195 km/h (121 mph)
Nu 2.0 MPi	1,999 cc (122.0 cu in) I4	6-speed manual	166 PS (122 kW; 164 hp) at 6,500 rpm 152 PS (112 kW; 150 hp) at 6,200 rpm	20.5 kg⋅m (201 N⋅m; 148 lbf⋅ft) at 4,800 rpm 19.6 kg⋅m (192 N⋅m; 142 lbf⋅ft) at 4,000 rpm	10.6s	201 km/h (125 mph)
Nu 2.0 MPi	1,999 cc (122.0 cu in) I4	6-speed automatic	166 PS (122 kW; 164 hp) at 6,500 rpm 152 PS (112 kW; 150 hp) at 6,200 rpm	20.5 kg⋅m (201 N⋅m; 148 lbf⋅ft) at 4,800 rpm 19.6 kg⋅m (192 N⋅m; 142 lbf⋅ft) at 4,000 rpm	11.1s	198 km/h (123 mph)
Nu 2.0 GDi	1,999 cc (122.0 cu in) I4	6-speed manual	178 PS (131 kW; 176 hp) at 6,500 rpm 164 PS (121 kW; 162 hp) at 6,200 rpm	21.8 kg⋅m (214 N⋅m; 158 lbf⋅ft) at 4,700 rpm 20.7 kg⋅m (203 N⋅m; 150 lbf⋅ft) at 4,700 rpm	9.6s-9.9s	210–212 km/h (130–132 mph)
Nu 2.0 GDi	1,999 cc (122.0 cu in) I4	6-speed automatic	178 PS (131 kW; 176 hp) at 6,500 rpm 164 PS (121 kW; 162 hp) at 6,200 rpm	21.8 kg⋅m (214 N⋅m; 158 lbf⋅ft) at 4,700 rpm 20.7 kg⋅m (203 N⋅m; 150 lbf⋅ft) at 4,700 rpm	10.8s	205 km/h (127 mph)
Diesel engines
Smartstream D1.6 CRDi	1,598 cc (97.5 cu in) I4	6-speed manual	116 PS (85 kW; 114 hp) at 4,000 rpm	28.6 kg⋅m (280 N⋅m; 207 lbf⋅ft) at 1,500–2,750 rpm	12.6s	187 km/h (116 mph)
Smartstream D1.6 CRDi	1,598 cc (97.5 cu in) I4	6-speed manual	136 PS (100 kW; 134 hp) at 4,000 rpm	28.6 kg⋅m (280 N⋅m; 207 lbf⋅ft) at 1,500-3,000 rpm	10.5s	195 km/h (121 mph)
Smartstream D1.6 CRDi	1,598 cc (97.5 cu in) I4	7-speed DCT	136 PS (100 kW; 134 hp) at 4,000 rpm	32.6 kg⋅m (320 N⋅m; 236 lbf⋅ft) at 2,000-2,250 rpm	11.0s	194 km/h (121 mph)
U II 1.7 CRDi	1,685 cc (102.8 cu in) I4	6-speed manual	116 PS (85 kW; 114 hp) at 4,000 rpm	28.6 kg⋅m (280 N⋅m; 207 lbf⋅ft) at 1,250–2,500 rpm	12.6s	190 km/h (118 mph)
U II 1.7 CRDi	1,685 cc (102.8 cu in) I4	6-speed manual	136 PS (100 kW; 134 hp) at 4,000 rpm	33 kg⋅m (324 N⋅m; 239 lbf⋅ft) at 1,750-2,750 rpm	10.5s	200 km/h (124 mph)
U II 1.7 CRDi	1,685 cc (102.8 cu in) I4	6-speed automatic	136 PS (100 kW; 134 hp) at 4,000 rpm 141 PS (104 kW; 139 hp) at 4,000 rpm	33 kg⋅m (324 N⋅m; 239 lbf⋅ft) at 1,750-2,750 rpm 34.7 kg⋅m (340 N⋅m; 251 lbf⋅ft) at 1,750-2,500 rpm	11.6s	196 km/h (122 mph)
U II 1.7 CRDi	1,685 cc (102.8 cu in) I4	7-speed DCT	136 PS (100 kW; 134 hp) at 4,000 rpm 141 PS (104 kW; 139 hp) at 4,000 rpm	33 kg⋅m (324 N⋅m; 239 lbf⋅ft) at 1,750-2,750 rpm 34.7 kg⋅m (340 N⋅m; 251 lbf⋅ft) at 1,750-2,500 rpm	11.0s	200 km/h (124 mph)

== Safety ==
Euro NCAP test results for a LHD, five door hatchback variant on a registration from 2011:

Test	Score	Points
Overall:	5/5 stars	97
Adult occupant:	92%	33
Child occupant:	86%	42
Pedestrian:	43%	16
Safety assist:	86%	6

ANCAP test results Hyundai i40 (2011)
Test	Score
Overall	5 /5 stars
Frontal offset	14.18/16
Side impact	16/16
Pole	2/2
Seat belt reminders	2/3
Whiplash protection	Not Assessed
Pedestrian protection	Marginal
Electronic stability control	Standard

ANCAP test results Hyundai i40 (2012)
Test	Score
Overall	5 /5 stars
Frontal offset	14.18/16
Side impact	16/16
Pole	2/2
Seat belt reminders	2/3
Whiplash protection	Good
Pedestrian protection	Marginal
Electronic stability control	Standard

== Marketing ==
Hyundai Motor supplied the i40 estate for use in the 2011 FIFA Beach Soccer World Cup.

== Awards ==
The Hyundai i40 won the 2011 Eurocarbody Golden Award.
