= Kia K4 (China) =

Compact sedan for Chinese market

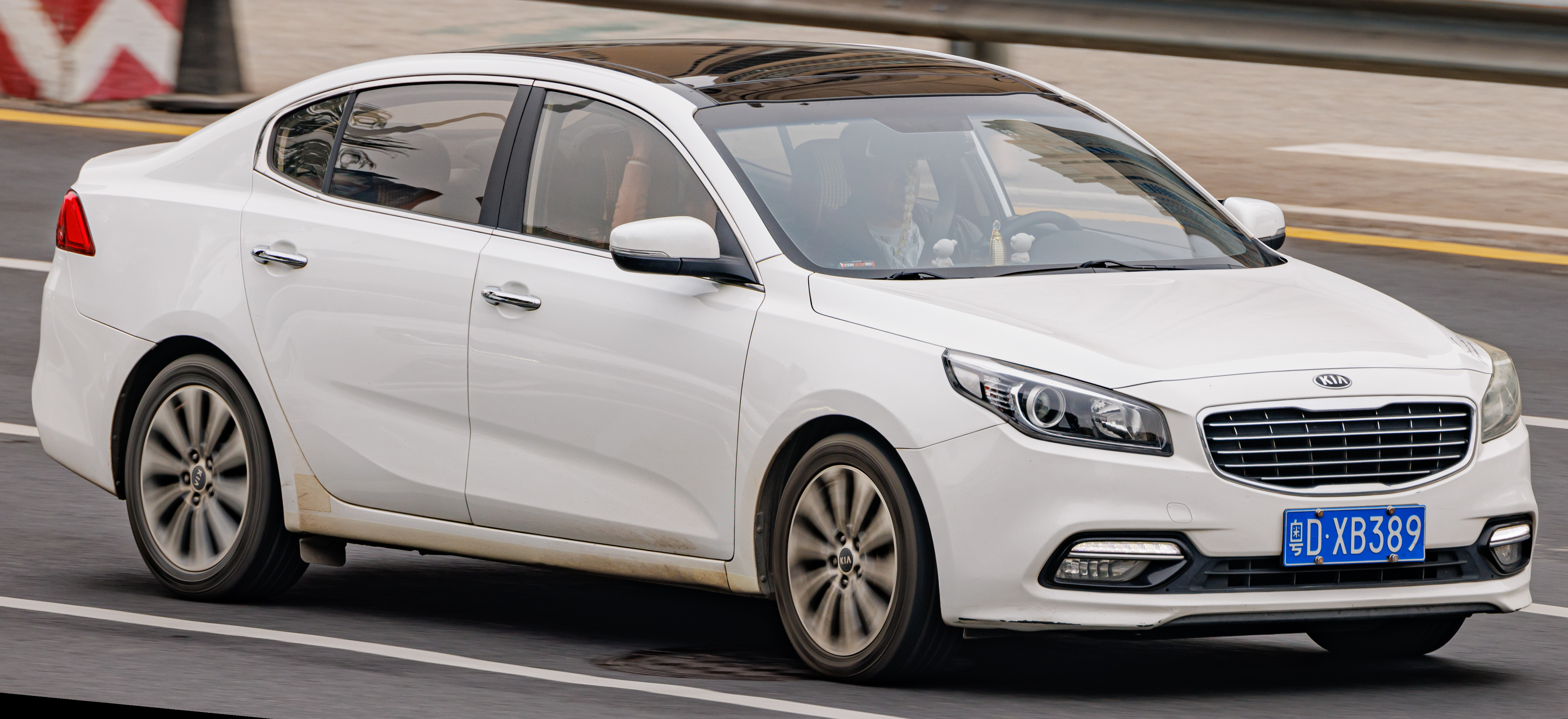

Overview
- Manufacturer: Kia
- Model code: PF
- Production: 2014–2020
- Assembly: China: Yancheng (Yancheng Plant) (DYK)

Body and chassis
- Class: Compact car (C)
- Body style: 4-door sedan
- Layout: Front-engine, front-wheel drive
- Related: Hyundai Mistra (CF)

Powertrain
- Engine: 1.6 L Gamma T-GDi I4 (petrol); 1.8 L Nu MPi I4 (petrol); 2.0 L Nu MPi I4 (petrol)
- Transmission: 6-speed manual; 6-speed automatic; 7-speed DCT

Dimensions
- Wheelbase: 2,770 mm (109.1 in)
- Length: 4,720 mm (185.8 in)
- Width: 1,815 mm (71.5 in)
- Height: 1,465 mm (57.7 in)

The Kia K4 (Chinese: 起亚凯绅; pinyin: Qǐyà kǎi shēn) is a compact sedan produced by Dongfeng Yueda Kia from 2014 to 2020. It was designed exclusively for the Chinese market, and was positioned between the Kia K3 and Kia K5. The Kia K4 was previewed on the 2014 Beijing Auto Show by the Kia K4 Concept.

== Overview ==
The production version of the Kia K4 shares the same platform as the Hyundai Mistra, and was launched on to the Chinese car market in the second half of 2014 and was unveiled in August 2014, at the 2014 Chengdu Auto Show. The market launch for the production Kia K4 was in October 2014.

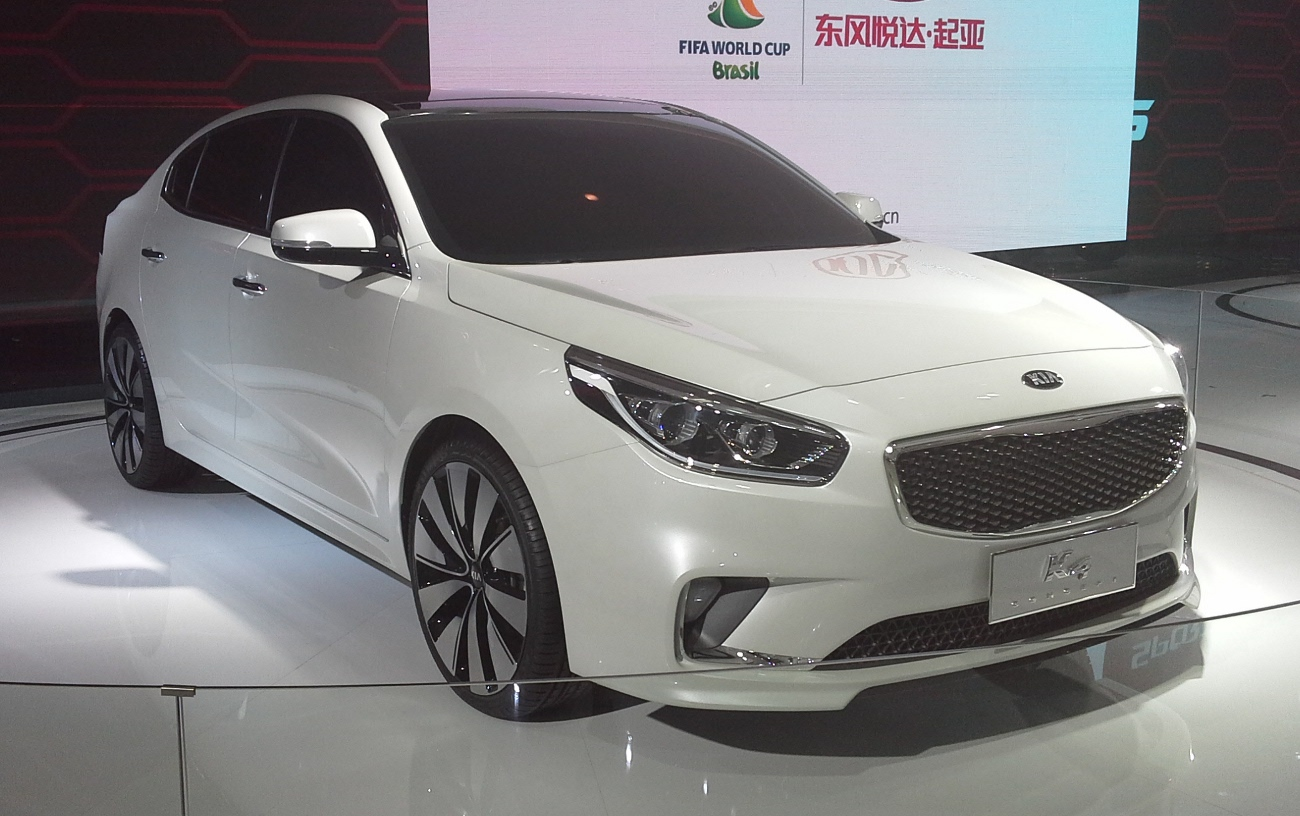
Kia K4 Concept teased on the 2014 Beijing Auto Show

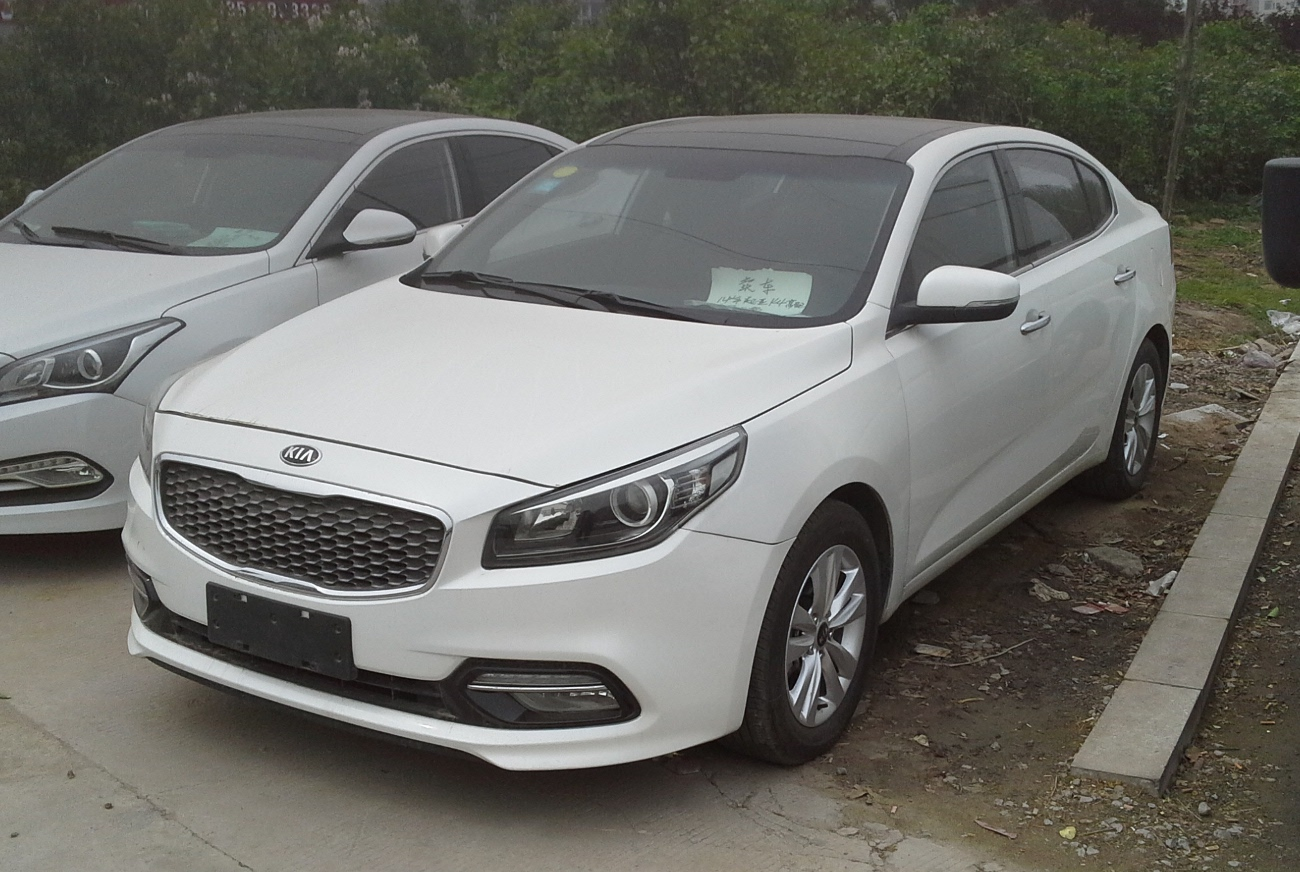
Kia K4

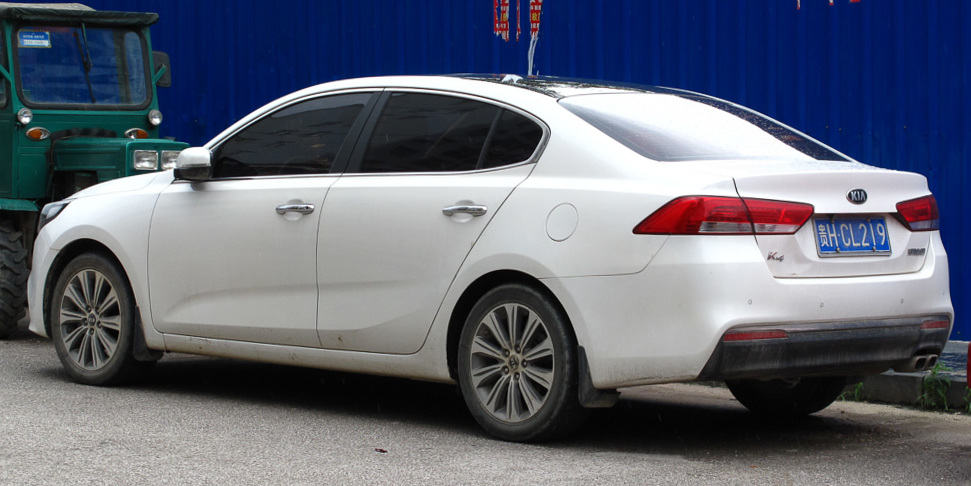
Rear view

=== 2018 facelift ===
A facelift was revealed in 2018 called the Kia K4 Cachet featuring new front and rear end styling.

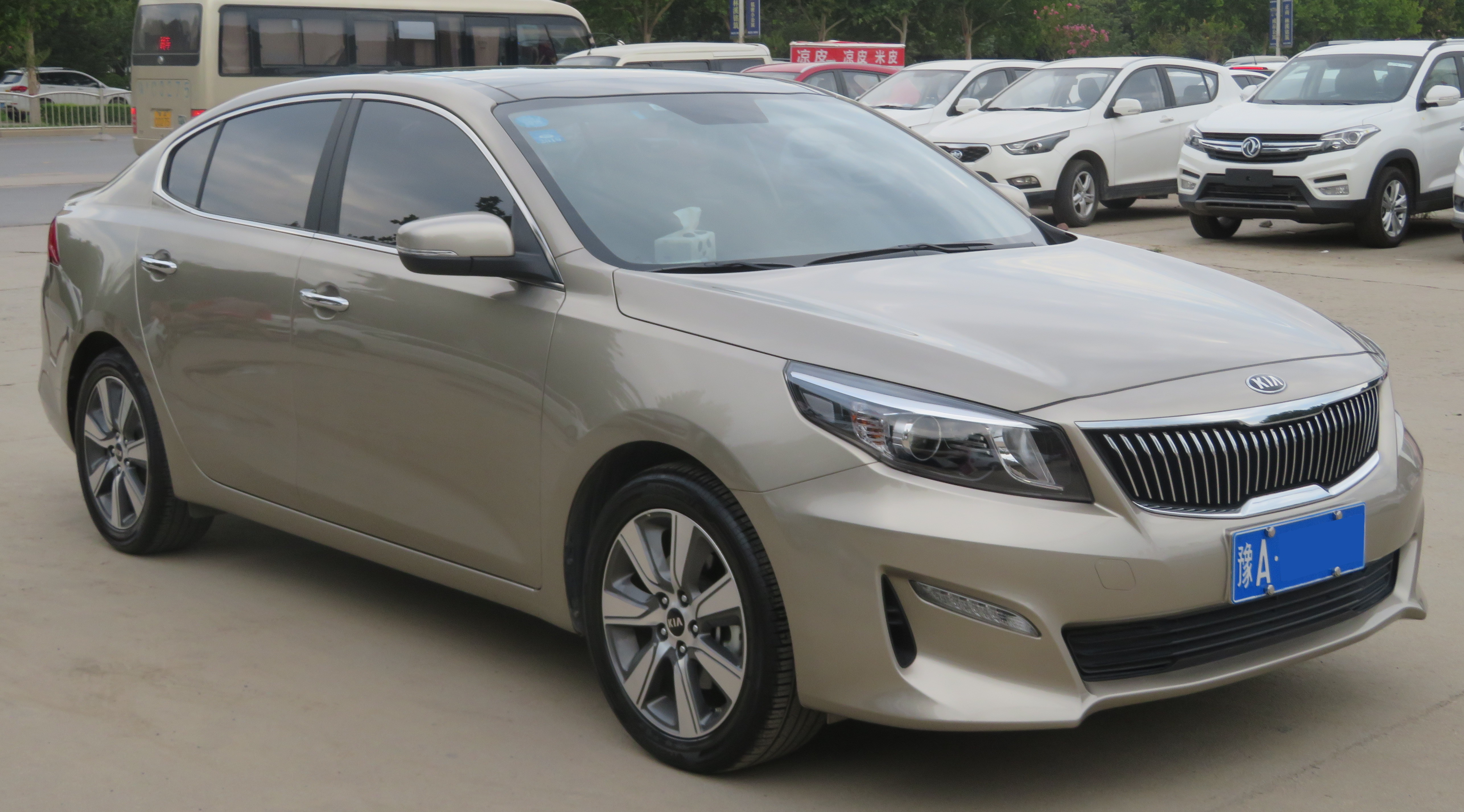
2018 Kia K4 (facelift)

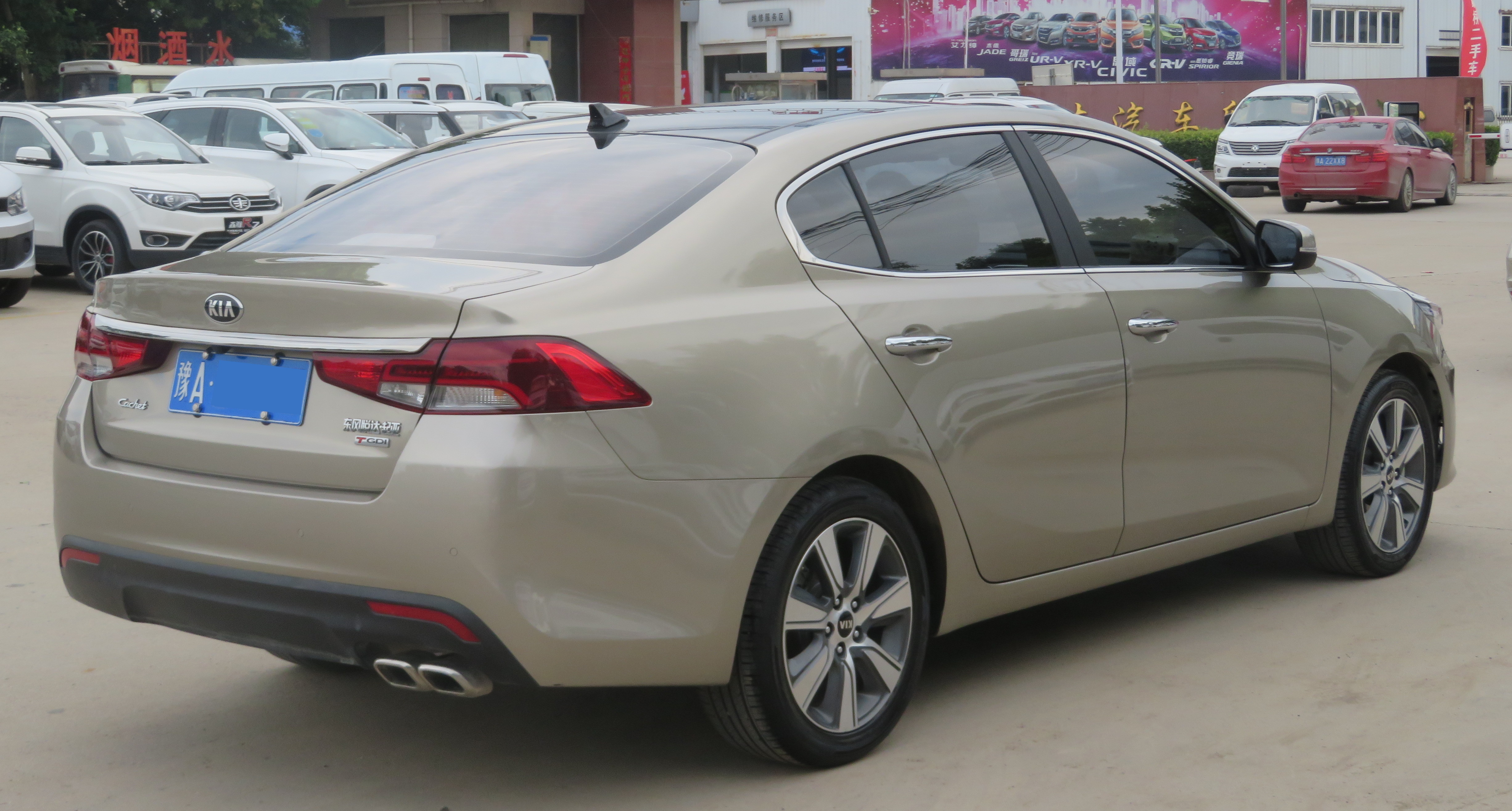
2018 Kia K4 (facelift)
