= Hyundai Gamma engine =

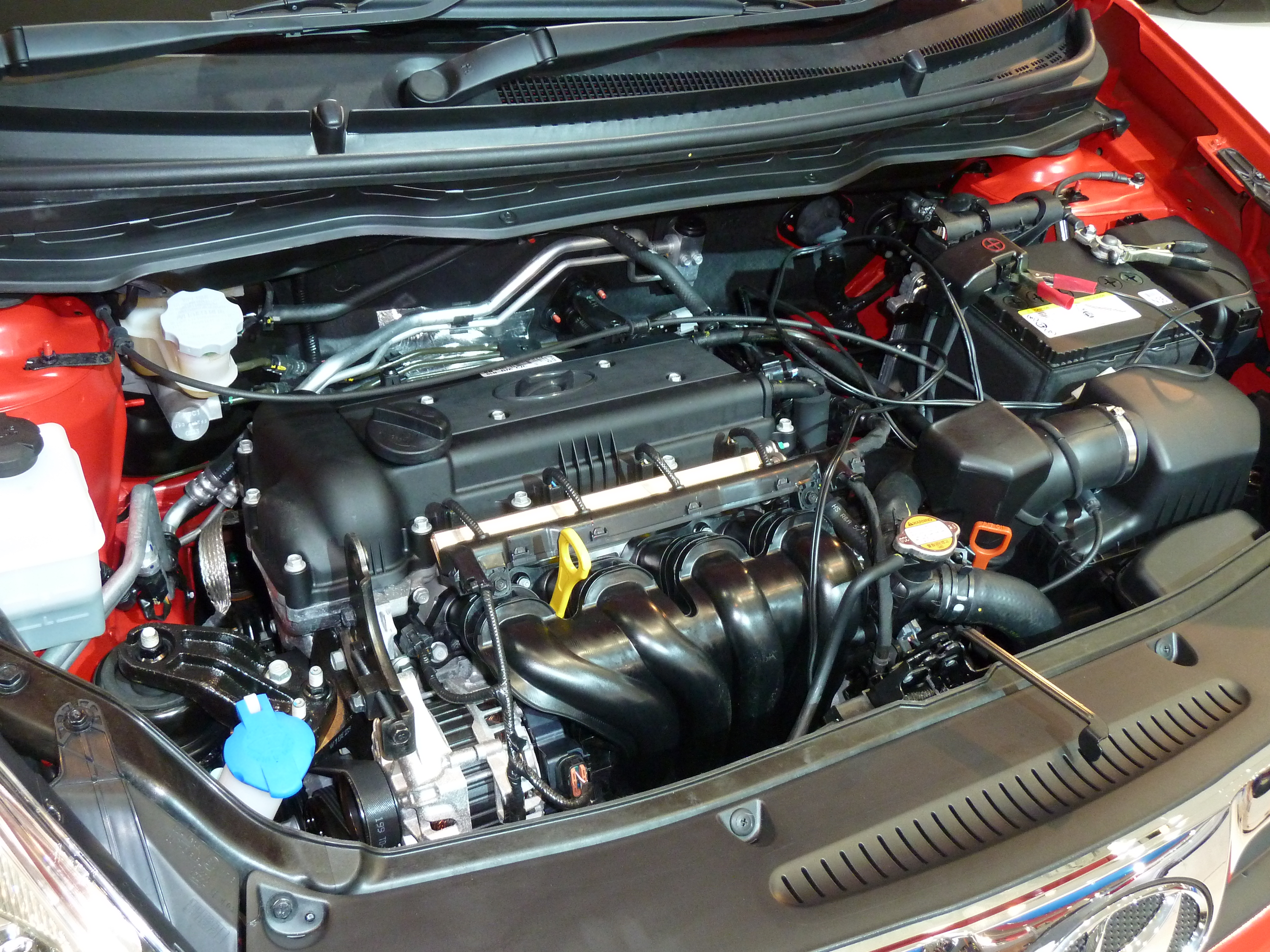

Overview
- Manufacturer: Hyundai Motor Company
- Production: 2006–present

Layout
- Configuration: Straight-4
- Displacement: 1.4 L (1,396 cc); 1.6 L (1,591 cc)
- Cylinder bore: 77 mm (3.03 in)
- Piston stroke: 75 mm (2.95 in); 85.4 mm (3.36 in)
- Cylinder block material: Aluminium
- Cylinder head material: Aluminium
- Valvetrain: DOHC 4 valves x cyl. with CVVT
- Compression ratio: 9.5:1, 10.0:1, 10.5:1, 11.0:1, 13.0:1

RPM range
- Idle speed: 660~750 rpm

Combustion
- Turbocharger: Twin-scroll with intercooler (1.6 T-GDI)
- Fuel system: Gasoline direct injection Multi-point fuel injection
- Fuel type: Unleaded gasoline
- Oil system: Pressure feed
- Cooling system: Water-cooled

Output
- Power output: 100–204 PS (74–150 kW; 99–201 hp)
- Torque output: 13.8–27 kg⋅m (135–265 N⋅m; 100–195 lbf⋅ft)

Dimensions
- Length: 483 mm (19.0 in) (MPi); 603.1 mm (23.74 in) (GDi/T-GDi/FFV)
- Width: 613 mm (24.1 in) (MPi); 695 mm (27.4 in) (GDi/FFV); 754.5 mm (29.70 in) (T-GDi)
- Height: 621 mm (24.4 in) (MPi); 638 mm (25.1 in) (GDi/FFV); 641.5 mm (25.26 in) (T-GDi)
- Dry weight: 101.7–102.1 kg (224–225 lb) (MPi); 106.1 kg (234 lb) (GDi); 130.4 kg (287 lb) (T-GDi); 100.5 kg (222 lb) (FFV)

Chronology
- Predecessor: Alpha
- Successor: Smartstream G1.6/G1.6T

The Hyundai Gamma engine was introduced in 2006 to replace the existing Hyundai Alpha engine. There are 1.4 L and 1.6 L versions of this engine.

Being a development from the Alpha II engine, significant changes include the aluminum construction of the block and cylinder head, resulting in a 15 kg weight reduction to just under 100 kg, and the use of a timing chain instead of belt. It is also the first offset crankshaft engine developed by Hyundai.

Production takes place in Shandong, (China, by Hyundai WIA), Žilina (Slovakia), Hwaseong (South Korea) and Irungattukottai (India).

== Gamma I ==
=== 1.4 MPi (G4FA) ===
The G4FA is a 1.4 L (1,396 cc) engine. Bore and stroke is 77 mm × 75 mm (3.03 in × 2.95 in). It has MPI and makes 111 PS (82 kW; 109 hp) at 6,300 rpm and 14 kg⋅m (137 N⋅m; 101 lbf⋅ft) of torque at 4,200 rpm. Power is dropped to 100 PS (74 kW; 99 hp) at 5,500 rpm and 13.9 kg⋅m (136 N⋅m; 101 lbf⋅ft) of torque at 4,200 rpm in the Hyundai i20. The engine features double overhead cams with 4 valves per cylinder and a chain driven camshaft with continuously variable valve timing system CVVT on intake camshaft only. It is replaced by the 1.4 L Kappa (G4LC) engine.

Applications

- Hyundai Accent/Verna/Solaris (RB/RC) (2011–2017)
- Hyundai i20 (PB) (2008–2014)
- Hyundai ix20 (JC) (2010–2019)
- Hyundai i30 (FD) (2007–2012)
- Kia Cee'd (ED) (2006–2012)
- Kia Cee'd (JD) (2012–2018)
- Kia Rio/K2 (QB and UB) (2011–2017)
- Kia Venga (YN) (2009–2019)

=== 1.6 MPi (G4FC) ===
The Gamma 1.6 MPI version features the same 77mm bore as the 1.4 (G4FA) but an increased 85.4mm stroke and makes 124 PS (91 kW; 122 hp) at 6,000 rpm and 15.9 kg⋅m (156 N⋅m; 115 lbf⋅ft) of torque at 4,200 rpm. In 2010, the G4FC was replaced by the G4FG engine.

Applications

- Hyundai Accent/Verna/Solaris (RB/RC) (2011–2017)
- Hyundai Celesta (ID) (2017–2023)
- Hyundai Elantra (2006–2020)
- Hyundai Veloster (FS) (2011–2018)
- Hyundai HB20 (HB) (2012–2019)
- Hyundai i20 (PB) (2008–2011)
- Hyundai i30 (FD) (2007–2012)
- Hyundai ix20 (OJ) (2010–2019)
- Kia Cee'd (ED) (2006–2012)
- Kia Forte/Cerato (TD) (2008–2012)
- Kia KX3 (KC) (2015–2019)
- Kia Rio/K2 (QB) (2011–2017)
- Kia Soul (AM) (2008–2011)
- Kia Venga (YN) (2009–2019)

=== 1.6 FLEX (F4FA/F4FC) ===
Flex fuel version of the Gamma 1.6 MPi. Bore and stroke are 77mm × 85.4mm and the engine makes 130 PS (96 kW; 130 hp) at 6,000 rpm and 16.5 kg⋅m (162 N⋅m; 119 lbf⋅ft) of torque at 5,000 rpm.

Applications

- Hyundai HB20 (HB) (2012–2019)
- Hyundai HB20 (BR2) (2019–2022)
- Hyundai Creta (GC) (2017–present)
- Hyundai i30 (GD) (2011–2016)

=== 1.6 LPI (L4FA/L4FC) ===
It is a hybrid variant with liquefied petroleum gas engine and electric motor and has higher compression ratio, taking advantage of higher octane rating of the fuel.

In this configuration the engine runs in Atkinson cycle (leaving intake open longer for more complete burn but less displacement).

Applications

- Hyundai Avante (2010–present)
- Hyundai Avante LPI hybrid (2009–2013)
- Kia Forte (2009–2013)

== Gamma II ==
=== 1.6 MPi (G4FG) ===
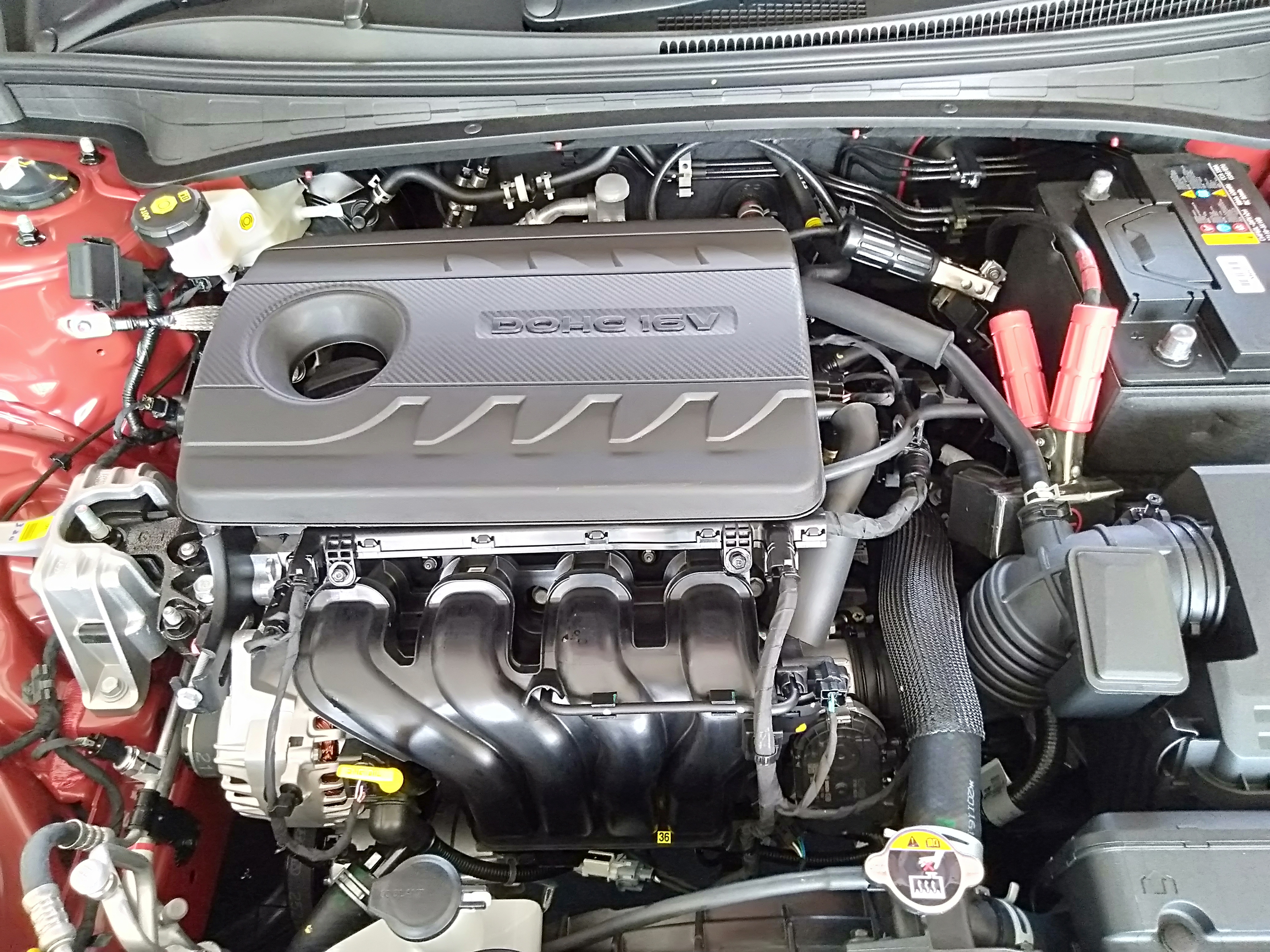
2021 Hyundai Elantra 1.6 MPi engine

Released in 2010, the Gamma II MPI version with dual CVVT (continuous variable valve timing) is a 1,591 cc (97.1 cu in) engine that makes 123–134 PS (90–99 kW; 121–132 hp) at 6,000–6,300 rpm with 15.4–16 kg⋅m (151–157 N⋅m; 111–116 lbf⋅ft) of torque at 4,500–4,850 rpm.

Applications

- Hyundai Accent/Verna (RB/RC) (2011–2017)
- Hyundai Accent/Verna/Solaris (HC/YC) (2017–2023)
- Hyundai Creta/ix25 (GS/GC) (2014–2020)
- Hyundai Creta (SU2r) (2021–present)
- Hyundai Elantra (MD/UD) (2010–2015)
- Hyundai Elantra (AD) (2015–2020)
- Hyundai Elantra (CN7) (2020–present)
- Hyundai HB20 (HB) (2012–2019)
- Hyundai HB20 (BR2) (2019–present)
- Hyundai i30 (GD) (2011–2017)
- Hyundai i30 (PD) (2016–present)
- Hyundai Venue (QX) (2019–present)
- Kia Cee'd (JD) (2012–2018)
- Kia Ceed (CD) (2018–present)
- Kia Cerato (BD) (2018–present)
- Kia Forte/Cerato (YD) (2012–2018)
- Kia KX3 (KC) (2015–2019)
- Kia Rio (YB) (2017–2023)
- Kia Rio/K2 (FB) (2017–2022)
- Kia Seltos (SP2/SP2i) (2019–present)
- Kia Soul (AM) (2011–2014)
- Kia Soul (PS) (2013–2019)
- Kia Soul (SK3) (2019–present)

=== 1.6 FLEX (F4FG) ===
Flex fuel version of the Gamma II 1.6 MPi. Bore and stroke are 77mm × 85.4mm for a total displacement of 1,591 cc (97.1 cu in). The engine makes 130 PS (96 kW; 128 hp) at 6,300 rpm and 16.5 kg⋅m (162 N⋅m; 119 lbf⋅ft) of torque at 5,000 rpm.

Applications

- Hyundai HB20 (BR) (2012-2019)
- Hyundai Creta (GC) (2017–present)
- Hyundai HB20 (BR2) (2019-2022)

=== 1.6 GDi (G4FD) ===
The 1.6 Gamma GDi engine is a gasoline direct injection engine, with Dual-Continuous Variable Valve Timing (D-CVVT). Power output to 140 PS (103 kW; 138 hp) at 6,300 rpm and 17 kg⋅m (167 N⋅m; 123 lbf⋅ft) at 4,850 rpm. It was introduced in 2010 in the Hyundai ix35 and Kia Sportage.

Applications

- Hyundai Accent/Verna/Solaris (RB/RC) (2011–2017)
- Hyundai Accent (HC) (2017–2022)
- Hyundai Elantra (MD) (2010–2015)
- Hyundai i30 (GD) (2011–2016)
- Hyundai i40 (2011–2019)
- Hyundai Tucson (LM) (2009–2015)
- Hyundai Tucson (TL) (2015–2020)
- Hyundai Veloster (FS) (2011–2018)
- Kia Carens (RP) (2013–2019)
- Kia Cee'd (JD) (2012–2018)
- Kia K3/Forte (YD) (2012–2018)
- Kia Rio (UB) (2012–2016)
- Kia Rio (YB) (2017–2019, detuned 130hp)
- Kia Soul (AM) (2012-2014)
- Kia Soul (PS) (2013-2019)
- Kia Sportage (SL) (2010–2015)
- Kia Sportage (QL) (2015–2021)

=== 1.6 T-GDI (G4FJ) ===
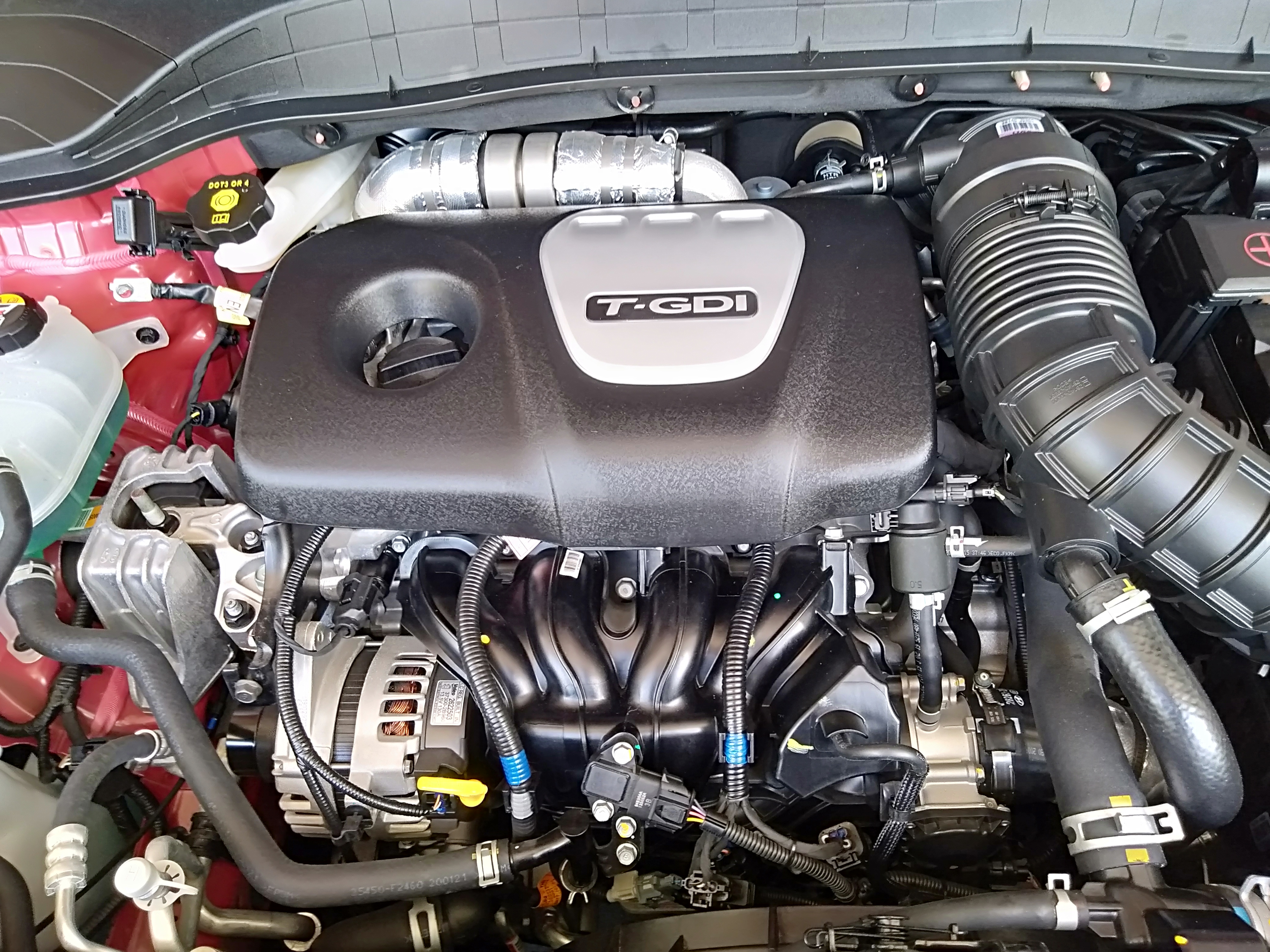
2021 Hyundai Kona 1.6 T-GDi engine

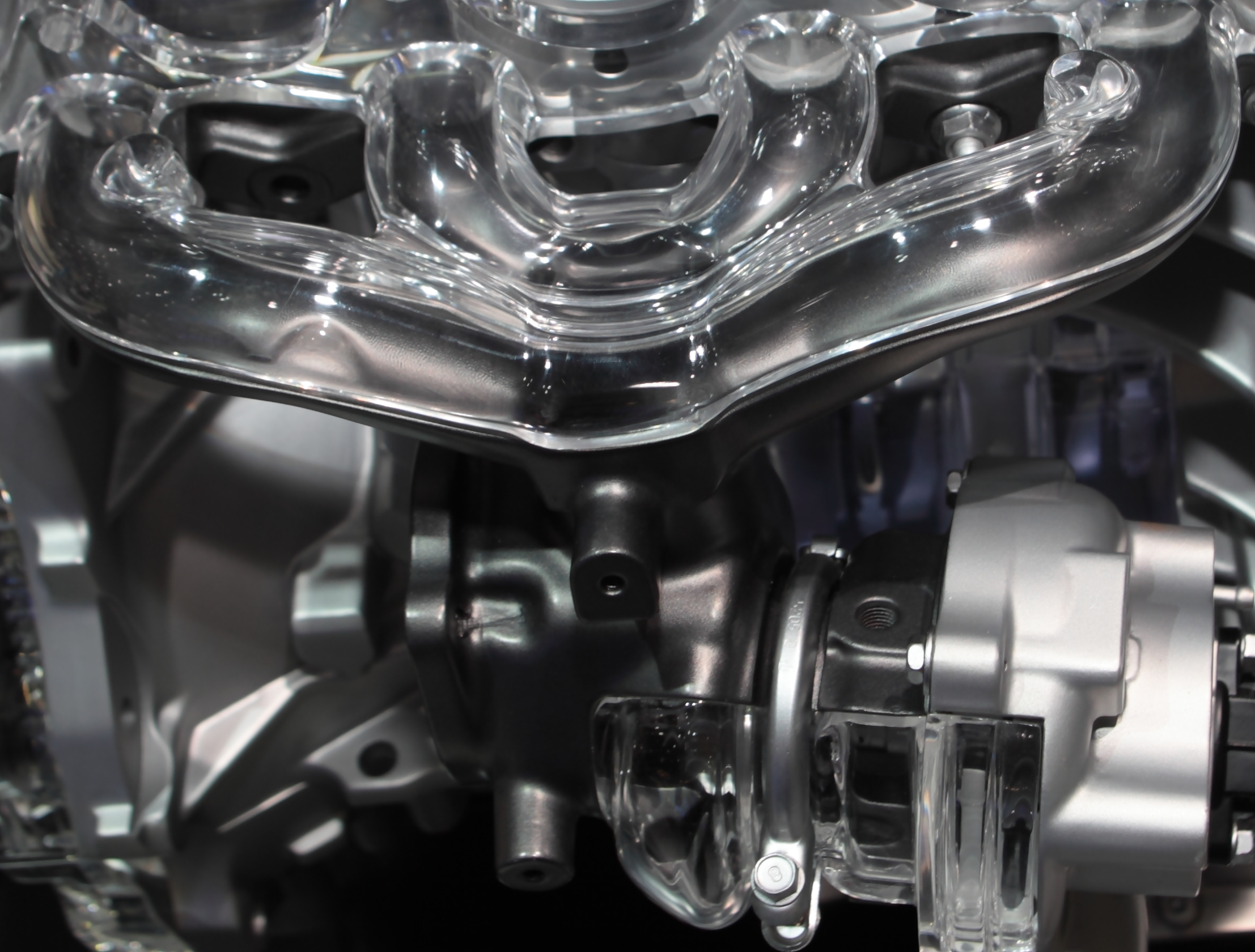
Exhaust and twin-scroll turbocharger of the T-GDI version

Announced in 2011, it is a version of 1.6 Gamma GDi with twin-scroll turbocharger, air guided intercooler, direct fuel injection system and dual CVVT. It produces 204 PS (150 kW; 201 hp) at 6,000 rpm with 27 kg⋅m (265 N⋅m; 195 lbf⋅ft) of torque at 1,500–4,500 rpm. A detuned version is available with 177 PS (130 kW; 175 hp) at 5,500 rpm.

The engine was unveiled in the 11th Hyundai-Kia International Powertrain Conference.

The engine has been revised in the 2nd Generation Veloster Turbo to include a new pressurized cooling system, higher compression ratio of 10:1, electronically actuated wastegate, and a new ECU (CPEGD2.20.3).

Its improved version equipped with Continuously Variable Valve Duration (CVVD) was released in 2019 as the Smartstream G1.6T (G4FP) engine.

Applications

- Hyundai Accent/Verna (RB/RC) (2011–2017)
- Hyundai Elantra (AD) (2017–2020)
- Hyundai i30 (GD) (2015–2016)
- Hyundai i30 (PD) (2016–present)
- Hyundai Kona (OS) (2017–2020, detuned)
- Hyundai Lafesta (2018–2022)
- Hyundai Mistra (CF) (2017–2020)
- Hyundai Sonata (LF) (2014–2019, detuned)
- Hyundai Tucson (TL) (2015-2020, detuned)
- Hyundai Veloster (FS) (2012–2018)
- Hyundai Veloster (JS) (2018–2020)
- Kia Cee'd (JD) (2012–2018)
- Kia Ceed (CD) (2018–present)
- Kia Forte/K3 (2012–2024)
- Kia K4 (2014–2021)
- Kia KX3 (KC) (2015–2019)
- Kia Optima/K5 (JF) (2015–2019)
- Kia Seltos (SP2) (2019–2022, detuned)
- Kia Soul (SK3) (2019–present)
- Kia Sportage (QL) (2015–2021)

Motorsports

- Hyundai i20 Coupe WRC
- Hyundai i20 R5
- Hyundai i20 WRC

== Engines ==
Petrol engines
Model	Eng. code	Power	Torque	Comp.	Weight
1.4 Gamma MPi	G4FA	111 PS (82 kW; 109 hp) at 6300 rpm	14 kg⋅m (137 N⋅m; 101 lbf⋅ft) at 5000 rpm	10.5:1	68 kg (150 lb)
1.6 Gamma GDi	G4FD	140 PS (103 kW; 138 hp) at 6300 rpm	17 kg⋅m (167 N⋅m; 123 lbf⋅ft) at 4850 rpm	11.0:1	68 kg (150 lb)
1.6 Gamma MPi	G4FC	130 PS (96 kW; 128 hp) at 6000 rpm	16 kg⋅m (157 N⋅m; 116 lbf⋅ft) at 4850 rpm	10.5:1	68 kg (150 lb)
1.6 Gamma MPi	G4FG	132 PS (97 kW; 130 hp) at 6300 rpm	16 kg⋅m (157 N⋅m; 116 lbf⋅ft) at 4850 rpm	10.5:1	68 kg (150 lb)
1.6 Gamma T-GDI	G4FJ	177 PS (130 kW; 175 hp) at 5500 rpm	27 kg⋅m (265 N⋅m; 195 lbf⋅ft) at 1500-4500 rpm	9.5:1	70.5 kg (155 lb)
1.6 Gamma T-GDI	G4FJ	204 PS (150 kW; 201 hp) at 6000 rpm	27 kg⋅m (265 N⋅m; 195 lbf⋅ft) at 1750-4500 rpm	9.5:1	70.5 kg (155 lb)
1.6 Gamma T-GDI	G4FJ	204 PS (150 kW; 201 hp) at 6000 rpm	27 kg⋅m (265 N⋅m; 195 lbf⋅ft) at 1500-4500 rpm	10.0:1	70.5 kg (155 lb)

Liquefied Petroleum Gas engines
Model	Eng. code	Displ.	Bore × Stroke	Power	Torque	Comp.
1.6 Gamma LPI	L4FA	1.6 L (1,591 cc)	77 mm × 85.4 mm (3.03 in × 3.36 in)	105 PS (77 kW; 104 hp) at 5700 rpm	15.1 kg⋅m (148 N⋅m; 109 lbf⋅ft) at 4000 rpm	13.0:1
1.6 Gamma LPI	L4FA	electric motor	—N/a	44 PS (32 kW; 43 hp) at 1850-2500 rpm	17.3 kg⋅m (170 N⋅m; 125 lbf⋅ft) at 0-1800 rpm	—N/a
1.6 Gamma LPI	L4FA	combined	—N/a	138 PS (101 kW; 136 hp) at 5700 rpm	27 kg⋅m (265 N⋅m; 195 lbf⋅ft) at 4000 rpm	13.0:1

== See also ==
- List of Hyundai engines
