= Hyundai Venue =

Subcompact crossover SUV

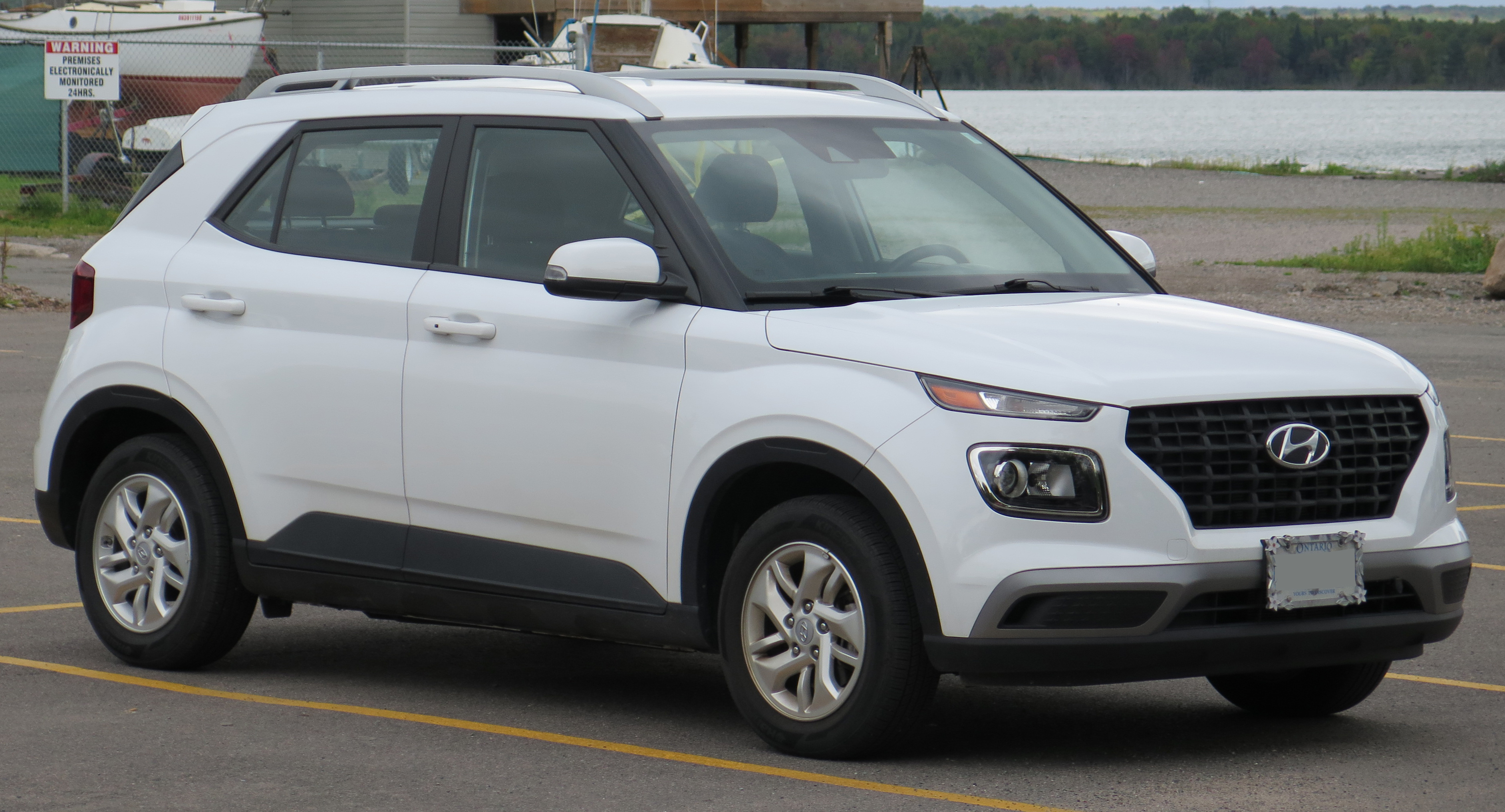
- 2022 Hyundai Venue Preferred (Canada)

Overview
- Manufacturer: Hyundai
- Production: 2019–present
- Model years: 2020–present

Body and chassis
- Class: Subcompact crossover SUV
- Body style: 5-door SUV
- Layout: Front-engine, front-wheel-drive

The Hyundai Venue (Korean: 현대 베뉴) is a subcompact crossover SUV manufactured by South Korean manufacturer Hyundai since 2019. Introduced in 2019, it was positioned below the Kona as Hyundai's smallest crossover at the time.

The Venue is not marketed in Europe, except Ukraine in favour of the European-focused Hyundai Bayon, which was introduced in 2021.

The first-generation model remains on sale in markets including Australia and the United States, while the second-generation model was launched in India on 4 November 2025 and went on sale in Chile in July 2026.

== First generation (QX; 2019) ==
First generation
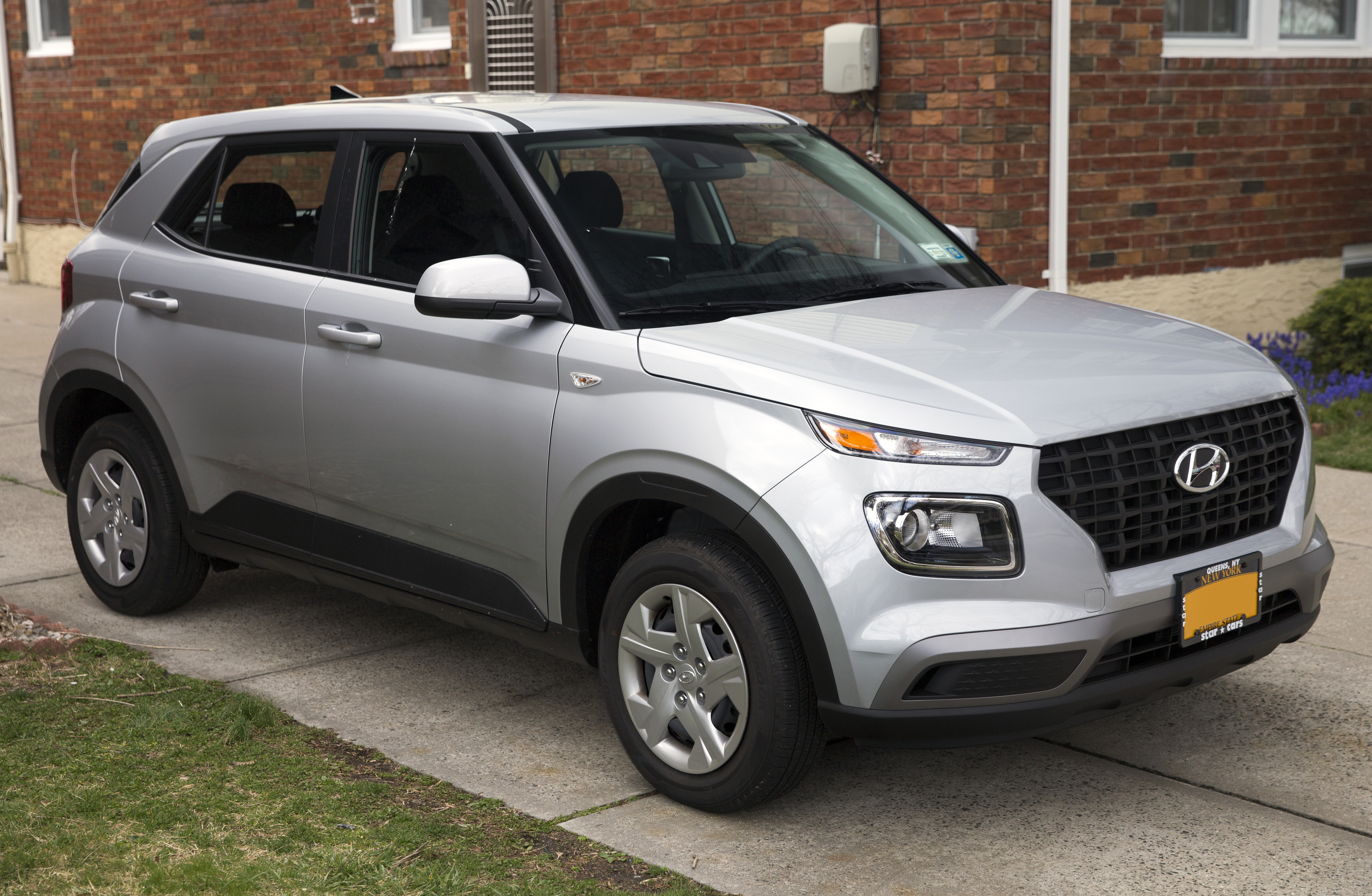
- 2020 Hyundai Venue SE (US)

Overview
- Model code: QX
- Production: May 2019 – present
- Model years: 2020–present
- Assembly: South Korea: Ulsan (Ulsan Plant 3); India: Chennai (HMIL); Vietnam: Ninh Bình (HTMV); Taiwan: Hukou, Hsinchu (SYM); Nepal: Ramgram, Parasi (Laxmi Motor)
- Designer: Chan-Hee Lee, Duck-Hyun Hwang and Goo Lee

Body and chassis
- Platform: Hyundai-Kia K2
- Related: Hyundai Accent (HC); Kia Sonet

Powertrain
- Engine: Petrol: 1.0 L Kappa II T-GDi I3; 1.2 L Kappa II I4; 1.6 L Gamma II I4; 1.6 L Smartstream I4; 1.6 L Smartstream DPi I4; Diesel: 1.4 L U II CRDi I4; 1.5 L U II CRDi I4
- Transmission: 5/6-speed manual; 6-speed semi-automatic; 6-speed automatic; 7-speed DCT; CVT

Dimensions
- Wheelbase: 2,520 mm (99.2 in) (QX); 2,500 mm (98.4 in) (QXi)
- Length: 4,040 mm (159.1 in) (QX); 3,995 mm (157.3 in) (QXi)
- Width: 1,770 mm (69.7 in)
- Height: 1,565–1,585 mm (61.6–62.4 in) (QX); 1,605 mm (63.2 in) (QXi)
- Curb weight: 1,112–1,251 kg (2,452–2,758 lb) (QX); 1,050 kg (2,310 lb) (QXi)

=== Overview ===
The Venue debuted at the 2019 New York International Auto Show. Two versions of the Venue were developed and produced for different markets: The Korean-made Venue is code-named QX (or QX1), while the Indian-oriented model, code-named QXi, is shorter in length and wheelbase than the Korean version. It shares its platform with the fifth-generation Accent.

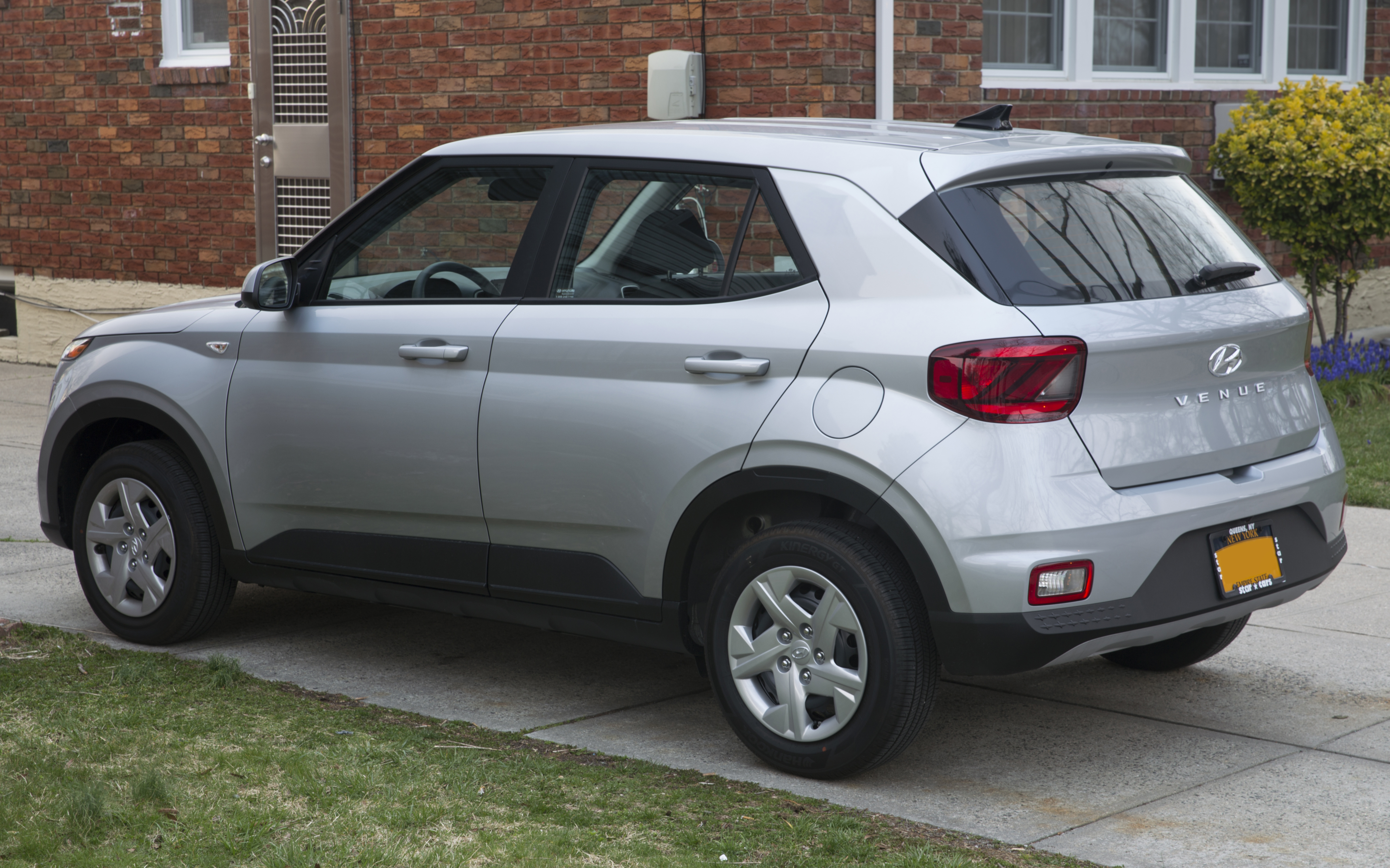
Rear view

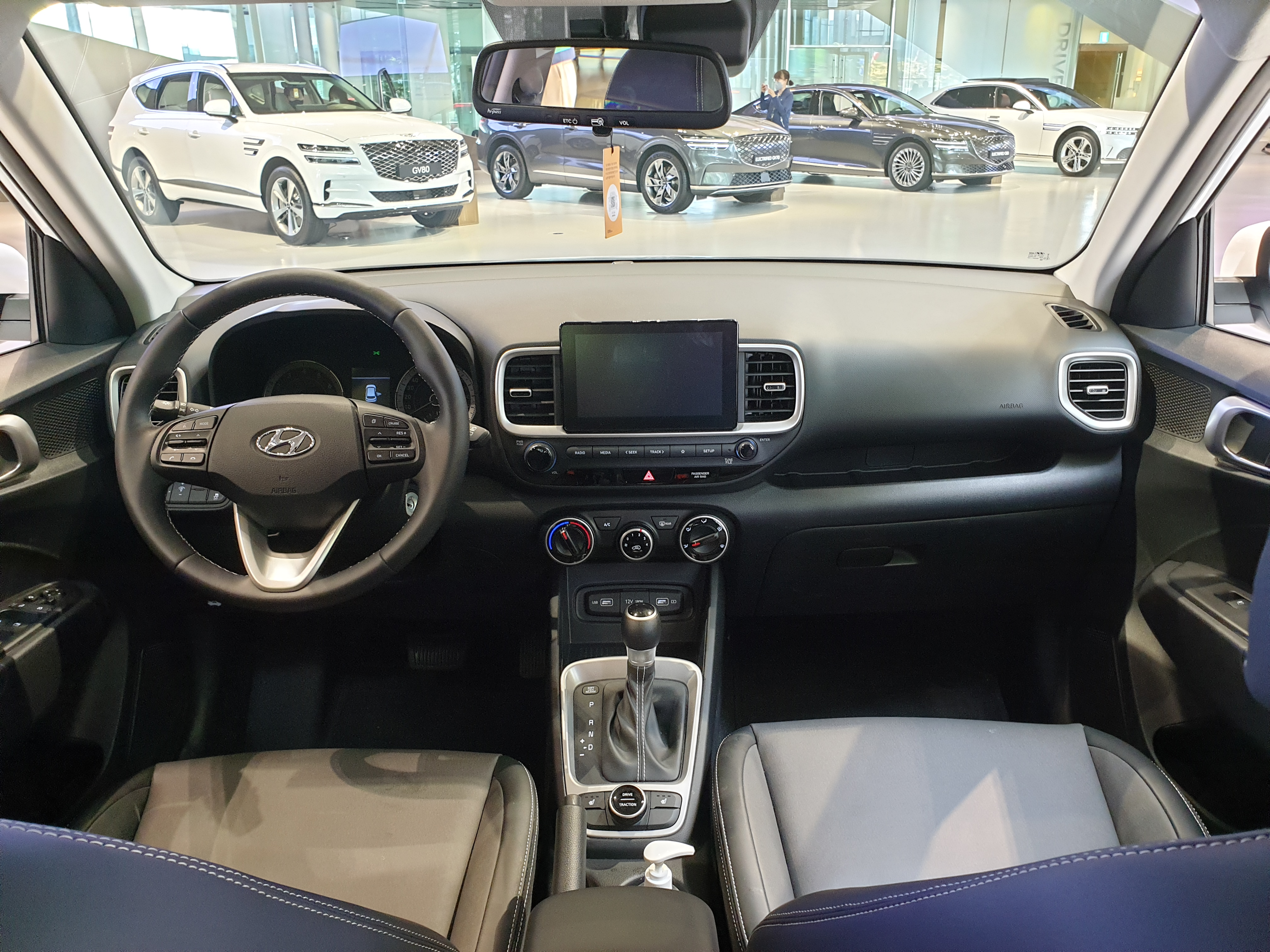
Interior

=== Markets ===
==== Asia ====
===== India (QXi) =====
The Venue was launched in India on 21 May 2019, in India and was initially available in five trim levels: E, S, SX, SX+, and SX(O). As of December 2019, bookings had crossed the 100,000 mark.

In the Indian market, the Venue occupies the sub-4 metre SUV category, benefiting from the Indian tax advantages for cars shorter than 4 metres. The length is reduced by 45 mm (1.8 in) to achieve the sub-4 metre mark by fitting a less protruding rear bumper. The Venue is powered by a 1.2-litre 4-cylinder naturally aspirated petrol engine that produces 83 PS (61 kW; 82 hp) and 115 N⋅m (11.7 kg⋅m; 84.8 lb⋅ft) of torque, paired with a 5-speed manual transmission, and a 1.0-litre 3-cylinder turbocharged GDI petrol engine that offers 120 PS (88 kW; 118 hp) and 172 N⋅m (17.5 kg⋅m; 127 lb⋅ft) of torque. The turbo petrol exclusively gets an option of a 7-speed dual-clutch automatic transmission and a 6-speed manual as well.

The 1.4-litre diesel engine, which the Venue was originally launched with, was replaced by a 1.5-litre Bharat Stage 6-compliant diesel engine in March 2020. The larger engine produces 100 PS (74 kW; 99 hp) and 240 N⋅m (24.5 kg⋅m; 177 lb⋅ft) of torque, which is 10 hp and 20 Nm more than the 1.4-litre engine's output. The 1.5-litre diesel engine is paired with a 6-speed manual transmission.

In July 2020, a 6-speed manual transmission without a clutch option was introduced for the 1.0-litre engine. It is marketed as iMT technology. It functions with an intention sensor on the gear lever, hydraulic actuator, and transmission control unit (TCU). The TCU receives a signal from the lever intention sensor, indicating the driver's intention to change gears, which then sends a signal to engage the hydraulic actuator forming hydraulic pressure. The hydraulic pressure is then sent to the concentric slave cylinder (CSC) through the clutch tube. The CSC uses this pressure to control the clutch and pressure plate, thereby engaging and disengaging the clutch.

In June 2022, Hyundai launched the refreshed version of the Venue in India. It featured a redesigned front and rear fascia, a digital instrument cluster, and an expanded list of equipment. Additionally, the N Line variant was introduced in August 2022. The facelifted Venue is exported to the Middle East since January 2023.

By November 2024, the model reached total sales of 600,000 units in India since its introduction in May 2019.

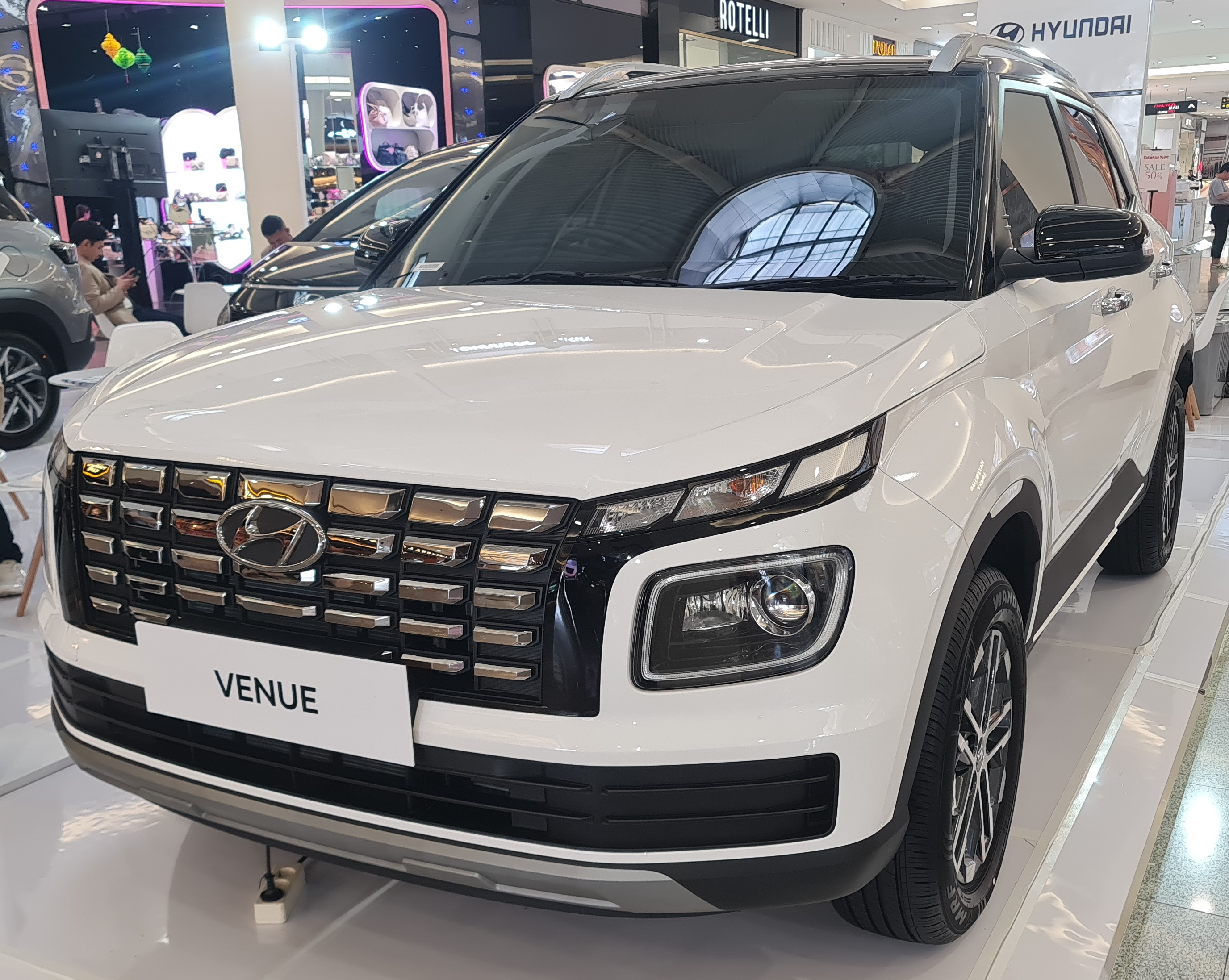
2022 Venue Turbo (India; facelift)

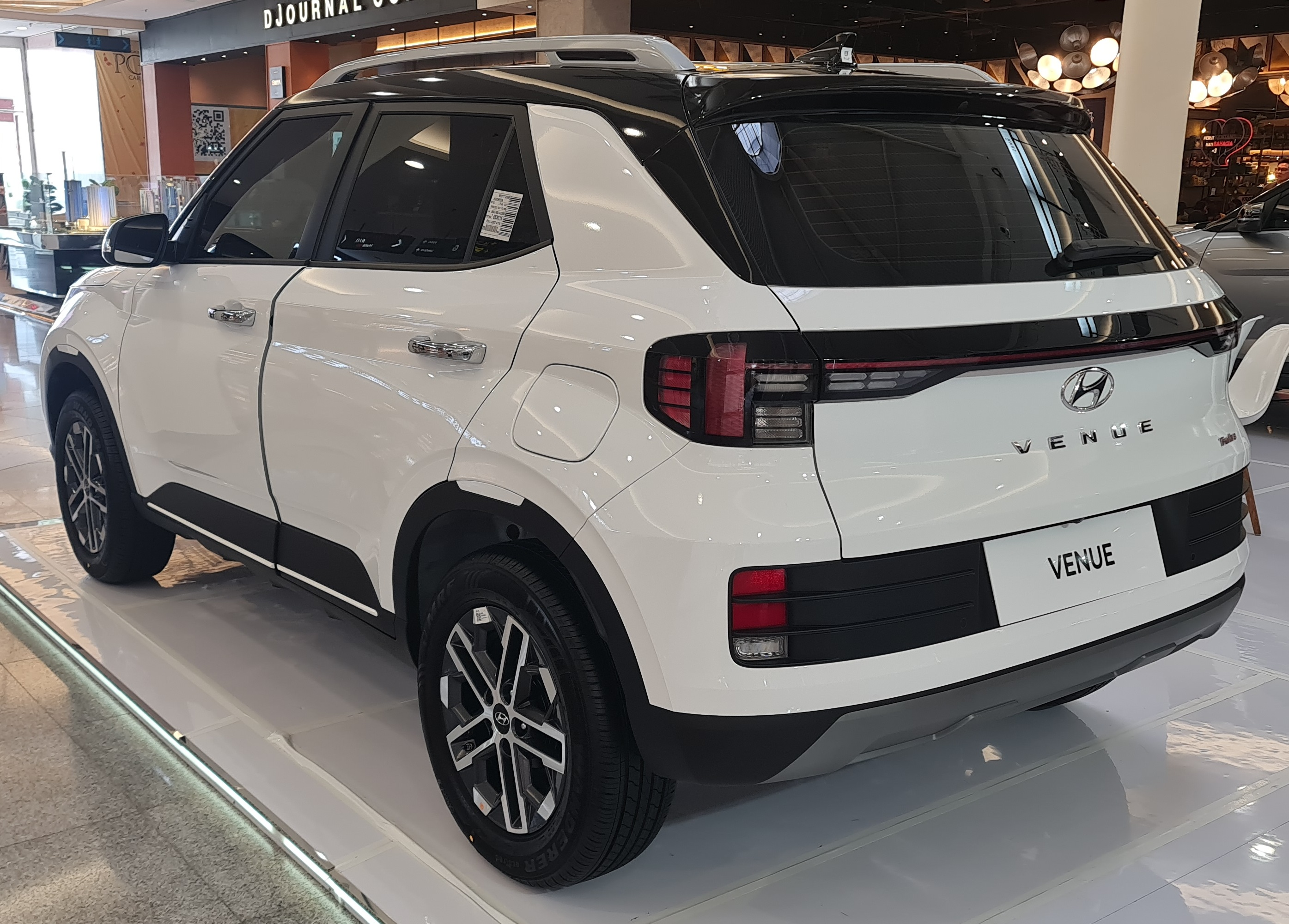
Rear view

===== Indonesia =====
The Venue was launched in Indonesia on 13 February 2025 at the 32nd Indonesia International Motor Show. Imported from India, it is only offered in one trim level with the same engine and transmission as the Vietnamese version.

===== Philippines =====
The Venue was launched in the Philippines on 23 October 2020, with two trim levels: GL and GLS, powered by the 1.6-litre Gamma inline-four petrol engine paired only with a 6-speed automatic. The Venue was reintroduced in the Philippines market on 12 September 2025 after a hiatus off-sale, with the same trim levels and engine option when the model was first introduced to the market.

===== Taiwan =====
The Venue was launched in Taiwan on 10 September 2020, with three variants: GLA, GLB and GLC, all variants are powered by a Smartstream 1.6-litre petrol engine paired to an IVT transmission.

The facelifted Venue was launched in Taiwan on 2 May 2024, with the same variants and engine option from the pre-facelift model.

===== Vietnam =====
The Venue was launched in Vietnam on 16 December 2023. Assembled locally with knock-down kits imported from India, it is available with two variants powered by a 1.0-litre T-GDi turbocharged petrol engine paired to a 7-speed dual-clutch automatic.

==== GCC ====
The Venue was launched in the GCC countries in January 2023. Imported from India, it is powered by the 1.6-litre petrol engine and offered in three trim levels; SEL, SE, and Limited.

==== North America ====
In the North American market, the Venue is powered by the 1.6-litre Smartstream petrol straight-four engine producing 121 hp (123 PS; 90 kW) and 113 lb⋅ft (153 N⋅m) of torque. Both a 6-speed manual transmission (available only on base SE trim) and an Intelligent Variable Transmission (IVT) will be available (the latter is standard on the SEL and Denim, optional on the SE), and the Venue is available exclusively with front-wheel drive (FWD). Trim levels are base SE and up-level SEL. The manual transmission model was discontinued for the year 2021 due to low sales.

There is also a lifestyle version called the Venue Denim, only available in Denim Blue with a White roof combined with a Denim and light grey leatherette interior. The Denim was renamed to the Limited trim after the 2021 model year. The Limited trim was discontinued after the 2025 model year.

South America

In South America, before its facelift, the Hyundai Venue was powered by a 123 hp 1.6L Gamma engine, available with a 6-speed manual or 6-speed automatic transmission. And after its facelift, the Hyundai Venue is now available for reservation with deliveries starting in June (2026). It will be powered by a 118 hp 1.0L turbo engine, paired with either a 6-speed manual or a 7-speed dual-clutch transmission.

==== Oceania ====
===== Australia =====
The Australian-market Venue was launched on 20 September 2019. Imported from South Korea, it comes in three trim levels consisting of Go, Active & Elite, and sit below the dimensionally larger Hyundai Kona. A 'Launch Edition' model based on the Elite was also initially available and limited to 100 units, featuring unique exterior colours and a power sunroof. All are powered by the 1.6-litre Gamma inline-four petrol engine available with either a 6-speed manual transmission or 6-speed automatic transmission depending on the variant. For the Australian market, the Venue acts as an indirect replacement for the fourth-generation Hyundai Accent, due to the lack of right-hand-drive fifth-generation Hyundai Accent production from South Korea. The entry price for the Venue has been kept low in order to maintain future entry-level customers.

===== New Zealand =====
The Venue was launched in New Zealand on 7 December 2019, with two trim levels: Entry and Elite. Imported from South Korea, it is powered by a 1.6-litre Gamma petrol engine paired only with a 6-speed automatic.

==== South Africa ====
The Venue was launched in South Africa on 14 November 2019, with three trim levels: Motion, Fluid and Glide. Imported from India, it is powered by a 1.0-litre T-GDi turbocharged petrol engine paired with either a 6-speed manual or 7-speed dual-clutch automatic.

In July 2020, three Limited Edition variants with only 500 units offered. The Limited Edition variants have a Denim exterior colour with white side mirrors and roof and the interior have a Denim Blue upholstery made of cloth and leather.

In November 2021, the entry-level Motion variant was added powered by a 1.2-litre Kappa II petrol engine paired to a 5-speed manual.

The facelifted Venue debuted in South Africa on 19 October 2022, with the same variants from the pre-facelift model.

==== Egypt ====
On September 16, GB Auto announced the launch of the locally assembled Hyundai Venue; the Korean version of the first-generation model prior to the facelift.

=== Safety ===
In 2021, the IIHS awarded the Hyundai Venue a Top Safety Pick Key award, and the NHTSA rated it at four out of five stars for safety, with one star deducted due to rollover and front risk ratings of four stars. Safety features include six airbags, an electronic stability control system, a vehicle stability management system, a forward collision warning alarm, a pedestrian detection warning alarm, blind-spot detection, and rear cross-traffic assistance. The active lane-keeping assistance, automatically adjustable high beams LED headlights, and blind-spot detection are standard in all SEL trims. The Hyundai Venue has had one recall for seat belt pre-tensioners, with 72,142 units at risk, due to risk of explosion.

IIHS scores
| Small overlap front (Driver) | Good | |
| Small overlap front (Passenger) | Good | |
| Moderate overlap front | Good | |
| Side (original test) | Good | |
| Roof strength | Good | |
| Head restraints and seats | Good | |
| Headlights | Acceptable / Marginal | varies by trim/option |
| Front crash prevention (Vehicle-to-Vehicle) | Superior | optional |
| Front crash prevention (Vehicle-to-Vehicle) | Superior | standard |
| Front crash prevention (Vehicle-to-Pedestrian, day) | Superior | optional |
| Front crash prevention (Vehicle-to-Pedestrian, day) | Advanced | standard |
| Child seat anchors (LATCH) ease of use | Acceptable | |

ANCAP test results* Hyundai Venue (2019, aligned with Euro NCAP)
| Test | Points | % |
|---|---|---|
| Overall: | 5 /5 stars | |
| Adult occupant: | 34.9 | 91% |
| Child occupant: | 40 | 81% |
| Pedestrian: | 29.8 | 62% |
| Safety assist: | 8 | 62% |

=== Powertrain ===
==== QX models ====
| Model | Year | Transmission | Power | Torque | 0–100 km/h (0-62 mph) (official) |
Petrol
| 1.6 L Gamma MPi | 2019–present | 6-speed manual 6-speed automatic | 123 PS (90 kW; 121 hp) at 6,300 rpm | 15.4 kg⋅m (151 N⋅m; 111 lbf⋅ft) at 4,850 rpm | 11.2 s (manual); 11.4 s (automatic) |
| 1.6 L Smartstream MPi | 2019–present | 6-speed manual CVT | 123 PS (90 kW; 121 hp) at 6,300 rpm | 15.7 kg⋅m (154 N⋅m; 114 lbf⋅ft) at 4,500 rpm | 11.2 s |
| 1.6 L Smartstream DPi | 2019–present | CVT | 123 PS (90 kW; 121 hp) at 6,300 rpm | 15.6 kg⋅m (153 N⋅m; 113 lbf⋅ft) at 4,500 rpm | 11.2 s |

==== QXi models ====
| Model | Year | Transmission | Power | Torque |
Petrol
| 1.0 L Kappa II T-GDi | 2019–present | 6-speed manual 6-speed semi-automatic 7-speed DCT | 120 PS (88 kW; 118 hp) at 6,000 rpm | 17.5 kg⋅m (172 N⋅m; 127 lbf⋅ft) at 1,500–4,000 rpm |
| 1.2 L Kappa II MPi | 2019–present | 5-speed manual | 83 PS (61 kW; 82 hp) at 6,000 rpm | 11.7 kg⋅m (115 N⋅m; 85 lbf⋅ft) at 4,000 rpm |
Diesel
| 1.4 L U II CRDi | 2019–2020 | 6-speed manual | 90 PS (66 kW; 89 hp) at 4,000 rpm | 23.5 kg⋅m (230 N⋅m; 170 lbf⋅ft) at 1,500–2,750 rpm |
| 1.5 L U II CRDi | 2020–present | 6-speed manual | 100 PS (74 kW; 99 hp) at 4,000 rpm | 24.5 kg⋅m (240 N⋅m; 177 lbf⋅ft) at 1,500–2,750 rpm |

== Second generation (QU2; 2025) ==
Second generation
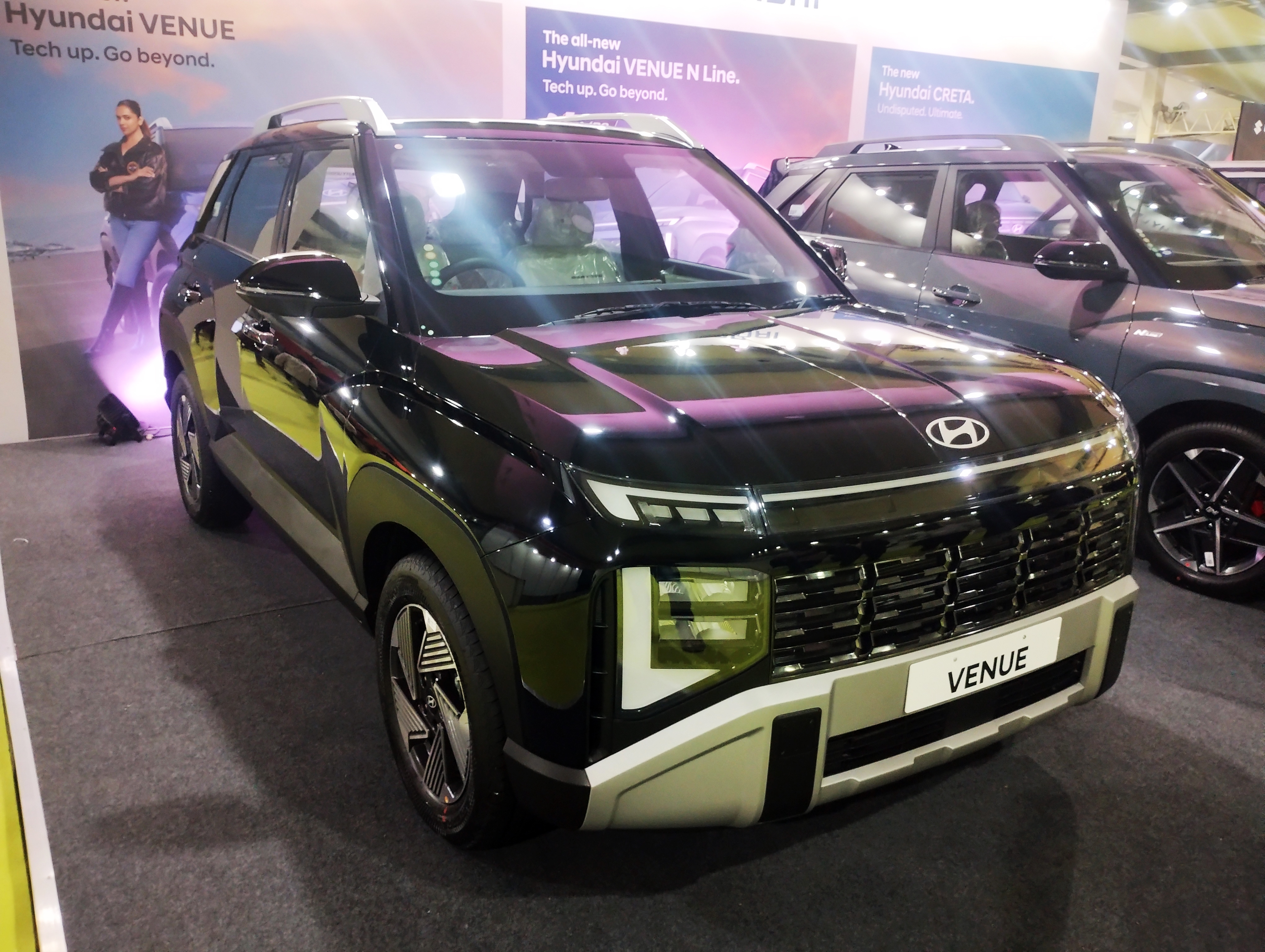

Overview
- Model code: QU2i
- Production: November 2025 – present
- Assembly: India: Talegaon (HMIL)
- Designer: Park Cho-hee

Body and chassis
- Platform: Hyundai-Kia K1 platform
- Related: Kia Syros

Powertrain
- Engine: Petrol: 1.0 L Kappa II turbo GDi I3; 1.2 L Kappa II I4; Diesel: 1.5 L U II CRDi I4
- Transmission: 5-speed manual 6-speed manual 6-speed automatic 7-speed DCT

Dimensions
- Wheelbase: 2,520 mm (99.2 in)
- Length: 3,995 mm (157.3 in)
- Width: 1,800 mm (70.9 in)
- Height: 1,665 mm (65.6 in)
- Curb weight: 1,112–1,251 kg (2,452–2,758 lb)

The second-generation Venue was launched in India on 4 November 2025, six years after the introduction of the first-generation model.

=== Exterior ===
At the front, it features a wide rectangular grille, quad-beam LED headlamps and a full-width LED daytime running light bar. The side and rear feature wheel-arch cladding, redesigned 16-inch alloy wheels and a full-width LED taillight.

The model measures 3,995 mm in length and has a wheelbase of 2,520 mm.

=== Interior ===
The interior features dual 12.3-inch curved displays combining the digital instrument cluster and infotainment system. Available equipment includes rear air-conditioning vents and an eight-speaker Bose audio system. Two-step reclining rear seats, rear window sunshades and dual-tone leatherette upholstery are also available.

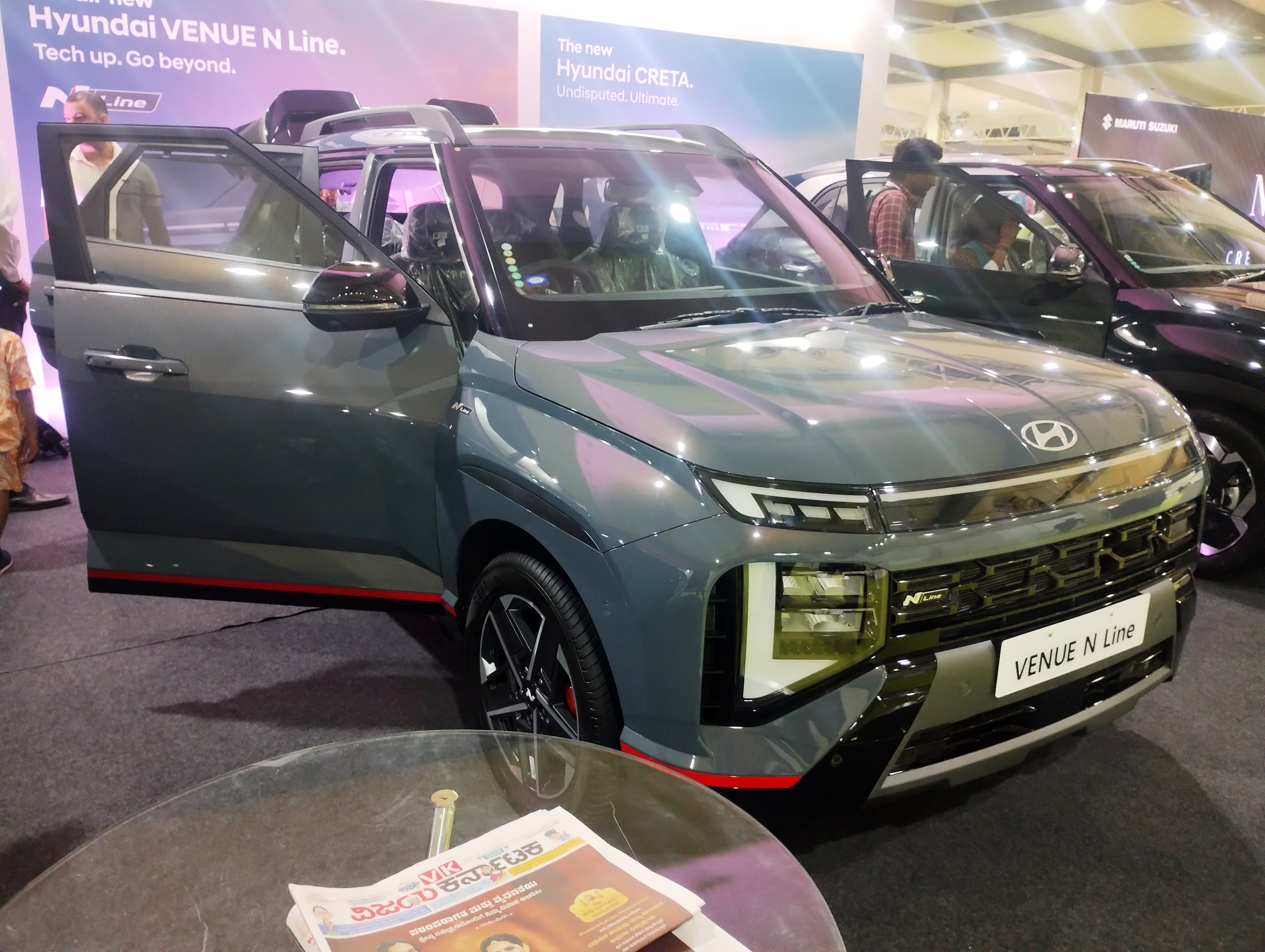
2026 Hyundai Venue N-Line

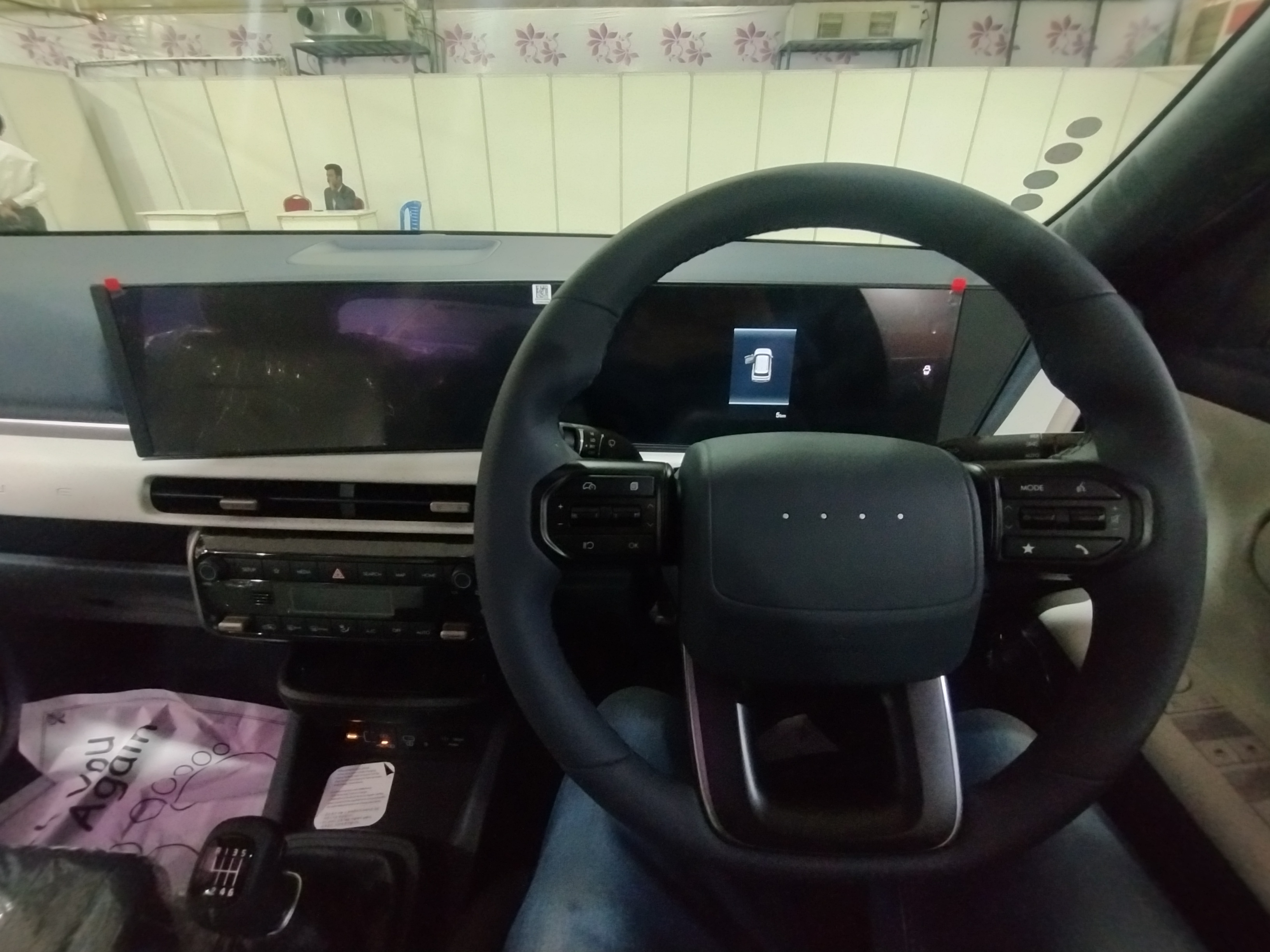
Interior

=== Platform ===
Unlike its predecessor, the second-generation Venue uses the "reinforced" K1 platform, shared with a variety of other small Hyundais and Kias, including the Syros.

==== Powertrain ====
In terms of engines, it offers a choice of petrol or diesel, and is the second model from the K1 platform family to be fitted with a 1.5-litre diesel engine after the Kia Syros.

The petrol engines are 1.2-litre Kappa II petrol and 1.0-litre Kappa II T-GDi turbocharged petrol, and the diesel engine is a 1.5-litre turbocharged diesel.

All engines are paired to either a 5MT, 6MT, 6AT or a 7DCT transmission.

=== Markets ===
==== India ====
Pre-orders for the second-generation Venue (QU2i) opened in October 2025. IIn India, the standard Venue range is offered in HX2, HX4, HX5, HX5+, HX6, HX6T, HX7, HX8 and HX10 trims, with Knight editions available on selected HX trims. The Venue N Line is marketed separately in N6 and N10 trims.

A new HX5+ variant was added on 2 January 2026. It is slotted between the HX5 and HX6 variants. It is only available with the 1.2-litre Kappa II petrol engine, with the 5-speed manual transmission.

==== Mexico ====
The second-generation Venue was launched in Mexico on 22 September 2026, with two trim levels: GL (M/T) and Limited (DCT), it is powered by the 1.0-litre T-GDi turbocharged petrol engine.

==== South Africa ====
The second-generation Venue was launched in South Africa on 28 October 2026, with two trim levels: Premium and N Line. For powertrains, it is available with either a 1.2-litre petrol paired with a 5-speed manual and the 1.0-litre T-GDi turbocharged petrol paired with a 7-speed DCT.

==== Chile ====
The second-generation Venue went on sale in Chile in July 2026, coinciding with Hyundai's 40th anniversary in the country. Imported from India, it is offered in four variants across three trim levels: Go with a six-speed manual transmission, Plus with either a six-speed manual or seven-speed dual-clutch transmission, and Design with a seven-speed dual-clutch transmission. All variants use a 1.0-litre turbocharged petrol engine.

=== Safety ===
Bharat NCAP test results Hyundai Venue (2026, based on Latin NCAP 2016)
| Test | Score | Stars |
|---|---|---|
| Adult occupant protection | 31.15/32.00 | 5 /5 stars |
| Child occupant protection | 44.46/49.00 | 5 /5 stars |

== Sales ==
=== Global sales ===
| Year | Venue QX | Indian-built (Venue QXi/QU2) (Note: The second-generation Venue (QU2i) was launched in India on 4 November 2025. Hyundai's model-wise sales data for 2025 do not distinguish between the outgoing QXi and the second-generation QU2i; the Indian-built Venue figure is therefore shown as a combined total.) | Total (Note: Global figures are manufacturer-reported wholesale shipments compiled by calendar year. Figures for the Korean-built QX are reported by Hyundai Motor Company, while figures for the Indian-built QXi and QU2i are reported by Hyundai Motor India.) |
|---|---|---|---|
| 2019 | 37,454 | 74,324 | 111,778 |
| 2020 | 56,305 | 88,531 | 144,836 |
| 2021 | 70,015 | 115,705 | 185,720 |
| 2022 | 67,998 | 128,382 | 196,380 |
| 2023 | 74,345 | 142,652 | 216,997 |
| 2024 | 61,891 | 126,972 | 188,863 |
| 2025 | 82,153 | 122,042 | 204,195 |

=== Regional sales (Note: Global figures are manufacturer-reported wholesale shipments compiled by calendar year. Figures for the Korean-built QX are reported by Hyundai Motor Company, while figures for the Indian-built QXi and QU2i are reported by Hyundai Motor India.) ===
| Year | India | South Korea | United States | Canada | South Africa | Australia | Taiwan |
|---|---|---|---|---|---|---|---|
| 2019 | 70,443 | 16,867 | 1,077 | | | | |
| 2020 | 82,428 | 17,726 | 19,125 | | 4,482 | 3,678 | 1,982 |
| 2021 | 108,007 | 13,496 | 28,653 | | 6,293 | 5,854 | 5,324 |
| 2022 | 120,703 | 8,425 | 27,094 | 11,944 | 7,212 | 6,440 | 4,528 |
| 2023 | 129,278 | 8,281 | 28,009 | 13,592 | 5,156 | 6,152 | 3,898 |
| 2024 | 117,819 | 4,645 | 24,607 | 11,323 | | 6,949 | |
| 2025 | 115,355 | 12,165 | 29,805 | 14,629 | 2,753 | 7,927 | |

== See also ==
- List of Hyundai vehicles
- List of Hyundai engines
- List of Hyundai transmissions
