= Hyundai R engine =

R engine

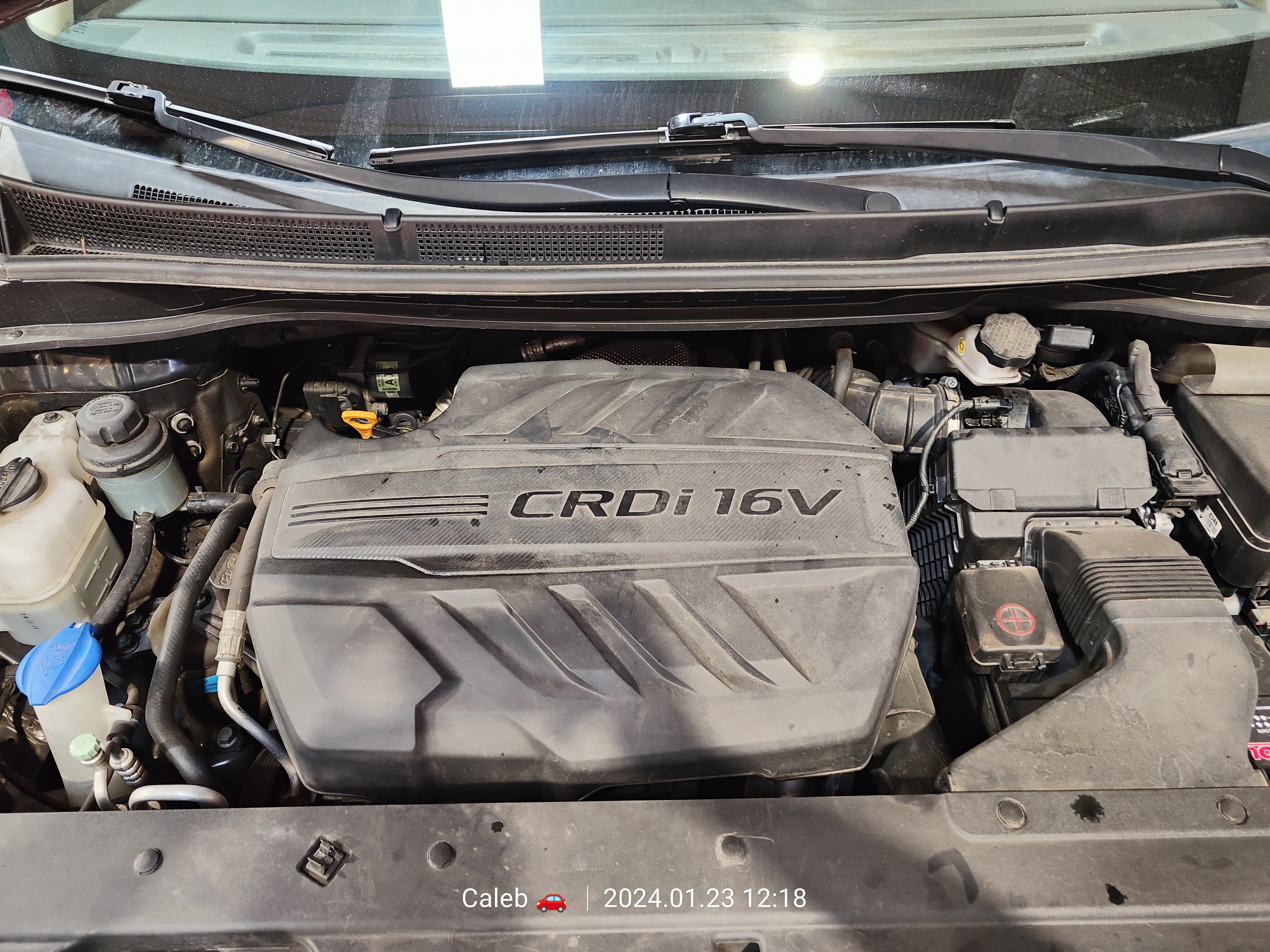
- Kia Carnival 2.0L Diesel

Overview
- Manufacturer: Hyundai Motor Group
- Production: 2009–present

Layout
- Configuration: Inline-4
- Displacement: 2.0 L (1,995 cc); 2.2 L (2,199 cc)
- Cylinder bore: 84 mm (3.31 in); 85.4 mm (3.36 in)
- Piston stroke: 90 mm (3.54 in); 96 mm (3.78 in)
- Cylinder block material: Compacted graphite iron
- Cylinder head material: Aluminum
- Valvetrain: DOHC, 4 valves per cylinder

Combustion
- Turbocharger: Variable geometry
- Fuel system: Common rail direct injection
- Management: Bosch with air system-based charge control
- Fuel type: Diesel oil
- Cooling system: Water-cooled

Output
- Power output: 177–202 PS (130–149 kW; 175–199 hp)
- Torque output: 40–45 kg⋅m (392–441 N⋅m; 289–325 lbf⋅ft)

Emissions
- Emissions target standard: Euro 5; Euro 6

Chronology
- Predecessor: Hyundai D engine
- Successor: Smartstream D2.0/D2.2

The Hyundai R engine is a diesel 4-cylinder automobile engine produced by Hyundai Motor Group, it was announced during the Advanced Diesel Engine Technology Symposium in November 2008 and began production in 2009.

The R line of engines feature four cylinders compacted graphite iron block and aluminum cylinder head unit, with chain driven dual overhead camshafts operating four valves per cylinder. Fuel is supplied to the unit using Bosch 3rd-generation common rail direct injection (CRDi) through piezoelectric Bosch injectors operating at 1,800 bar (26,000 psi), with air being fed through an electronically managed variable geometry turbocharger and an advanced engine control unit (air system-based charge control).

For reduced vibration and lower booming noise, the R gets a lower balancer shaft which is encased in a stiffened ladder frame housing for increased rigidity. Weight saving features include a serpentine belt with isolation pulley, a plastic head cover, plastic intake manifold and plastic oil filter housing.

To achieve Euro 5 emission compliancy, the R is fitted with a close-coupled Diesel particulate filter plus highly efficient exhaust gas recirculation with by-pass valve.

== 2.0 L (D4HA) ==
The D4HA bore and stroke are 84 mm × 90 mm (3.31 in × 3.54 in) for a total displacement of 2.0 L (1,995 cc). It generates 184–186 PS (135–137 kW; 181–183 hp) of power at 4,000 rpm and 40–41 kg⋅m (392–402 N⋅m; 289–297 lbf⋅ft) of torque between 1,750 and 2,750 rpm.

=== Applications ===
- Hyundai Santa Fe (2009–2020)
- Hyundai Tucson/ix35 (2009–2020)
- Kia Sorento (2009–2020)
- Kia Sportage (2010–2021)

== 2.2 L (D4HB) ==
Bore and stroke are 85.4 mm × 96 mm (3.36 in × 3.78 in) for a total displacement of 2.2 L (2,199 cc).

The D4HB generates 193–200 PS (142–147 kW; 190–197 hp) of power at 3,800 rpm and 44.5–45 kg⋅m (436–441 N⋅m; 322–325 lbf⋅ft) of torque between 1,750 and 2,750 rpm. A detuned version that makes 177 PS (130 kW; 175 hp) of power at 3,800 rpm and 44.5 kg⋅m (436 N⋅m; 322 lbf⋅ft) of torque between 1,500 and 2,500 rpm is also available.

=== Applications ===
- Kia K7 (2017–2021)
- Hyundai Grandeur (2011–2019)
- Hyundai Palisade (LX2) (2018–present)
- Hyundai Santa Fe (2009–2020)
- Hyundai Staria (2021–present; detuned)
- Kia Carnival (2010–2020)
- Kia Sorento (2009–2020)

== 2.2 L FR (D4HC) ==
Bore and stroke are 85.4 mm × 96 mm (3.36 in × 3.78 in) for a total displacement of 2.2 L (2,199 cc).

For RWD based applications, the D4HC generates 202 PS (149 kW; 199 hp) of power and 45 kg⋅m (441 N⋅m; 325 lbf⋅ft) of torque between 1,750 and 2,750 rpm.

=== Applications ===
- Genesis G70 (2017–present)
- Genesis G80 (DH) (2016–2020)
- Kia Stinger (2017–2020)

== See also ==
- List of Hyundai engines
