= Hyundai D engine =

D engine

Overview
- Manufacturer: Hyundai Motor Company
- Production: 2001–2010

Layout
- Configuration: Inline-3; Inline-4
- Displacement: 1.5 L (1,493 cc); 2.0 L (1,991 cc); 2.2 L (2,188 cc)
- Cylinder bore: 83 mm (3.27 in); 87 mm (3.43 in)
- Piston stroke: 92 mm (3.62 in)
- Cylinder block material: Cast iron
- Cylinder head material: Aluminum
- Valvetrain: SOHC 4 valves x cyl.
- Compression ratio: 17.3:1–17.7:1

RPM range
- Idle speed: 750 rpm

Combustion
- Turbocharger: Variable geometry
- Fuel system: Common rail direct injection
- Management: Bosch
- Fuel type: Diesel
- Cooling system: Water-cooled

Output
- Power output: 82–157 PS (60–115 kW; 81–155 hp)
- Torque output: 18.6–35 kg⋅m (182–343 N⋅m; 135–253 lbf⋅ft)

Emissions
- Emissions target standard: Euro 3; Euro 4

Chronology
- Successor: Hyundai U engine (1.5 L); Hyundai R engine (2.0/2.2 L)

The Hyundai D engine is a family of 3-cylinder and 4-cylinder diesel engines produced by Hyundai Motor Company under license from VM Motori.

The D-line of engines feature cast iron block and aluminum cylinder head, with belt driven single overhead camshafts operating four valves per cylinder. Fuel is supplied to the unit using Bosch common rail direct injection (CRDi) operating at 1,350 bar (19,600 psi), the fuel rate was increased to 1,600 bar (23,000 psi) for the second generation D engines.

The D-Line of engines initially targeted Euro 3 emission compliancy with newer iterations being compliant with Euro 4 emission standard.

== 1.5 L (D3EA) ==
The D3EA bore and stroke are 83 mm × 92 mm (3.27 in × 3.62 in) for a total displacement of 1.5 L (1,493 cc) and a compression ratio of 17.7:1. It generates 82–90 PS (60–66 kW; 81–89 hp) of power at 4,000 rpm and 18.6 kg⋅m (182 N⋅m; 135 lbf⋅ft) of torque between 1,900 and 2,700 rpm.

=== Applications ===
- Hyundai Accent (LC) (2002–2005)
- Hyundai Getz (2002–2005)
- Hyundai Matrix (2001–2005)

== 2.0 L (D4EA) ==
The D4EA bore and stroke are 83 mm × 92 mm (3.27 in × 3.62 in) for a total displacement of 2.0 L (1,991 cc) and a compression ratio of 17.7:1. It generates 111–152 PS (82–112 kW; 109–150 hp) of power at 4,000 rpm and 25–31.1 kg⋅m (245–305 N⋅m; 181–225 lbf⋅ft) of torque between 1,800 and 2,500 rpm.

=== Applications ===
- Hyundai Elantra (XD) (2000–2006)
- Hyundai i30 (FD) (2007–2010)
- Hyundai Santa Fe (2000–2009)
- Hyundai Sonata (NF) (2004–2009)
- Hyundai Tucson (JM) (2004–2009)
- Hyundai Trajet (2002–2006)
- Kia Carens (2002–2009)
- Kia Ceed (ED) (2007–2010)
- Kia Cerato (LD) (2004–2006)
- Kia Magentis (MG) (2006–2010)
- Kia Sportage (JE) (2004–2010)

== 2.2 L (D4EB) ==
The D4EB bore and stroke are 87 mm × 92 mm (3.43 in × 3.62 in) for a total displacement of 2.2 L (2,188 cc). It generates 152–157 PS (112–115 kW; 150–155 hp) of power and 34–35 kg⋅m (333–343 N⋅m; 246–253 lbf⋅ft) of torque between 1,800 and 2,500 rpm.

=== Applications ===
- Hyundai Grandeur (TG) (2007–2010)
- Hyundai Santa Fe (CM) (2005–2009)

== See also ==
- List of Hyundai engines
