= Hyundai U engine =

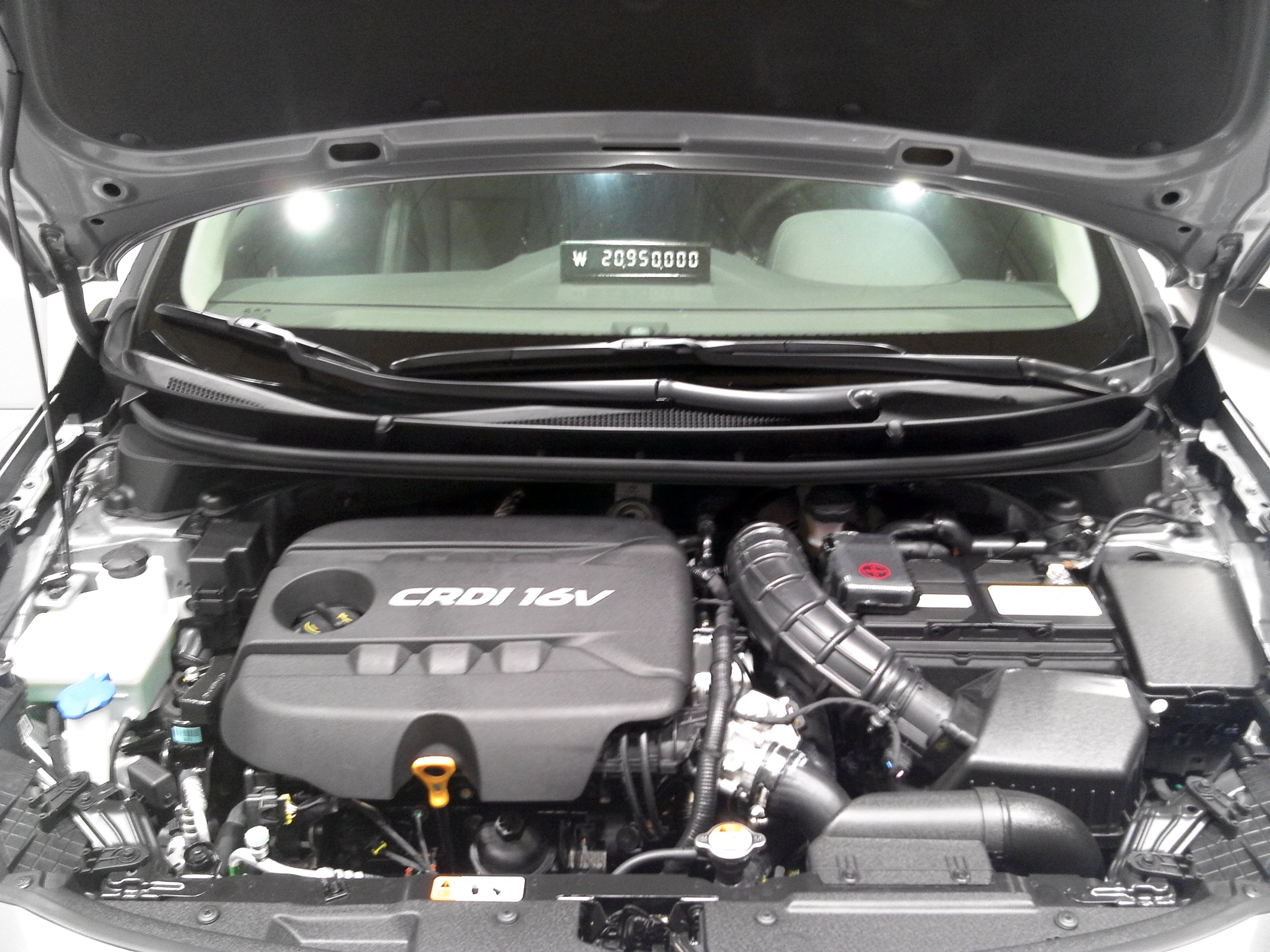

Overview
- Manufacturer: Hyundai Motor Group
- Production: 2004–present

Layout
- Configuration: Straight-3 or Straight-4
- Displacement: 1.1 L (1,120 cc); 1.2 L (1,186 cc); 1.4 L (1,396 cc); 1.5 L (1,493 cc); 1.6 L (1,582 cc); 1.7 L (1,685 cc)
- Cylinder bore: 75 mm (2.95 in); 77.0 mm (3.03 in); 77.2 mm (3.04 in)
- Piston stroke: 79 mm (3.11 in); 84.5 mm (3.33 in); 85.8 mm (3.38 in); 90 mm (3.54 in)
- Cylinder block material: Cast iron
- Cylinder head material: Aluminum
- Valvetrain: DOHC 4 valves x cyl.
- Compression ratio: 17.0:1, 17.3:1

Combustion
- Turbocharger: Fixed or variable geometry
- Fuel system: Common rail direct injection
- Management: Delphi or Bosch
- Fuel type: Diesel
- Cooling system: Water-cooled

Output
- Power output: 71–141 PS (52–104 kW; 70–139 hp)
- Torque output: 15.6–34.7 kg⋅m (153–340 N⋅m; 113–251 lbf⋅ft)

Chronology
- Predecessor: Hyundai D engine
- Successor: Smartstream D1.5/D1.6

The Hyundai U engine is a series of three or four-cylinder diesel engines made for automotive applications by the Hyundai Kia Automotive Group. The U series of engines includes the smallest automotive diesel engines produced by Hyundai.

== 1.1 L (D3FA) ==
The 1.1 L (1,120 cc) U diesel engine is a 3-cylinder version of the 1.5L U series unit and is made with cast iron block and aluminum cylinder head with chain driven DOHC with 4 valves per cylinder, Delphi common rail direct injection (CRDi), variable geometry turbocharger (VGT) and intake air swirl control. Bore and Stroke are 75 mm × 84.5 mm (2.95 in × 3.33 in). It creates 71–75 PS (52–55 kW; 70–74 hp) at 4,000 rpm and 15.6–18.3 kg⋅m (153–179 N⋅m; 113–132 lbf⋅ft) of torque between 1,750 and 2,500 rpm.

It is one of Hyundai's most efficient engines with a fuel consumption of 4.2 L/100 km (67 mpg_{‑imp}; 56 mpg_{‑US}), and emits 112 g/km of CO_{2}. The engine also incorporates a 1½ engine order balance shaft mounted under the crankshaft driven by helical gears to manage engine vibration.

Applications

- Hyundai i10 (2007–2019)
- Hyundai i20 (2008–2020)
- Kia Picanto (SA) (2006–2011)
- Kia Rio (UB) (2011–2017)

== 1.2 L (D3FB) ==
The 1.2 L (1,186 cc) U diesel engine utilizes three cylinders and is made with cast iron block and aluminum cylinder head with chain driven DOHC with 4 valves per cylinder. It produces 75 PS (55 kW; 74 hp) at 4,000 rpm and 19.4 kg⋅m (190 N⋅m; 140 lbf⋅ft) of torque between 1,750 and 2,250 rpm.

Applications

- Hyundai Aura (2020–present)
- Hyundai i10 (2017–present)

== 1.4 L (D4FC) ==
The 1.4 L (1,396 cc) U diesel engine utilizes four cylinders and is made with cast iron block and aluminum cylinder head with chain driven DOHC with 4 valves per cylinder, Bosch common rail direct injection (CRDi), fixed geometry turbocharger (FGT) and intake air swirl control. It is a reduced stroke version of the 1.5L U series with Bore and Stroke at 75 mm × 79 mm (2.95 in × 3.11 in).

It produces 90 PS (66 kW; 89 hp) at 4,000 rpm and 22.4–24.5 kg⋅m (220–240 N⋅m; 162–177 lbf⋅ft) of torque between 1,500 and 2,500 rpm.

Applications

- Hyundai Verna (RB/RC) (2011–2017)
- Hyundai Verna (HCi) (2020–2023)
- Hyundai Creta (GS) (2015–2020)
- Hyundai i20 (2008–2020)
- Hyundai i30 (GD) (2011–2017)
- Hyundai ix20 (JC) (2010–2019)
- Hyundai Venue (QXi) (2019–2020)
- Kia Cee'd (JD) (2012–2018)
- Kia Rio (UB) (2011–2017)
- Kia Rio (YB) (2017–2023)

== 1.5 L (D4FA) ==
The 1.5 L (1,493 cc) U diesel engine has four cylinders and is made with a cast iron block, aluminum cylinder head with chain driven DOHC (4 valves per cylinder), Bosch common rail direct injection (CRDi), variable geometry turbocharger (VGT) and intake air swirl control. Bore and stroke are 75 mm × 84.5 mm (2.95 in × 3.33 in). It produces 89 hp (66 kW; 90 PS) and 159 lb⋅ft (216 N⋅m) torque in the Hyundai Getz and 108 hp (81 kW; 109 PS) at 4,000 rpm and 174 lb⋅ft (236 N⋅m) of torque at 2,000 rpm in the Kia Rio and higher spec Hyundai Getz models. Introduced in 2005 this engine replaced the 1.5L 3-cylinder D-engine common rail Diesel sold in the Hyundai Getz and Accent models which was notably less refined.

Applications

- Kia Rio (JB) (2005–2011)
- Kia Seltos (2019–present)
- Kia Carens (2022–present)
- Hyundai Accent (MC) (2005–2010)
- Hyundai Getz (2006–2010)
- Hyundai Lavita (2006–2010)
- Hyundai Alcazar (2021–present)
- Hyundai Creta (SU2i) (2020–present)
- Hyundai i20 (BI3) (2020–present)
- Hyundai Venue (QXi) (2020–present)
- Hyundai Verna (HCi) (2020–present)

== 1.6 L (D4FB) ==
The 1.6 L (1,582 cc) U diesel engine (known as D4FB) from the Žilina Kia factory in Slovakia is a bored-out version of the 1.5 litres (1,493 cc) U series engine, 77.2 mm (3.04 in) versus 75 mm (2.95 in). In 2009, it was refined to the 1.6 U2 version, with a new displacement, developing 126 hp (94 kW; 128 PS) and 195 lb⋅ft (264 N⋅m) of torque.

Engine specification

- Displacement: 1.6 L (1,582 cc)
- Bore x Stroke: 77.2 mm × 84.5 mm (3.04 in × 3.33 in)
- Compression Ratio: 17.3:1
- Power: 90 PS (66 kW; 89 hp), 115 PS (85 kW; 113 hp) or 128 PS (94 kW; 126 hp)
- Torque: 24 kg⋅m (235 N⋅m; 174 lbf⋅ft), 26 kg⋅m (255 N⋅m; 188 lbf⋅ft) or 27 kg⋅m (265 N⋅m; 195 lbf⋅ft)

Applications

- Hyundai Accent (2010–2020)
- Hyundai Creta (GS) (2014–2020)
- Hyundai Elantra (MD) (2013–2015)
- Hyundai Elantra (AD) (2015–2020)
- Hyundai Kona (OS) (2017–2020)
- Hyundai i30 (2007–2019)
- Hyundai ix20 (JC) (2010–2019)
- Kia Carens (UN) (2006–2013)
- Kia Cee'd/Ceed (2006–2018)
- Kia Forte/Cerato (2008–2018)
- Kia Seltos (2019–present)
- Kia Soul (2008–2019)
- Kia Stonic (2017–2018)
- Kia Venga (YN) (2009–2019)

== 1.7 L (D4FD) ==
The 1.7 litres (1,685 cc) U2 diesel engine (known as D4FD) was introduced at the 2010 Paris Motor Show. This engine features chain driven DOHC with 4 valves per cylinder, common rail direct injection (CRDi), variable geometry turbocharger (VGT).

1.7 CRDI

- Displacement: 1.7 L (1,685 cc)
- Bore x Stroke: 77.2 mm × 90 mm (3.04 in × 3.54 in)
- Compression Ratio: 17.0:1
- Power: 115 PS (85 kW; 113 hp) or 141 PS (104 kW; 139 hp) @ 4,000 rpm
- Torque: 26.5 kg⋅m (260 N⋅m; 192 lbf⋅ft) or 34.7 kg⋅m (340 N⋅m; 251 lbf⋅ft) @ 2,000–2,500 rpm

Applications

- Hyundai i40 (2011–2019)
- Hyundai Sonata (LF) (2014–2019)
- Hyundai Tucson/ix35 (2010–2018)
- Kia Carens (RP) (2013–2019)
- Kia Optima (2010–2018)
- Kia Sportage (2010–2018)

== See also ==
- List of Hyundai engines
