= Hyundai ix20 =

Mini MPV

Hyundai ix20 (JC)
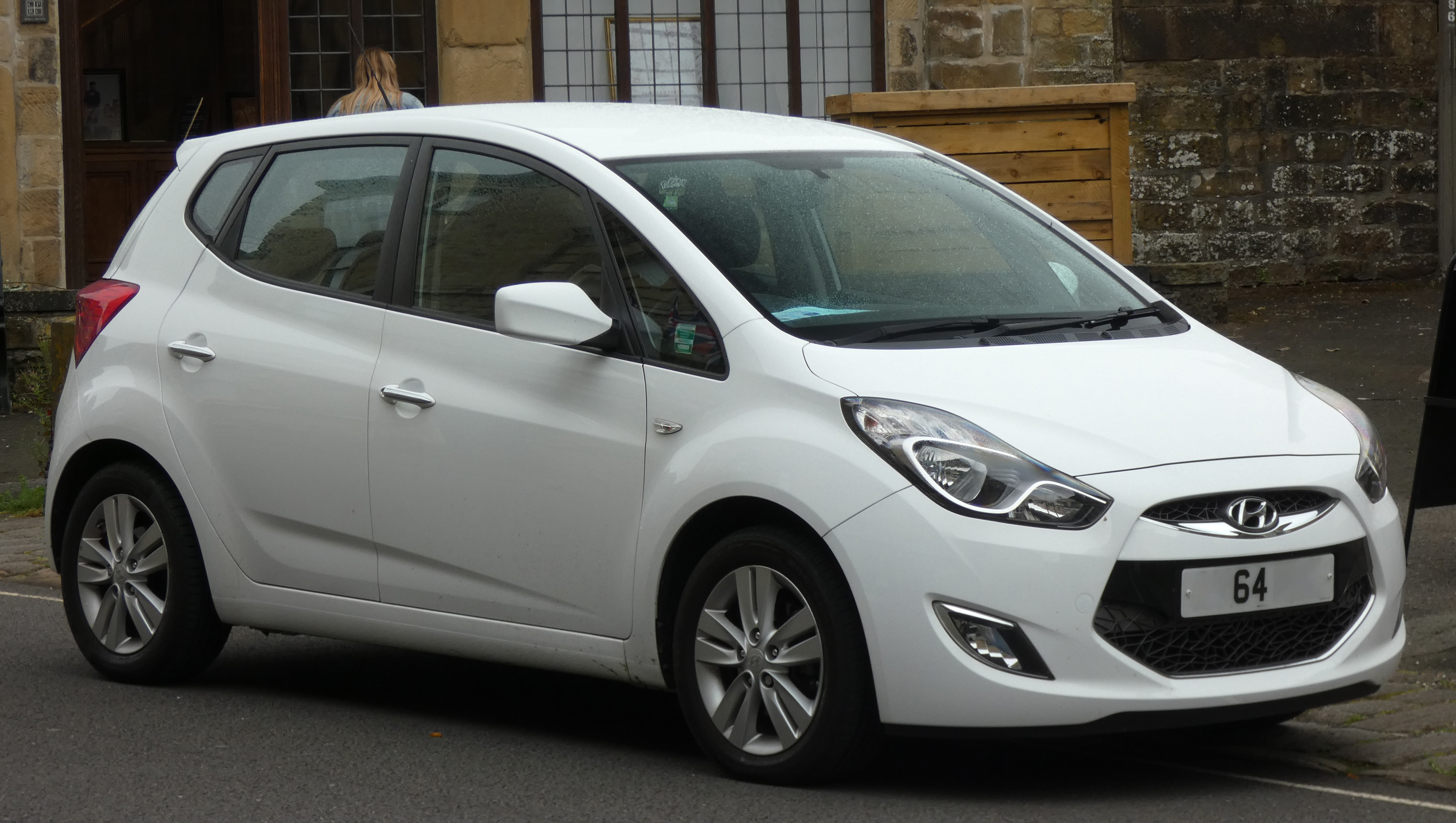

Overview
- Manufacturer: Hyundai
- Production: September 2010 – May 2019
- Assembly: Czech Republic: Nošovice (HMMC)
- Designer: Thomas Bürkle

Body and chassis
- Class: Mini MPV
- Body style: 5-door hatchback
- Layout: Front-engine, front-wheel-drive
- Platform: Hyundai-Kia PB
- Related: Kia Venga; Hyundai i20 (PB); Kia Rio (UB); Kia Soul (AM)

Powertrain
- Engine: Petrol: 1.4 L Gamma CVVT I4; 1.6 L Gamma CVVT I4; Diesel: 1.4 L U CRDi-VGT I4 (turbo diesel); 1.6 L U CRDi-VGT I4 (turbo)
- Transmission: 5-speed manual; 6-speed manual; 4-speed automatic

Dimensions
- Wheelbase: 2,615 mm (103.0 in)
- Length: 4,100 mm (161.4 in)
- Width: 1,765 mm (69.5 in)
- Height: 1,600 mm (63.0 in)

Chronology
- Predecessor: Hyundai Lavita/Matrix

The Hyundai ix20 is a car manufactured and marketed by Hyundai, which debuted at the 2010 Paris Motor Show. A mini MPV, the ix20 is a rebadged variant of the Kia Venga, sharing platforms with the Hyundai i20 and Kia Soul. The ix20 was exclusively sold in Europe, and is the replacement for the Lavita/Matrix.

== Overview ==
The ix20 employed styling marketed by Hyundai as its "Fluidic Sculpture" design language.

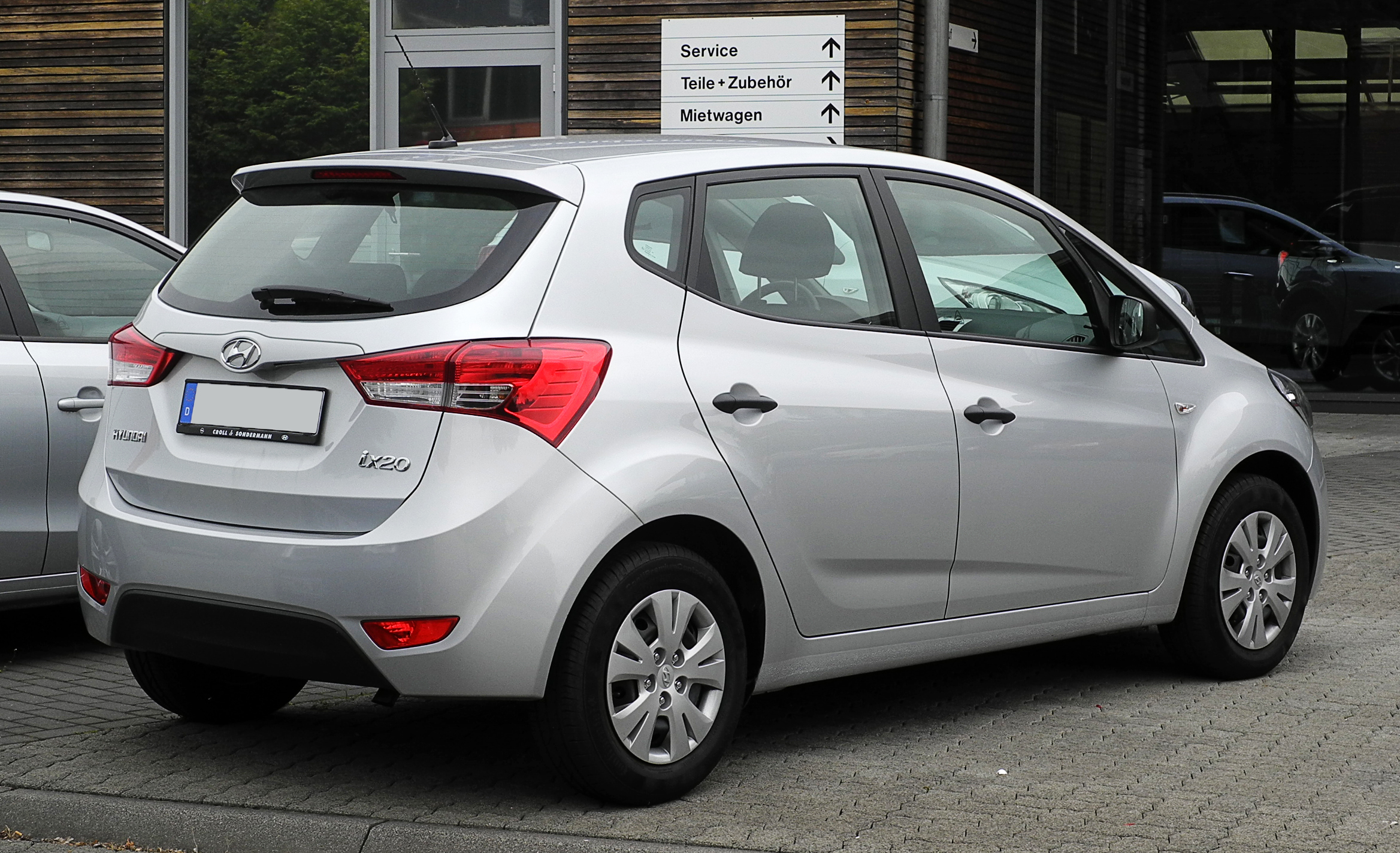
Rear view

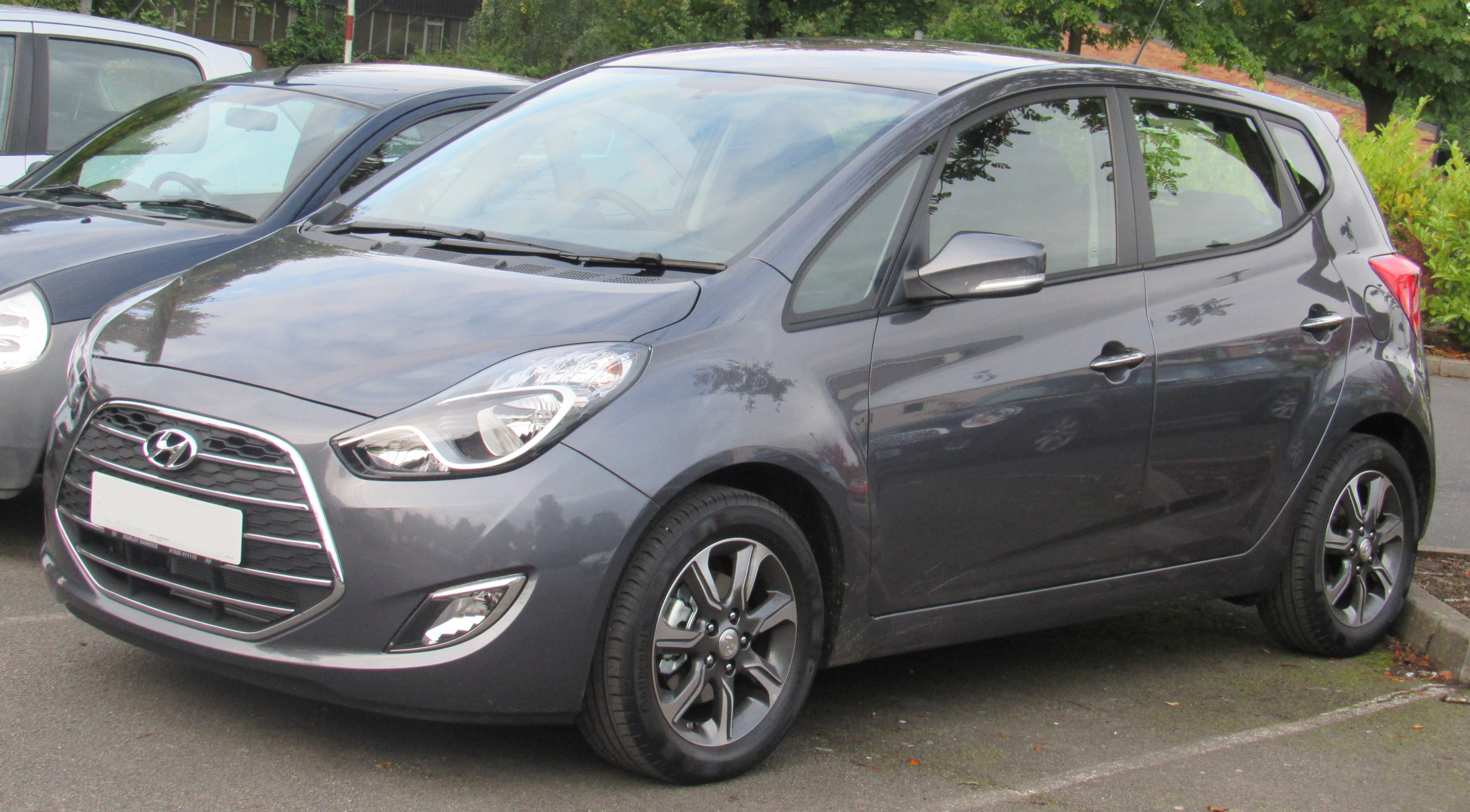
2015 facelift

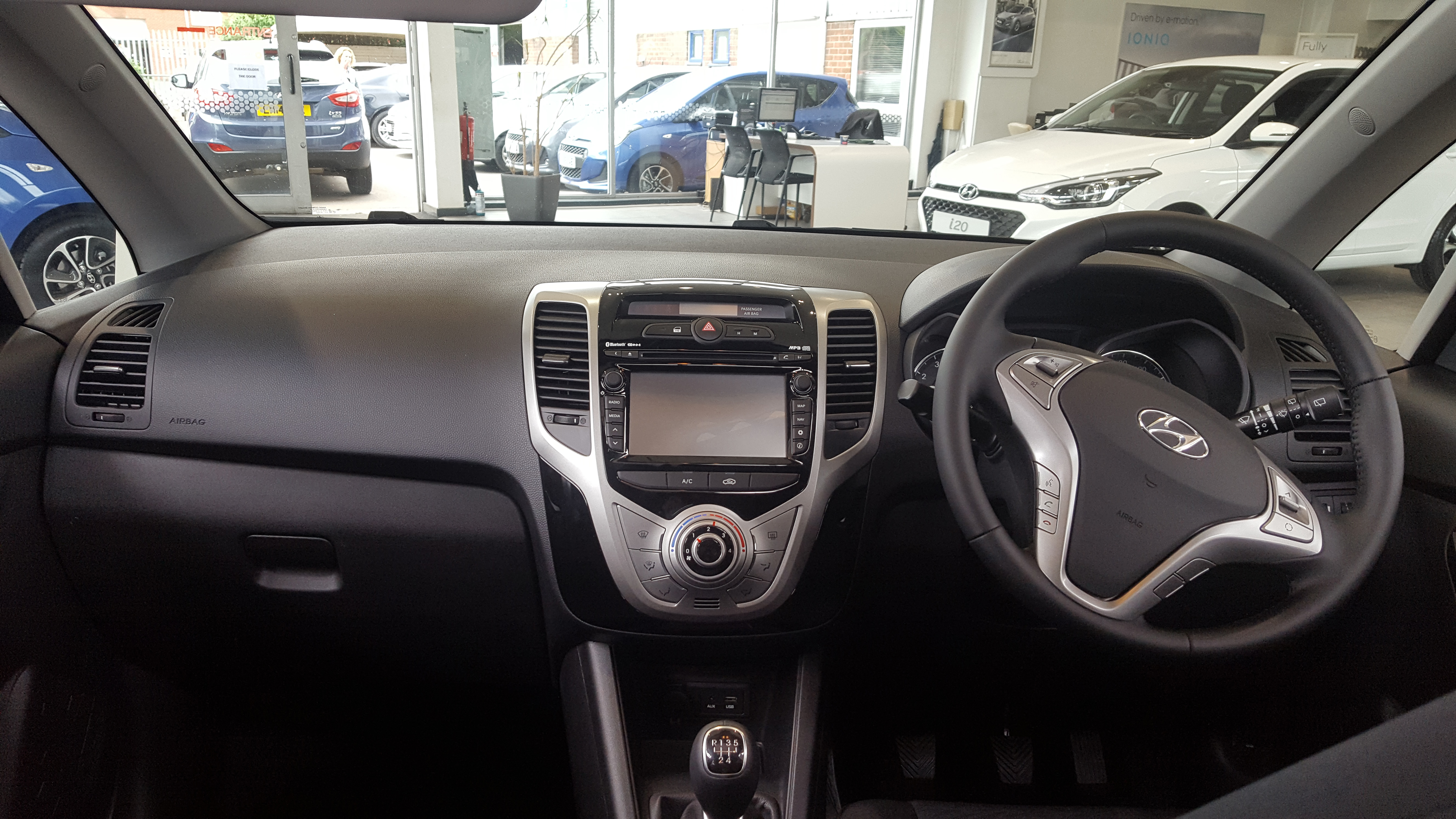
Interior (facelift)

== Powertrain ==
=== Petrol ===
- 1.4 — 90 PS (66 kW; 89 hp)
- 1.6 — 125 PS (92 kW; 123 hp)

=== Diesel ===
- 1.4 CRDi — 90 PS (66 kW; 89 hp)
- 1.6 CRDi — 116 PS (85 kW; 114 hp)
