= Hyundai Lavita =

Mini MPV

Hyundai Lavita (FC)
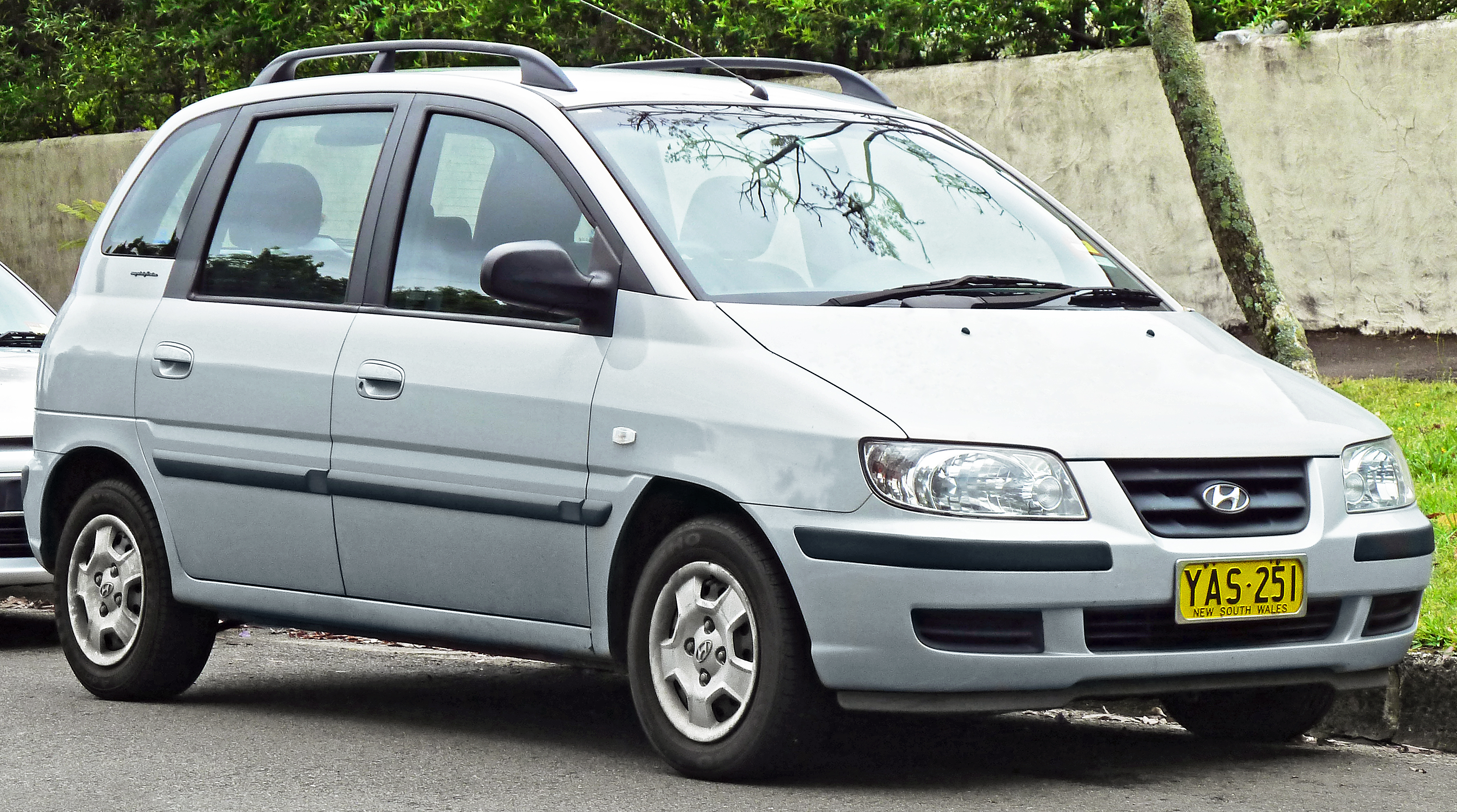
- Pre-facelift Hyundai Elantra LaVita (Australia)

Overview
- Manufacturer: Hyundai
- Also called: Hyundai Matrix (Europe, ASEAN and Israel); Hyundai Elantra LaVita (Australia); Inokom Matrix (Malaysia)
- Production: 2001–2007 (South Korea); 2007–2010 (Turkey)
- Assembly: Ulsan, South Korea; İzmit, Kocaeli Province, Turkey (Hyundai Assan); Kulim, Malaysia (Inokom); Cairo, Egypt (Ghabbour Group); Athens, Greece (Hyundai Hellas AEBE) Taiwan （Hsinchu）
- Designer: Lorenzo Ramaciotti (Pininfarina)

Body and chassis
- Class: Mini MPV
- Body style: 5-door hatchback
- Layout: Front-engine, front-wheel-drive
- Related: Hyundai Elantra; Hyundai Tucson; Hyundai Tiburon; Kia Spectra; Kia Sportage

Powertrain
- Engine: Petrol engines: 1.5 L Alpha II I4 (South Korea); 1.6 L Alpha II I4; 1.8 L Beta II I4; Diesel engines: 1.5 L D CRDi I3 turbo-diesel 1.5 L U CRDi-VGT I4 turbo-diesel
- Transmission: 5-speed manual 4-speed automatic

Dimensions
- Wheelbase: 2,600 mm (102.4 in)
- Length: 4,035 mm (158.9 in); 4,050 mm (159.4 in) (first facelift); 4,060 mm (159.8 in) (second facelift)
- Width: 1,740 mm (68.5 in)
- Height: 1,625 mm (64.0 in) (without roof rack); 1,685 mm (66.3 in)
- Curb weight: 1,223–1,316 kg (2,696.3–2,901.3 lb)

Chronology
- Successor: Hyundai ix20

The Hyundai Lavita is a multi purpose vehicle (MPV) produced by the South Korean manufacturer Hyundai, from 2001 to 2010. It was also marketed as the Hyundai Matrix in Europe and Southeast Asia, and as the Hyundai Elantra LaVita in Australia. It was mechanically related to the Hyundai Elantra (XD) and was designed by the Italian company Pininfarina.

Sales commenced in August 2001, and continued until the end of 2010, when it was replaced by the ix20.

== Overview ==
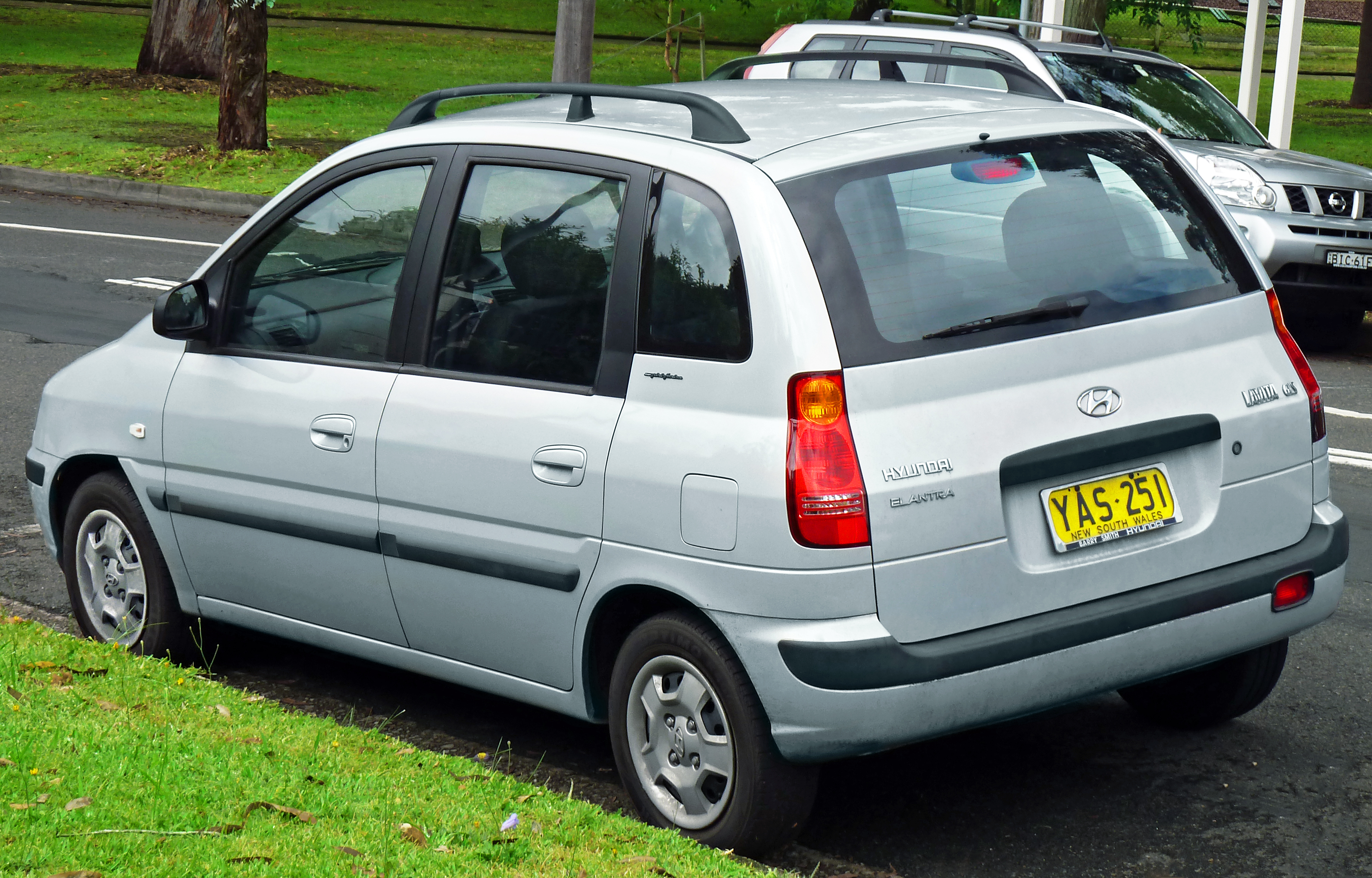
Pre-facelift Hyundai Elantra LaVita (Australia)

The Lavita is a five-door, five-seater hatchback and is available in 1.5, 1.6 and 1.8-litre petrol engines. The 1.8 has a top speed of 114 mph (183 km/h) and a 0 to 60 mph time of 11.3 seconds. In Europe, there were versions also available with turbo diesel engines, these were available from September 2001.

In Malaysia, the Lavita was locally assembled as the Inokom Matrix, which is available in both 1.6L and 1.8L petrol engine options. Hyundai facelifted the model in 2005. For 2008, Hyundai unveiled a second facelifted version at the Geneva Motor Show in March 2008.

It underwent major changes to the front fascia, similar in style to the first generation i30. New wheels were also part of the slew of changes. The C pillar window kink was eliminated. Minor changes were also made to the interior.

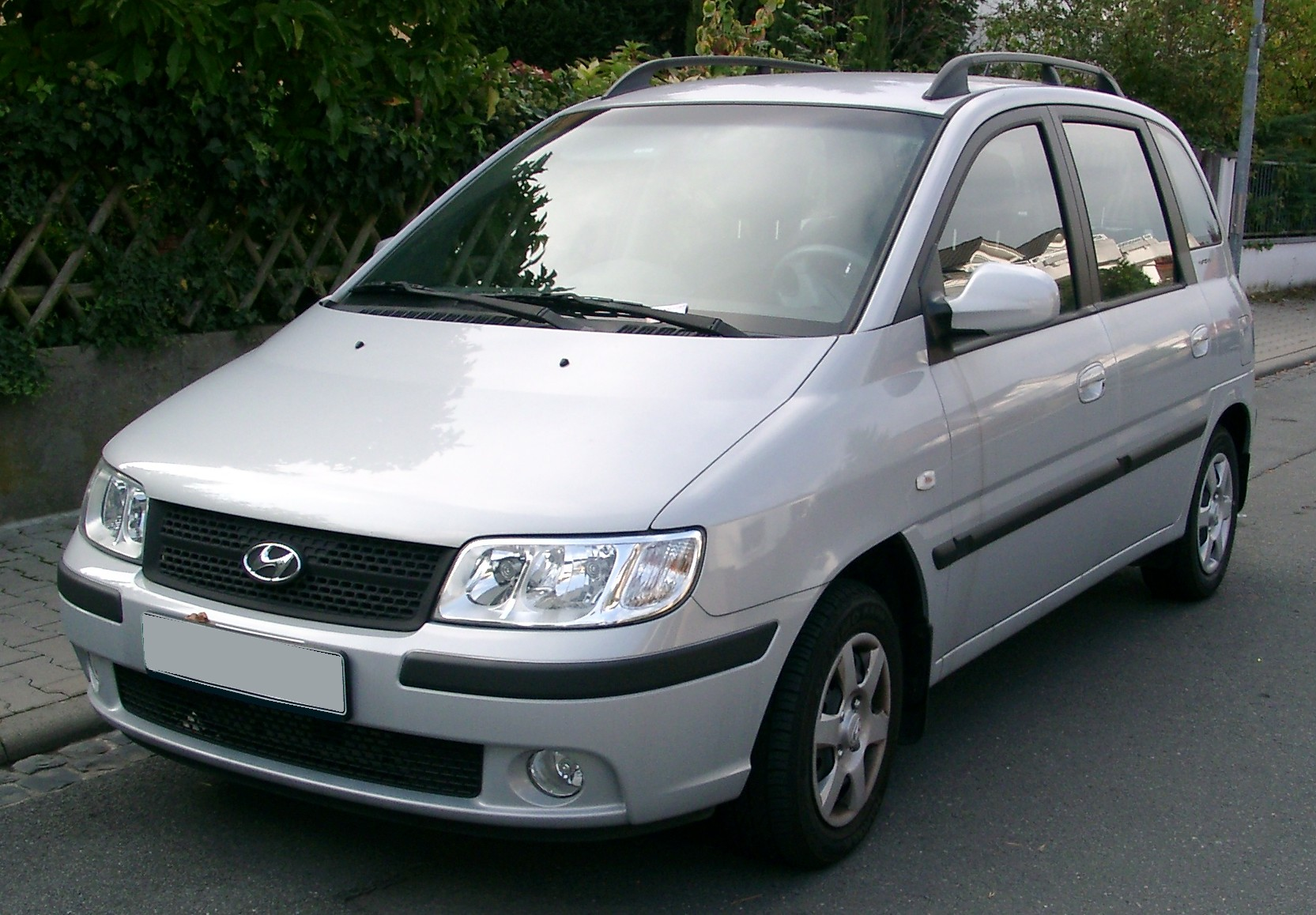
First facelift Hyundai Matrix (Europe)

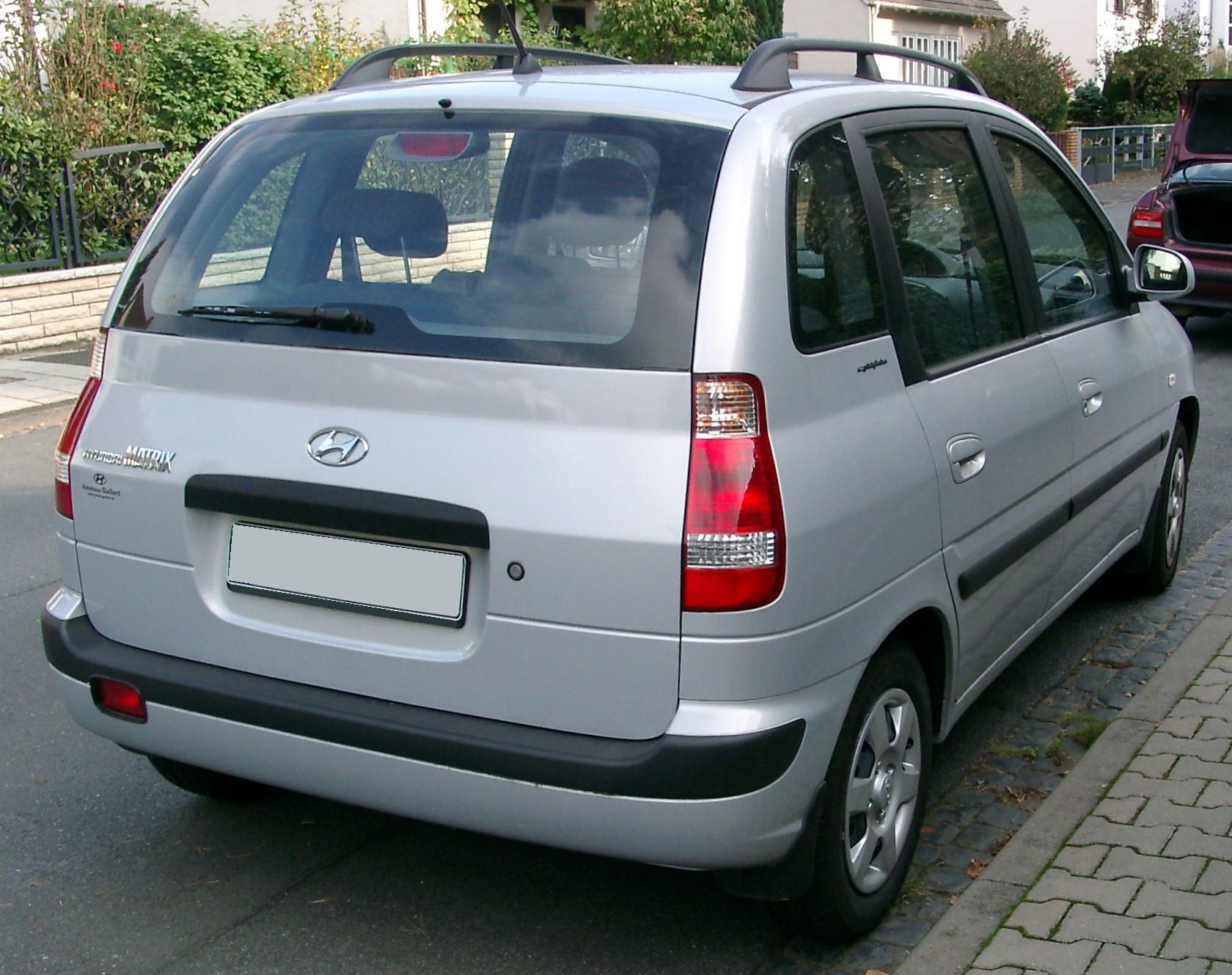
First facelift Hyundai Matrix (Europe)

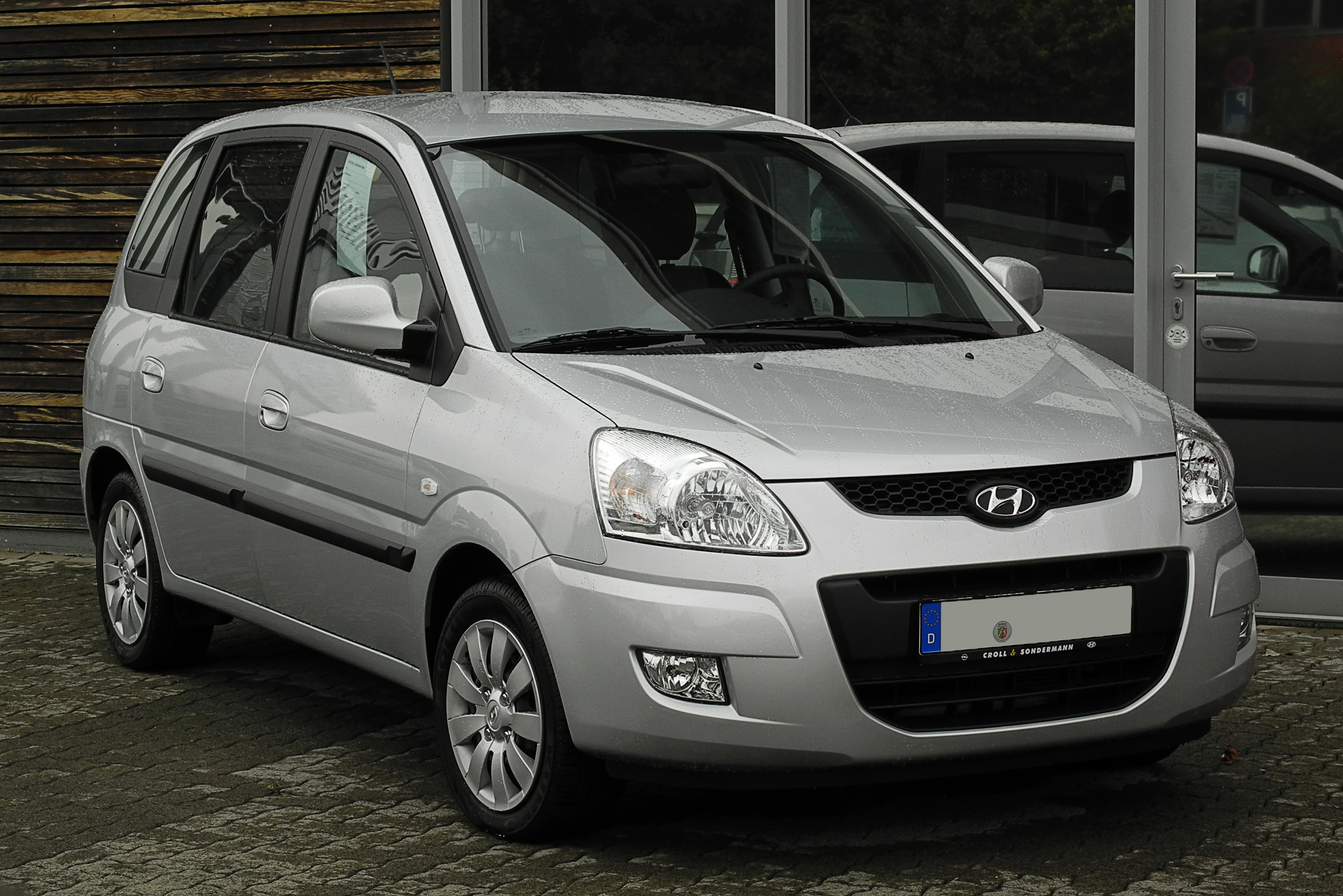
Second facelift Hyundai Matrix (Europe)

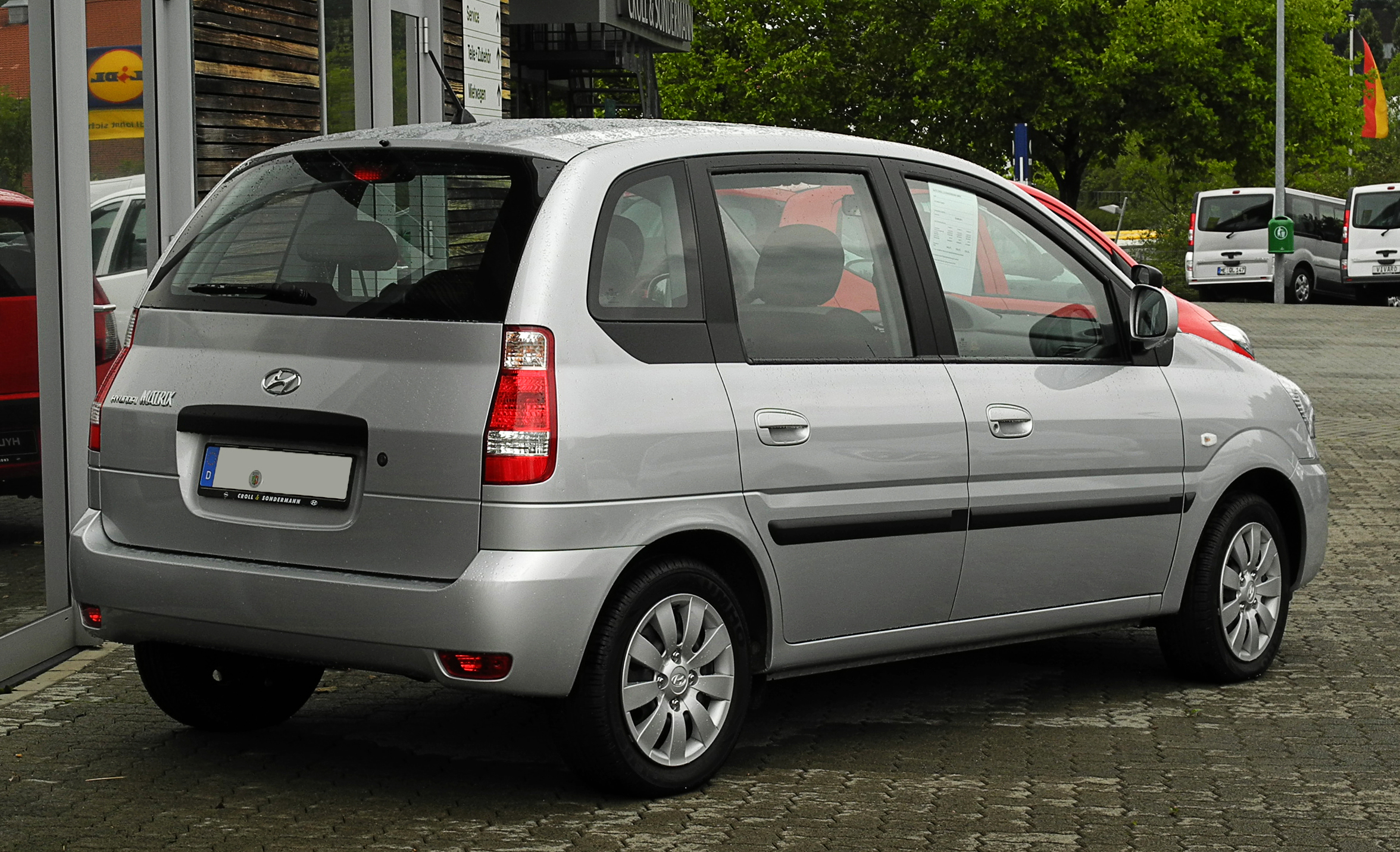
Second facelift Hyundai Matrix (Europe)
