= Kia Venga =

Mini MPV

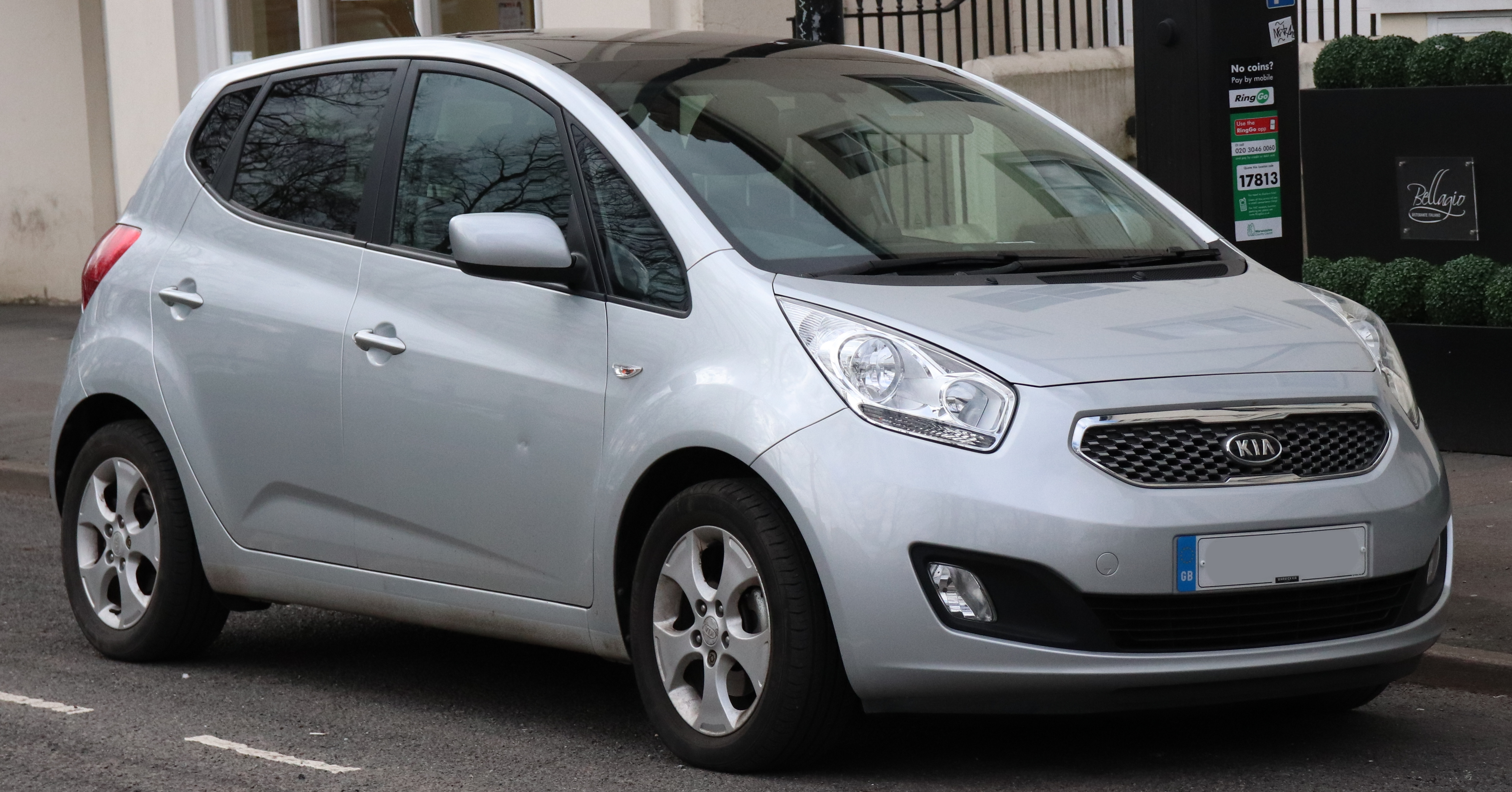

Overview
- Manufacturer: Kia
- Model code: YN
- Production: November 2009 – 2019
- Assembly: Czech Republic: Nošovice (HMMC); Slovakia: Žilina (KMS); Russia: Kaliningrad (Avtotor)
- Designer: Gregory Guillaume; Peter Schreyer

Body and chassis
- Class: Mini MPV
- Body style: 5-door hatchback
- Layout: Front-engine, front-wheel-drive
- Platform: Hyundai-Kia PB
- Related: Hyundai ix20; Hyundai i20 (PB); Kia Rio (UB); Kia Soul (AM)

Powertrain
- Engine: Petrol: 1.4 L Gamma MPI I4; 1.6 L Gamma MPI I4; Diesel: 1.4 L U CRDi I4; 1.6 L U CRDi I4
- Transmission: 5-speed manual; 6-speed manual; 4-speed automatic; 6-speed automatic

Dimensions
- Wheelbase: 2,615 mm (103.0 in)
- Length: 4,075 mm (160.4 in)
- Width: 1,765 mm (69.5 in)
- Height: 1,600 mm (63.0 in)

The Kia Venga is a car manufactured by Kia for the European market across a single generation between 2009 and 2019, with a high-roof mini MPV design.

The Venga debuted at the 2009 Frankfurt Auto Show sharing platforms with Kia Soul (and the outgoing Rio). The Venga and Hyundai ix20 are badge engineered variants.

The name Venga is Spanish for "come" or "come with."

== Design ==
The Venga was styled by Gregory Guillaume at Kia's Rüsselsheim Research and Development Center, under the direction of Peter Schreyer, head of Kia's European design studio. It was based on Kia's No3 concept, introduced at the 2009 Geneva Auto Show.

With a design emphasizing interior space and practicality, the Venga featured a long wheelbase for its class, at 2,615 mm; a 1,600 mm high roofline to maximize cabin space; and aerodynamic Cd of 0.31. The 440-litre boot expanded to 1253 litres with the rear seats folded. The split-folding rear seats also slid fore and aft by up to 130 mm and can fold completely flat, without the need to adjust or remove the seat headrests.

All models featured anti-lock brakes, electronic stability control, hill-start, hazard lights activated via emergency braking, tire pressure monitoring, six airbags, load-limiting pre-tensioned seatbelts and active front headrests. Upper trim level equipment included panoramic sunroof, LED rear lights, keyless ignition, welcome-home lights and a heated steering wheel.

The Venga employed Kia's corporate grille, known as the Tiger Nose. The MPV won Germany's iF Design Award in 2009, followed by a Red Dot (product design) award in 2010.

Kia released a facelifted Venga in early 2015, with a larger front grille, revised bumper fascia, and a new six-speed automatic transmission replacing the previous four-speed one. Production of the Venga ended in early 2019, without a successor.

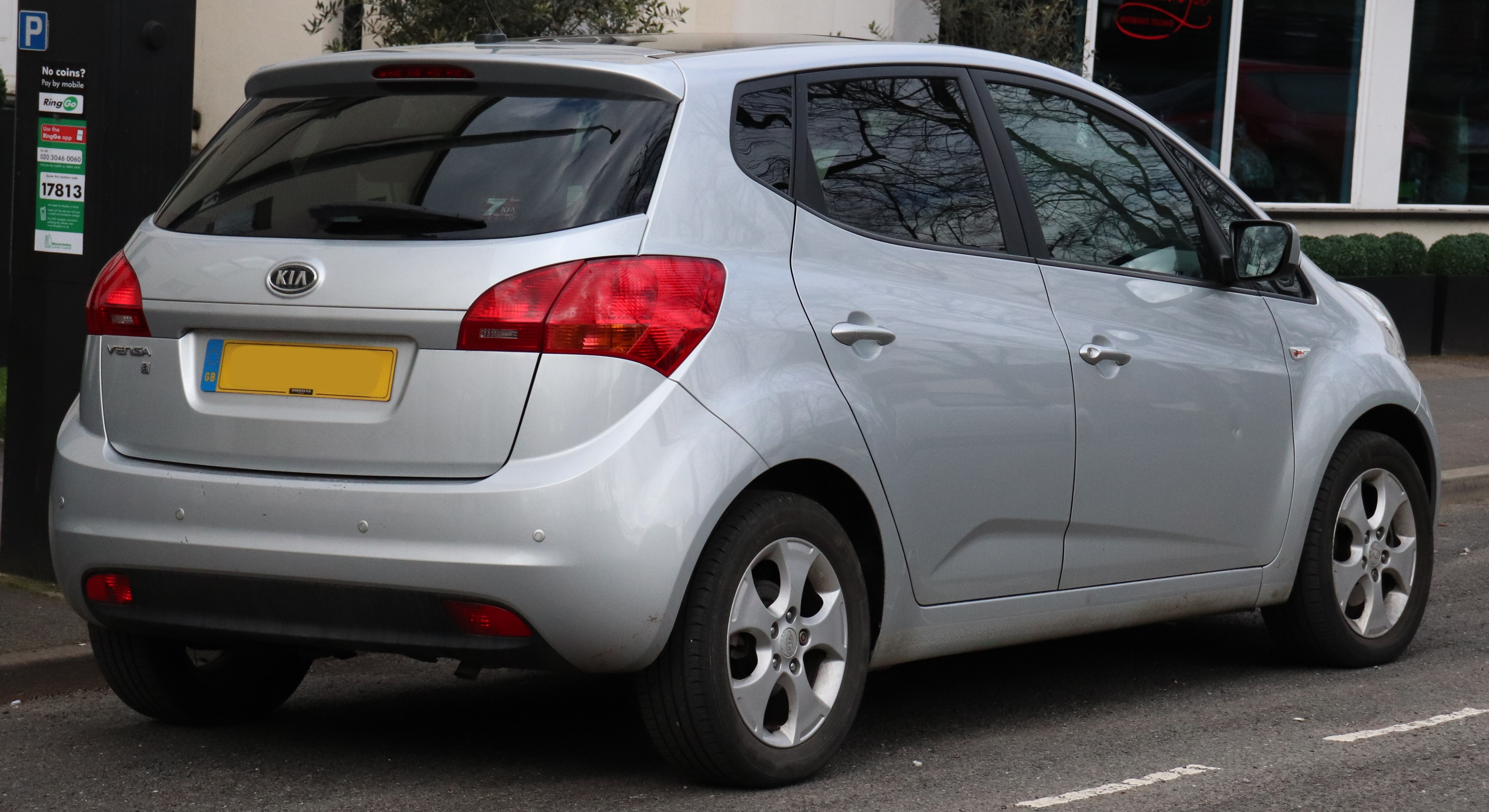
Rear view (pre-facelift)

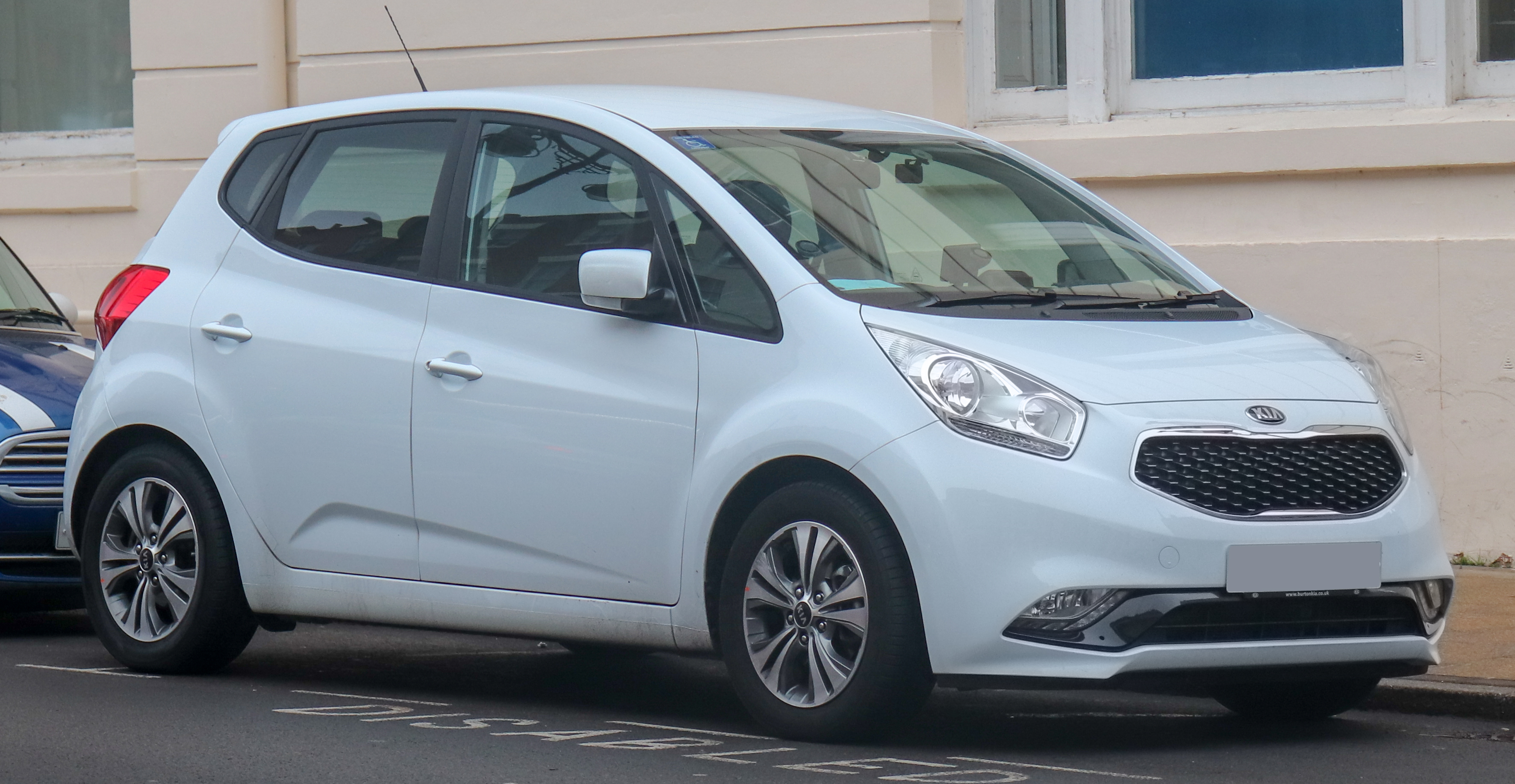
Front view (facelift)

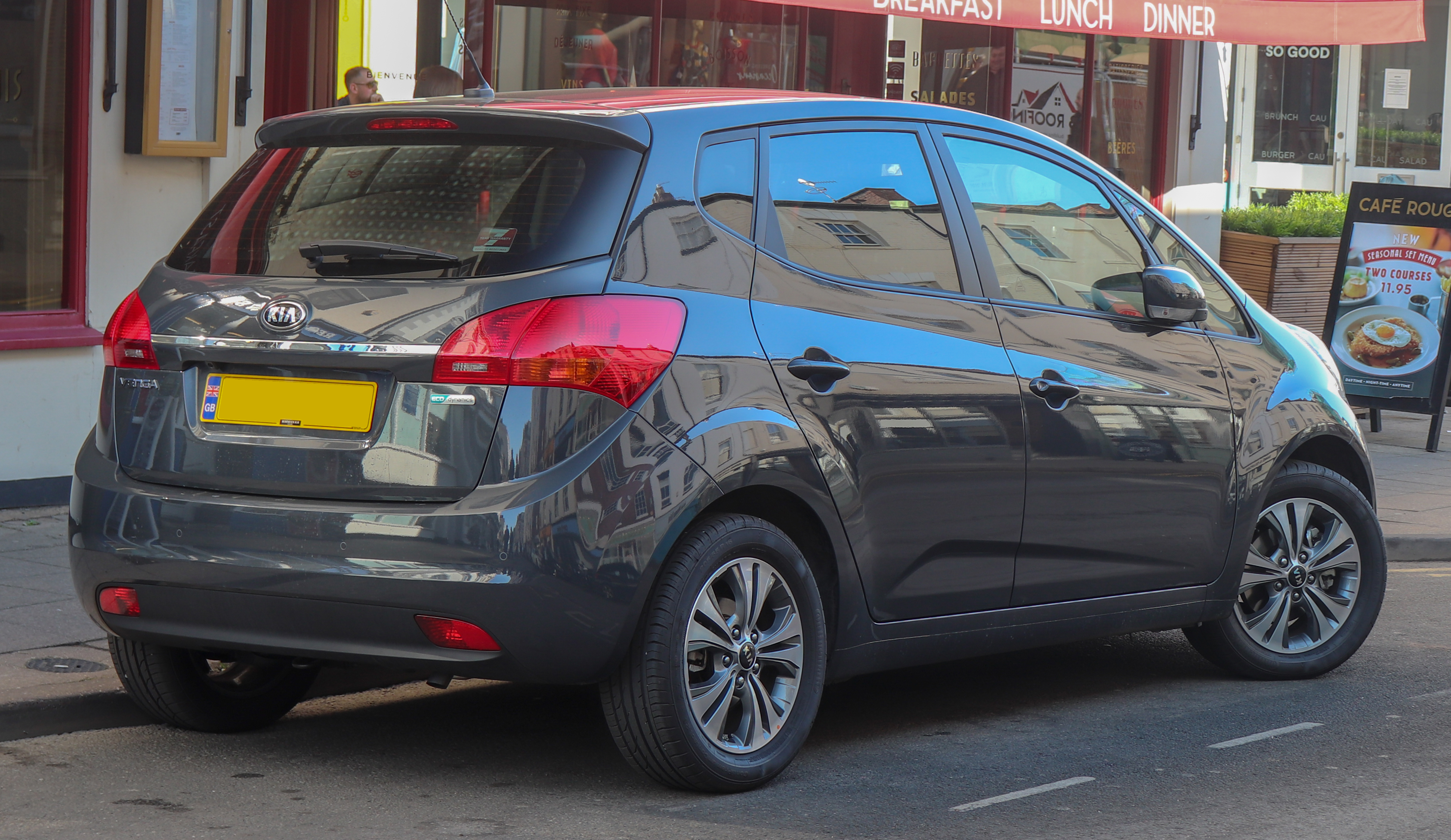
Rear view (facelift)

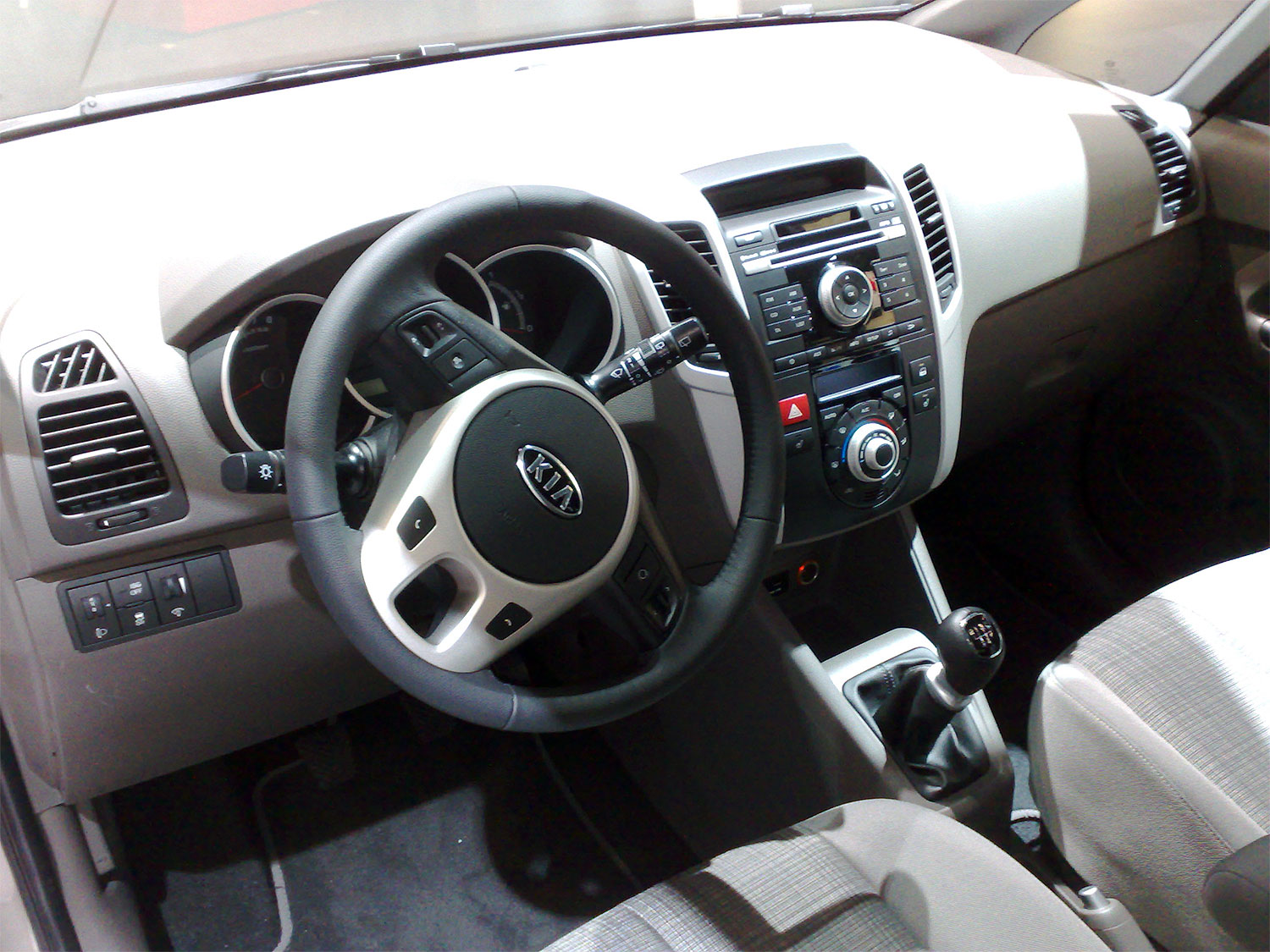
Interior

== Safety ==
Euro NCAP

Euro NCAP test results for a LHD, five door hatchback variant on a registration from 2010:

Test	Score	Points
Overall:	4/5 stars	
Adult occupant:	79%	28.4
Child occupant:	66%	32.3
Pedestrian:	64%	23
Safety assist:	71%	5

Following the initial test, Kia made several structural and safety improvements to the Venga, and had it reassessed.

Test	Score	Points
Overall:	5/5 stars	
Adult occupant:	89%	32.1
Child occupant:	85%	41.8
Pedestrian:	64%	23
Safety assist:	71%	5

== Reception ==
The Venga was met with mixed reviews in Europe. Top Gear gave the car a score of 4 out of 10, calling it: "As sensible and tasty as a dry cracker. A decent enough car, perhaps one for the Freedom Pass brigade." Autocar rated it three out of five stars, praising the spacious interior, refined engine, and generous specification, but criticizing the leisurely performance, bland styling, and price.

What Car? gave the car two out of five stars. Auto Express gave it three out of five stars, saying: "The Kia Venga has made a big impact in the mini MPV sector, with great space and strong value."
