= List of Hyundai engines =

Hyundai Motor Company has produced the following families of automobile engines. Until 2018, gasoline engines used a naming system based on Greek letters.

- Spark Ignition (Gasoline)
  - Straight-3
    - Epsilon ε - 0.8 L
    - Kappa κ - 1.0 L
    - Smartstream - 1.0 L
  - Straight-4
    - Epsilon ε - 1.0/1.1 L
    - Kappa κ - 1.2/1.25/1.4/1.6 L
    - Alpha α - 1.3/1.4/1.5/1.6 L
    - Gamma γ - 1.4/1.6 L
    - Sirius - 1.5/1.6/1.8/2.0/2.4 L
    - Beta β - 1.6/1.8/2.0 L
    - Nu ν - 1.8/2.0 L
    - Theta θ - 1.8/2.0/2.4 L
    - Smartstream - 1.2/1.4/1.5/1.6/2.0/2.5 L
  - V6
    - Delta Δ - 2.0/2.5/2.7 L
    - Mu μ - 2.7 L
    - Sigma Σ - 3.0/3.5 L
    - Lambda Λ - 3.0/3.3/3.5/3.8 L
    - Smartstream - 3.5 L
  - V8
    - Omega Ω - 4.5 L
    - Tau τ - 4.6/5.0 L
    - G8MR - 3.2 L
- Compression Ignition (Diesel)
  - Straight-3
    - U - 1.1/1.2 L
    - D4B- 1.5 L
    - D - 1.5 L
  - Straight-4
    - U - 1.4/1.5/1.6/1.7 L
    - D - 2.0/2.2 L
    - Smartstream - 1.5/1.6/2.0/2.2 L
    - D4B- 2.0/2.2 L
    - R - 2.0/2.2 L
    - A - 2.5 L
    - J- 2.9 L
    - G- 4.0 L
  - I6
    - G4B 5.9 L
    - H- 10 L
    - Powertec 12 L
    - KK/KK- 6.6 L
    - GG-BK- 11 L
  - V6
    - S - 3.0 L
  - V8
    - D8A - 16/18 L

== See also ==
- List of Hyundai transmissions
- List of Hyundai vehicles
- Hyundai
- ICE
