= Beijing Hyundai =

Chinese automobile manufacturing company

Beijing Hyundai Motor Co., Ltd.

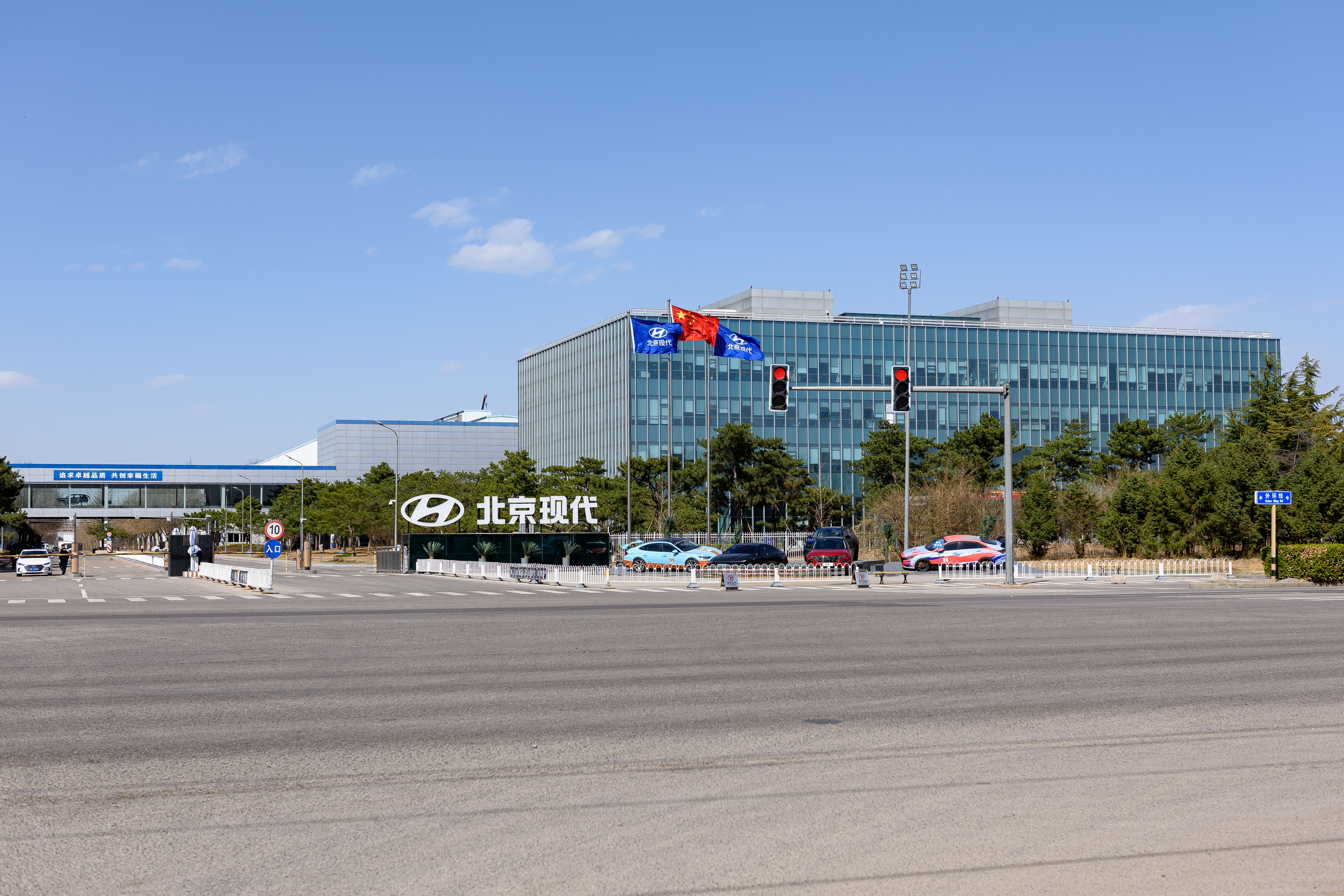
- Headquarters
- Type: Joint venture
- Industry: Automotive
- Founded: October 18, 2002; 24 years ago
- Headquarters: Shunyi, Beijing, China
- Area served: China
- Products: Automobiles
- Owner: BAIC Motor (50%); Hyundai (50%)
- Number of employees: 15,000

Chinese name
- Simplified Chinese: 北京现代汽车有限公司
- Traditional Chinese: 北京現代汽車有限公司
Transcriptions
Standard Mandarin
- Hanyu Pinyin: Běijīng Xiàndài Qìchē Yǒuxiàn Gōngsī

Beijing Hyundai
- Simplified Chinese: 北京现代
- Traditional Chinese: 北京現代
Transcriptions
Standard Mandarin
- Hanyu Pinyin: Běijīng Xiàndài
- Wade–Giles: Pei^{3}-ching^{1} Hsien^{4}-tai^{4}
- IPA: [pèɪ̯tɕíŋ ɕi̯ɛ̌ntǎɪ̯]
Yue: Cantonese
- Yale Romanization: Bākgīng Yihndoih
- Jyutping: Bak1 ging1 jin6 doi6

South Korean name
- Hangul: 북경현대
- Hanja: 北京現代
Transcriptions
- Revised Romanization: Bukkyeong Hyeondae
- McCune–Reischauer: Pukkyŏng Hyŏndae
- Website: www.beijing-hyundai.com.cn

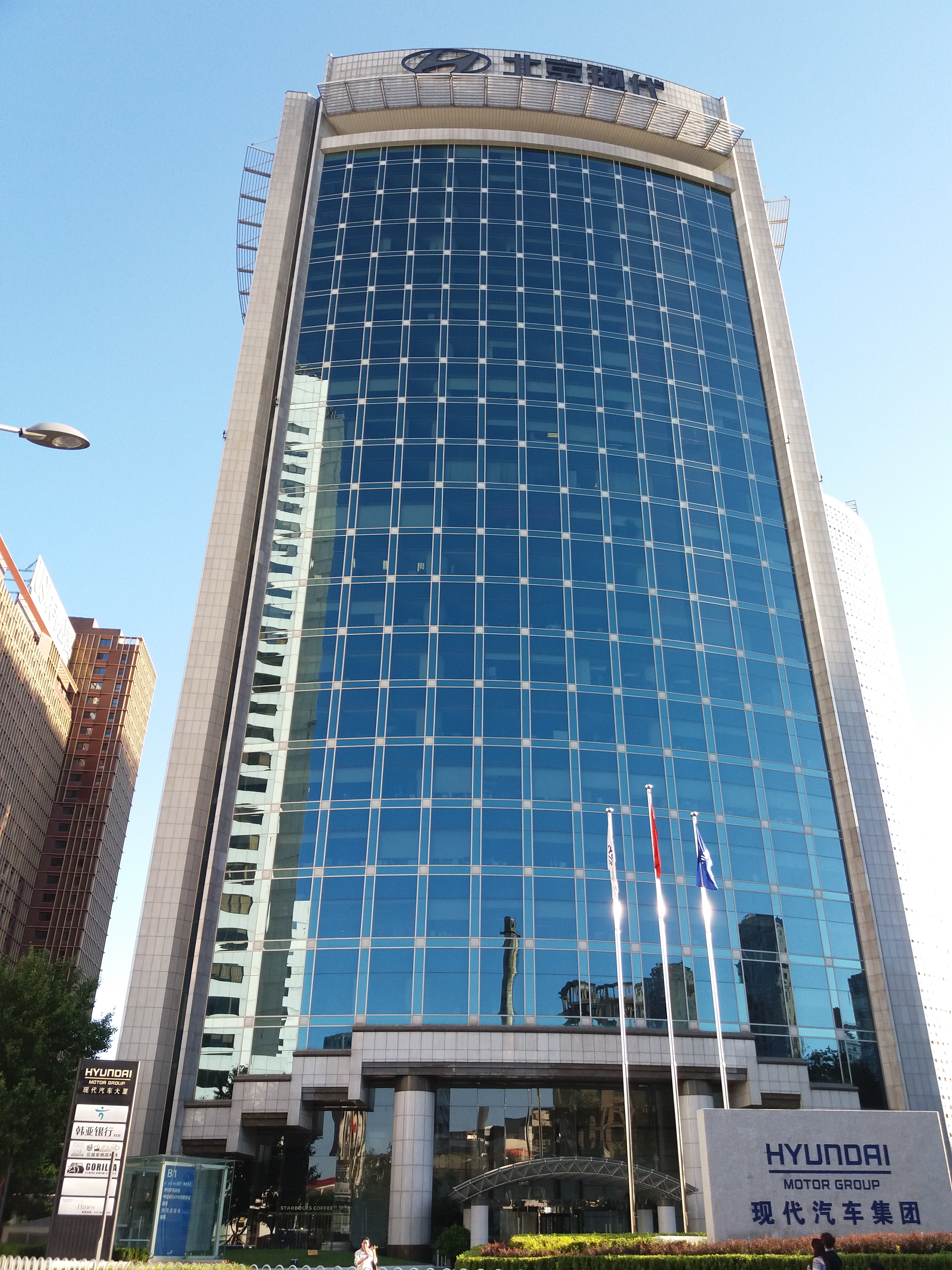
Beijing Hyundai Office building in Beijing

Beijing Hyundai Motor Co., Ltd. is an automobile manufacturing company headquartered in Shunyi, Beijing, China, and a joint-venture between BAIC Motor and Hyundai Motor Company. Established in 2002, it manufactures in Shunyi District, a satellite city of Beijing, producing Hyundai-branded automobiles for the Chinese market.

== History ==
In May 2002, Hyundai Motor and the Beijing Automotive Group signed a memorandum of understanding with the aim of creating a joint venture based around an existing Beijing factory. Hyundai begun to improve the plant's installations, and on 18 October 2002 an equally owned joint venture between the two companies was established. While it was not the first arrangement between a foreign and a domestic automaker, Beijing Hyundai was the first to be approved by the Chinese government after its entry into the World Trade Organization. The joint venture initially expanded its production output through importation of key parts from South Korea and the creation of an integrated, Korean-owned supply network inside China. Beijing Hyundai's sedan sales in 2005 were 224,700 units, ranking fourth in the country. By 2010, Beijing Hyundai sales reached 700,000, and Hyundai Motor Group became the number 2 carmaker in China behind Volkswagen.

2014 saw the company sell 1,120,000 vehicles, and in 2016, Hyundai reached its peak, selling 1.14 million vehicles.

=== Decline ===
Unit sales and year-on-year rate in China. From March 2017, unit sales plummeted in retaliation for the installation of THAAD.

Following various issues, including the rise of Chinese car companies, marketing problems, and the 2016-17 THAAD controversy, after which many South Korean businesses were boycotted by Chinese consumers, Beijing Hyundai sales collapsed, dropping to just 248,839 by 2022, 240,792 in 2023, and 168,828 in 2024.

After the collapse in sales, the company sold its first factory in Beijing in 2021 to Li Auto, and in 2024, it sold another factory in Chongqing for just $226 million, less than half its listing price. Additionally, it lacks competitive NEV products despite it being half of Chinese car market share; in 2024, the only NEVs in the lineup were the imported Nexo hydrogen vehicle and Ioniq 5N.

In November 2024, Hyundai announced that it was establishing an R&D center in Shanghai focused on developing ADAS and cockpit software solutions. Additionally, it announced plans to introduce a China-only EV model.

== Sales ==
China sales
Year	Sales
2010	703,008
2011	739,800
2012	852,506
2013	1,029,222
2014	1,120,048
2015	1,058,553
2016	1,138,125
2017	755,659
2018	782,163
2019	685,126
2020	385,697
2021	361,395
2022	248,839
2023	240,792
2024	168,828

== Products ==
=== Current production ===
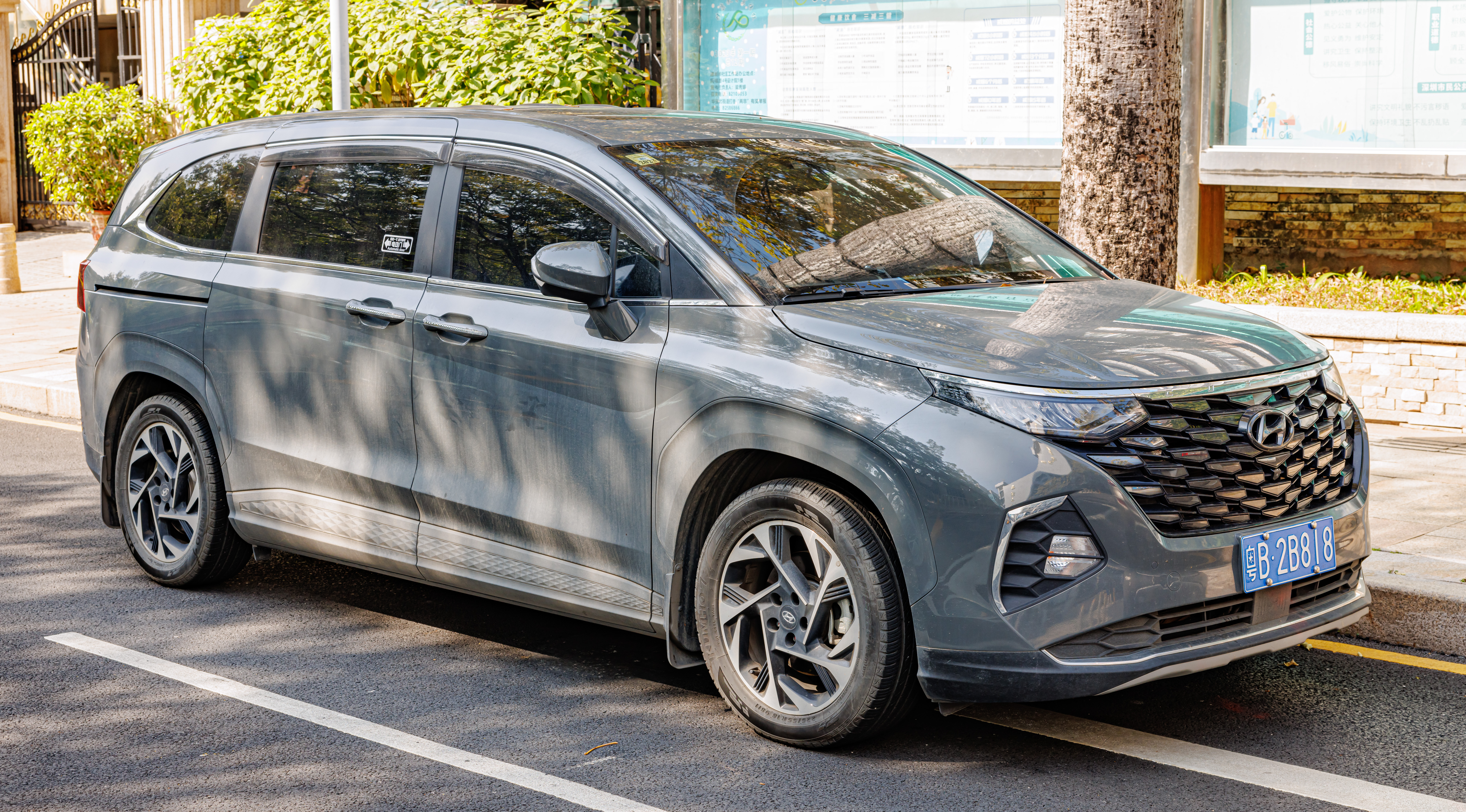
2021–present
现代库斯途
Hyundai Custo

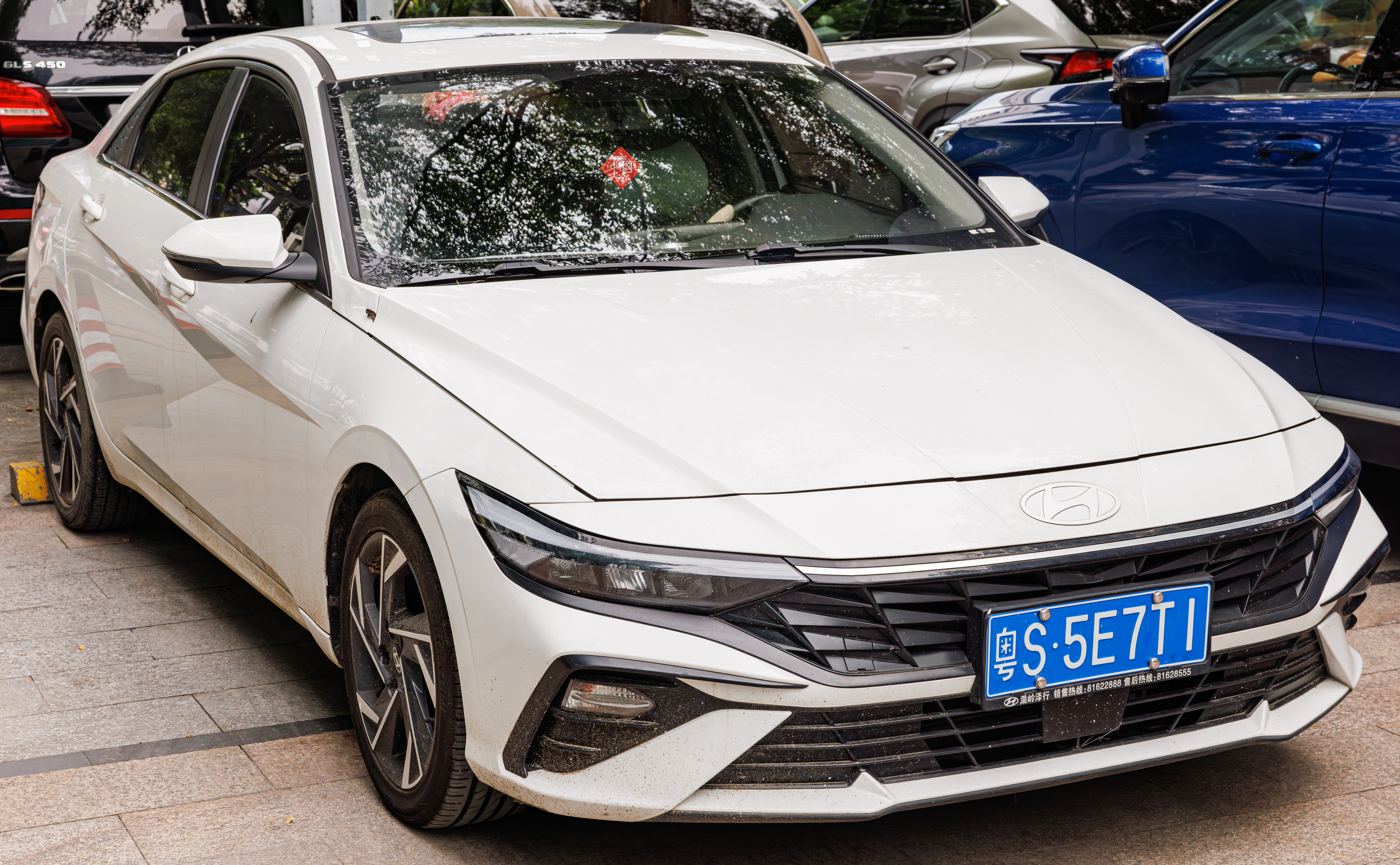
2021–present
现代伊兰特CN7
Hyundai Elantra CN7

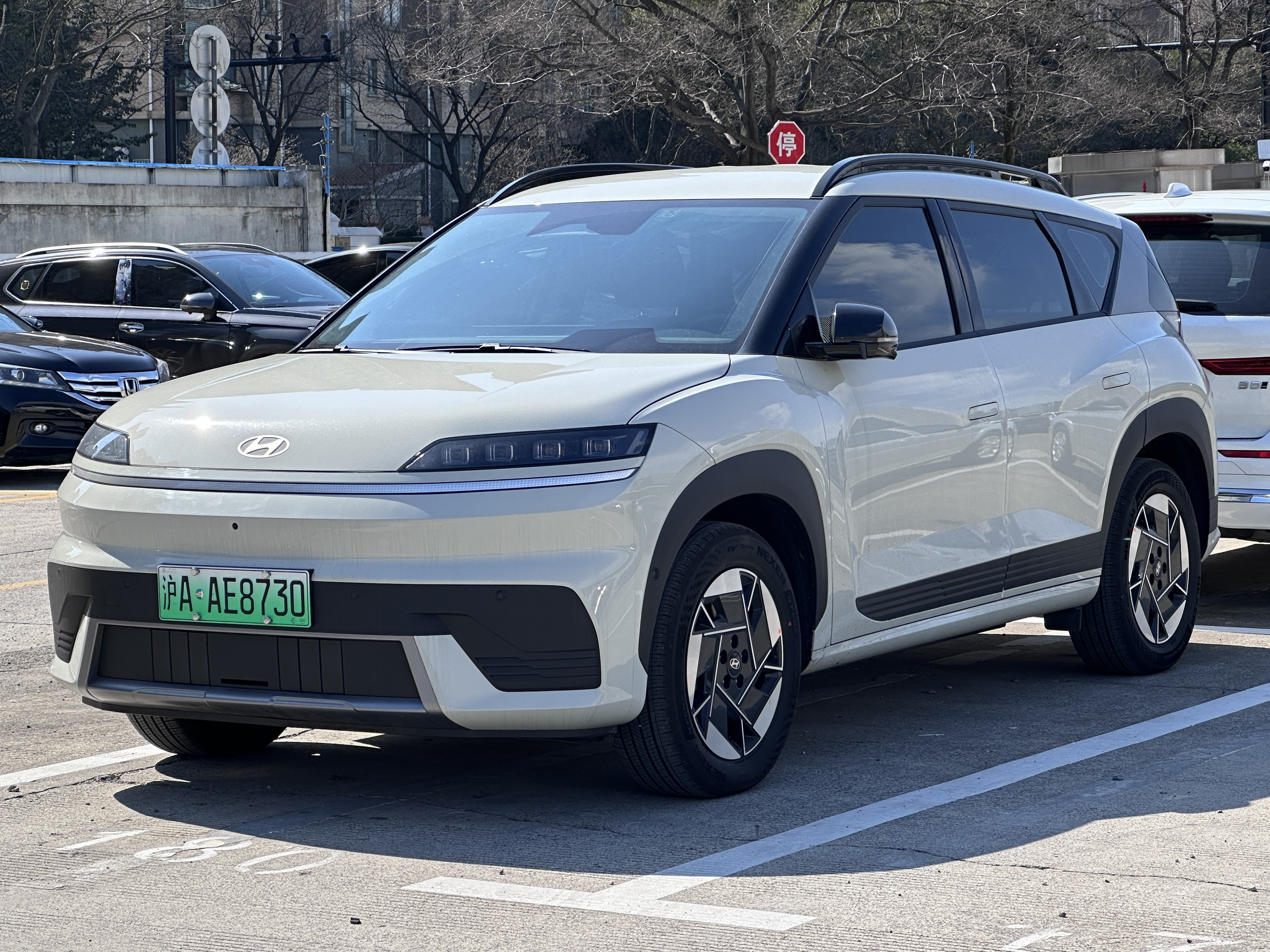
2025–present
现代羿欧
Hyundai EO

2026–present
现代艾尼氪V
Hyundai Ioniq V

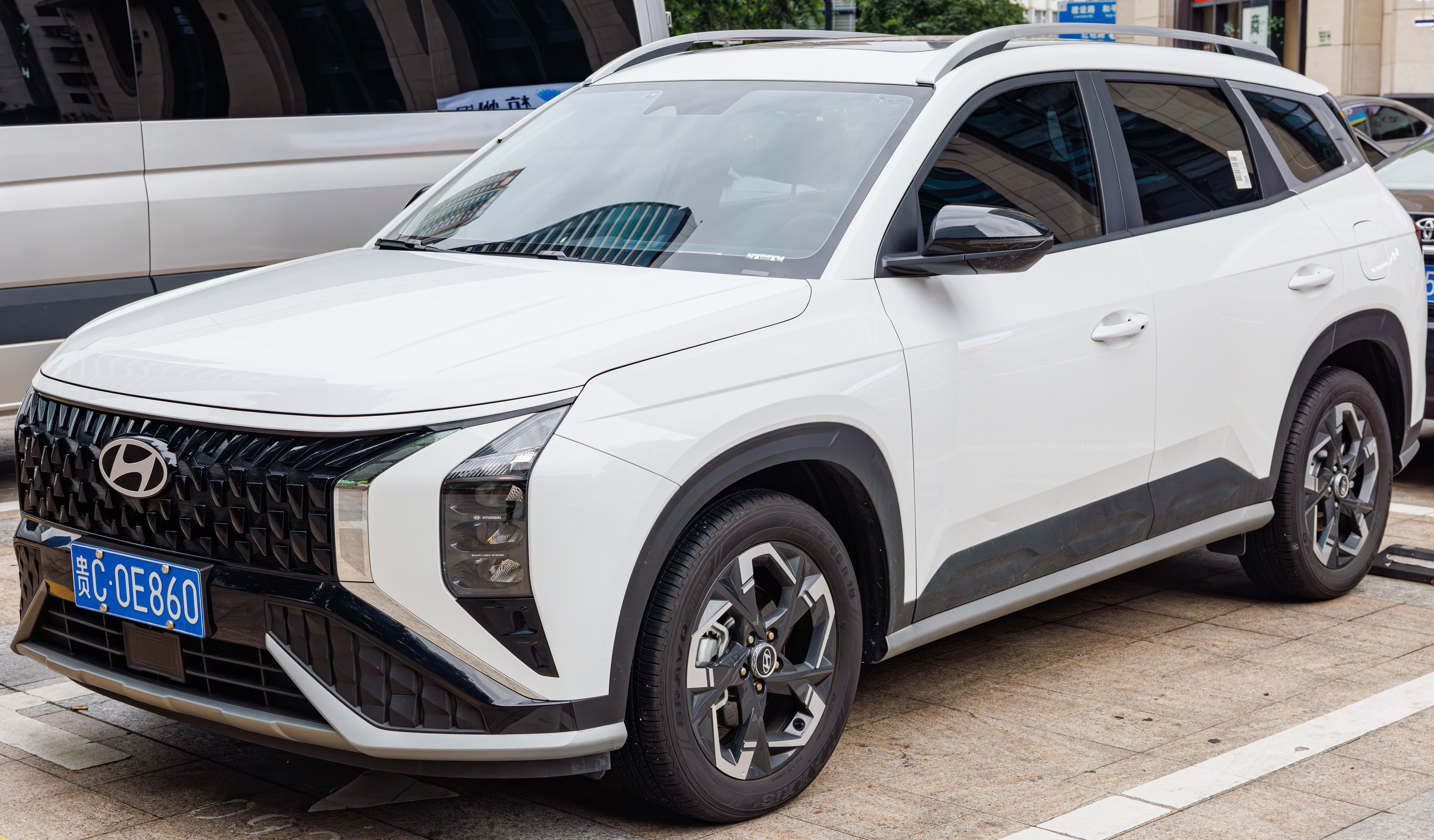
2023–present
现代沐飒
Hyundai Mufasa

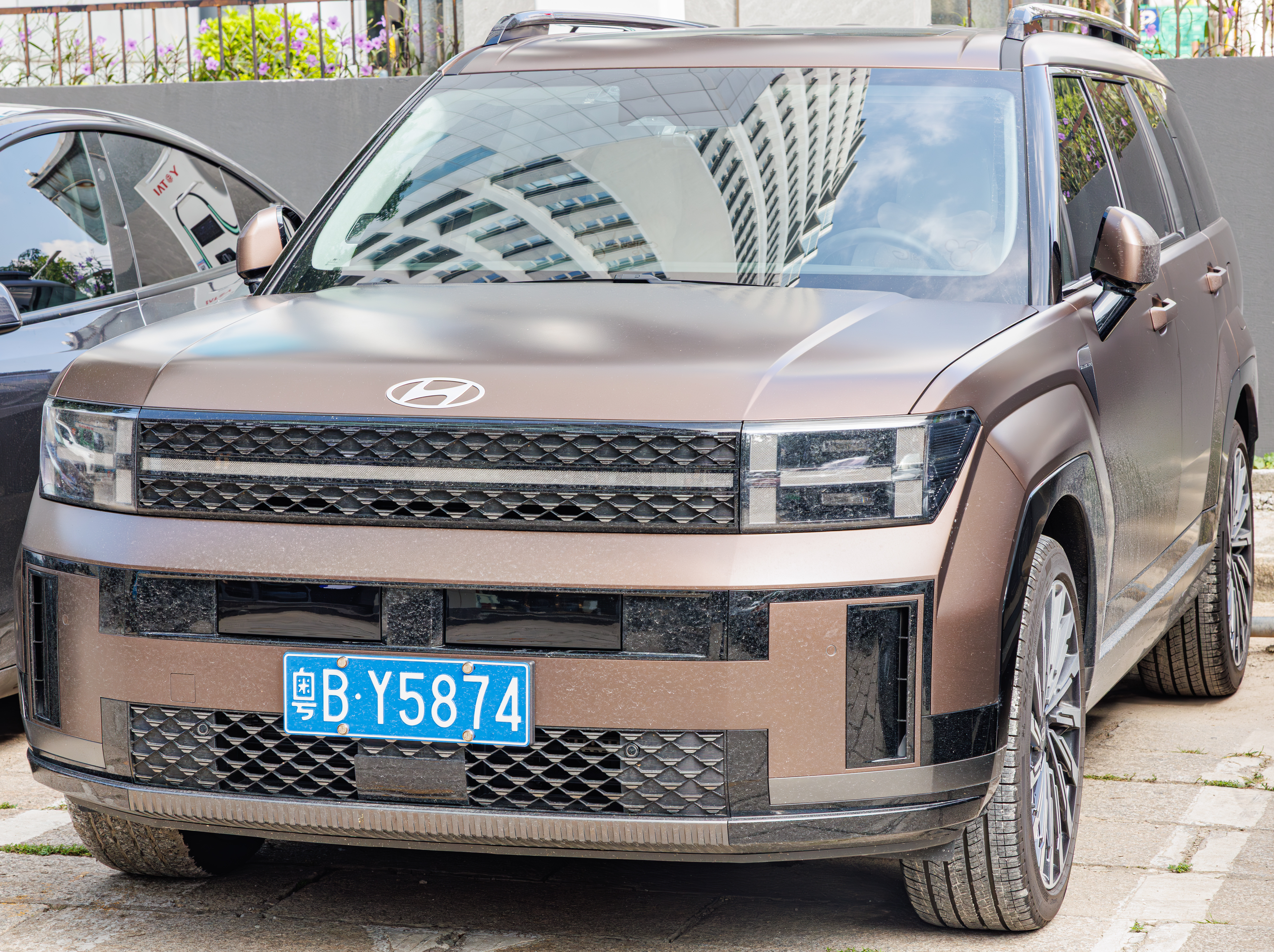
2024–present
现代胜达MX5
Hyundai Santa Fe MX5

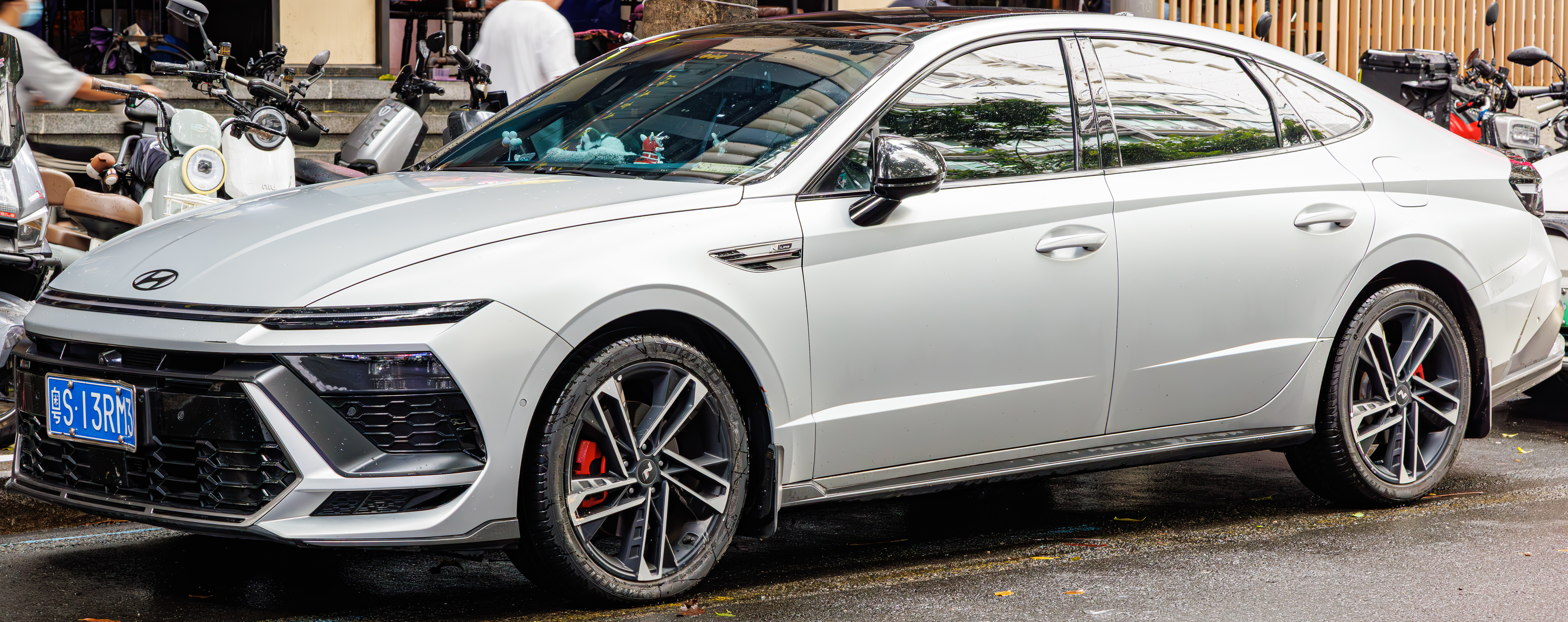
2020–present
现代索纳塔DN8
Hyundai Sonata DN8

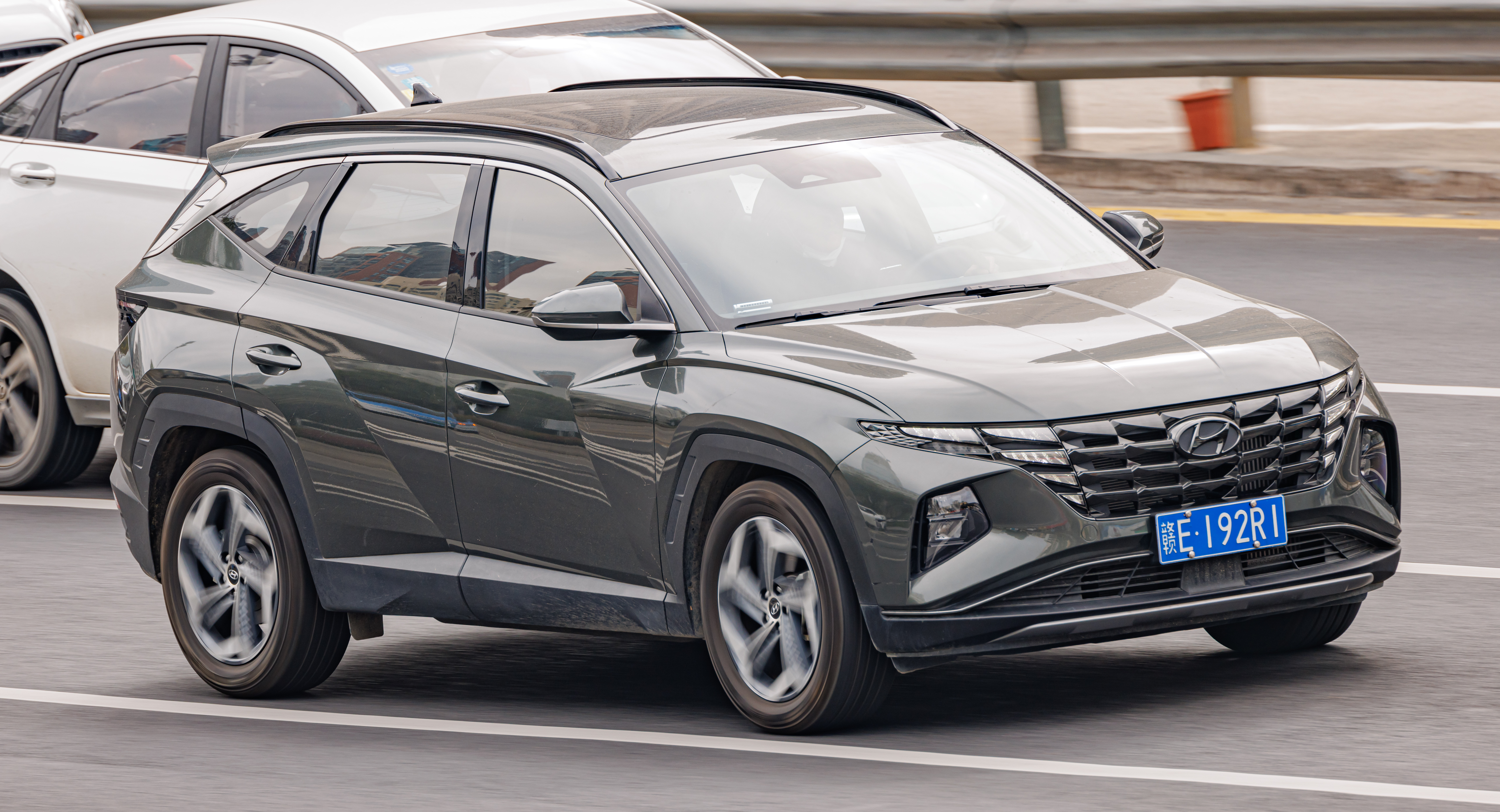
2021–present
现代途胜L NX4
Hyundai Tucson L NX4

=== Former production ===
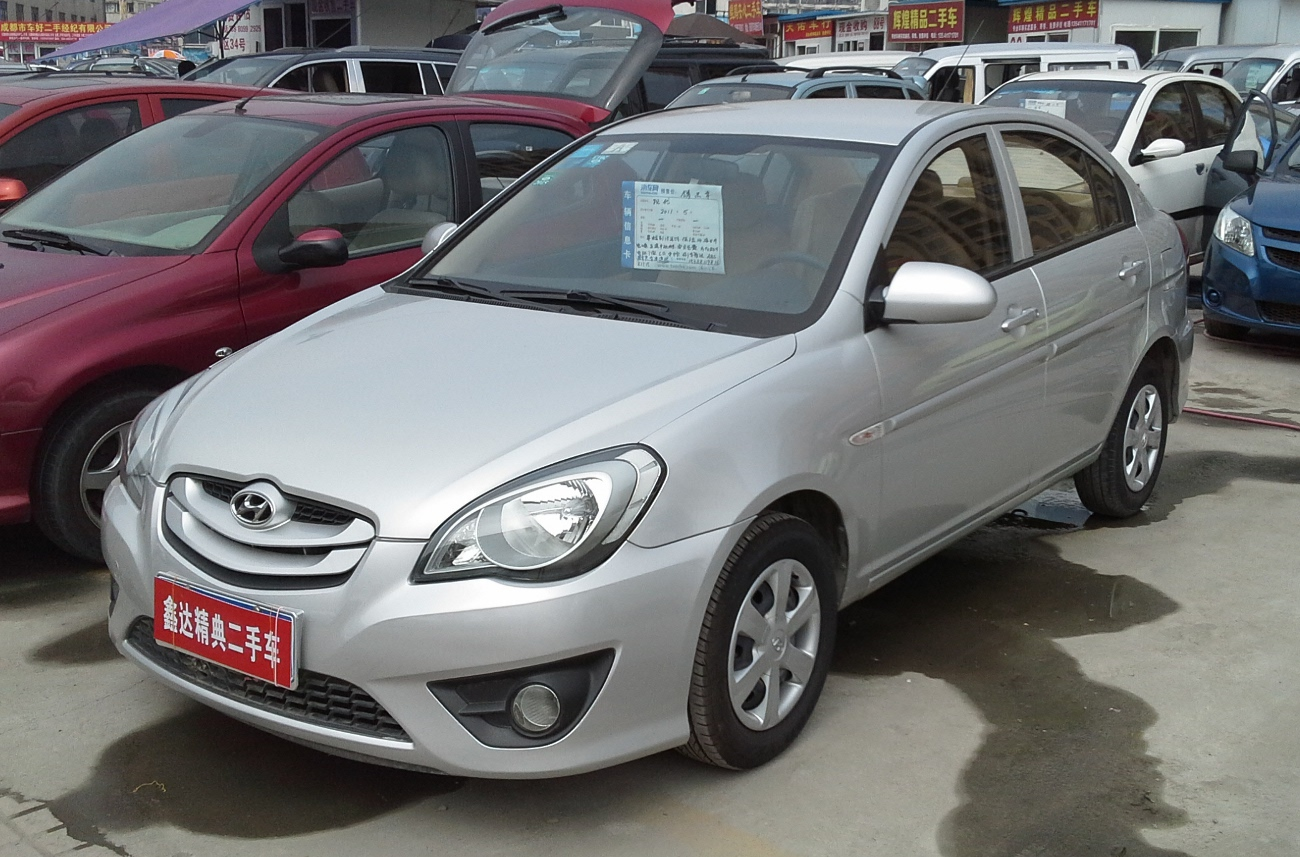
2006–2010
现代雅绅特MC
Hyundai Accent MC

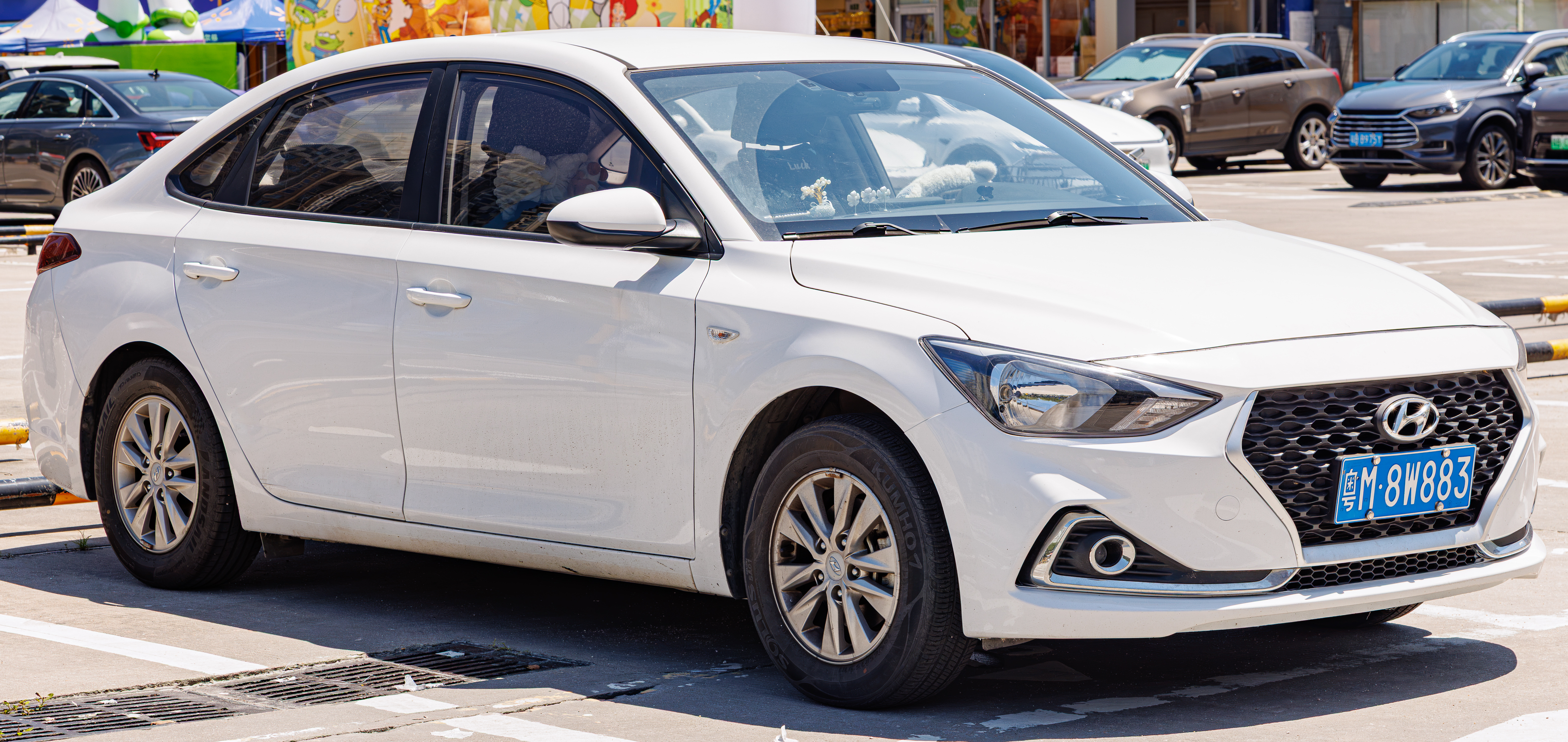
2017–2021
现代悦动
Hyundai Celesta

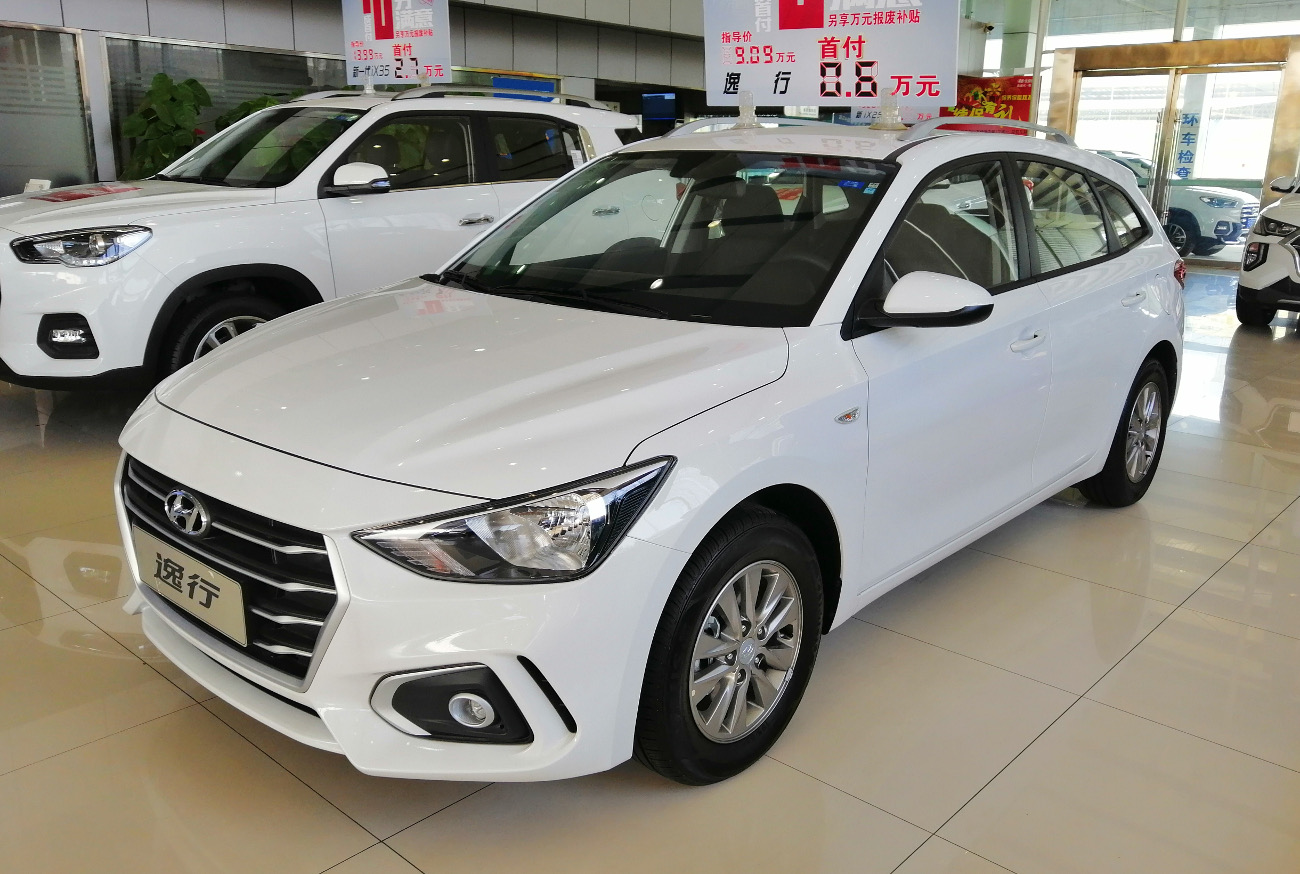
2018–2019
现代逸行
Hyundai Celesta RV

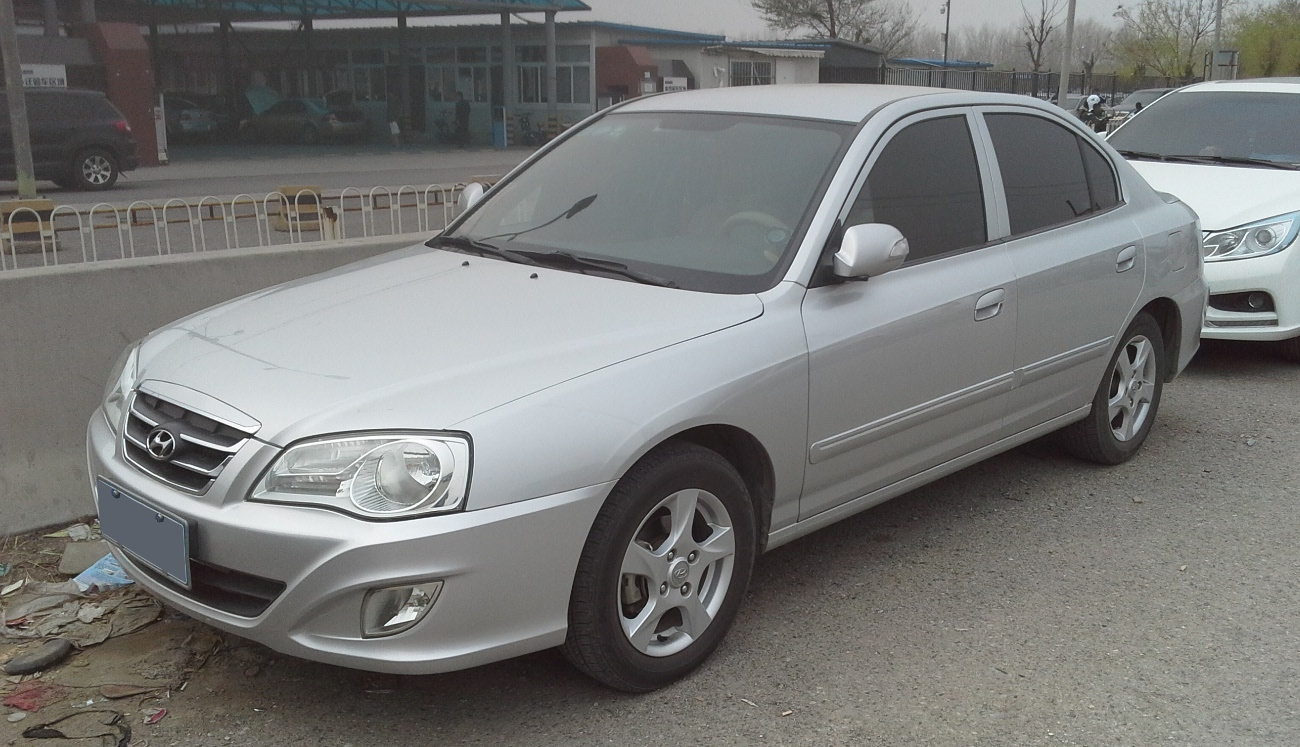
2003–2011
现代伊兰特XD
Hyundai Elantra XD

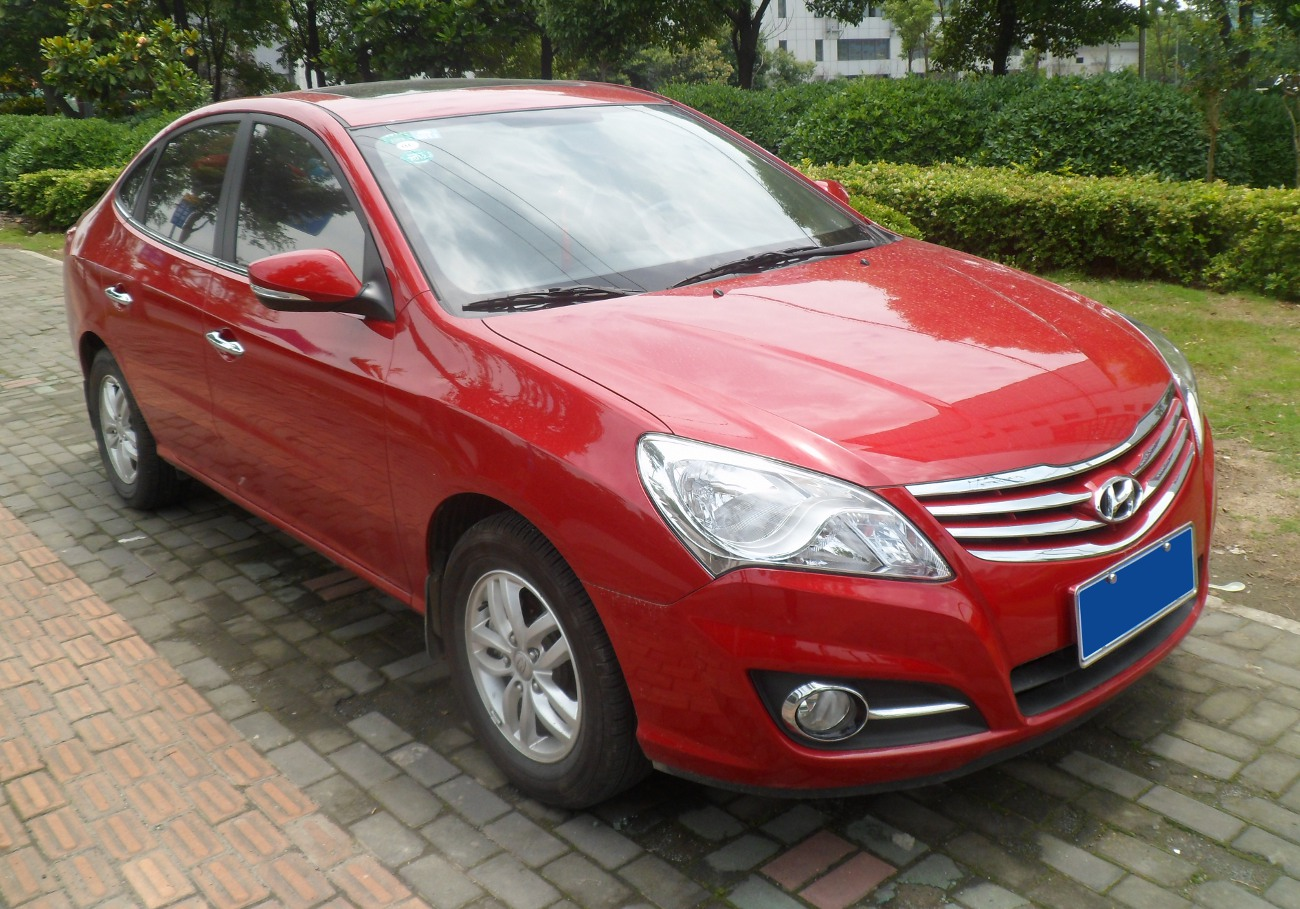
2008–2017
现代伊兰特悦动HD
Hyundai Elantra Yuedong HD

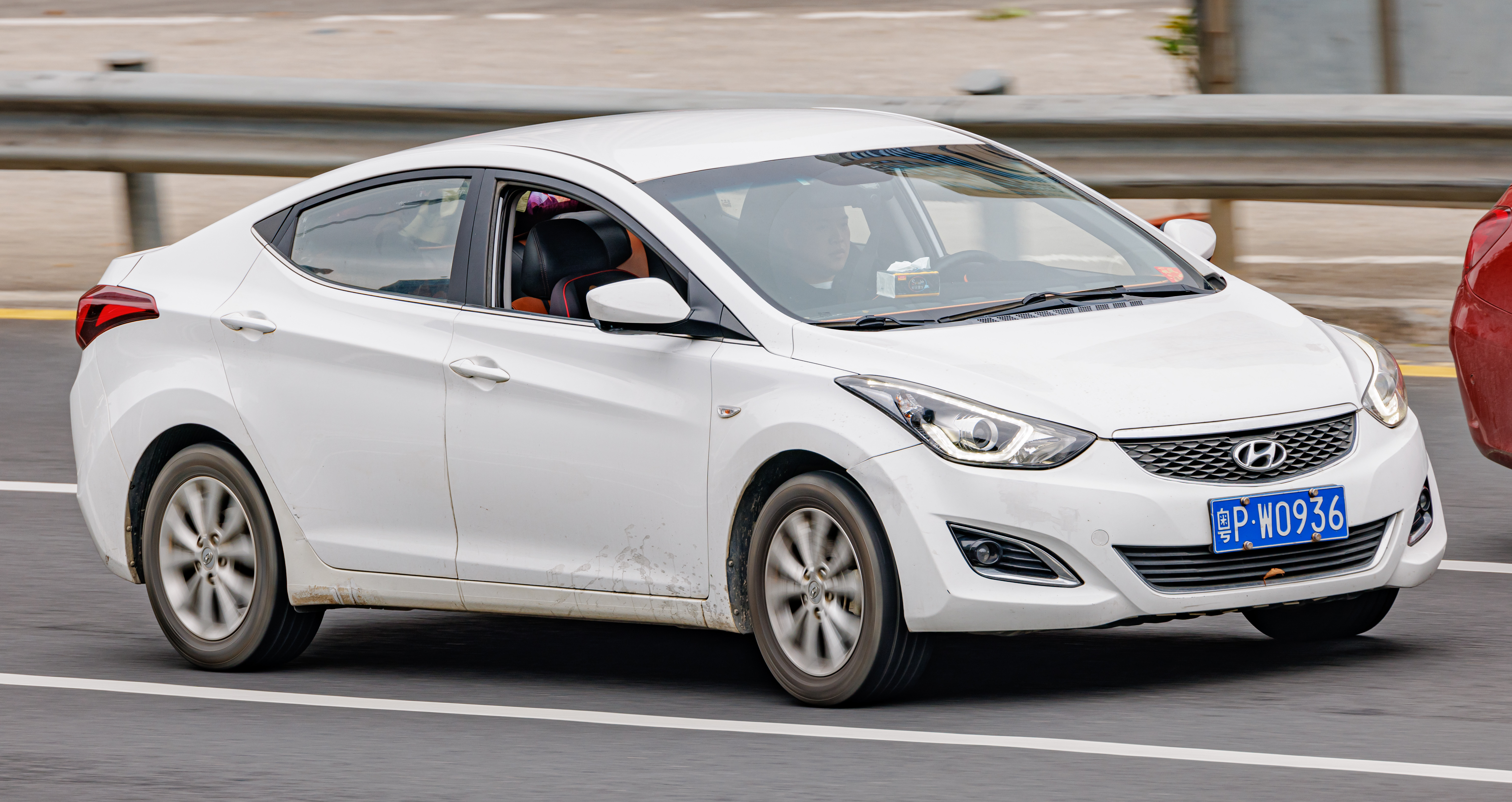
2012–2018
现代伊兰特朗动MD
Hyundai Elantra Langdong MD

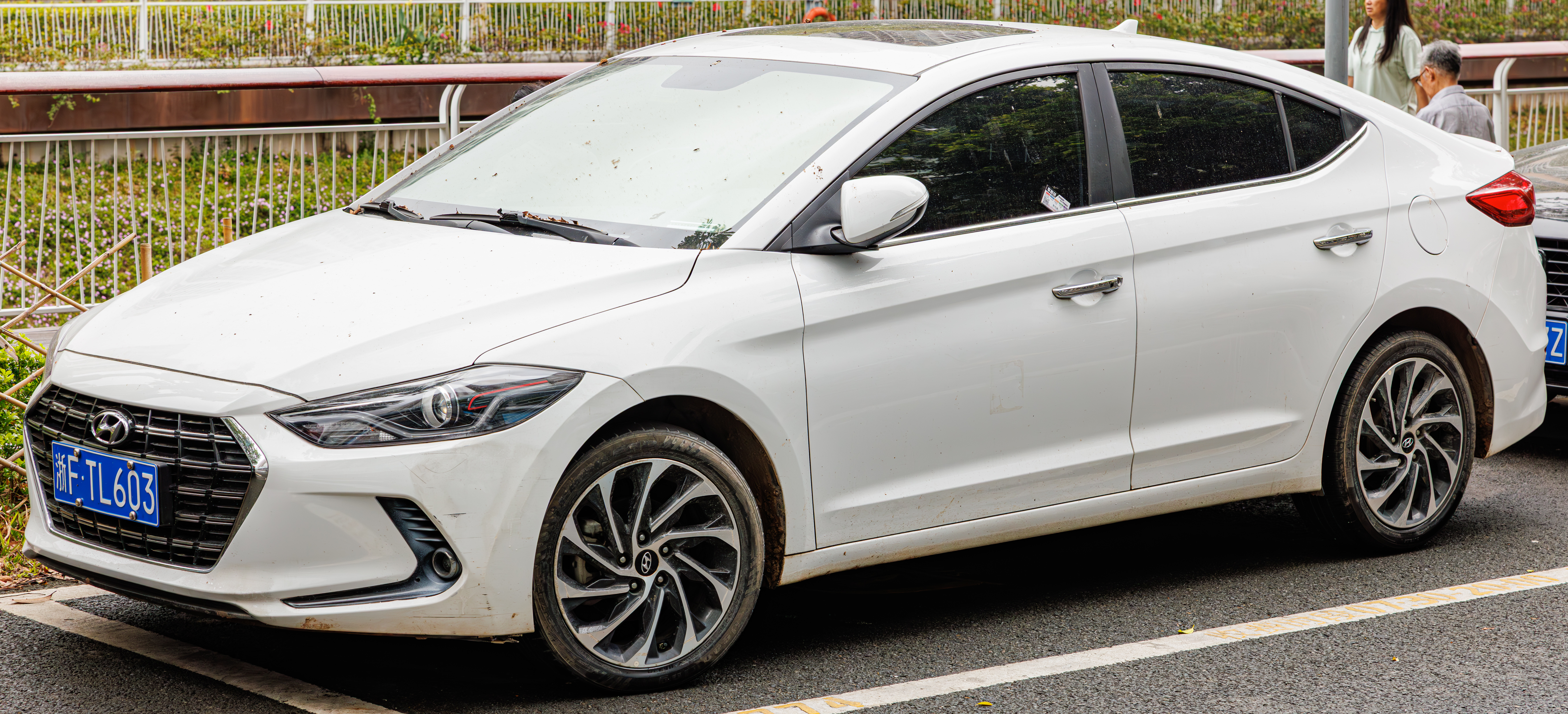
2016–2021
现代伊兰特领动AD
Hyundai Elantra Lingdong AD

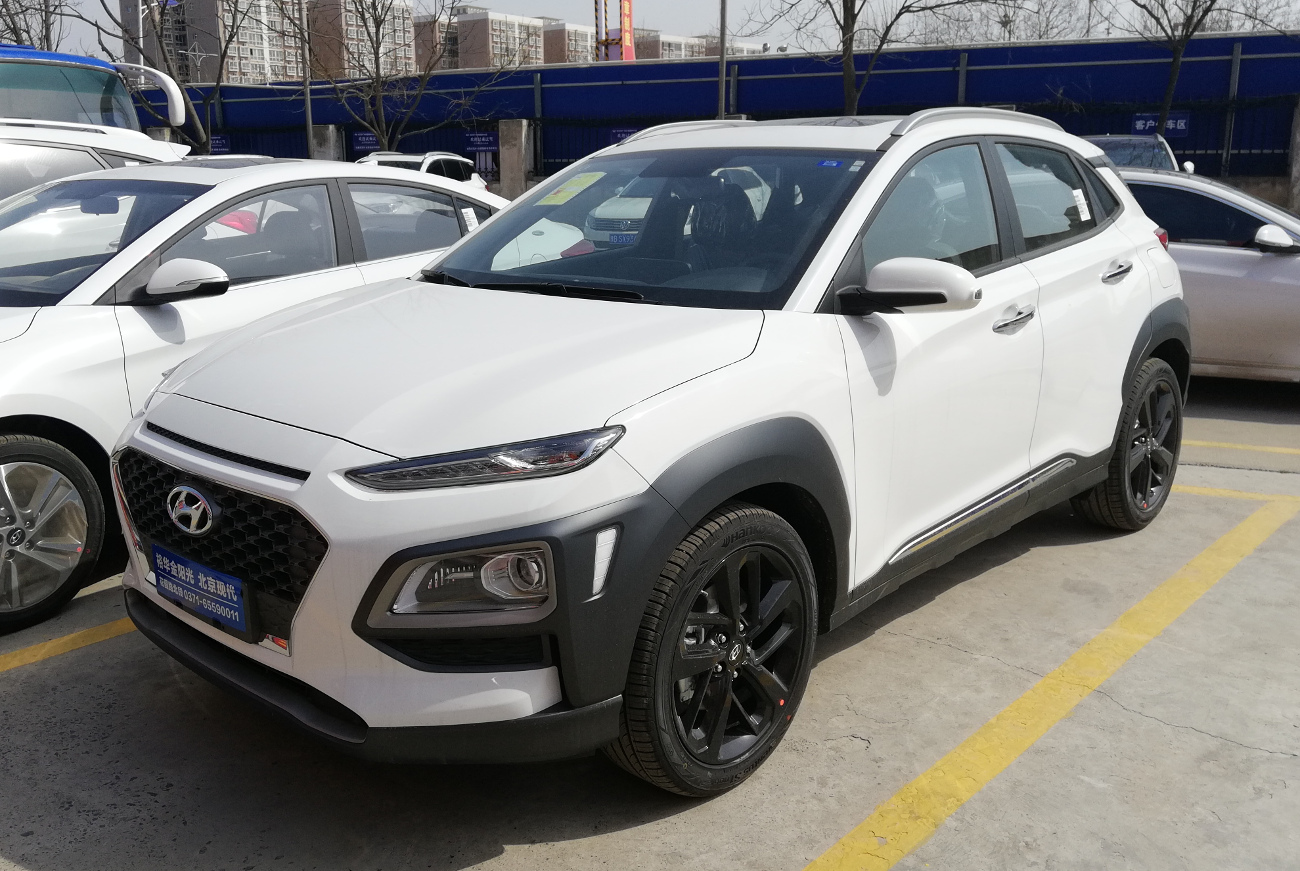
2017–2020
现代昂希诺
Hyundai Encino

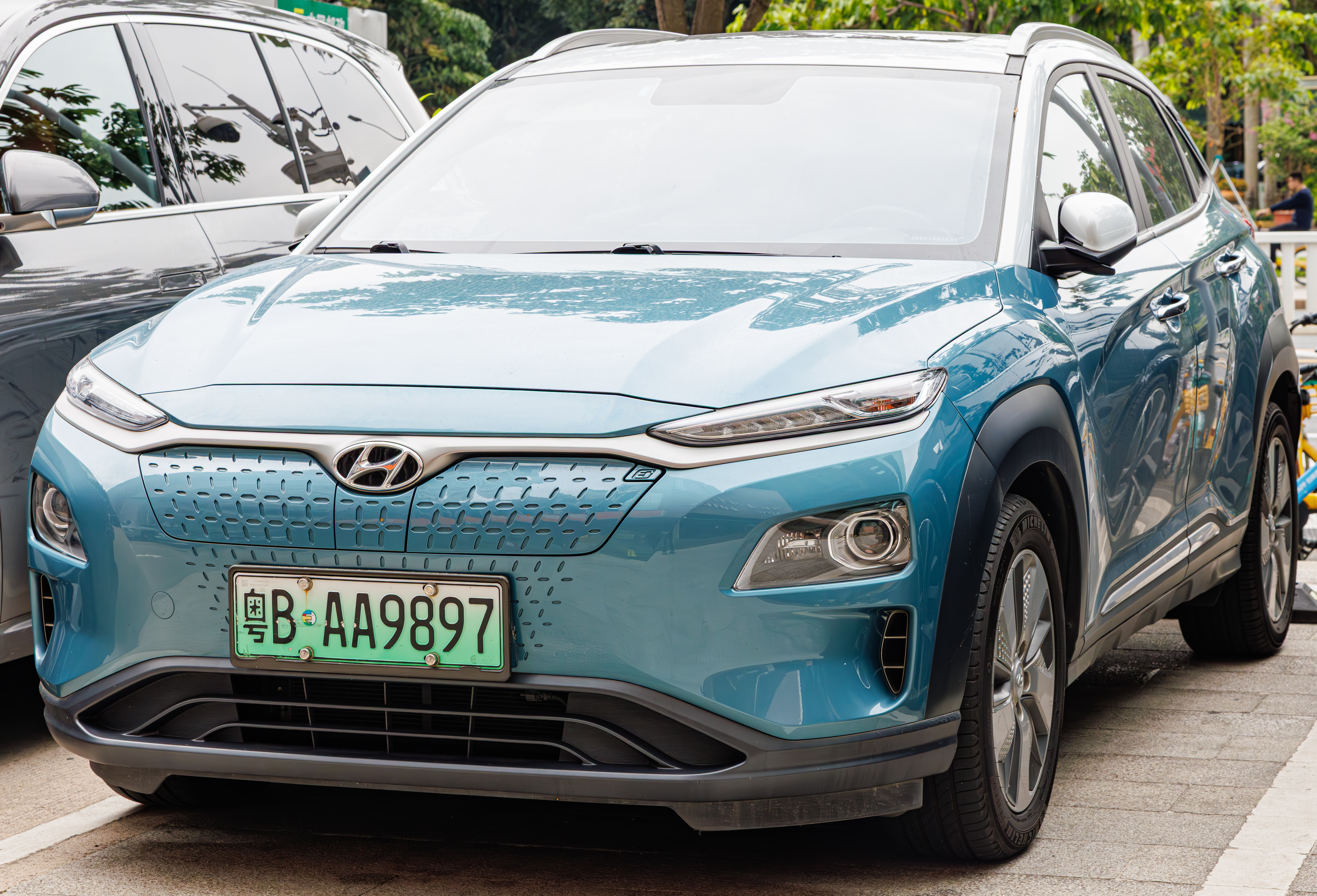
2018–2020
现代昂希诺EV
Hyundai Encino EV

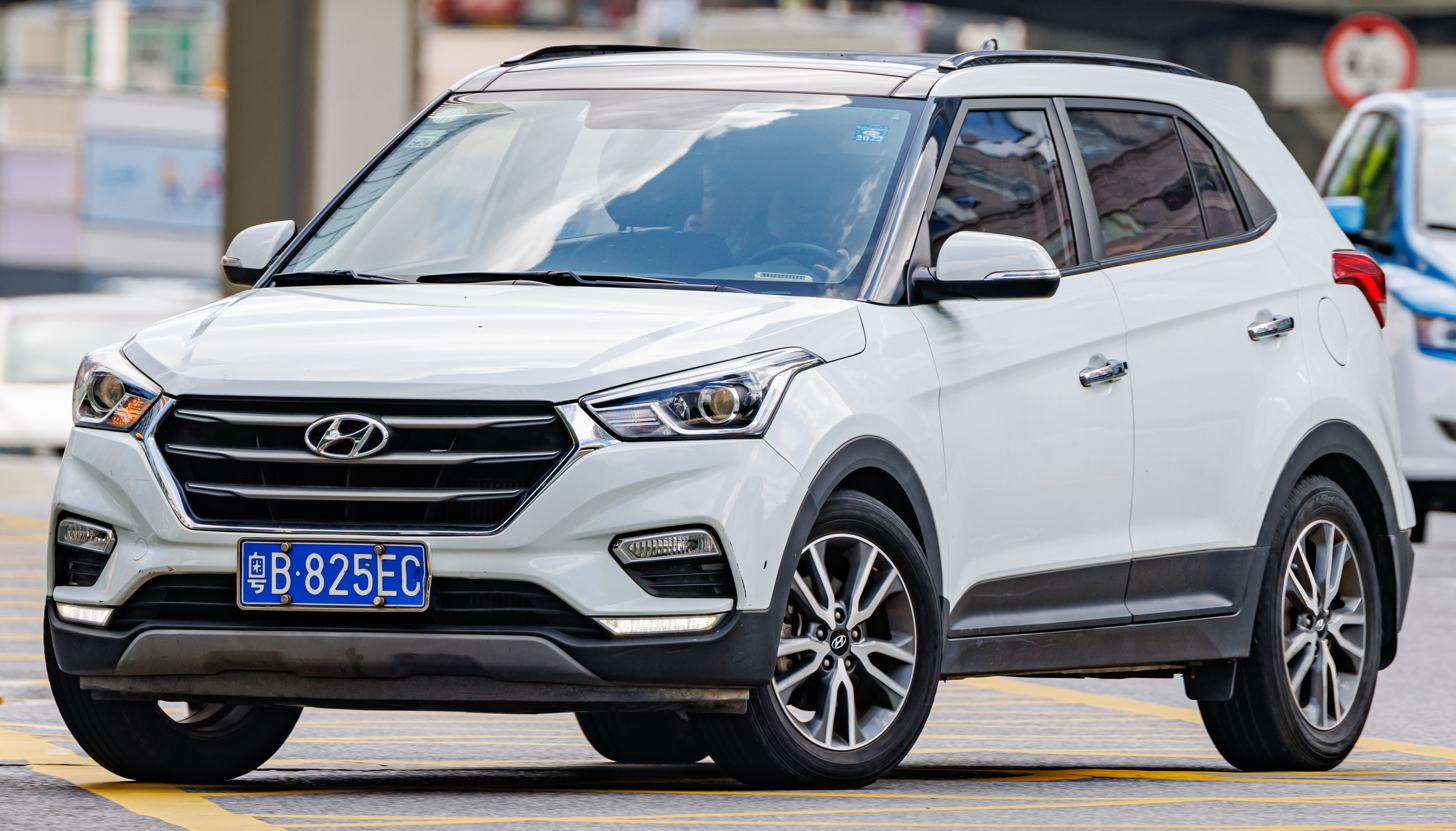
2014–2019
现代ix25
Hyundai ix25 GC

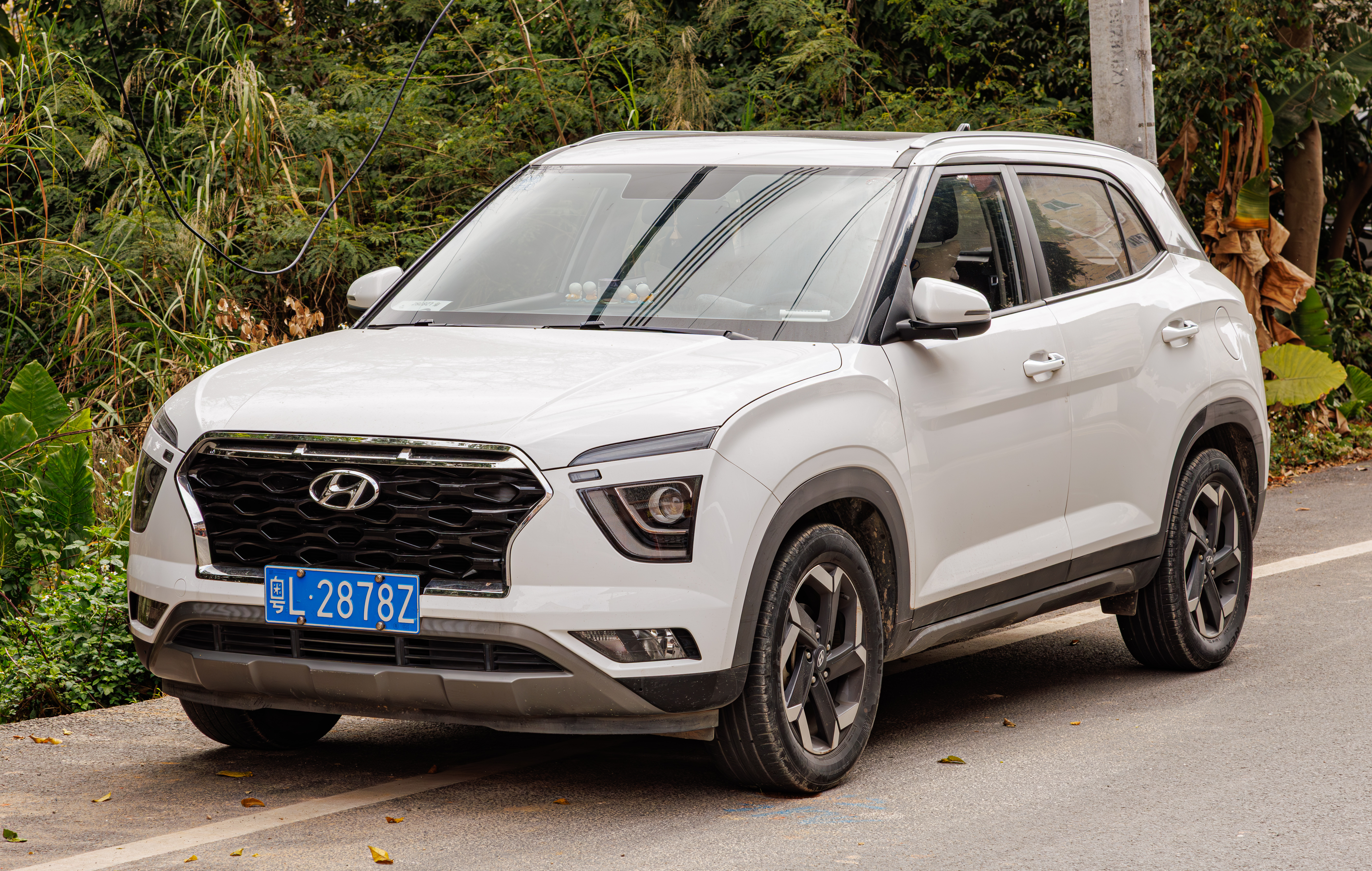
2019–2021
现代ix25
Hyundai ix25 SU2

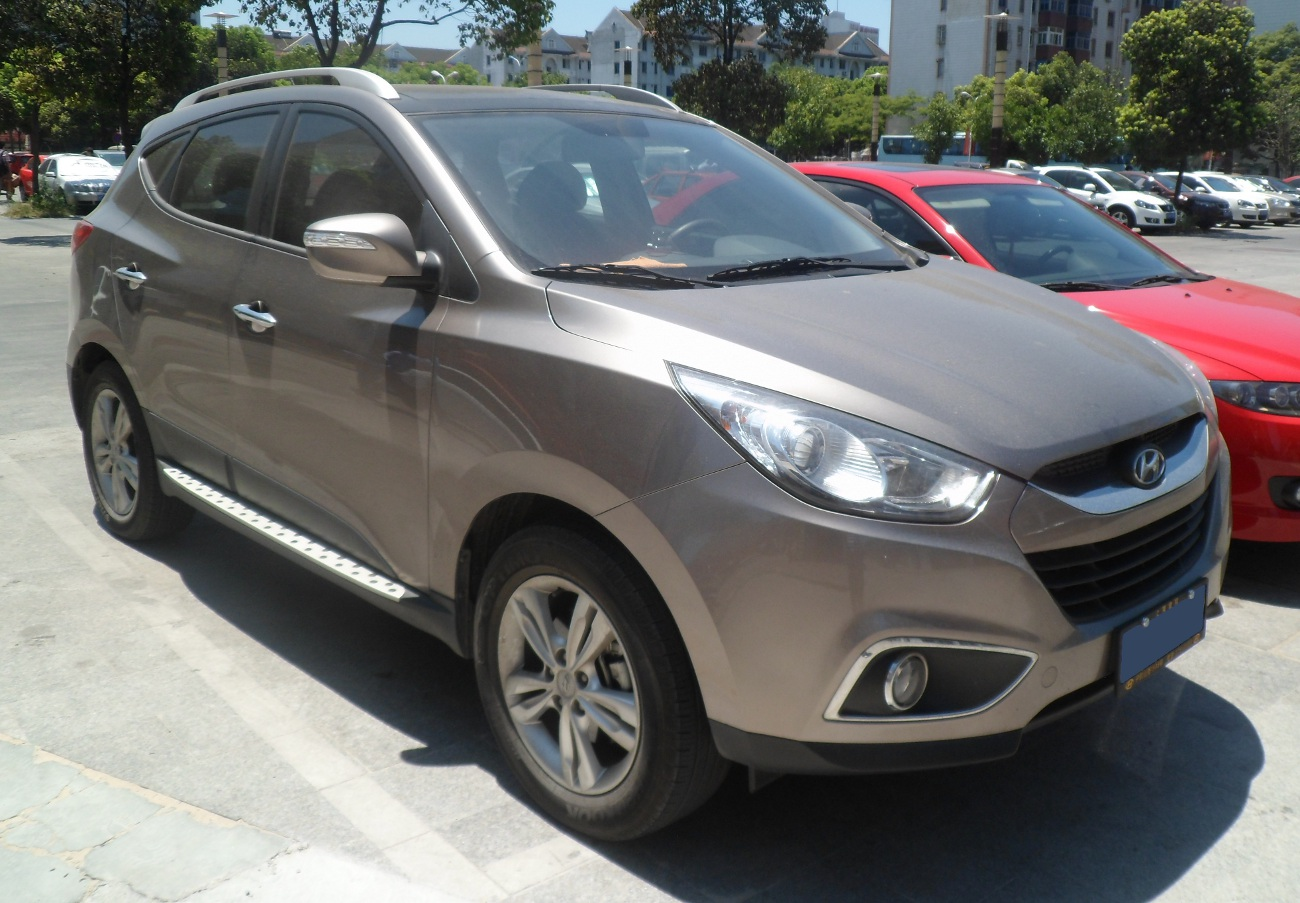
2010–2013
现代ix35
Hyundai ix35

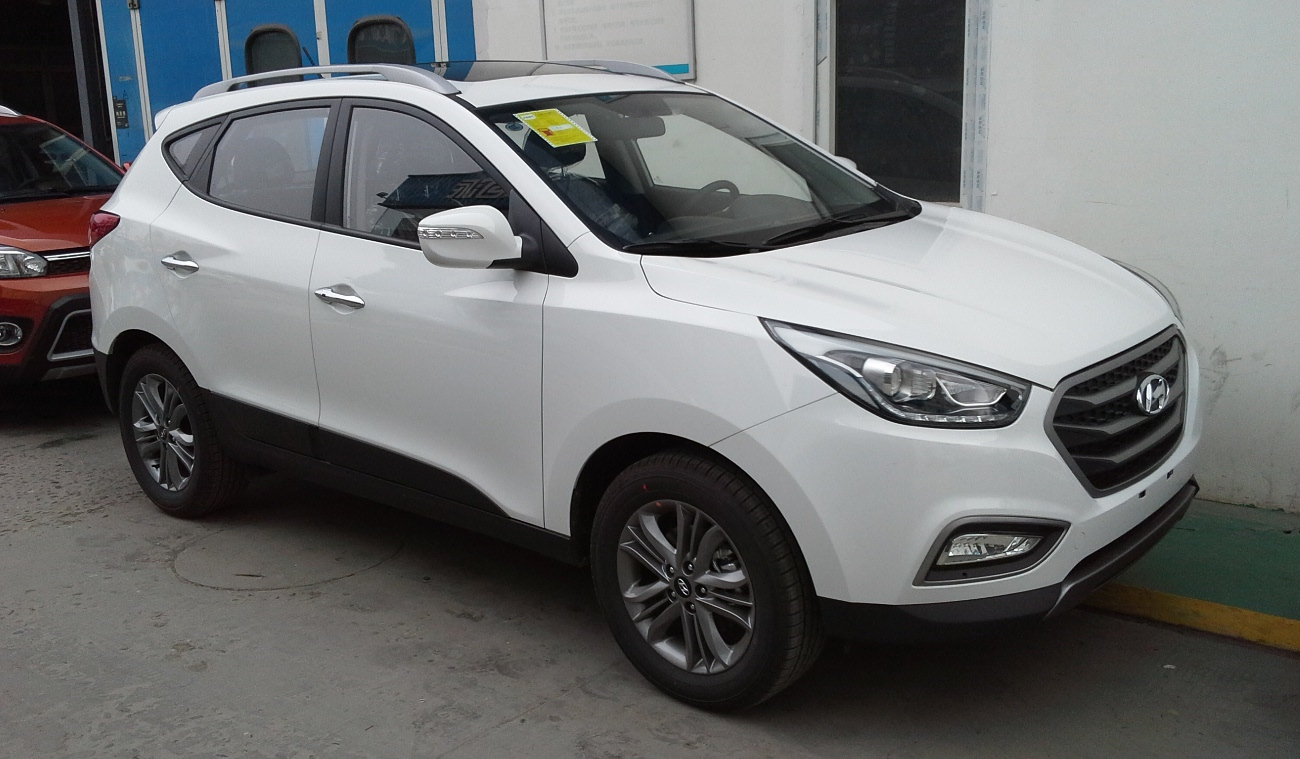
2013–2017
现代ix35
Hyundai ix35

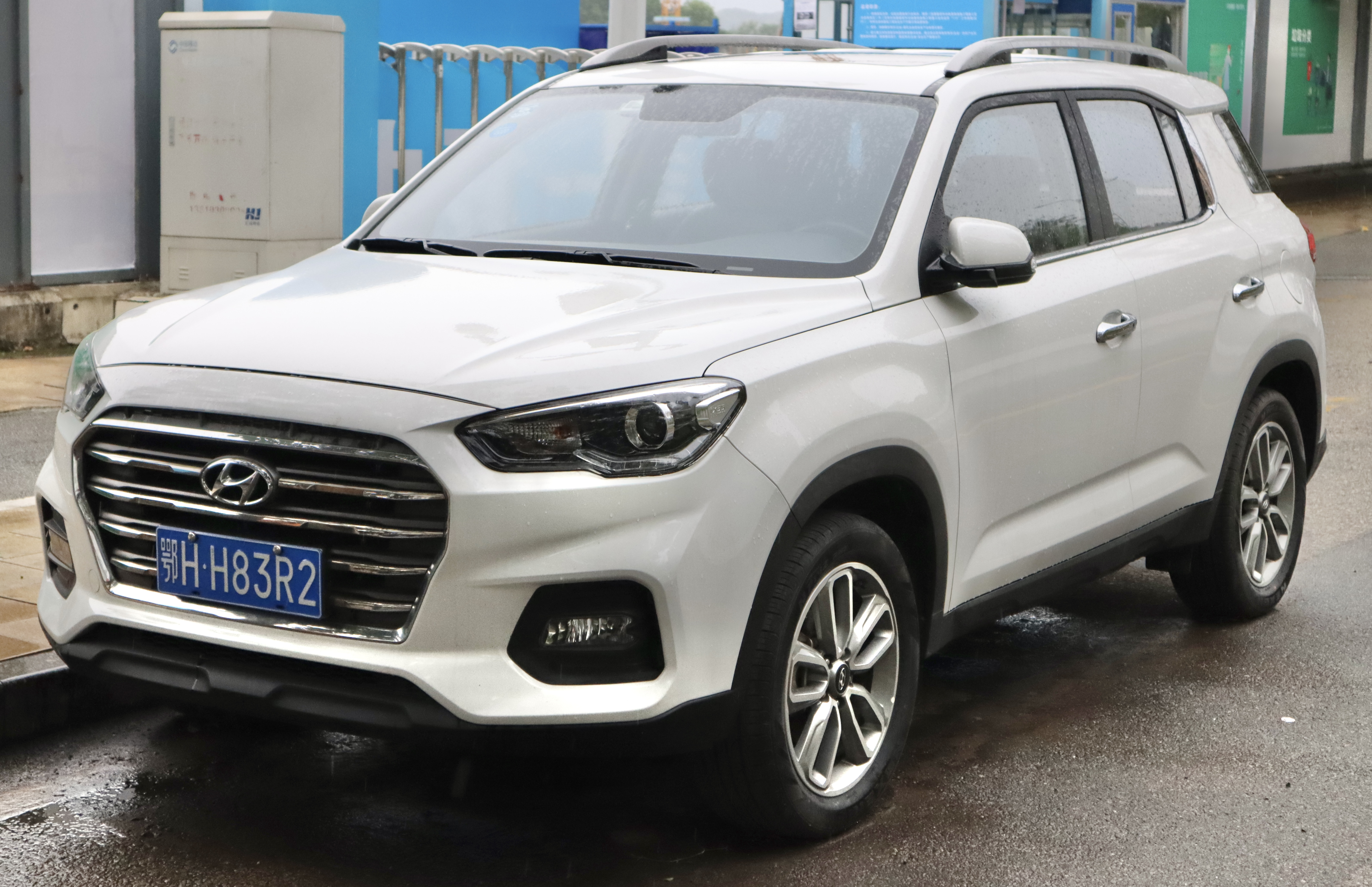
2017–2021
现代ix35
Hyundai ix35 NU

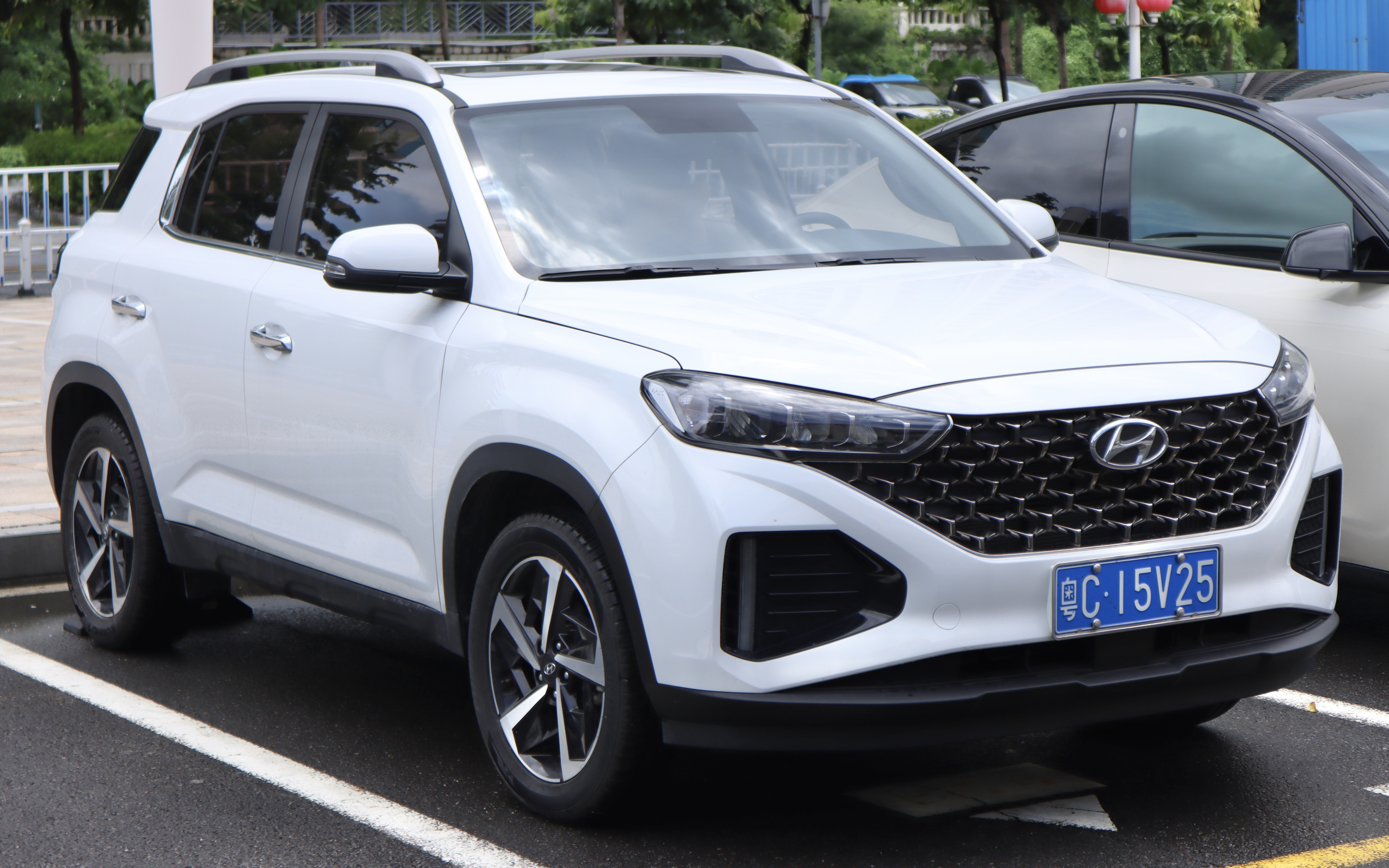
2021–2023
现代ix35
Hyundai ix35 NU

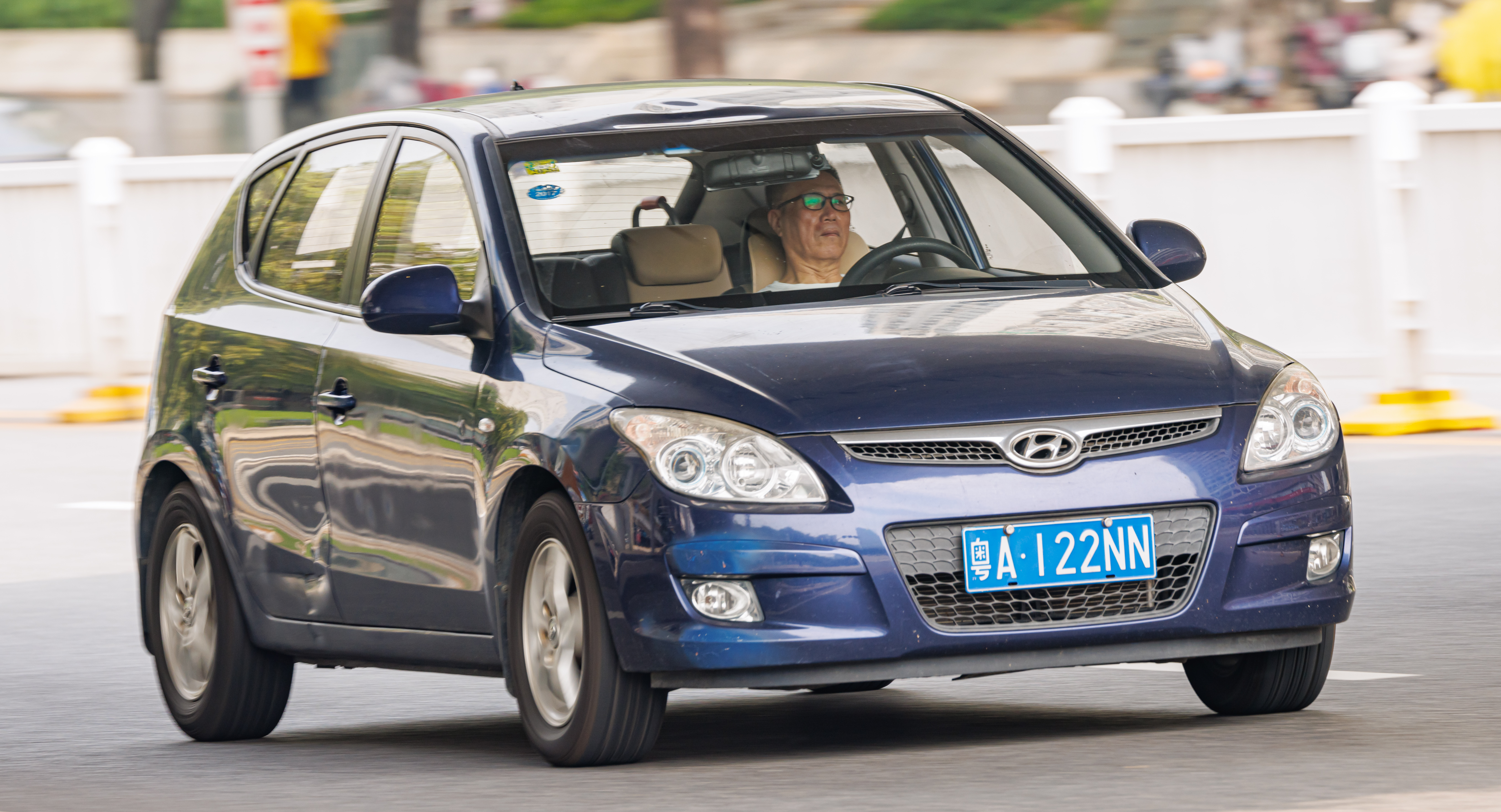
2006–2012
现代i30
Hyundai i30

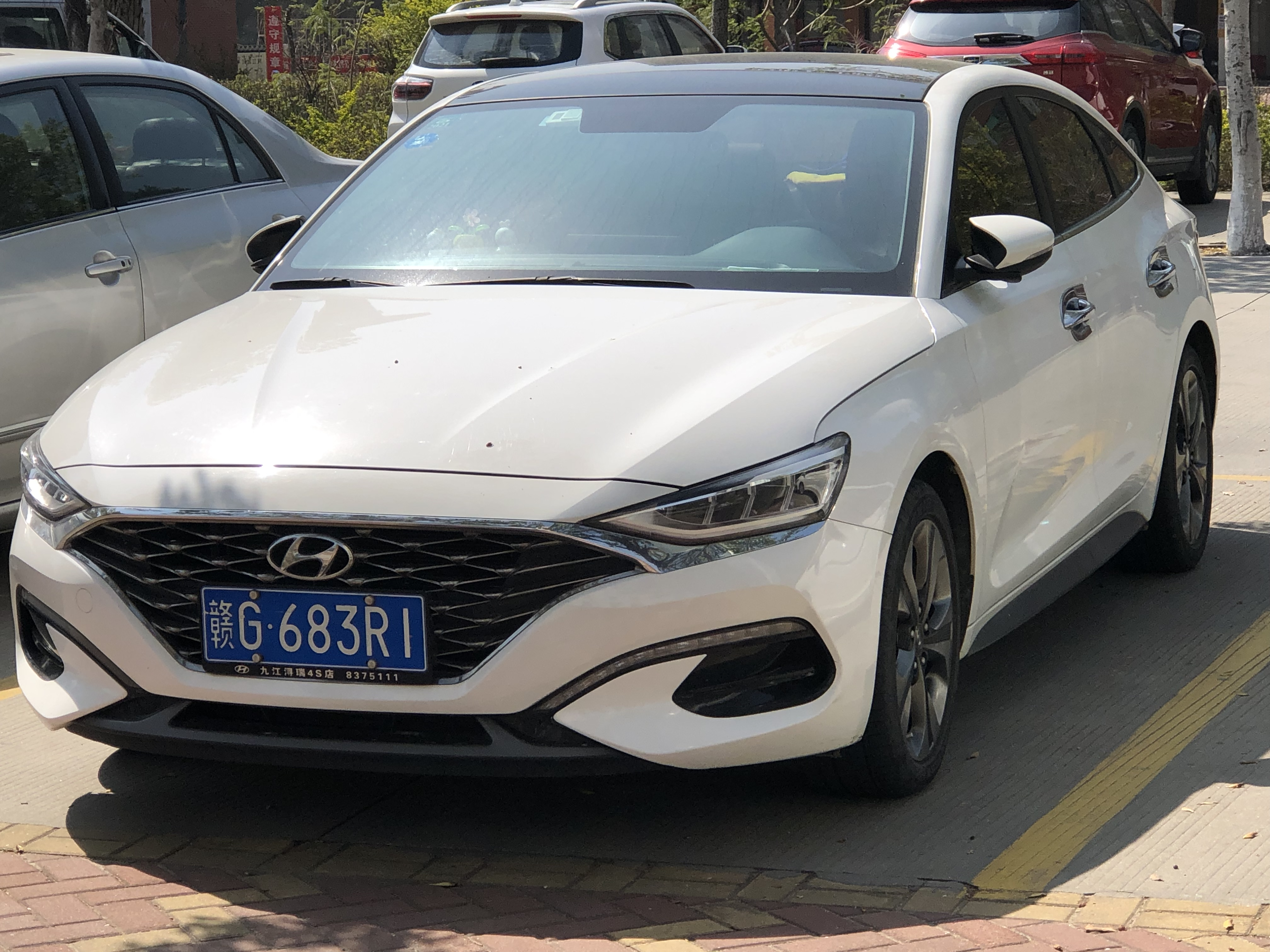
2018–2025
现代菲斯塔
Hyundai Lafesta

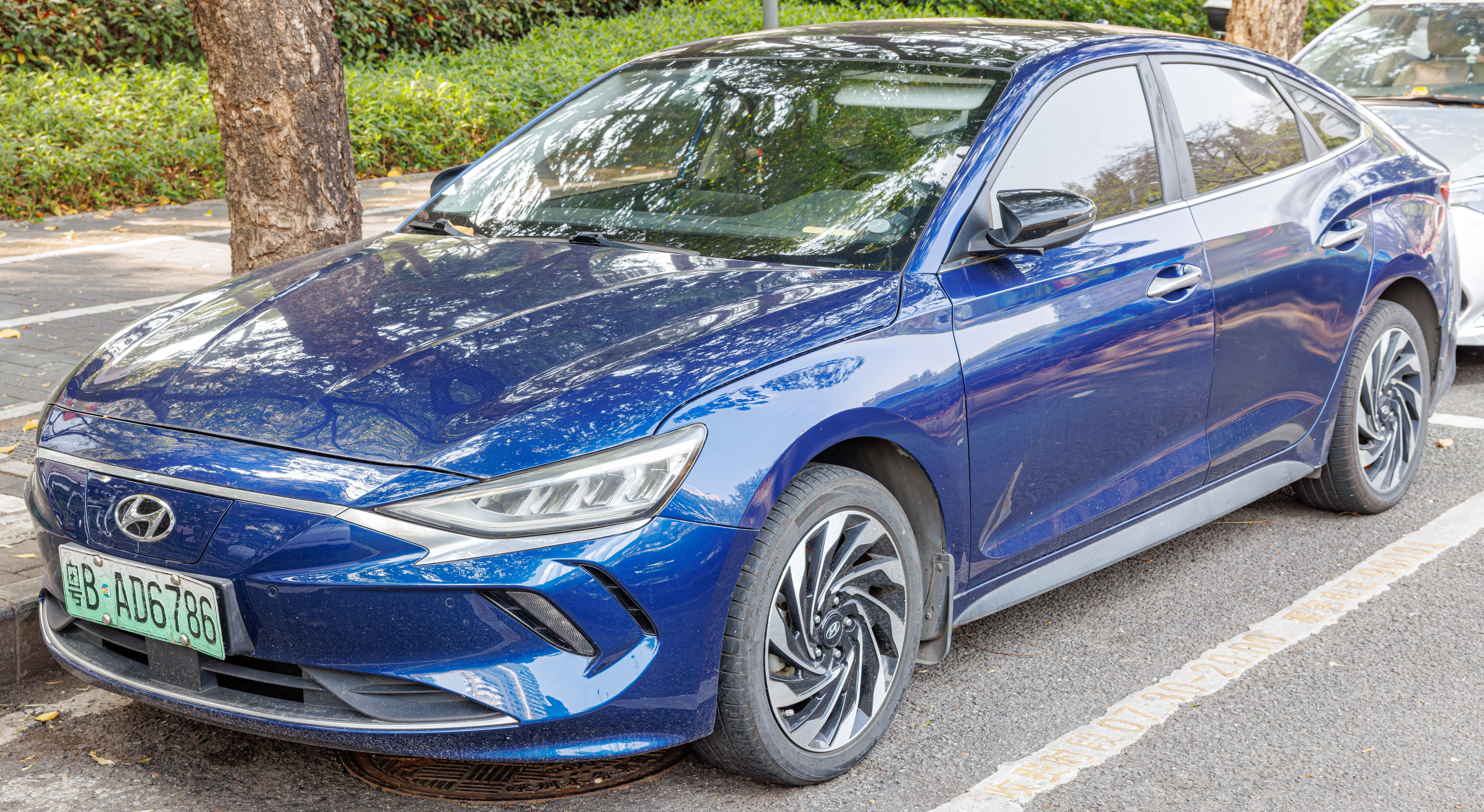
2019–2022
现代菲斯塔EV
Hyundai Lafesta EV

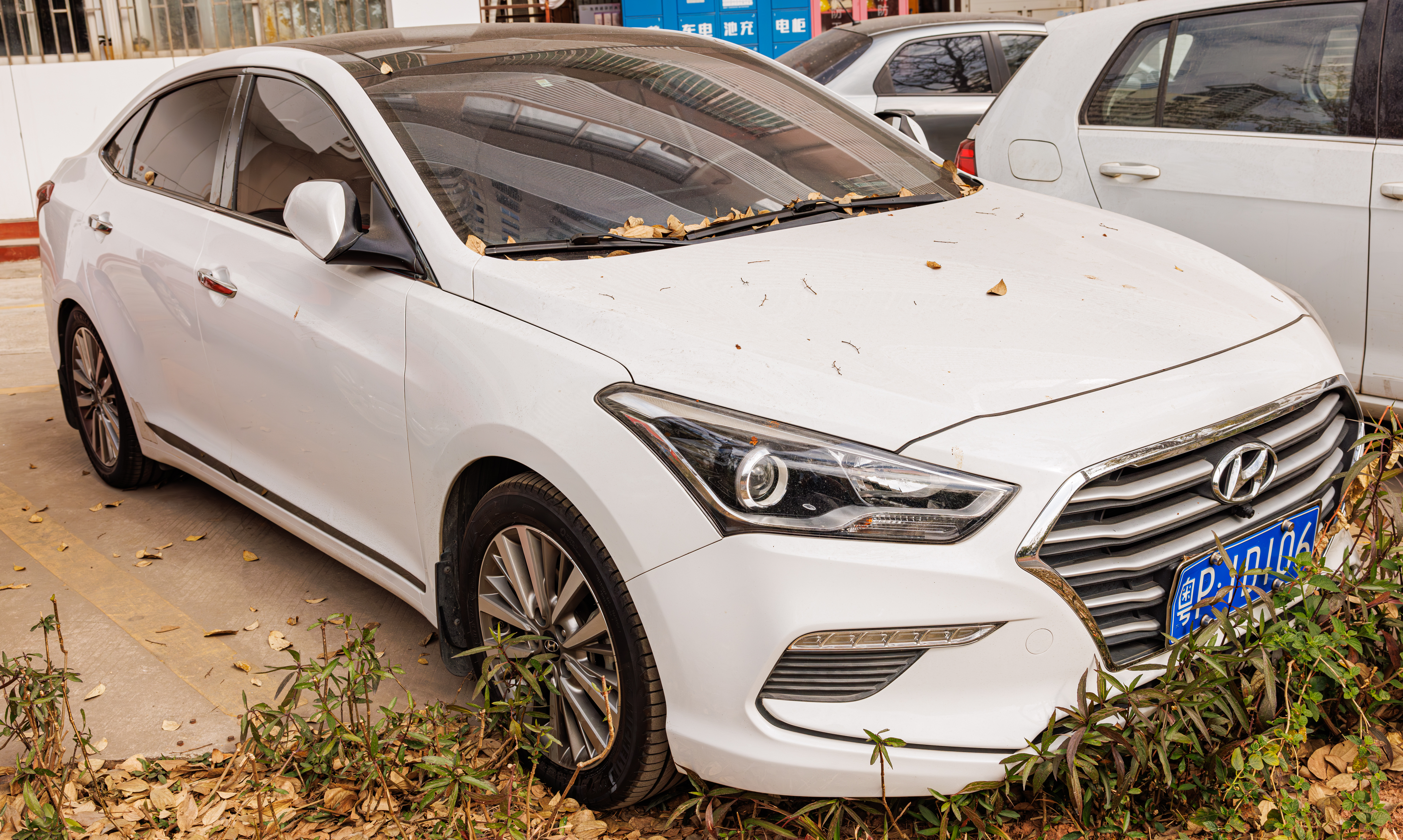
2013–2020
现代名图CF
Hyundai Mistra CF

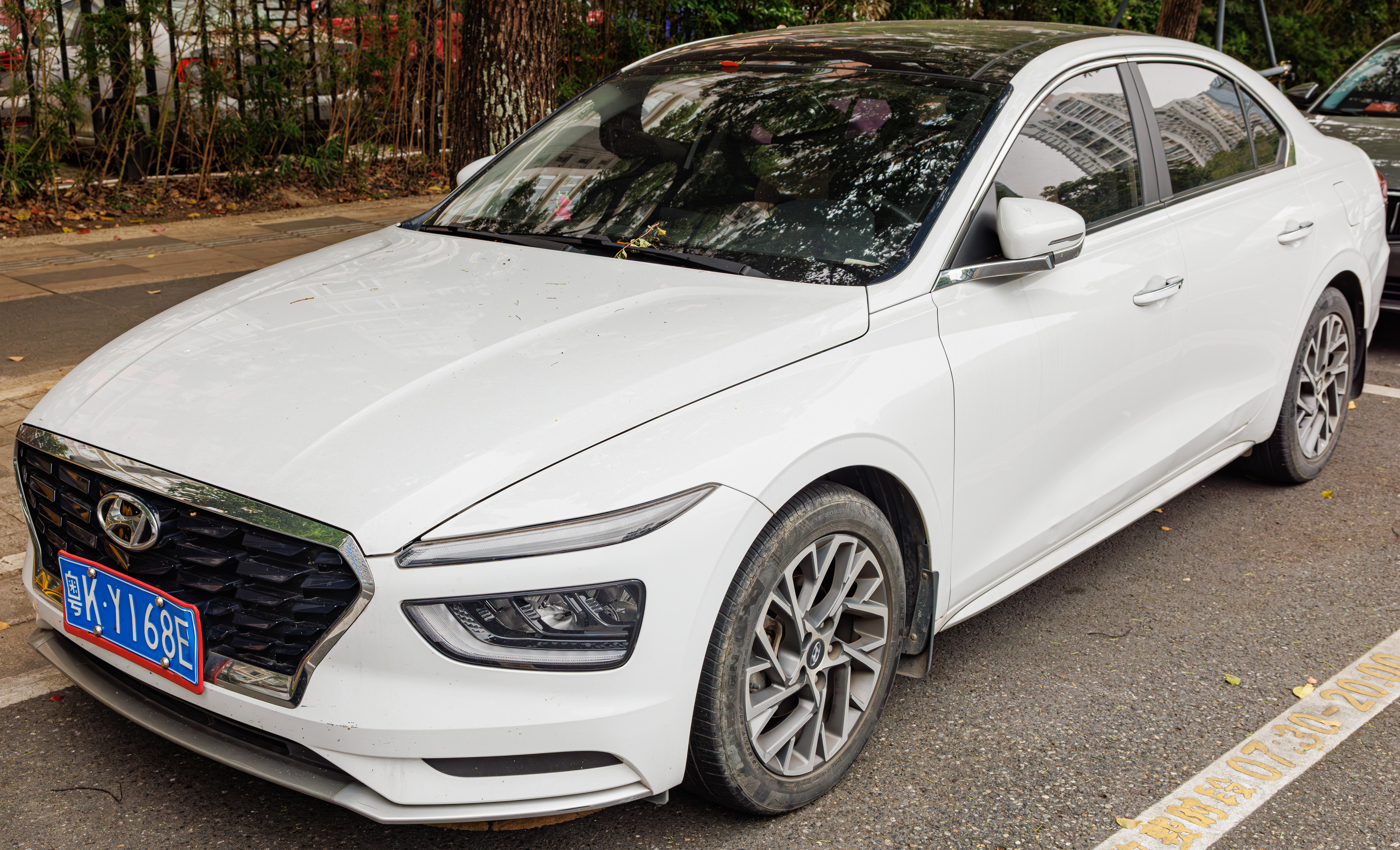
2020–2023
现代名图DU2
Hyundai Mistra DU2

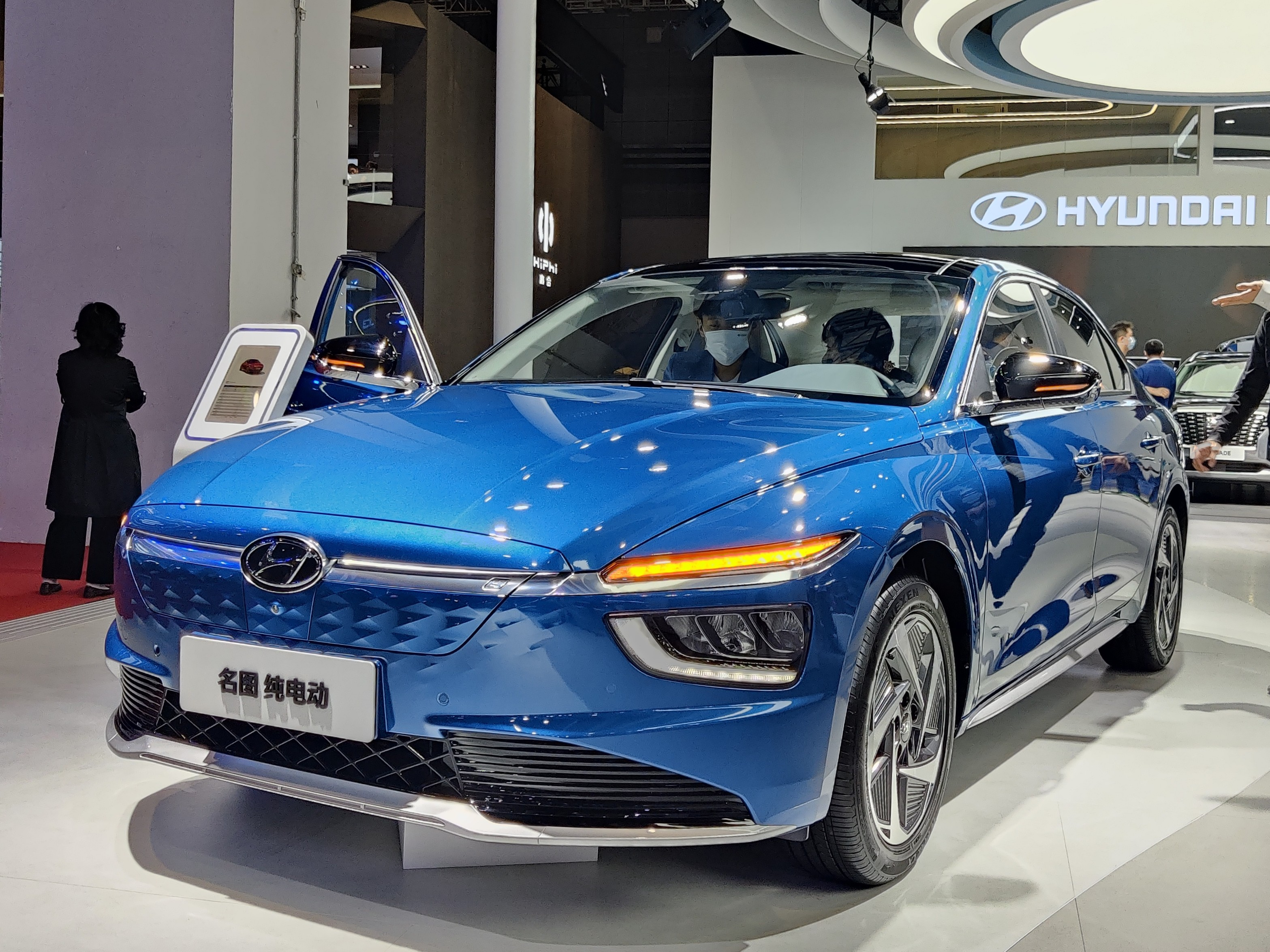
2020–2022
现代名图EV
Hyundai Mistra EV

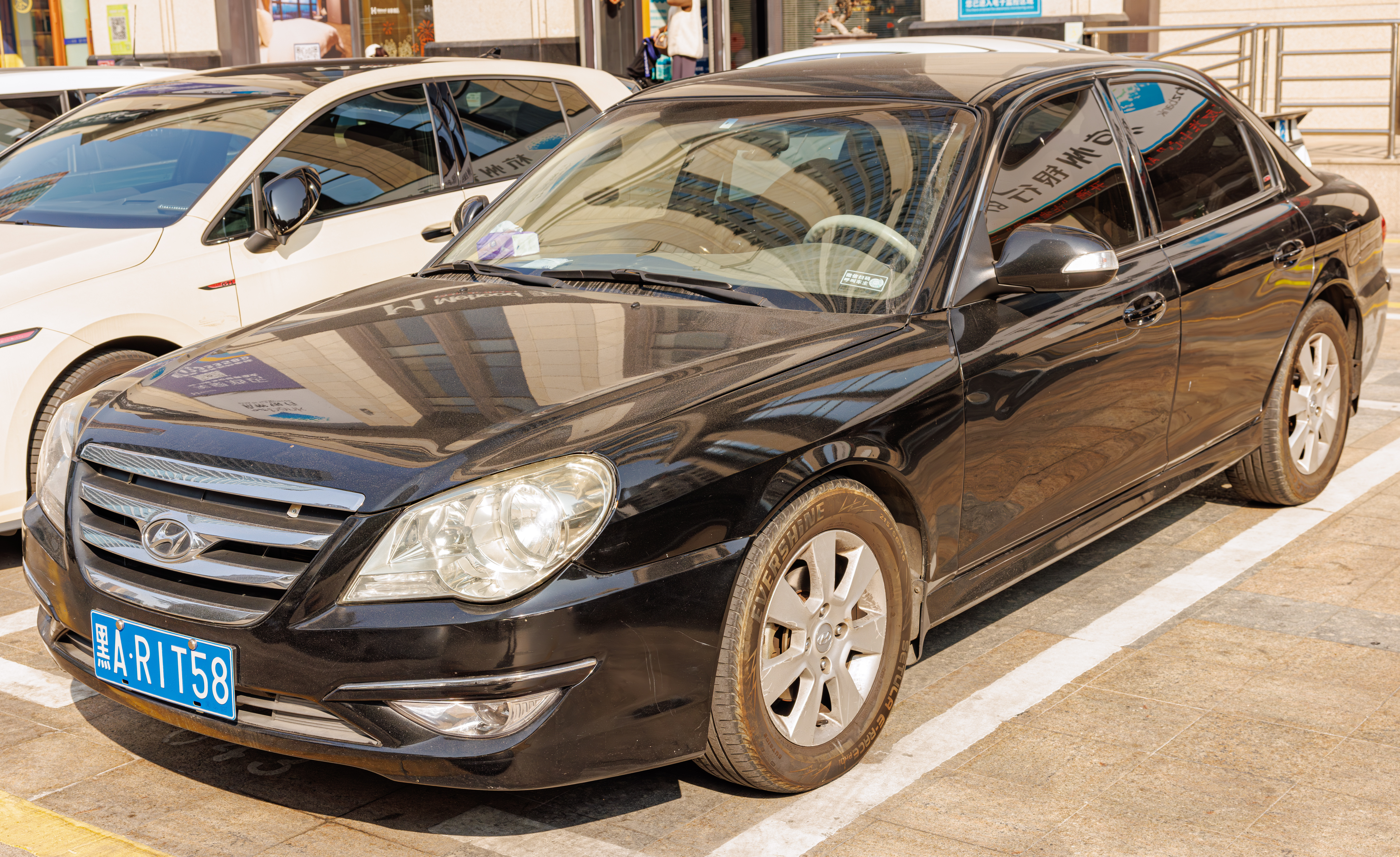
2009–2017
现代名驭
Hyundai Moinca

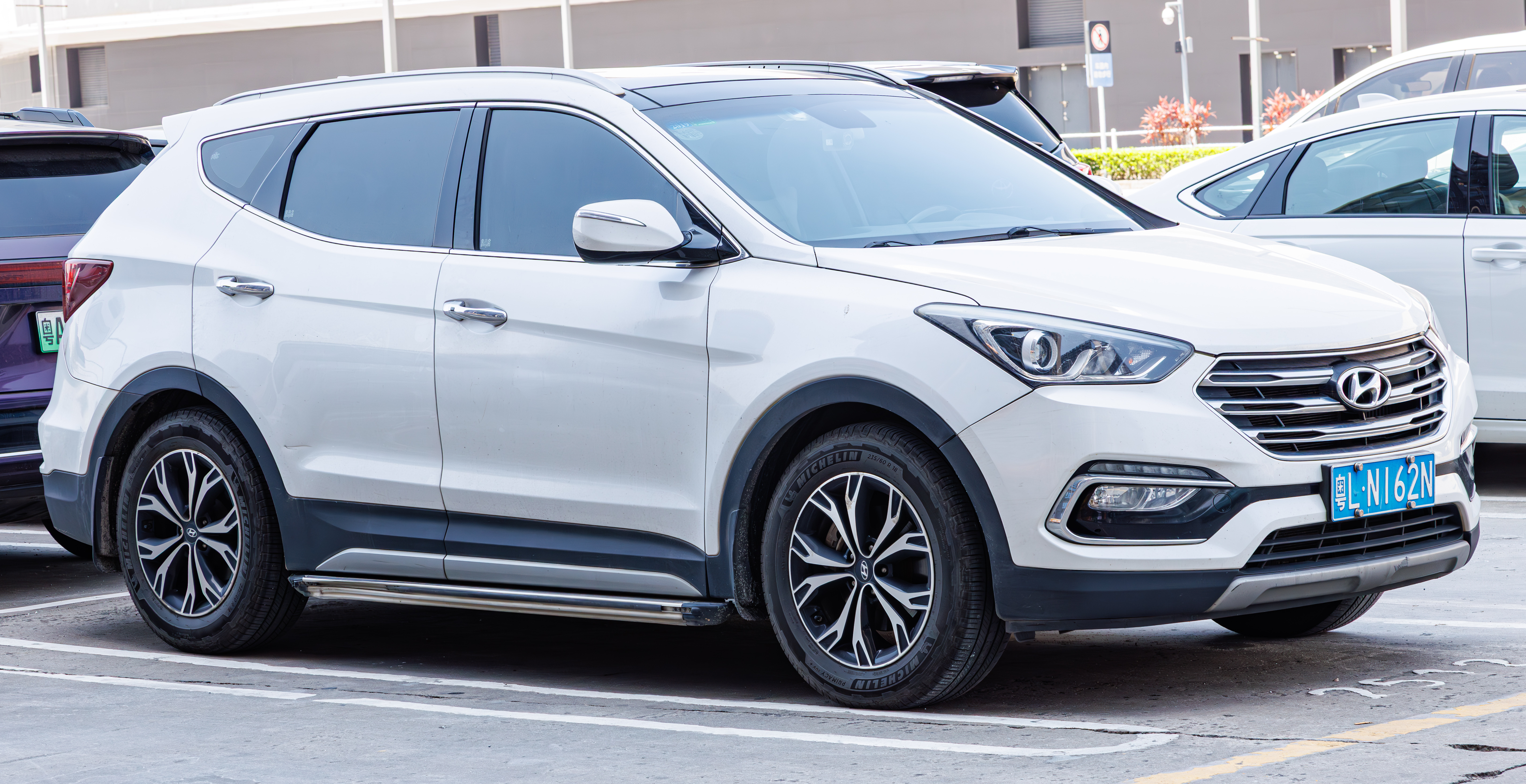
2012–2019
现代胜达DM
Hyundai Santa Fe DM

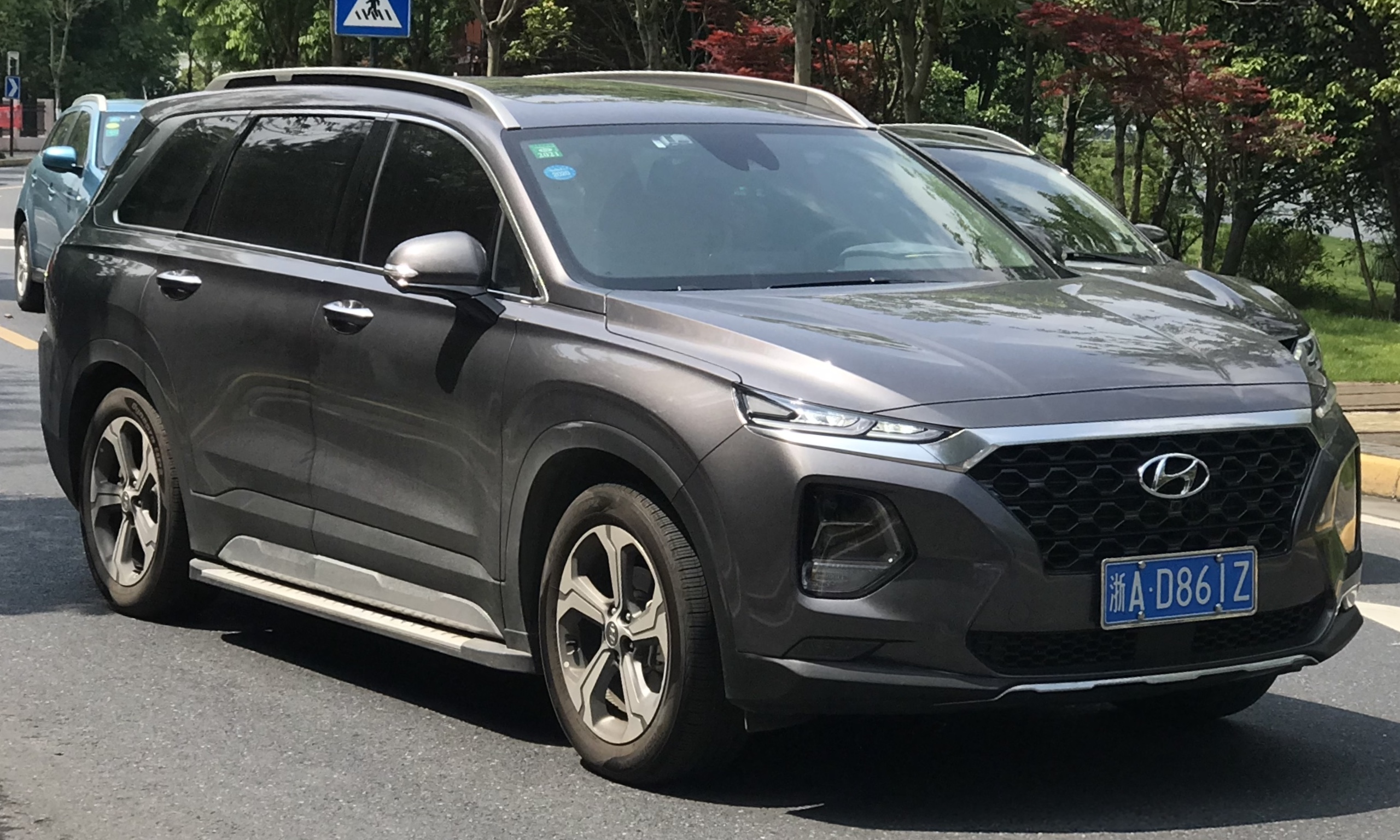
2019–2022
现代胜达TM
Hyundai Santa Fe TM

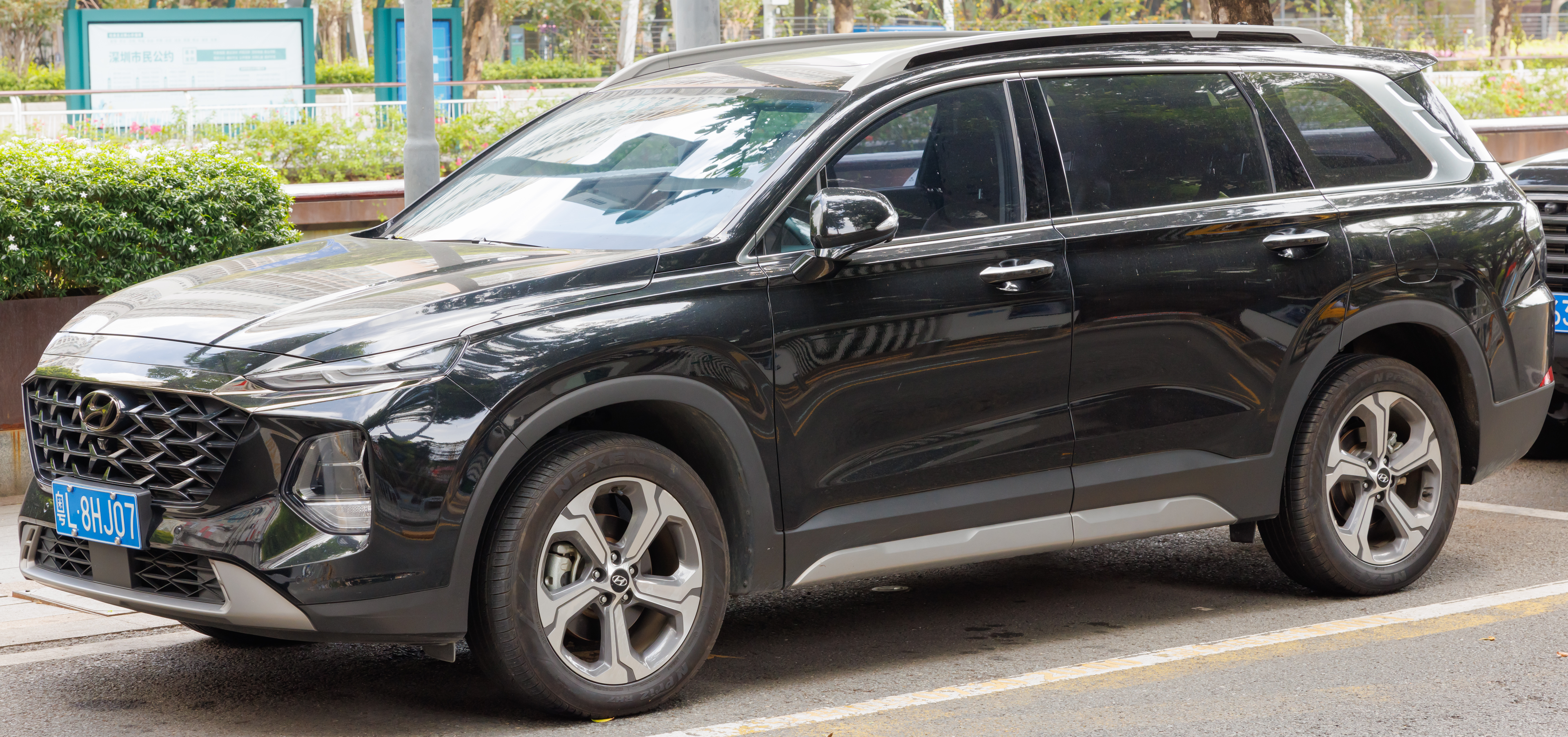
2022–2025
现代胜达TM
Hyundai Santa Fe TM

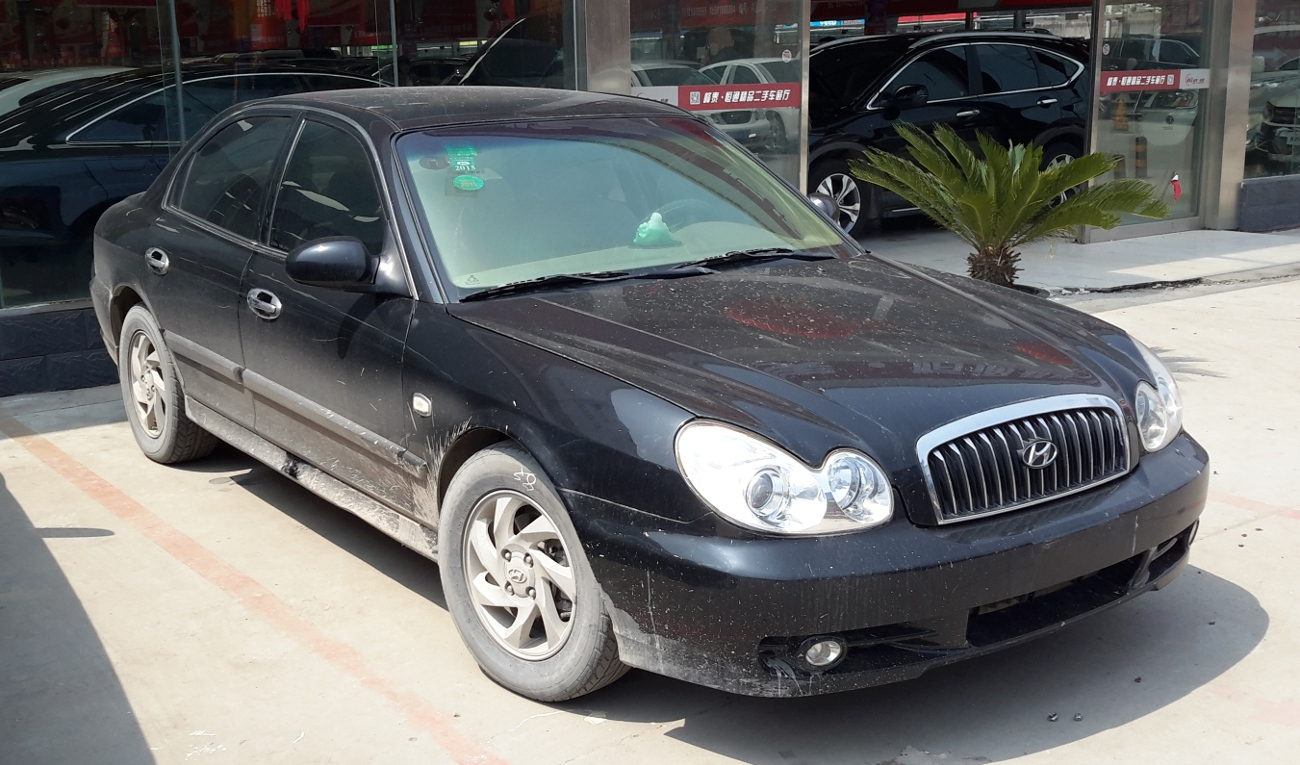
2002–2004
现代索纳塔EF
Hyundai Sonata EF

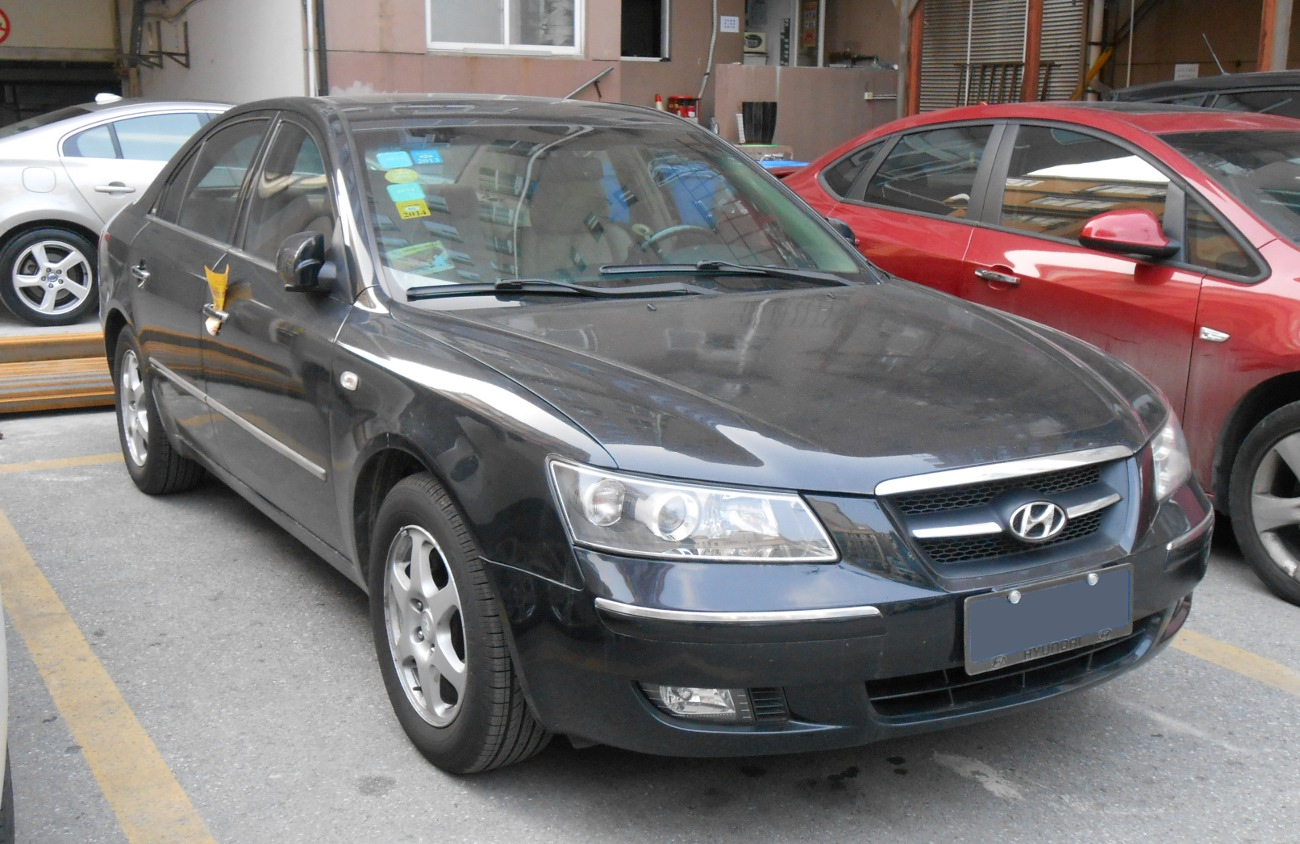
2005–2008
现代索纳塔NF
Hyundai Sonata NF

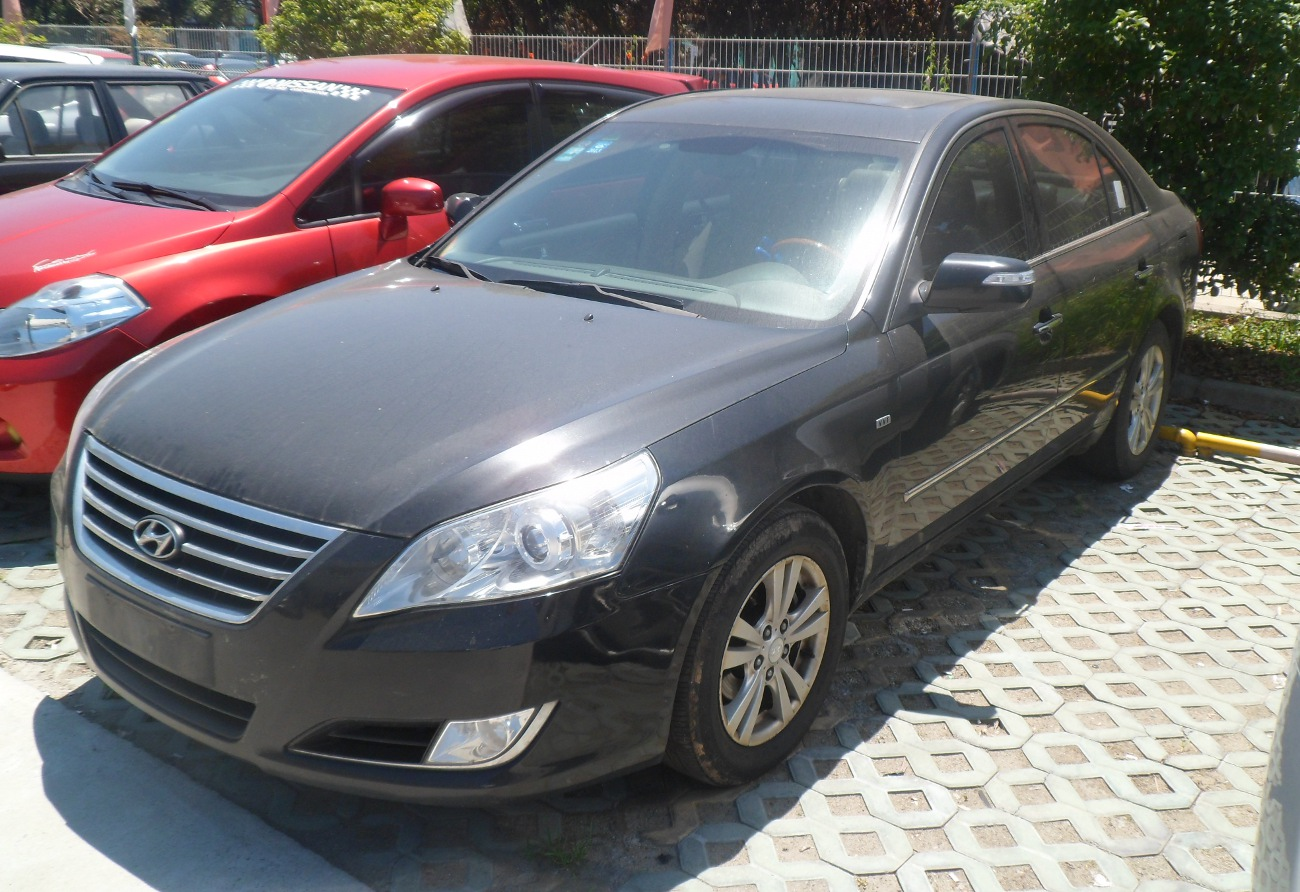
2008–2011
现代索纳塔菱翔
Hyundai Sonata Lingxiang NFC

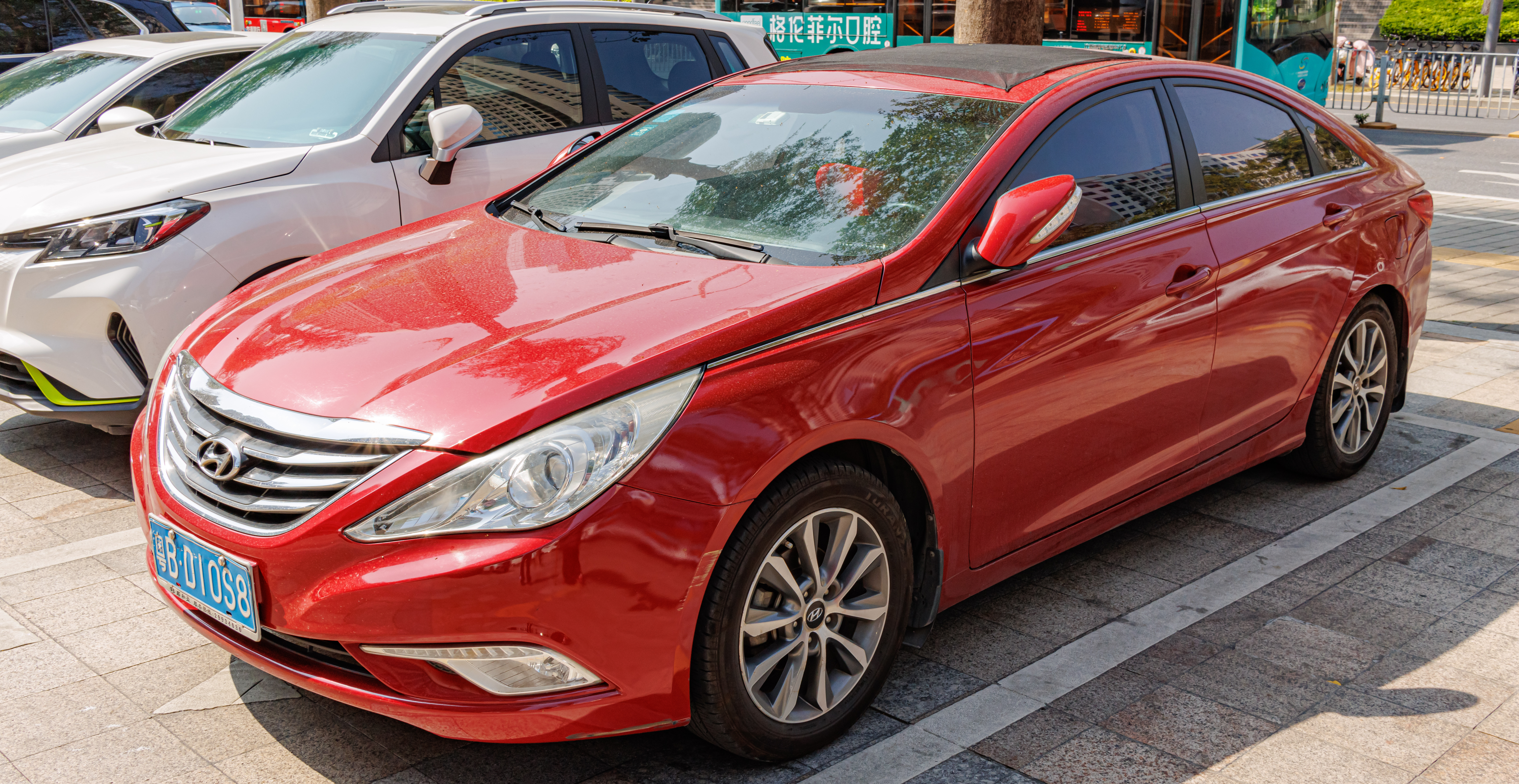
2011–2015
现代索纳塔YF
Hyundai Sonata YF

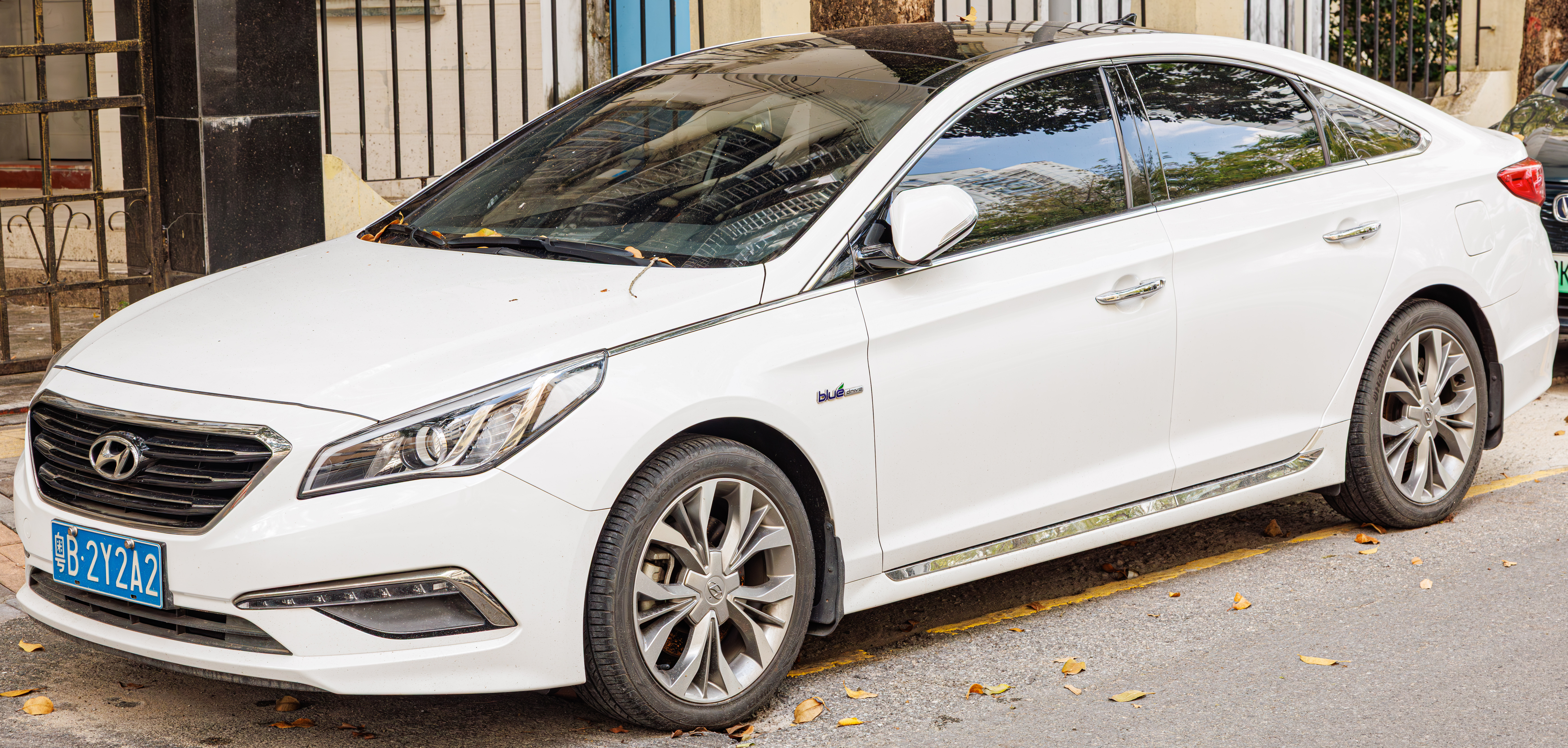
2015–2020
现代索纳塔LF
Hyundai Sonata LF

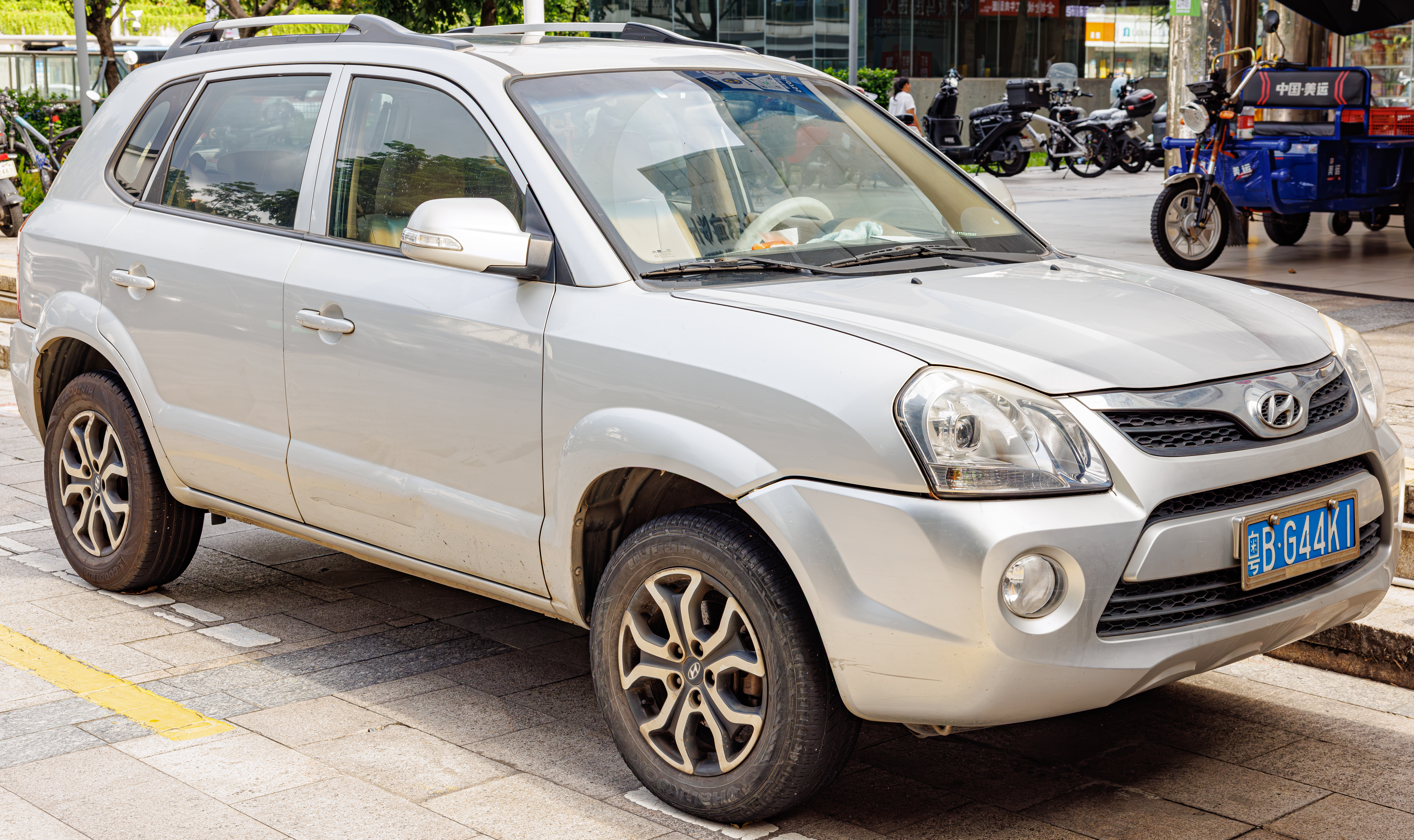
2005–2015
现代途胜JM
Hyundai Tucson JM

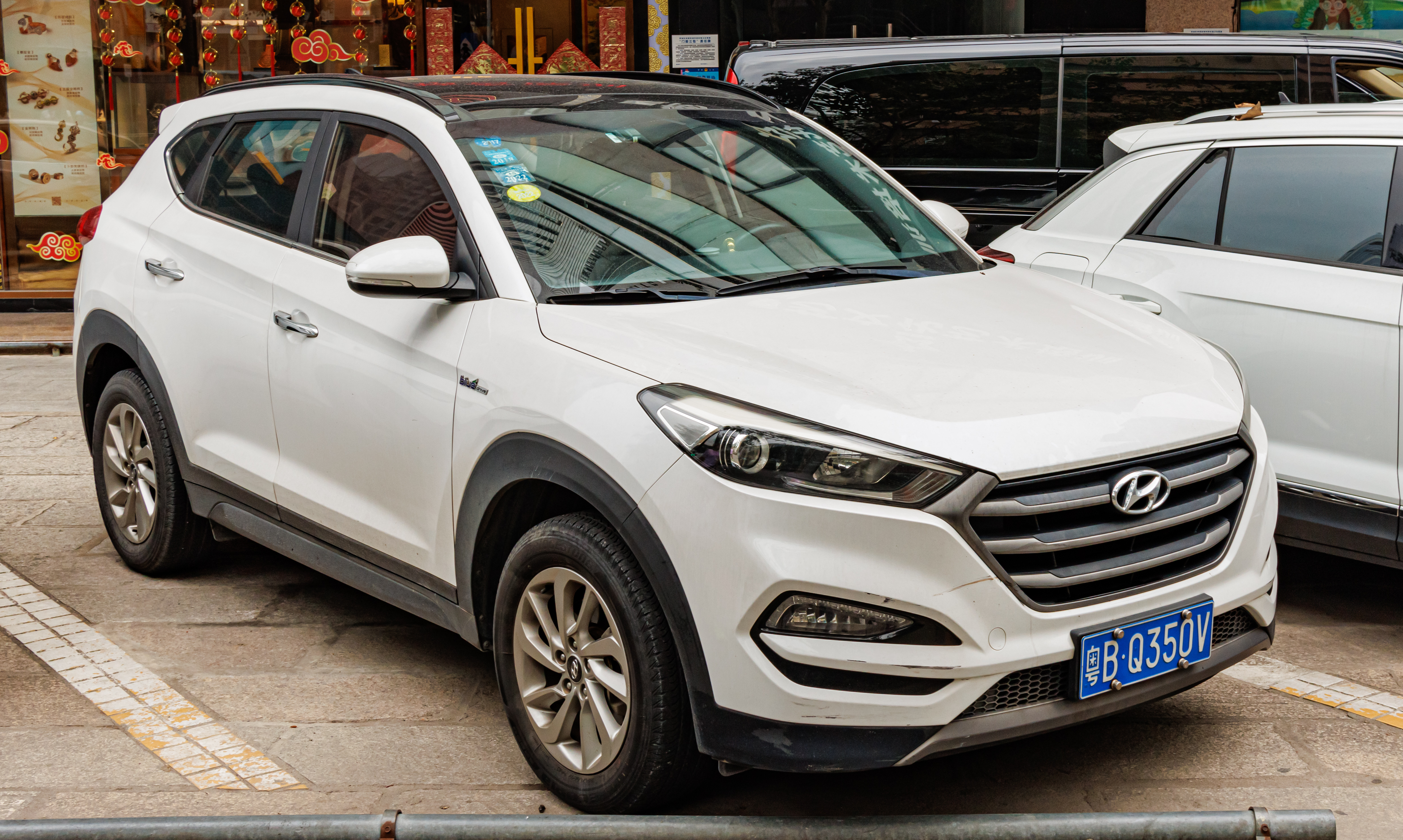
2015–2018
现代途胜TL
Hyundai Tucson TL

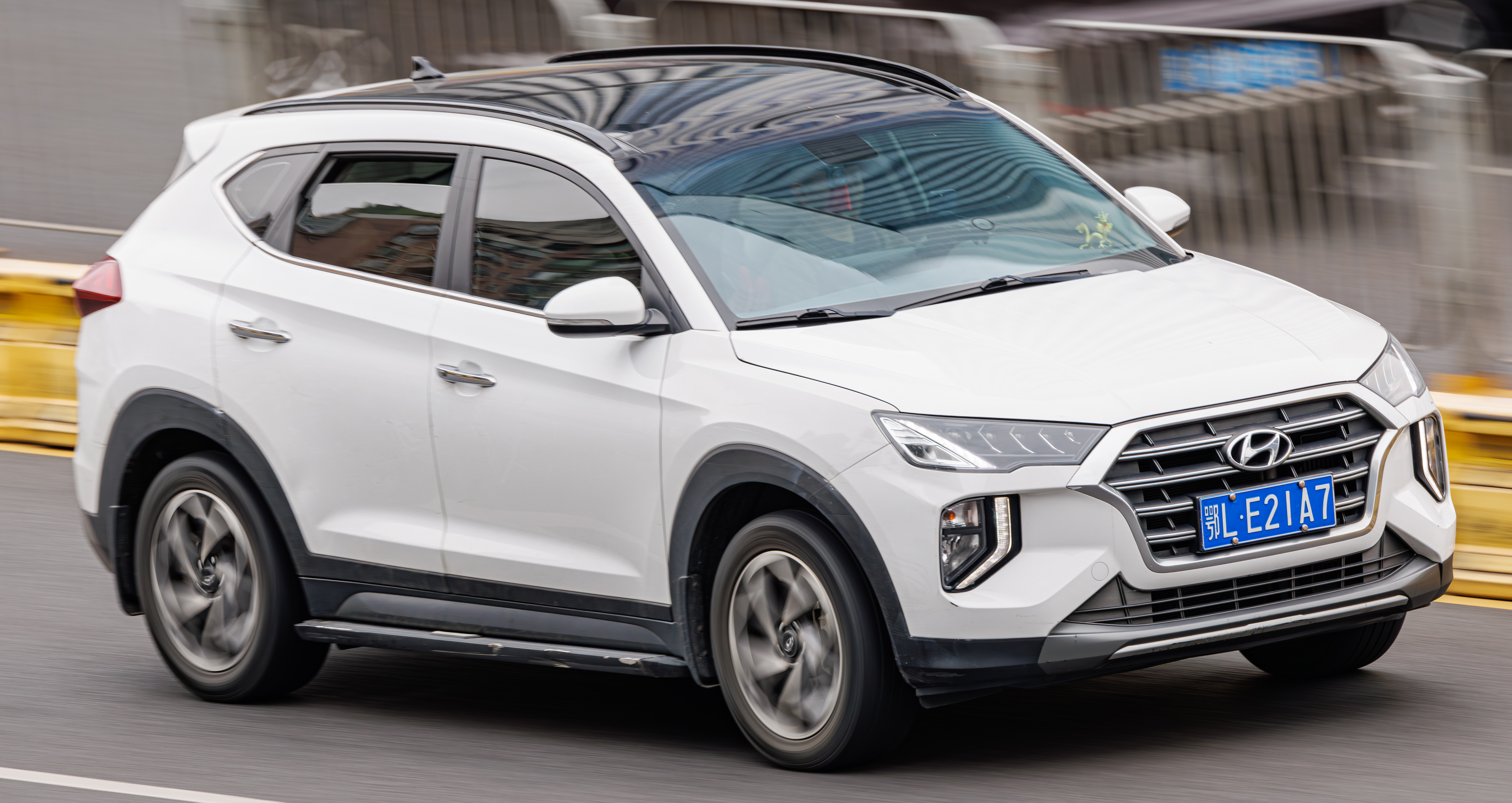
2019–2021
现代途胜TL
Hyundai Tucson TL

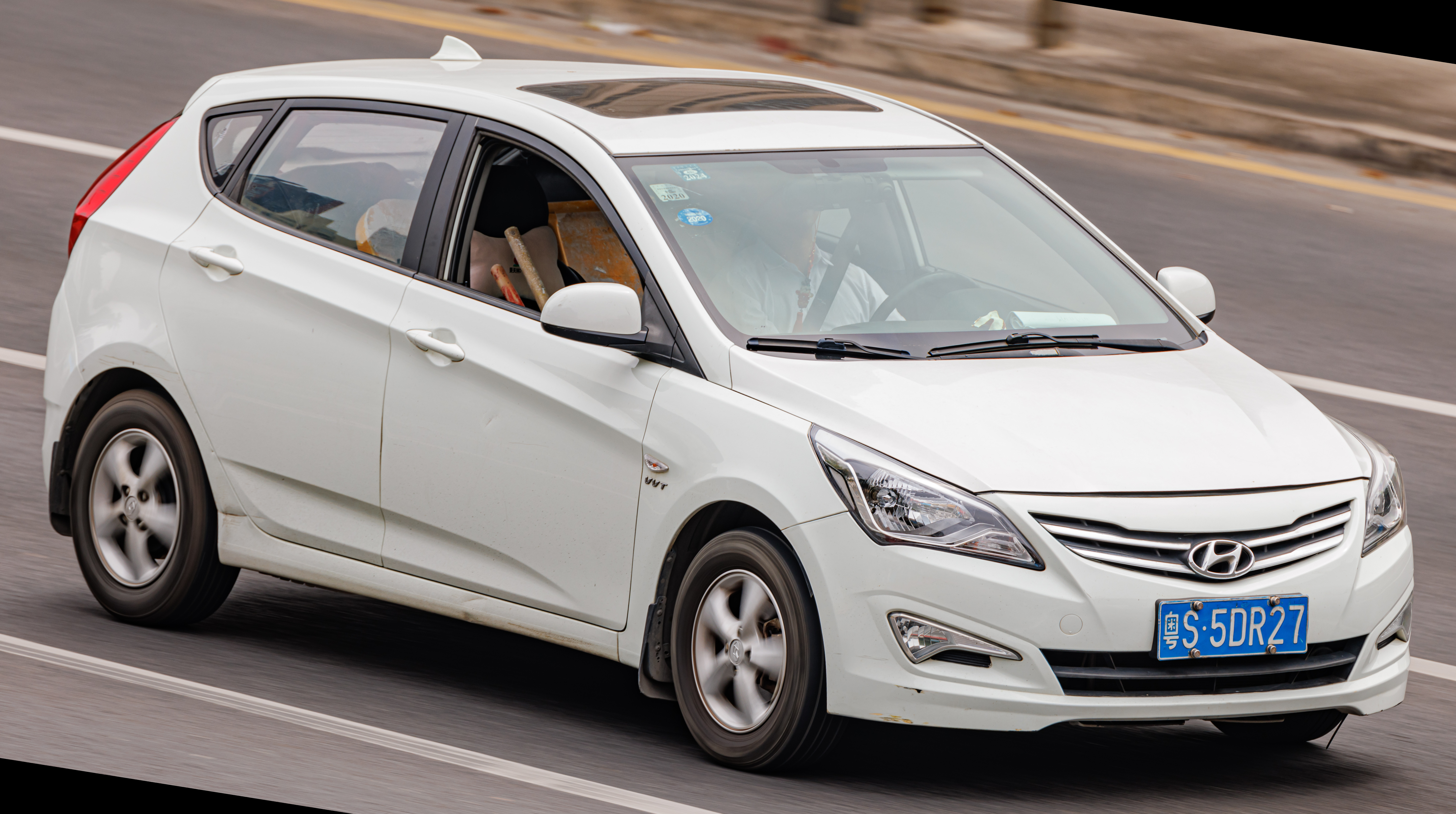
2014–2019
现代瑞奕
Hyundai Verna Hatchback

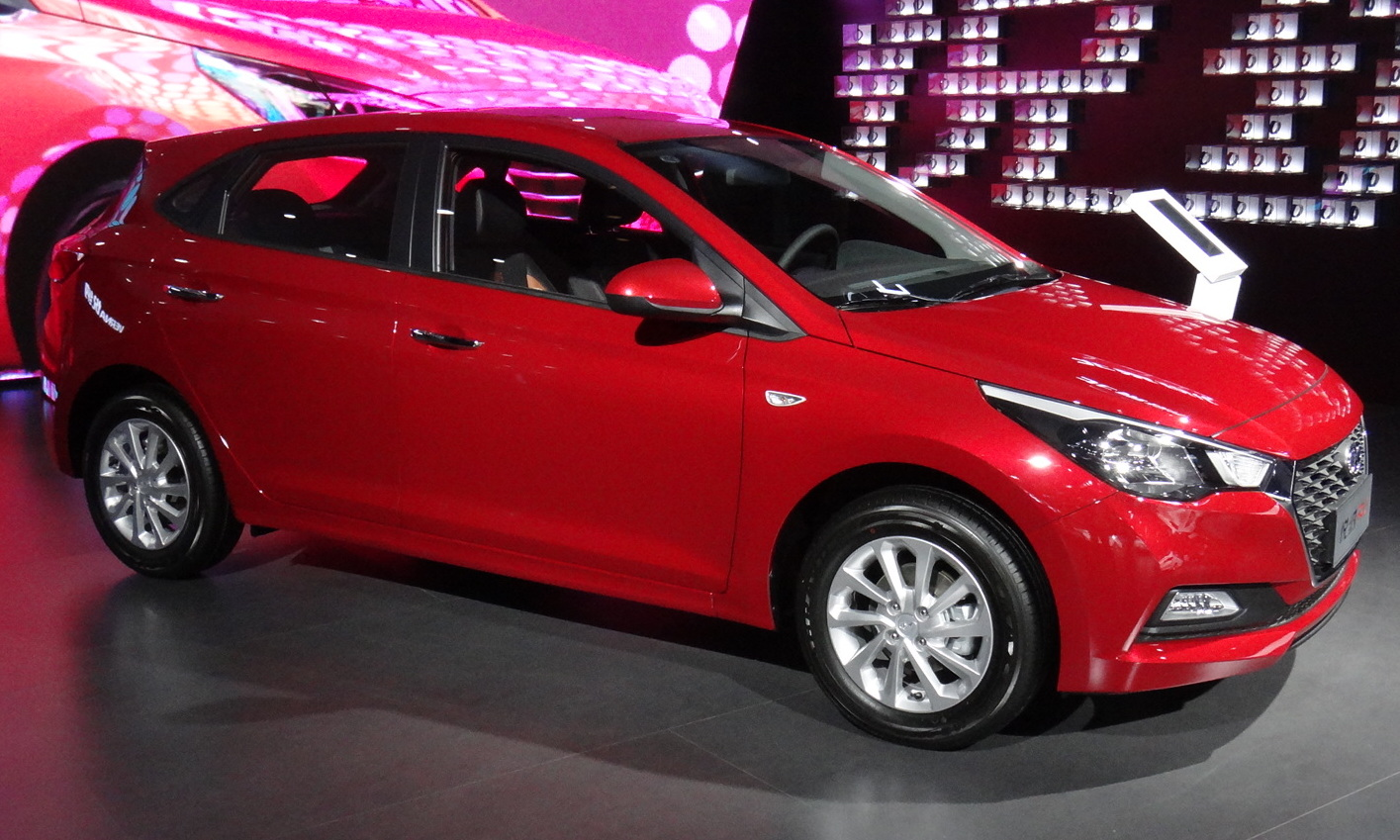
2016–2022
现代悦纳RV
Hyundai Verna RV

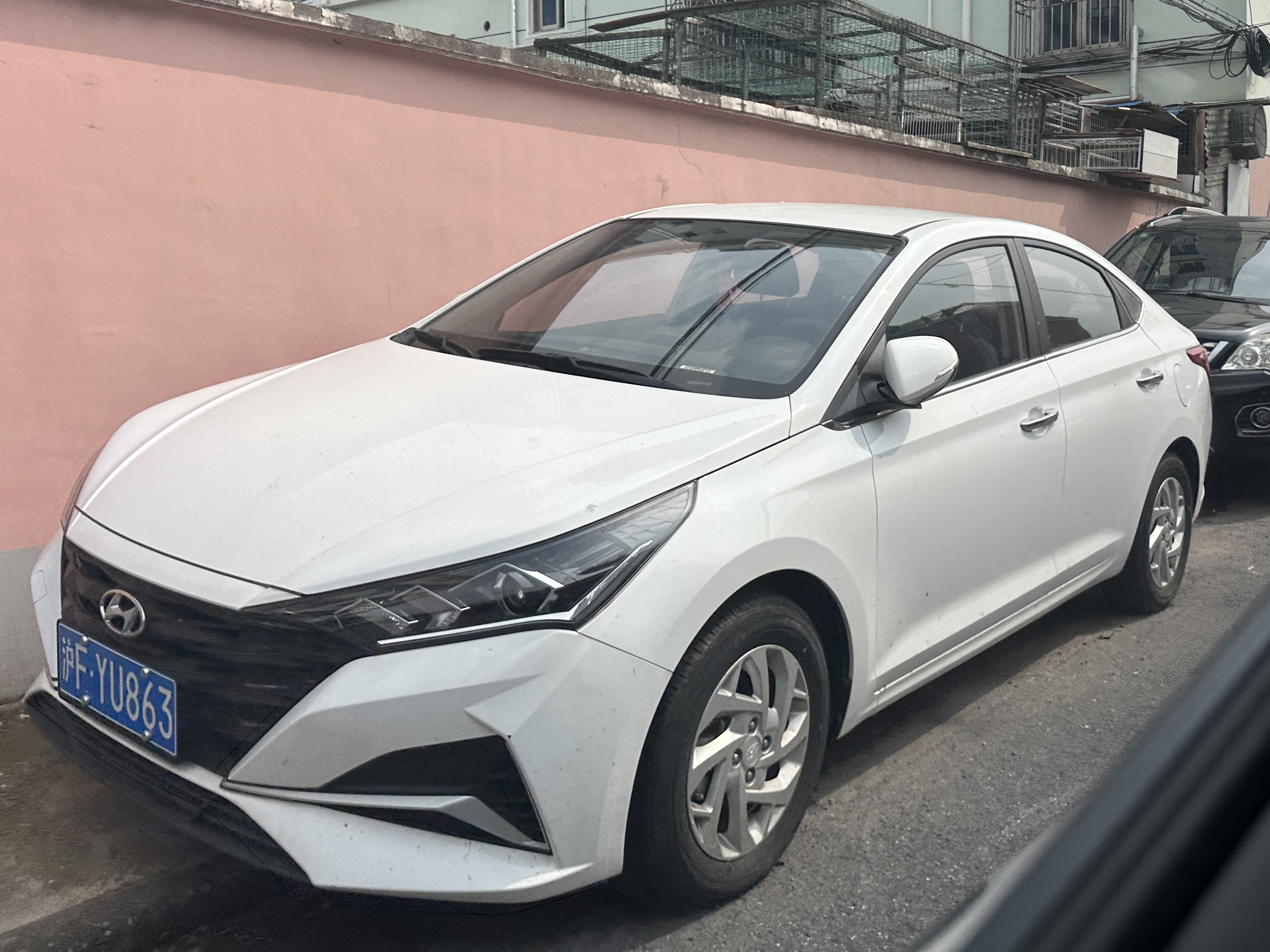
2016–2022
现代悦纳
Hyundai Verna HC

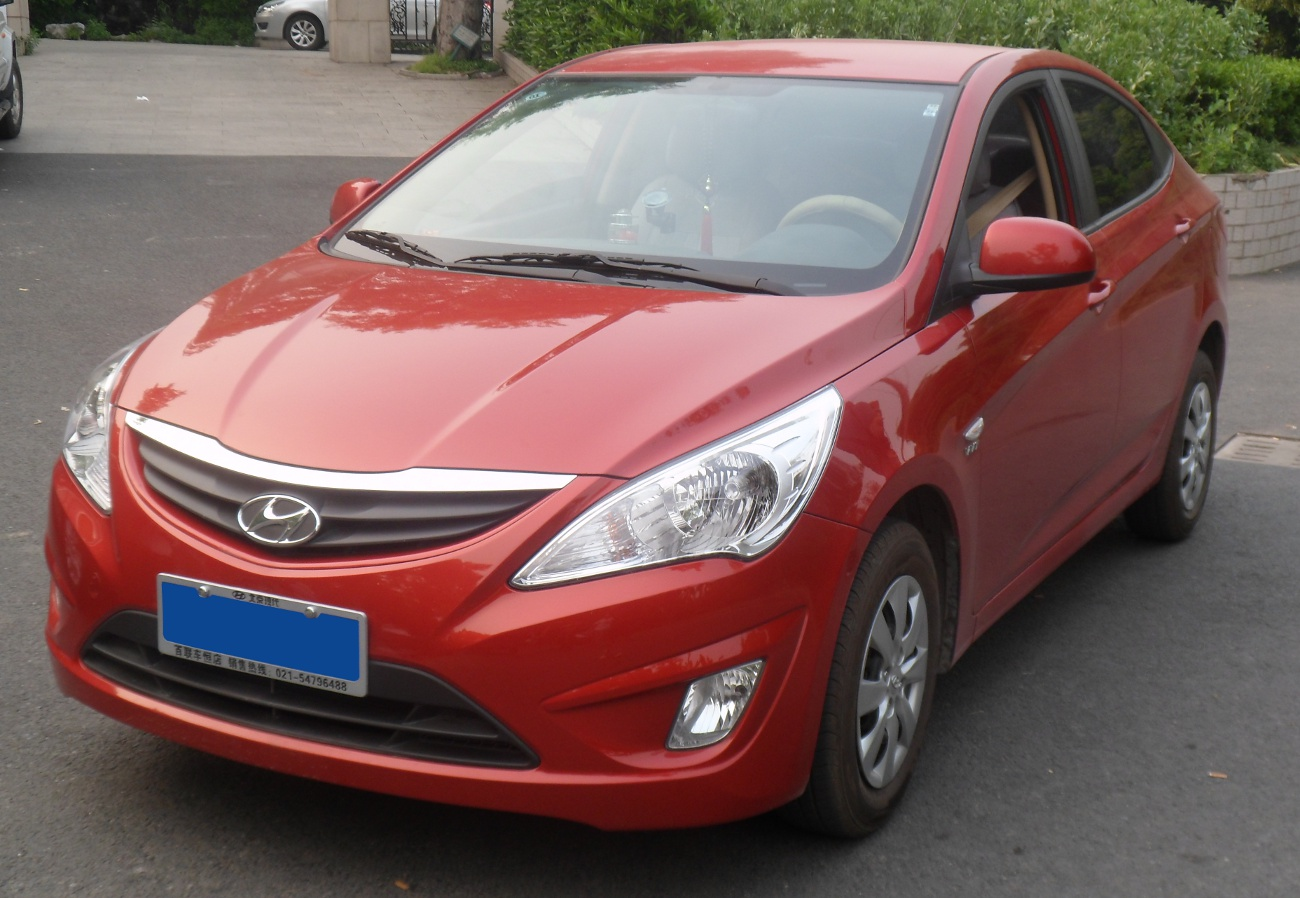
2010–2013
现代雅绅特RC
Hyundai Verna RC I

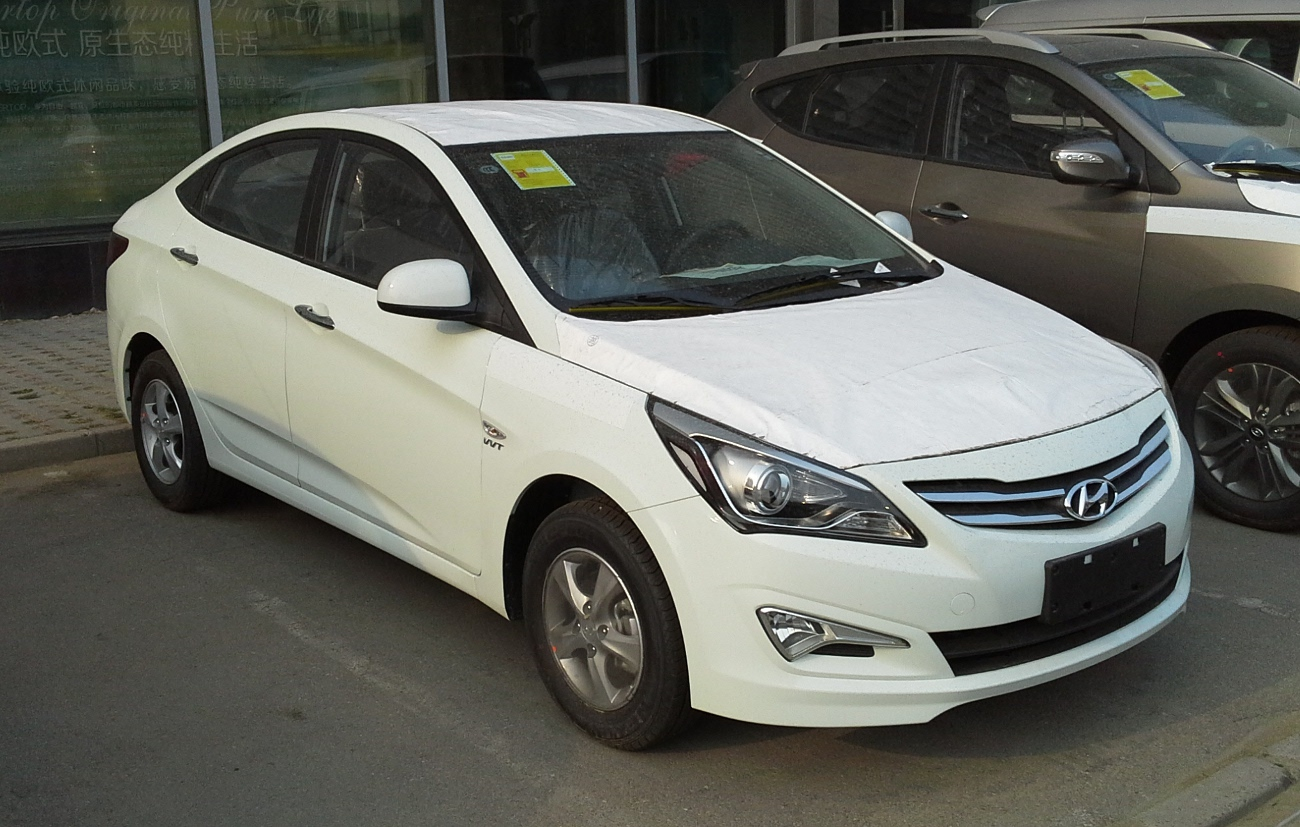
2014–2018
现代雅绅特RC
Hyundai Verna RC II

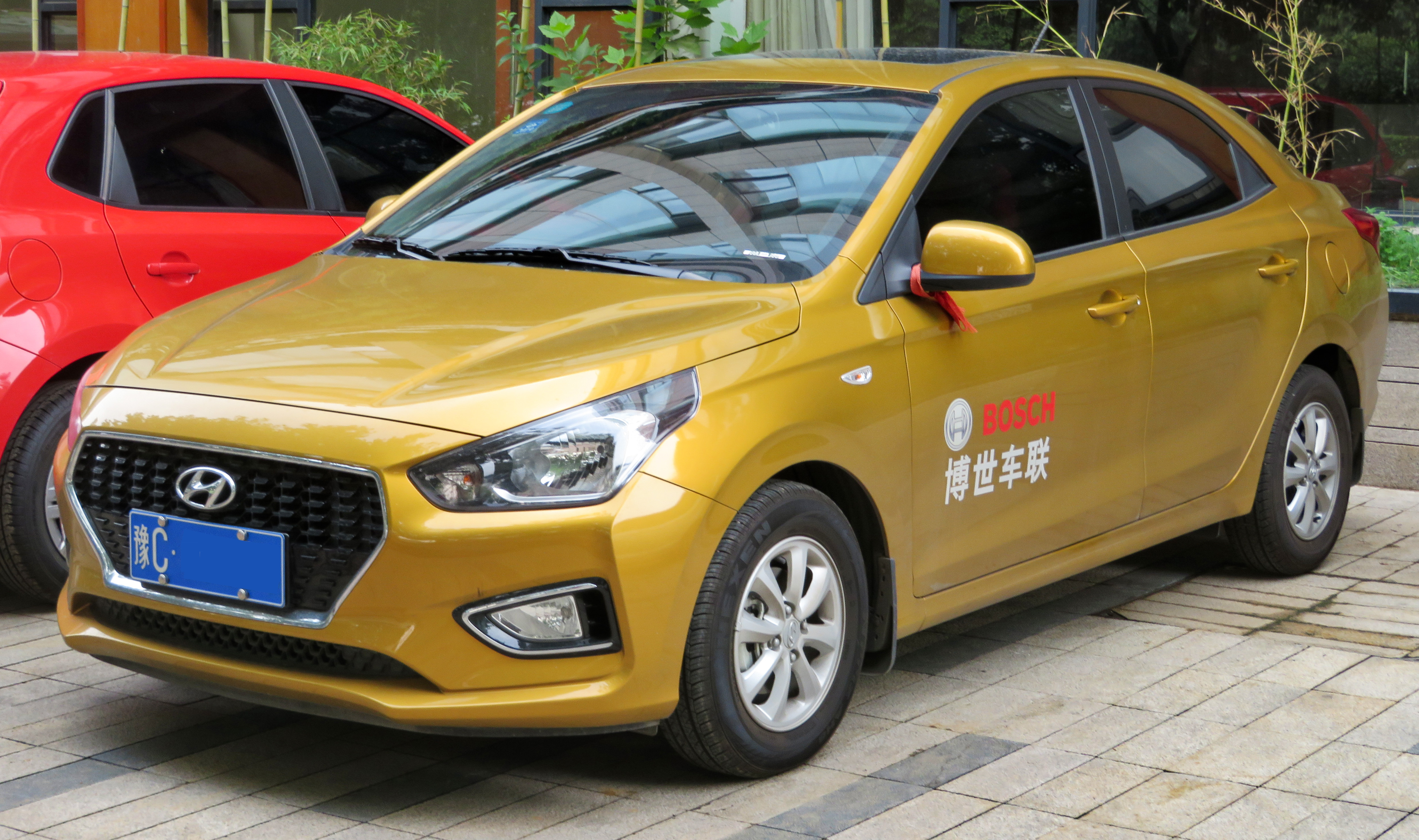
2017–2021
现代瑞纳
Hyundai Reina

=== Current imported ===
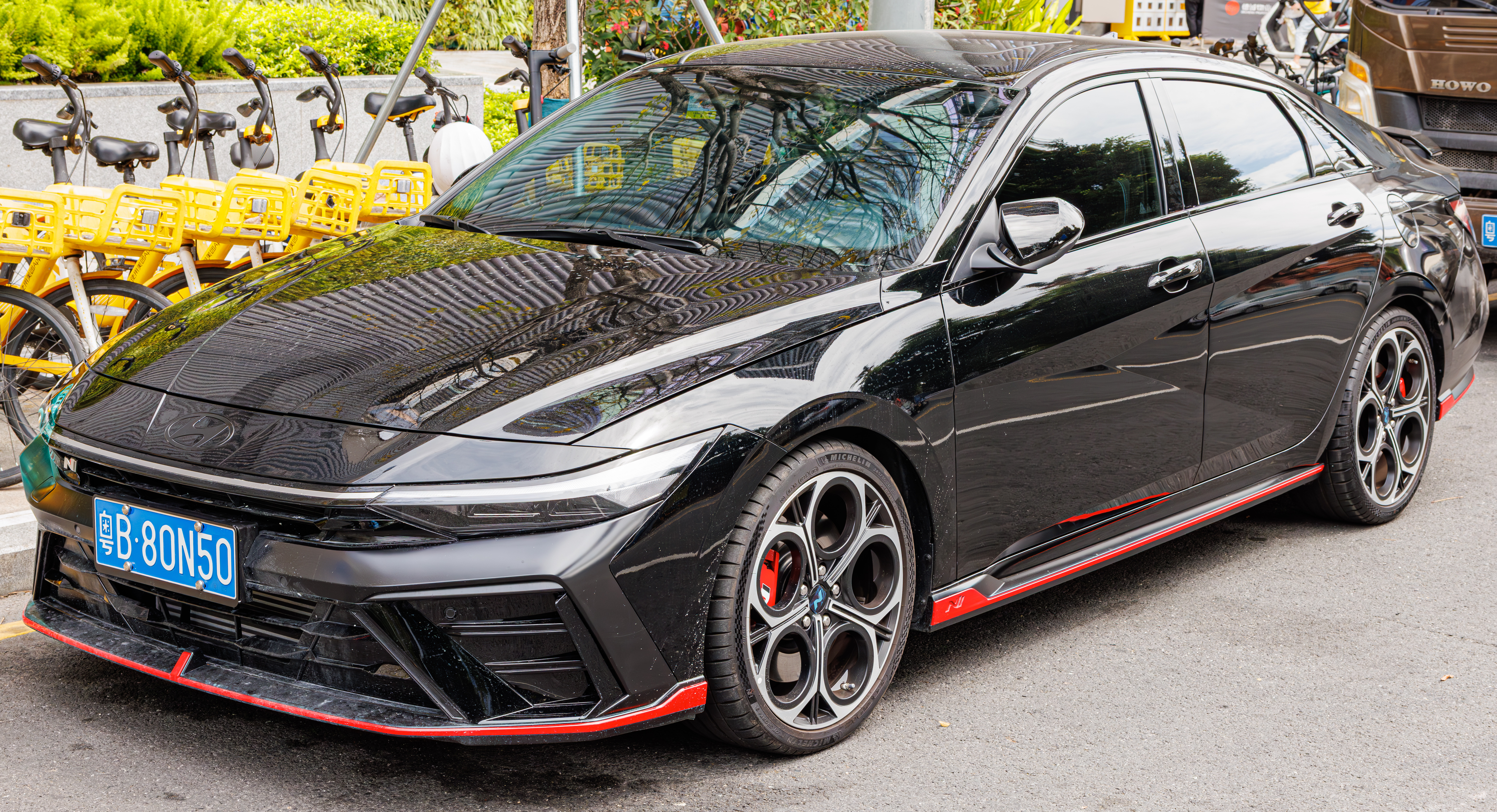
2023–present
现代伊兰特N
Hyundai Elantra N

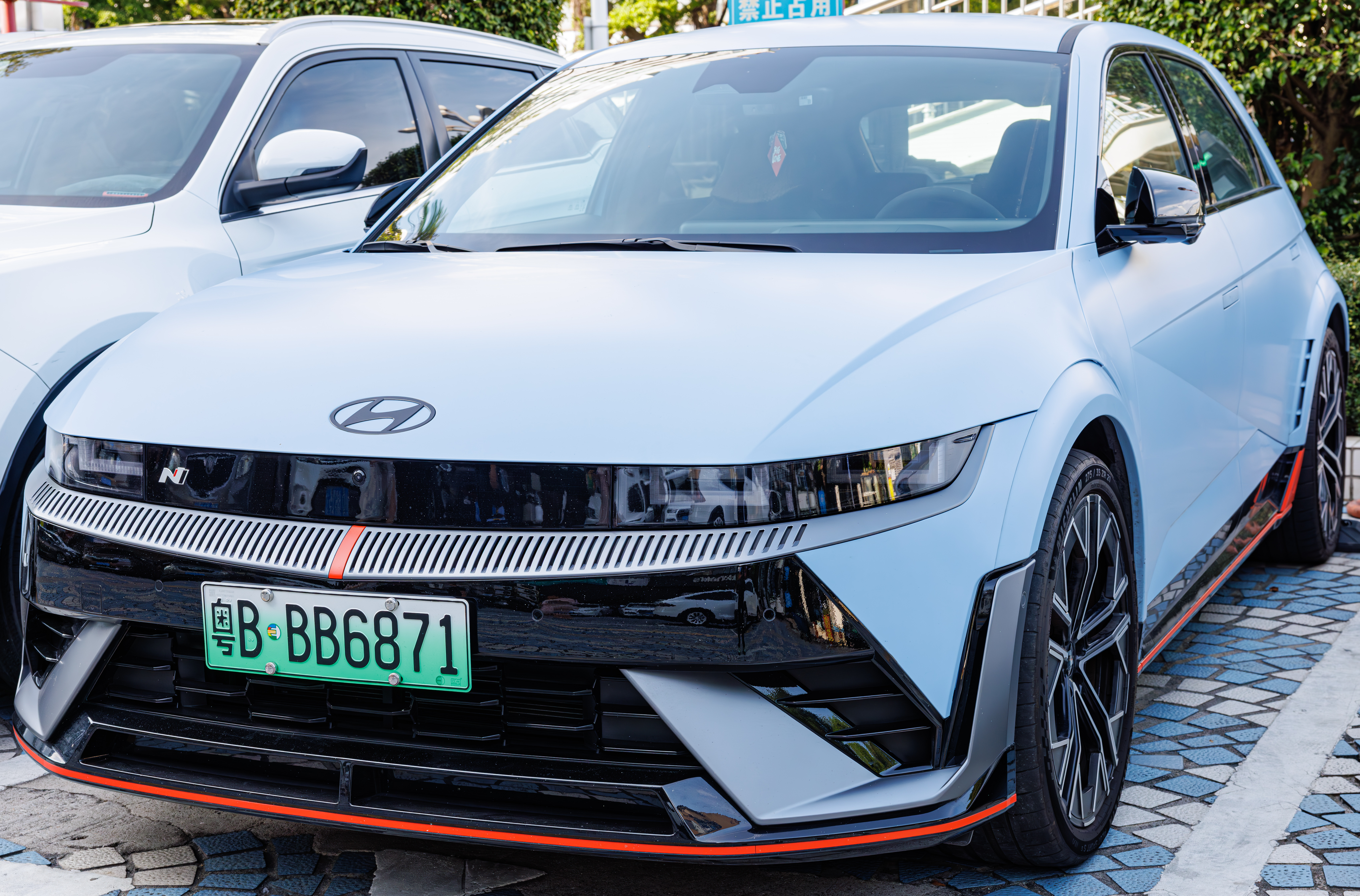
2024–present
现代 Ioniq 5 N
Hyundai Ioniq 5 N

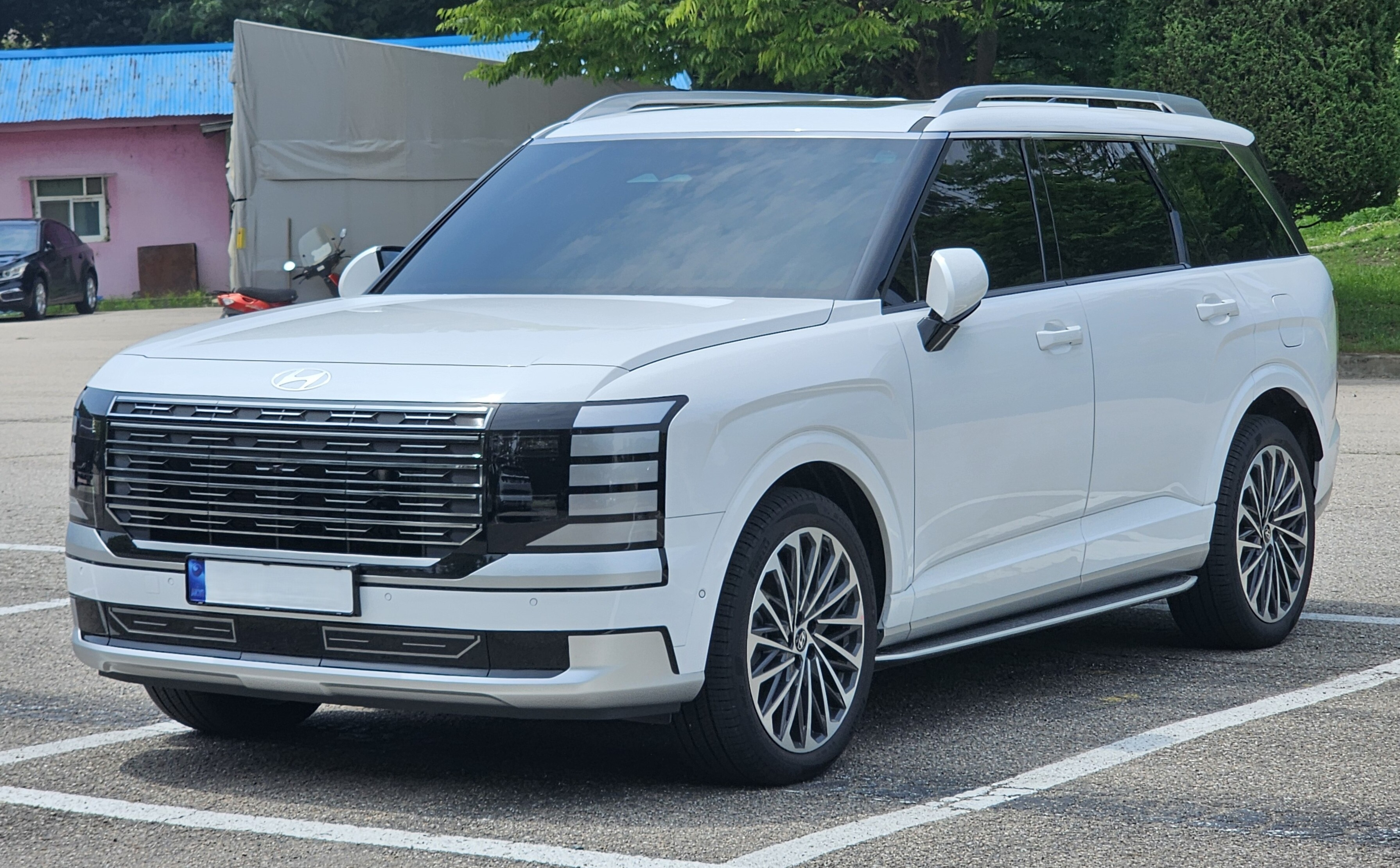
2025–present
现代帕里斯帝LX3
Hyundai Palisade LX3

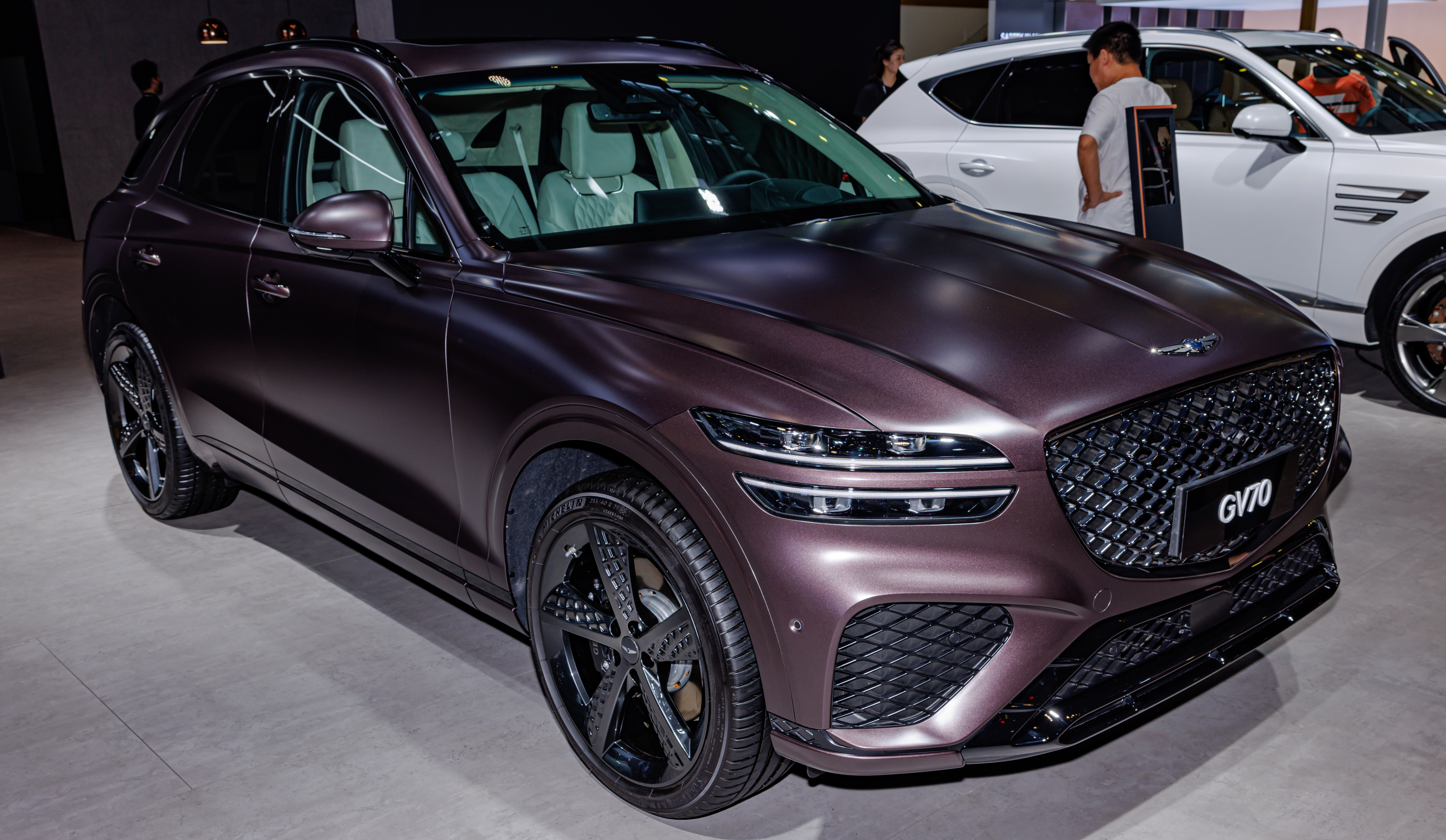
2020–present
捷恩斯 GV70
Genesis GV70

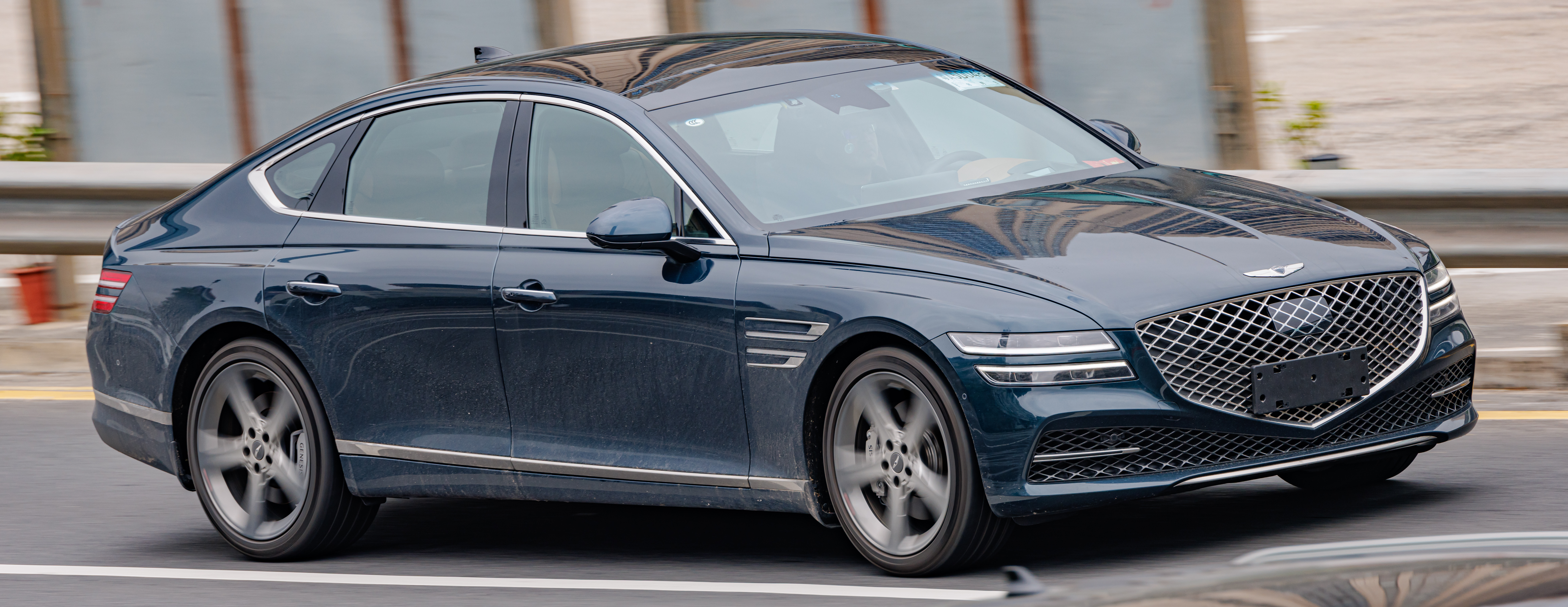
2021–present
捷恩斯 G80
Genesis G80

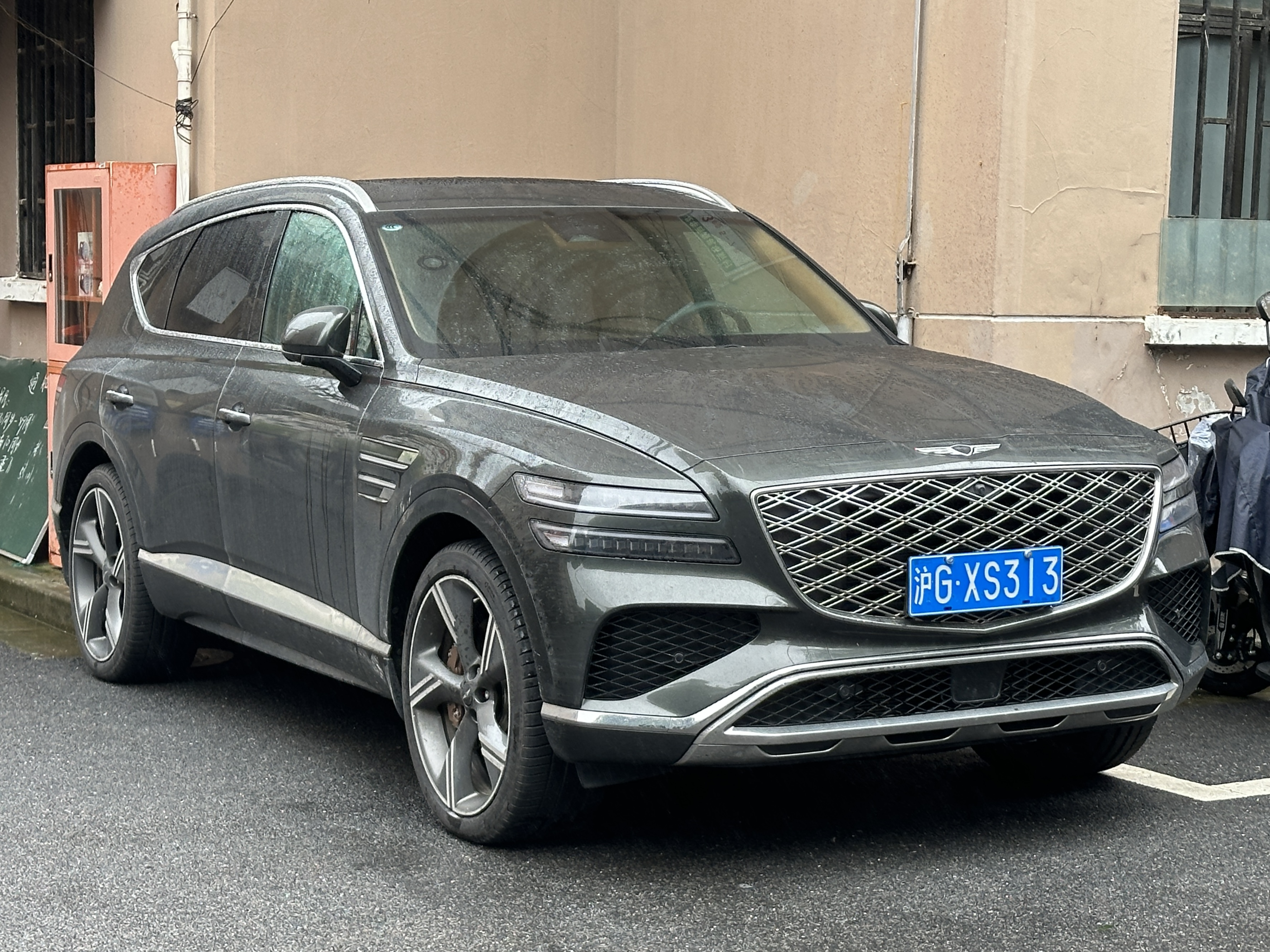
2021–present
捷恩斯 GV80
Genesis GV80

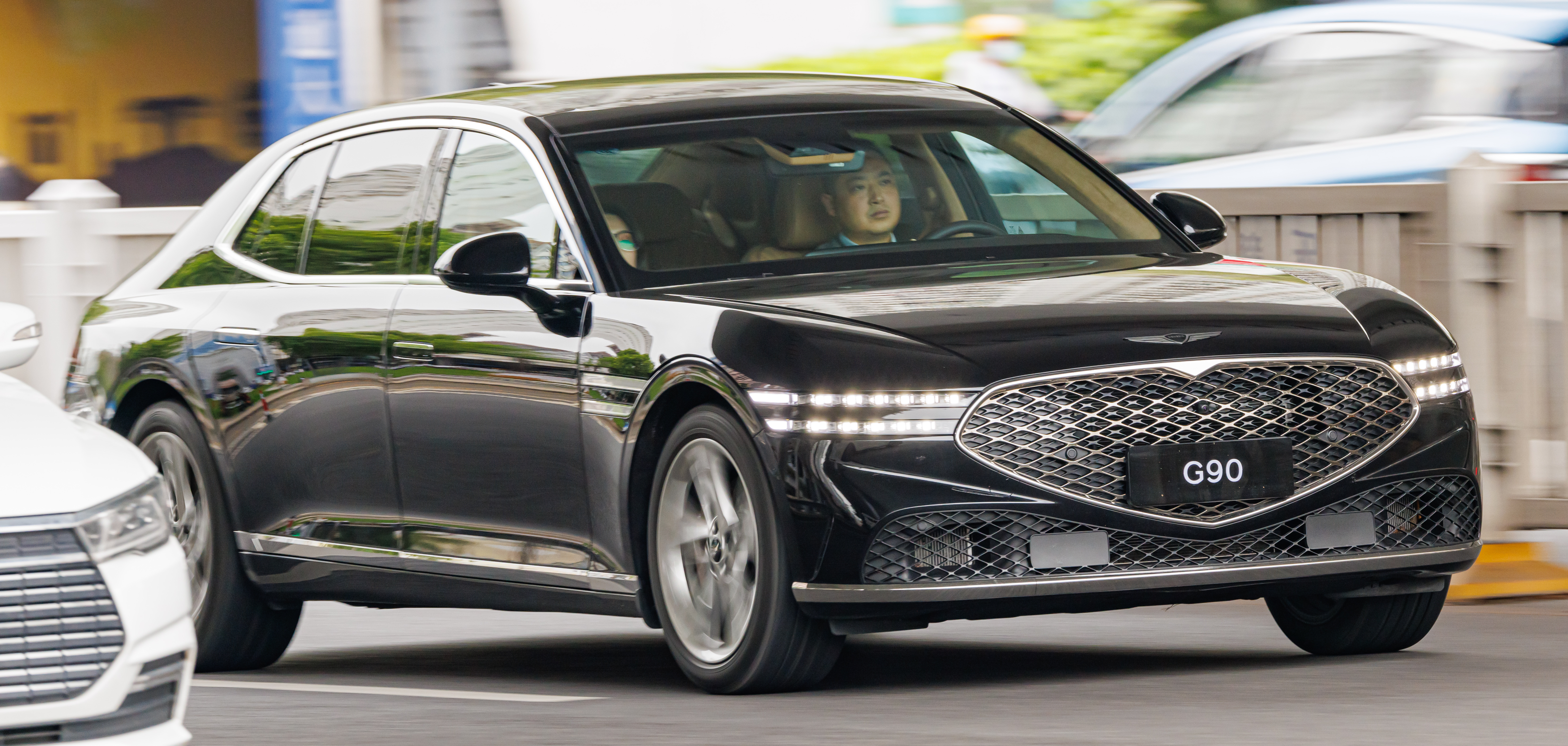
2021–present
捷恩斯 G90
Genesis G90

=== Former imported ===
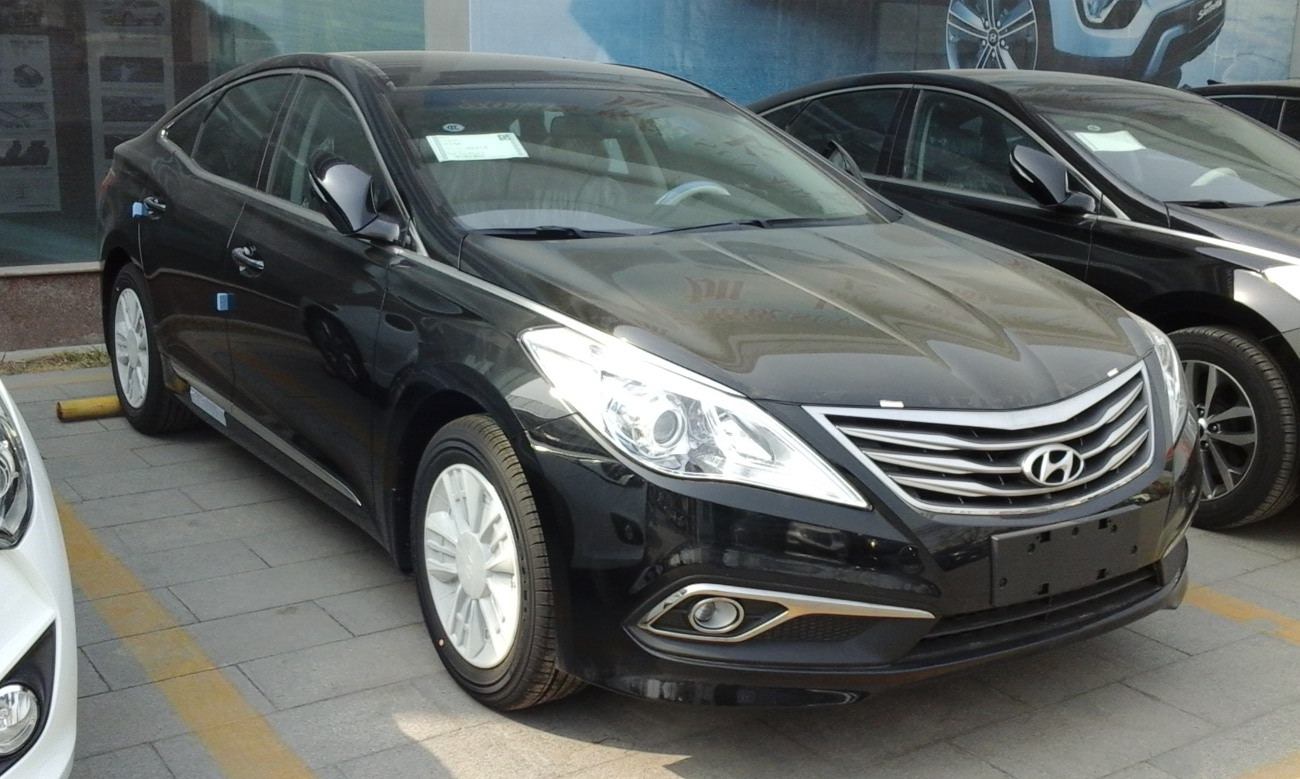
2006–2015
现代雅尊
Hyundai Azera

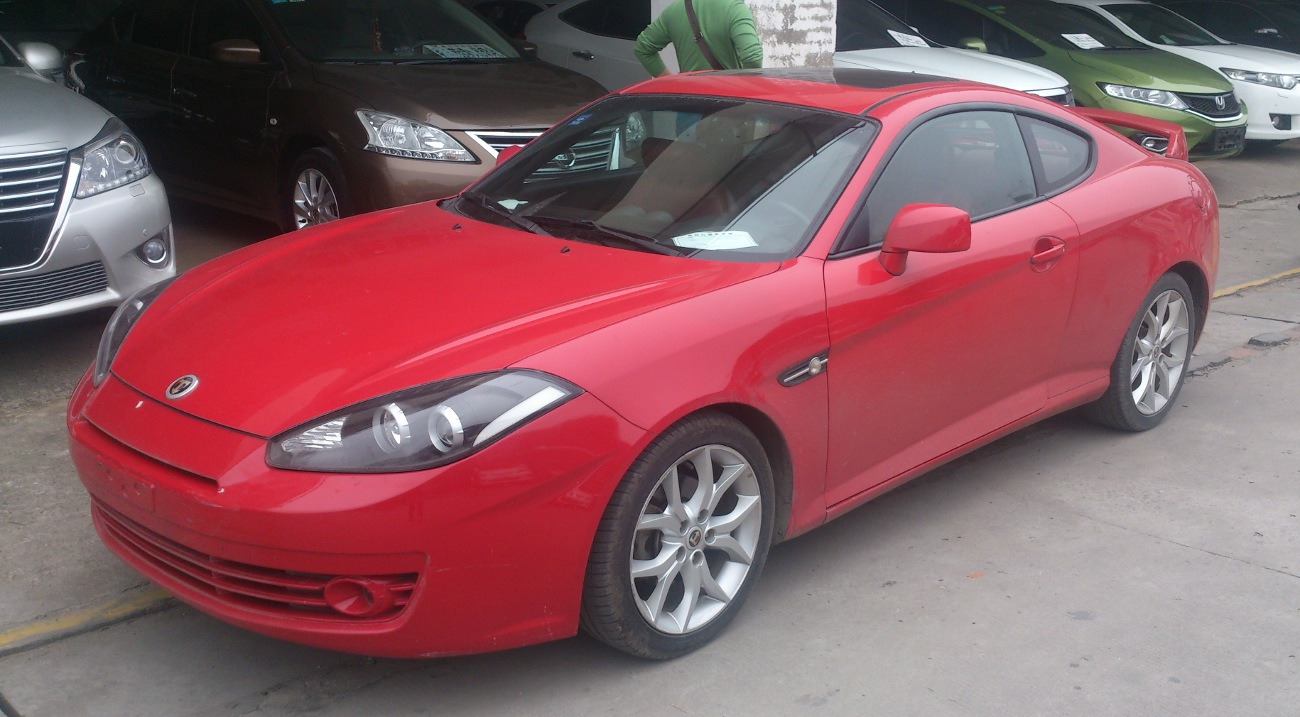
2004–2006
现代酷派
Hyundai Coupe

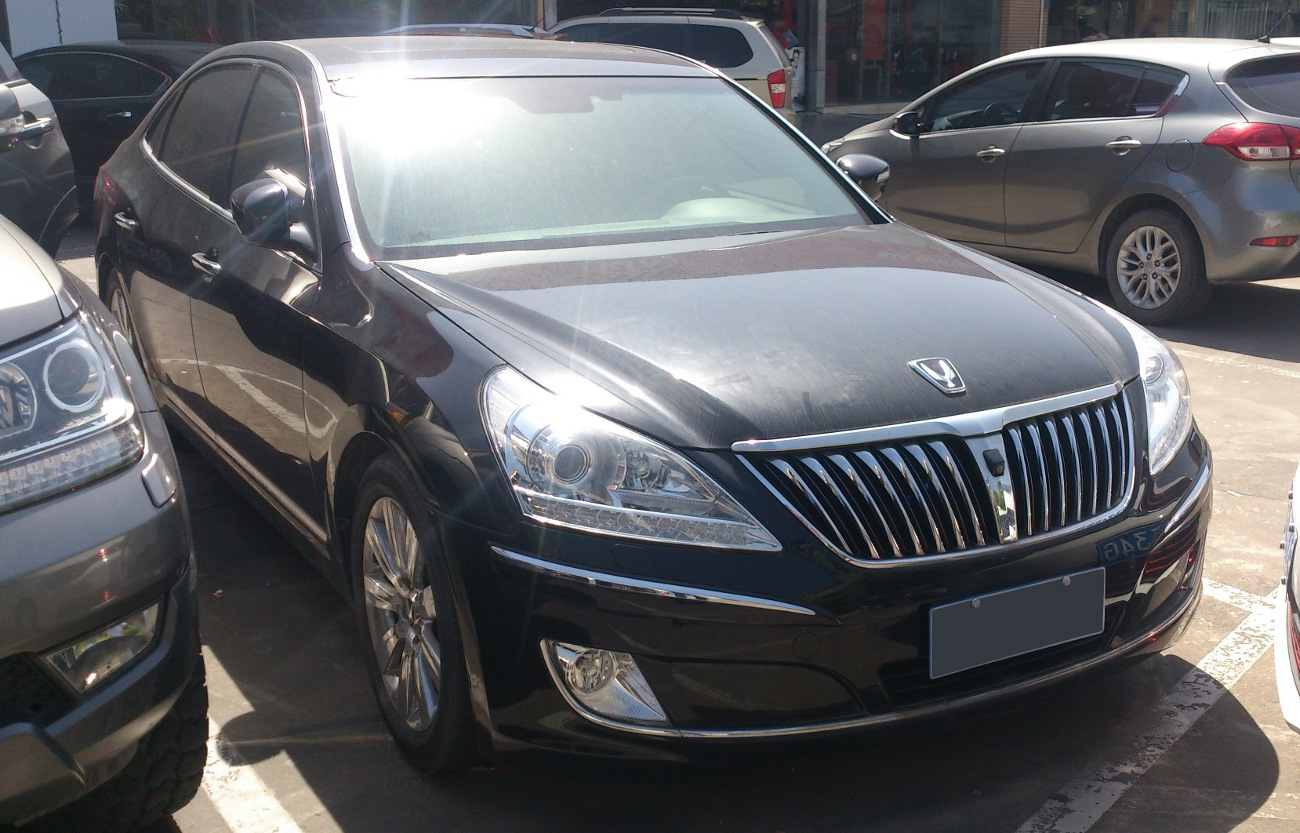
2004–2014
现代雅科仕
Hyundai Equus

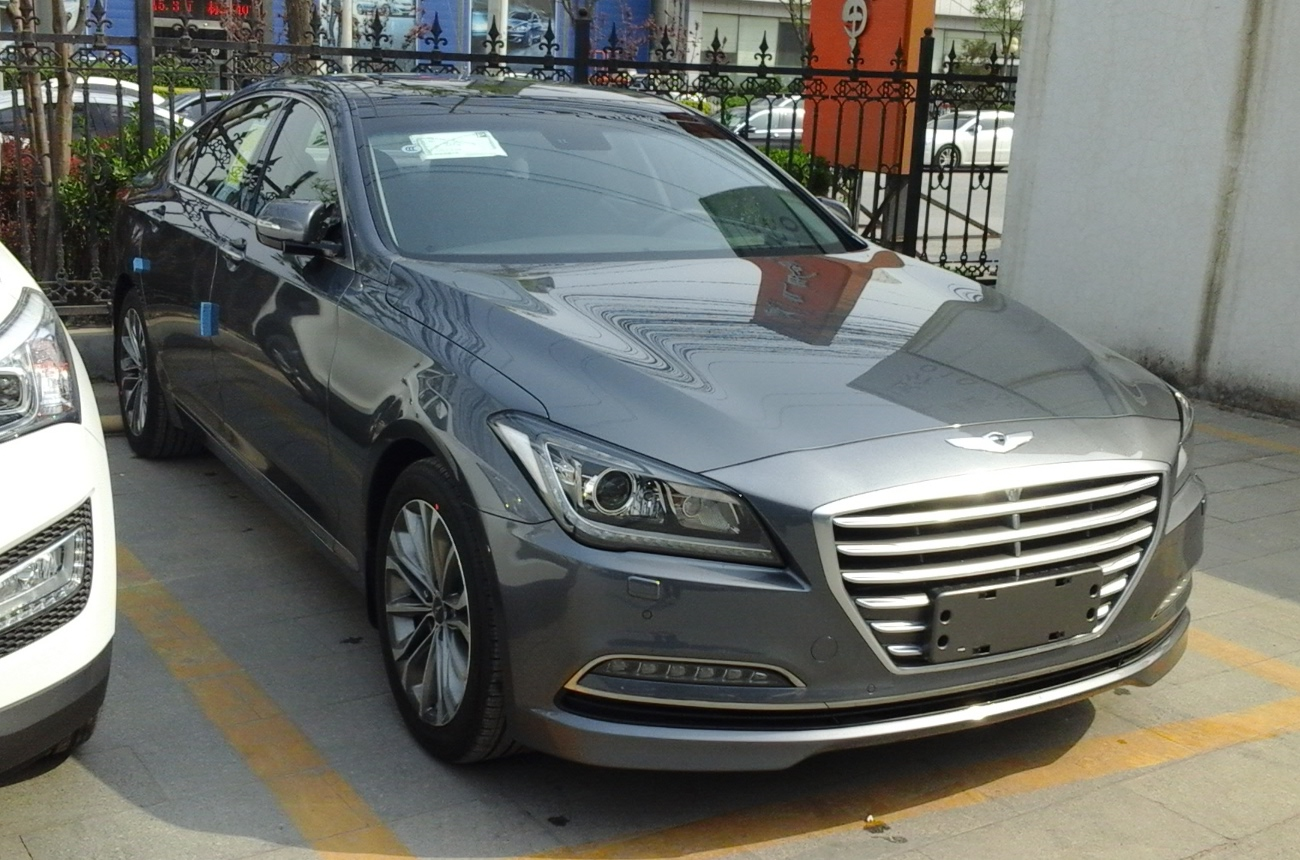
2015
现代捷恩斯
Hyundai Genesis

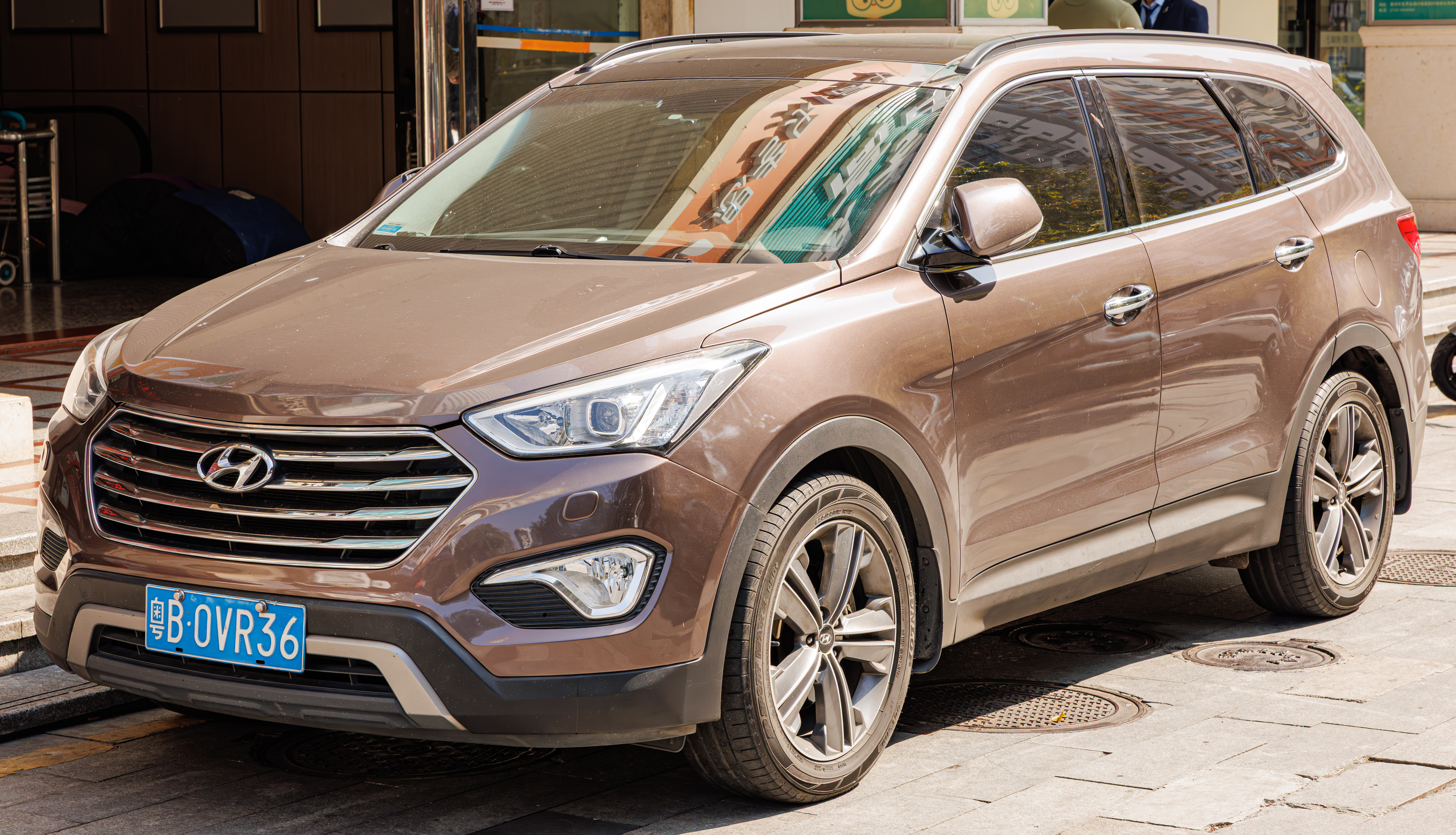
2013–2017
现代格越
Hyundai Grand Santa Fe

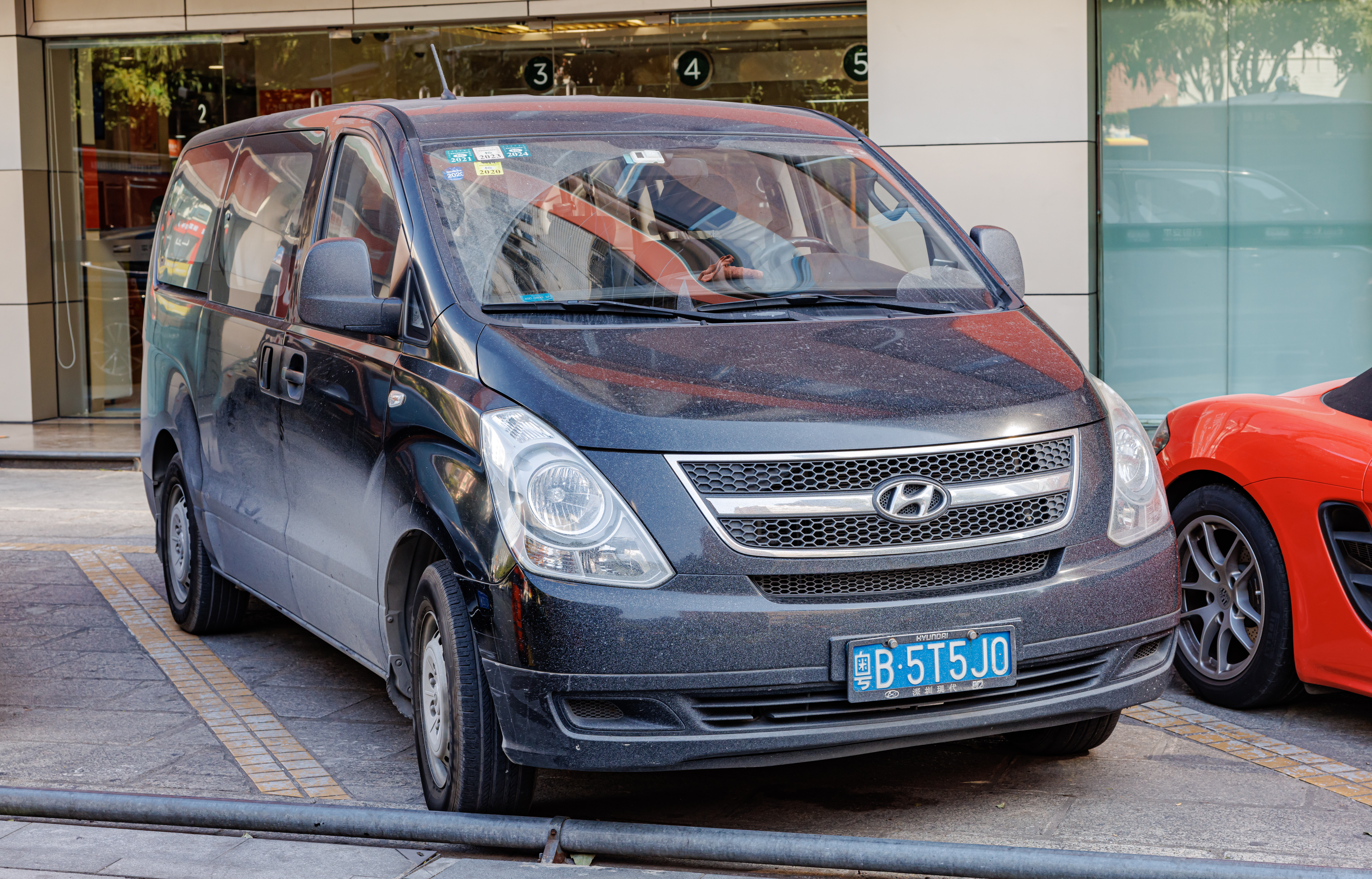
2011
现代辉翼
Hyundai H-1

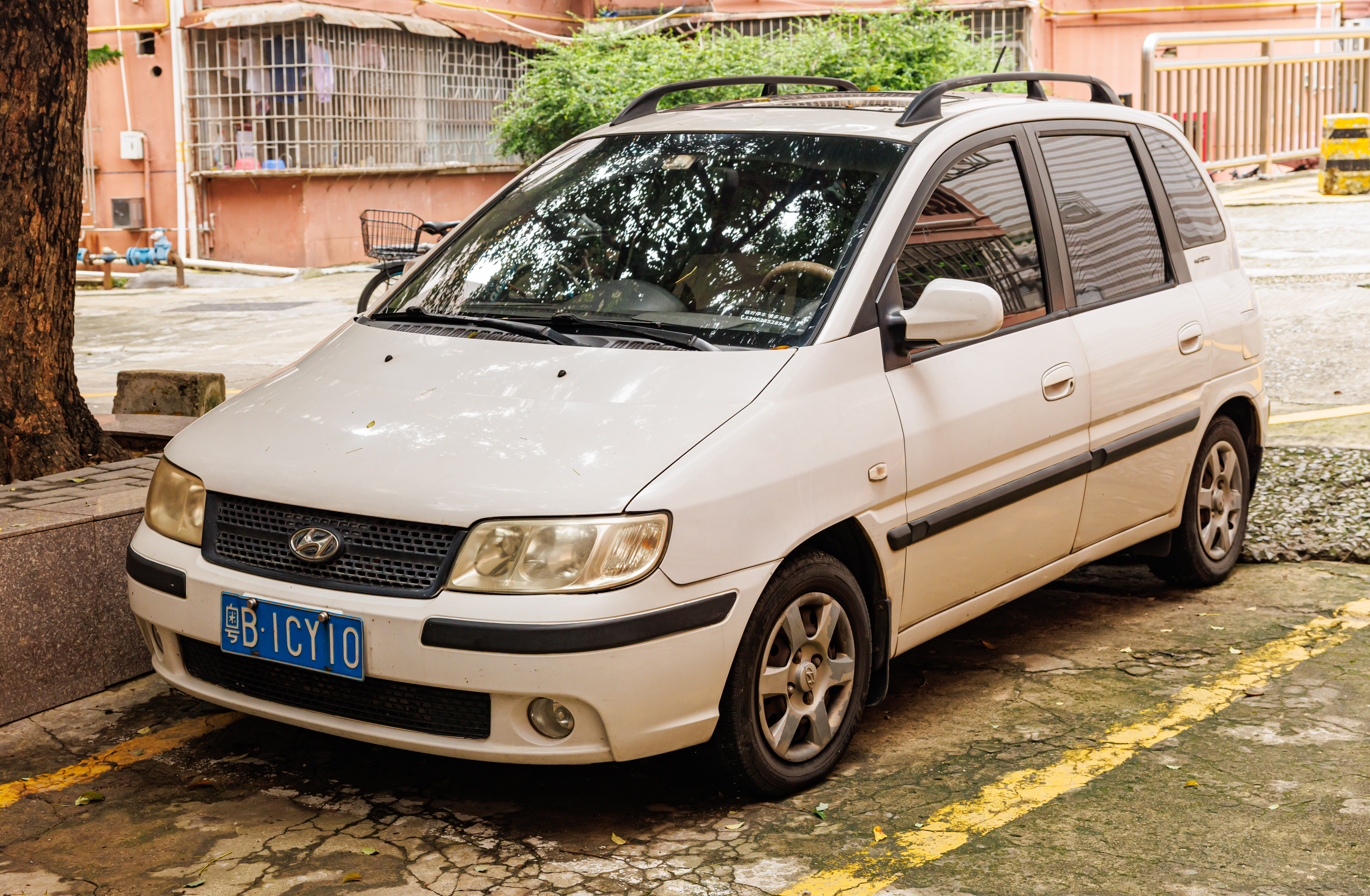
2005
现代美佳
Hyundai Matrix

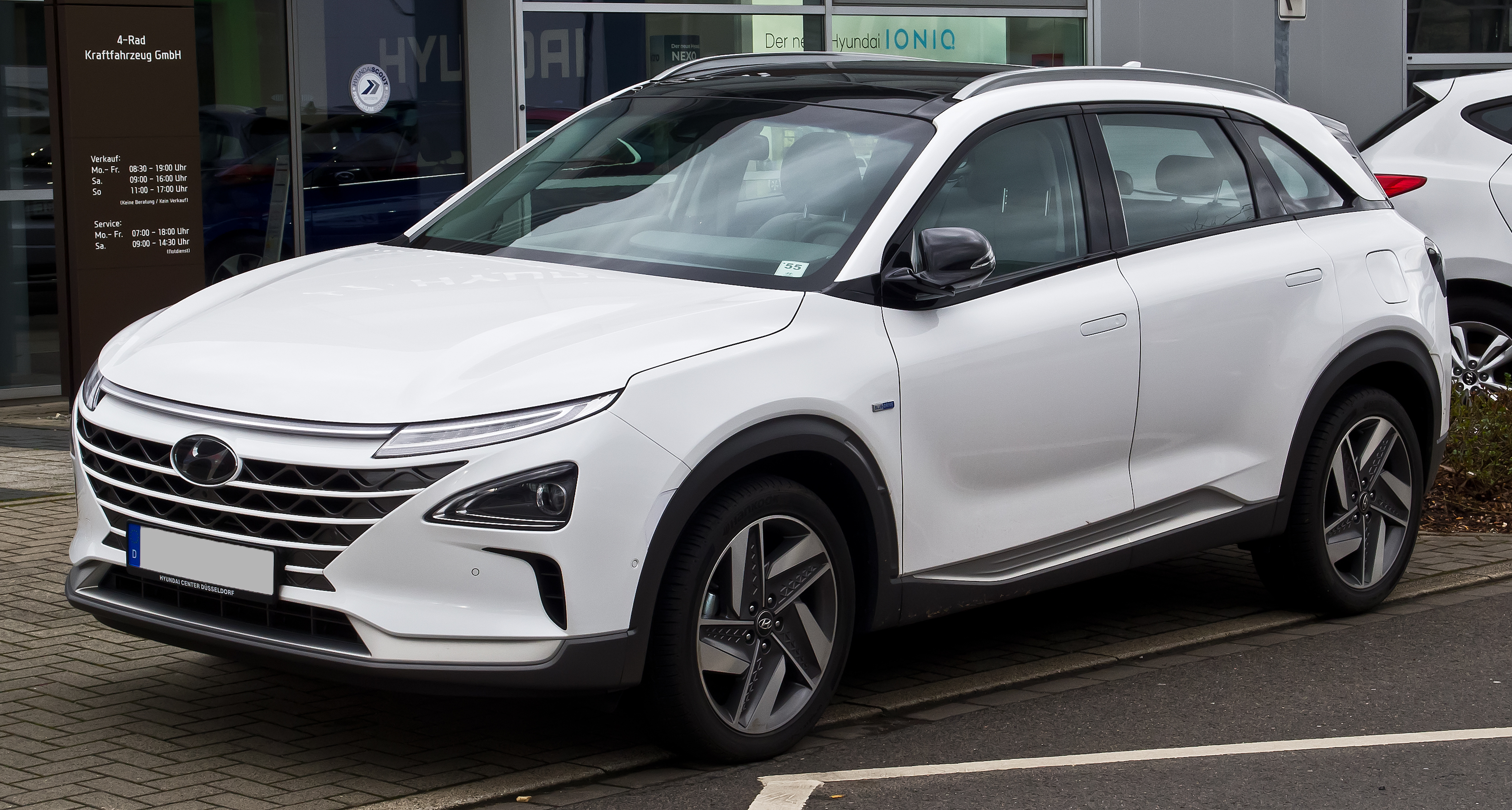
2018
现代 Nexo
Hyundai Nexo

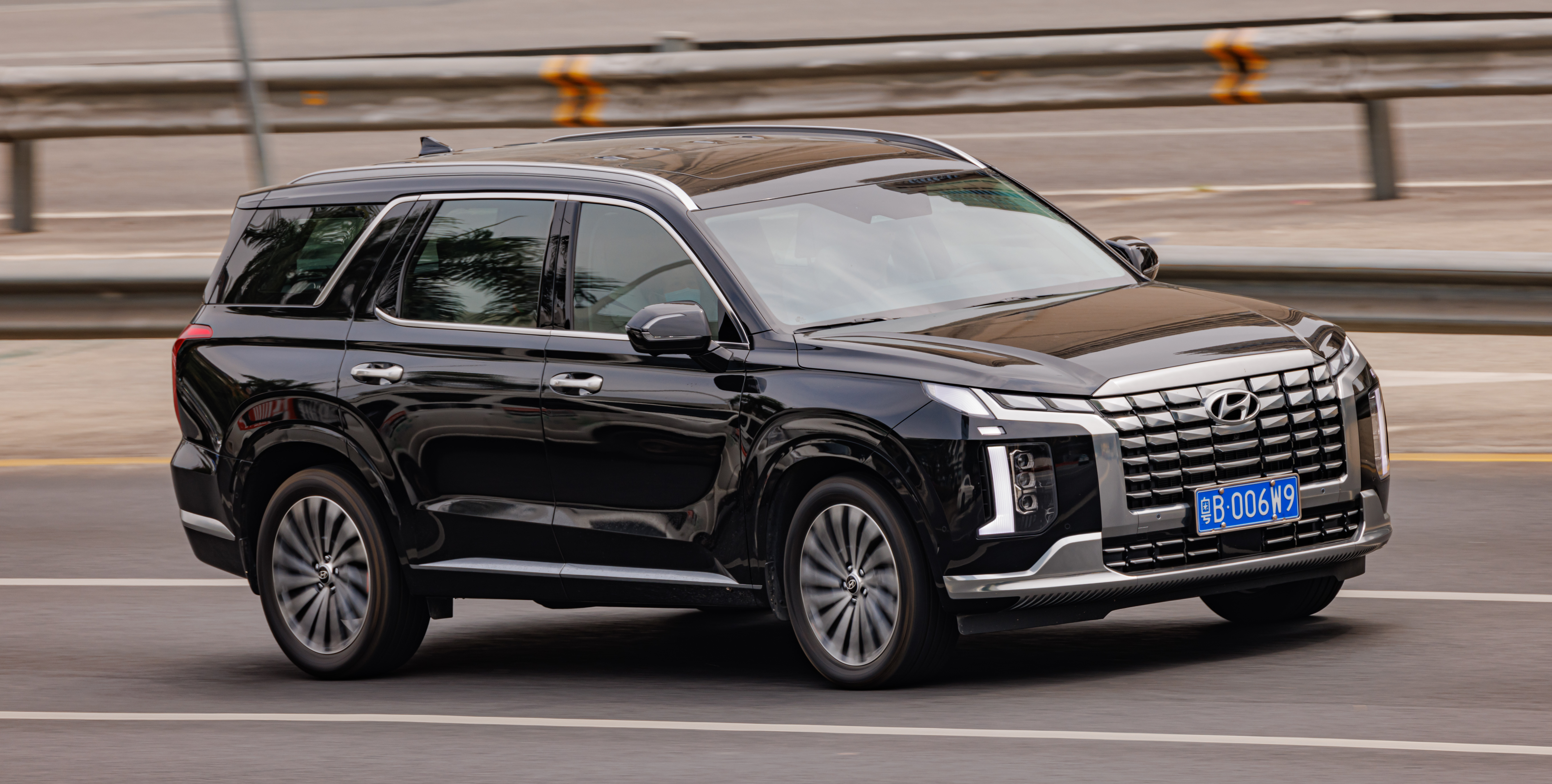
2020–2025
现代帕里斯帝LX2
Hyundai Palisade LX2

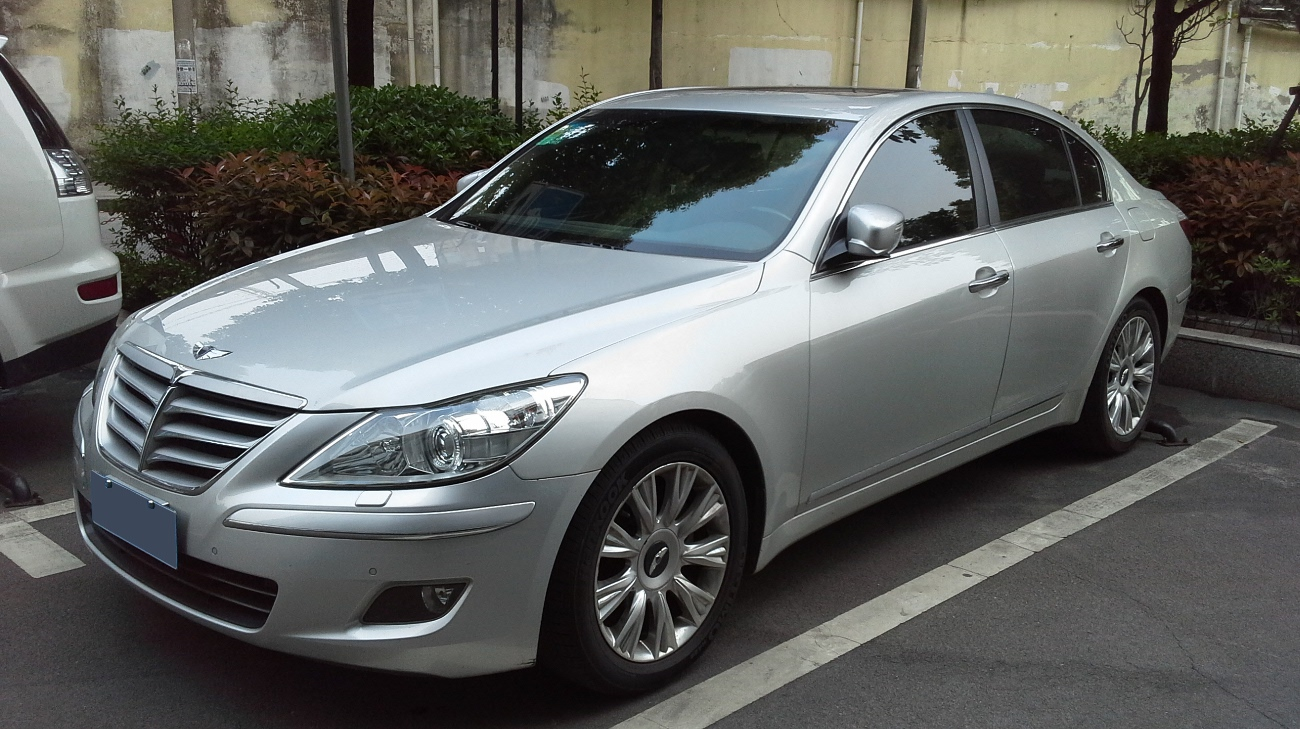
2008–2012
现代劳恩斯
Hyundai Rohens

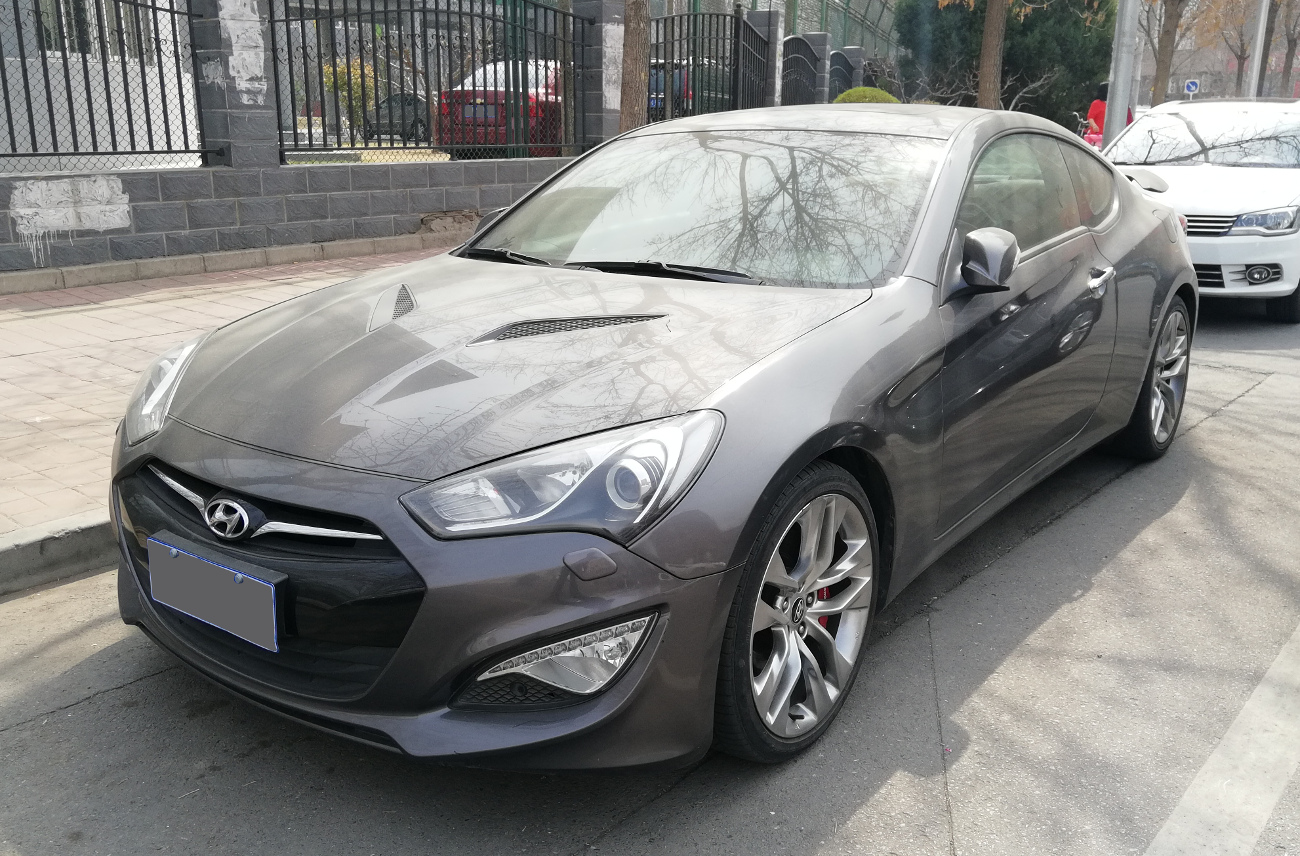
2009–2012
现代劳恩斯酷派
Hyundai Rohens Coupe

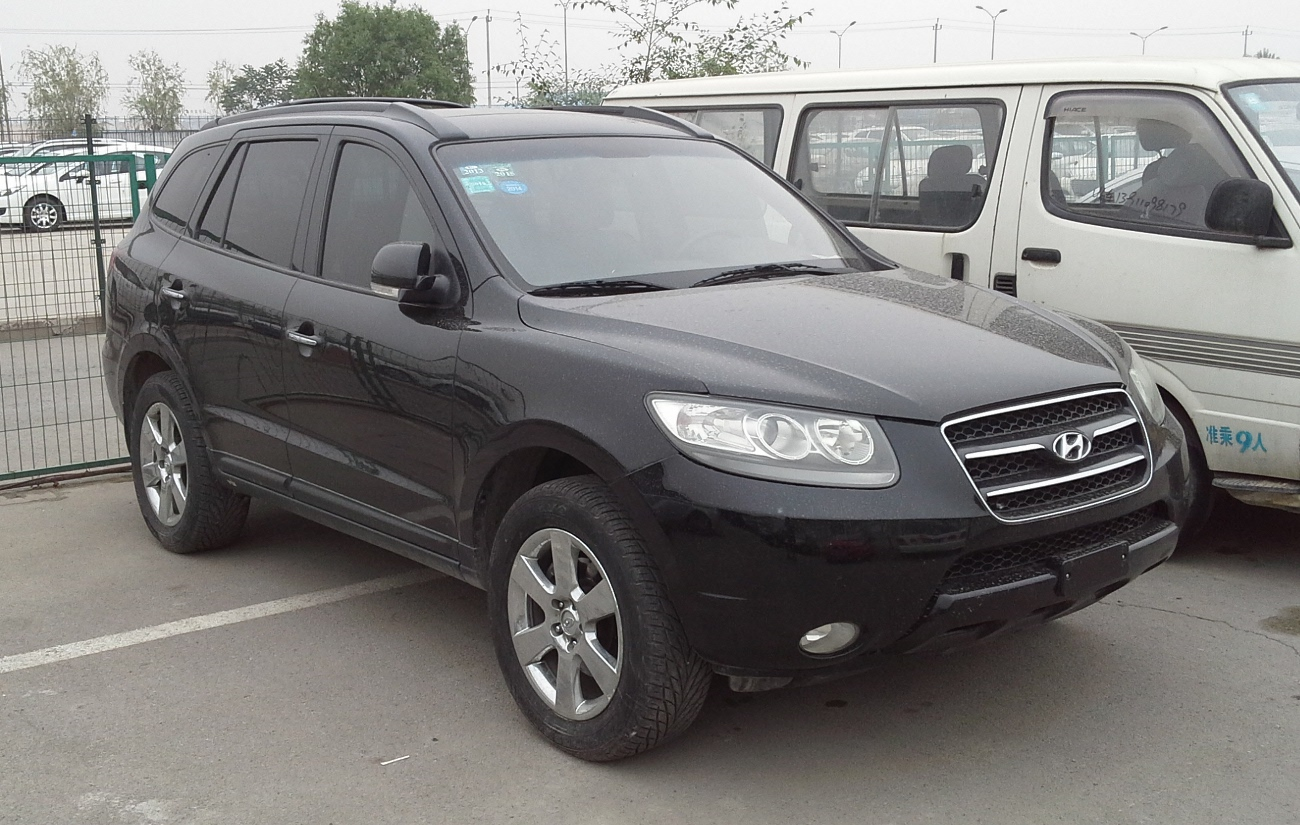
2006–2012
现代新胜达
Hyundai Santa Fe CM (imported)

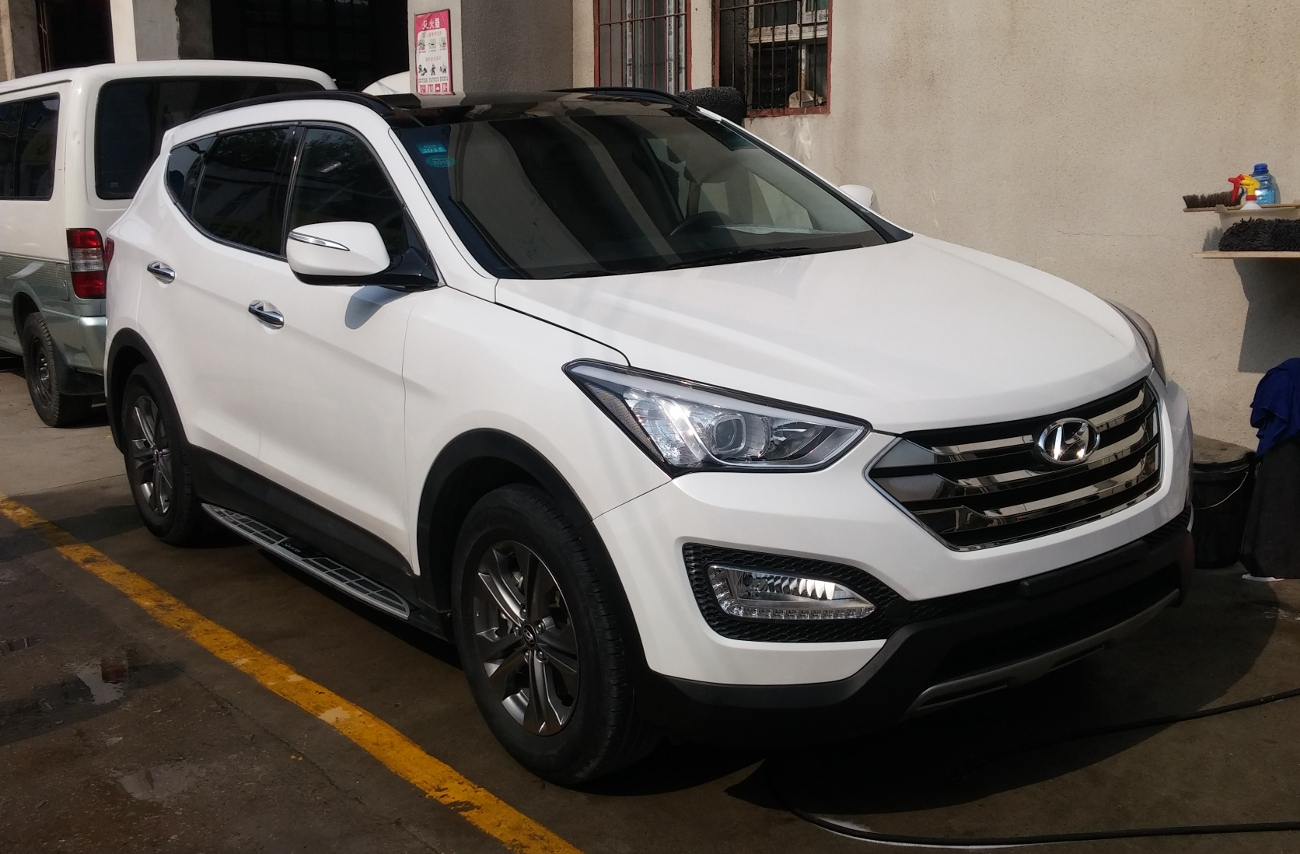
2013
现代圣达菲 (进口)
Hyundai Santa Fe DM (imported)

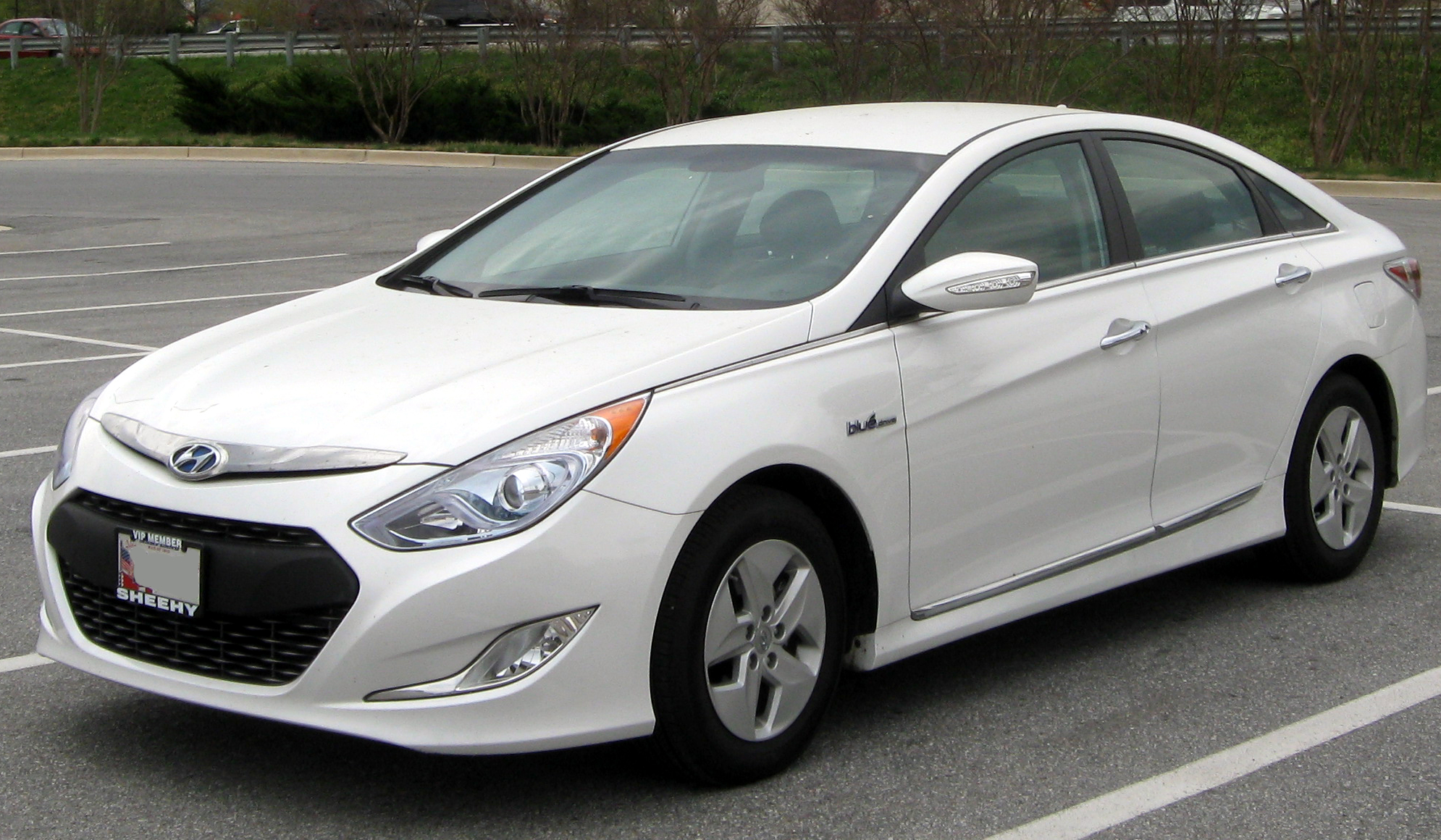
2014
现代索纳塔Hybrid
Hyundai Sonata Hybrid

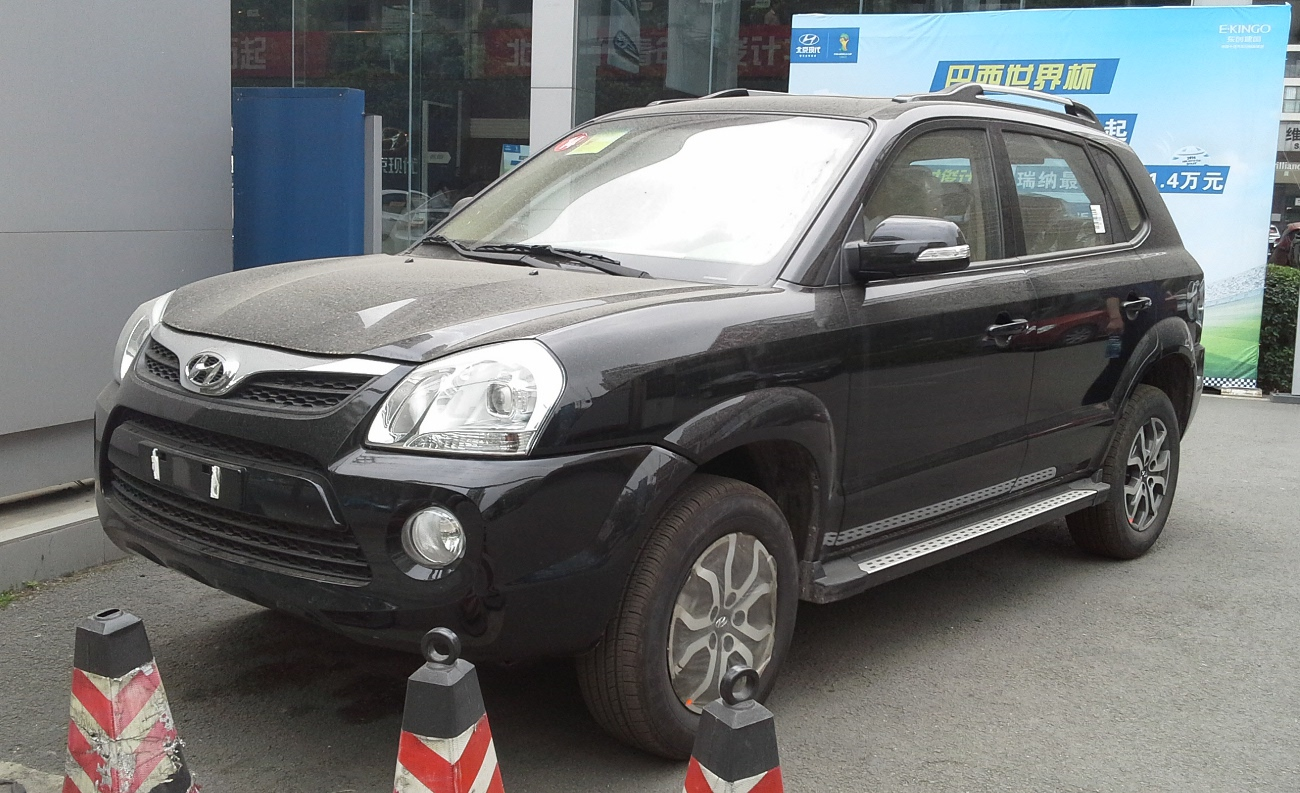
2005
现代途胜 (进口)
Hyundai Tucson JM (imported)

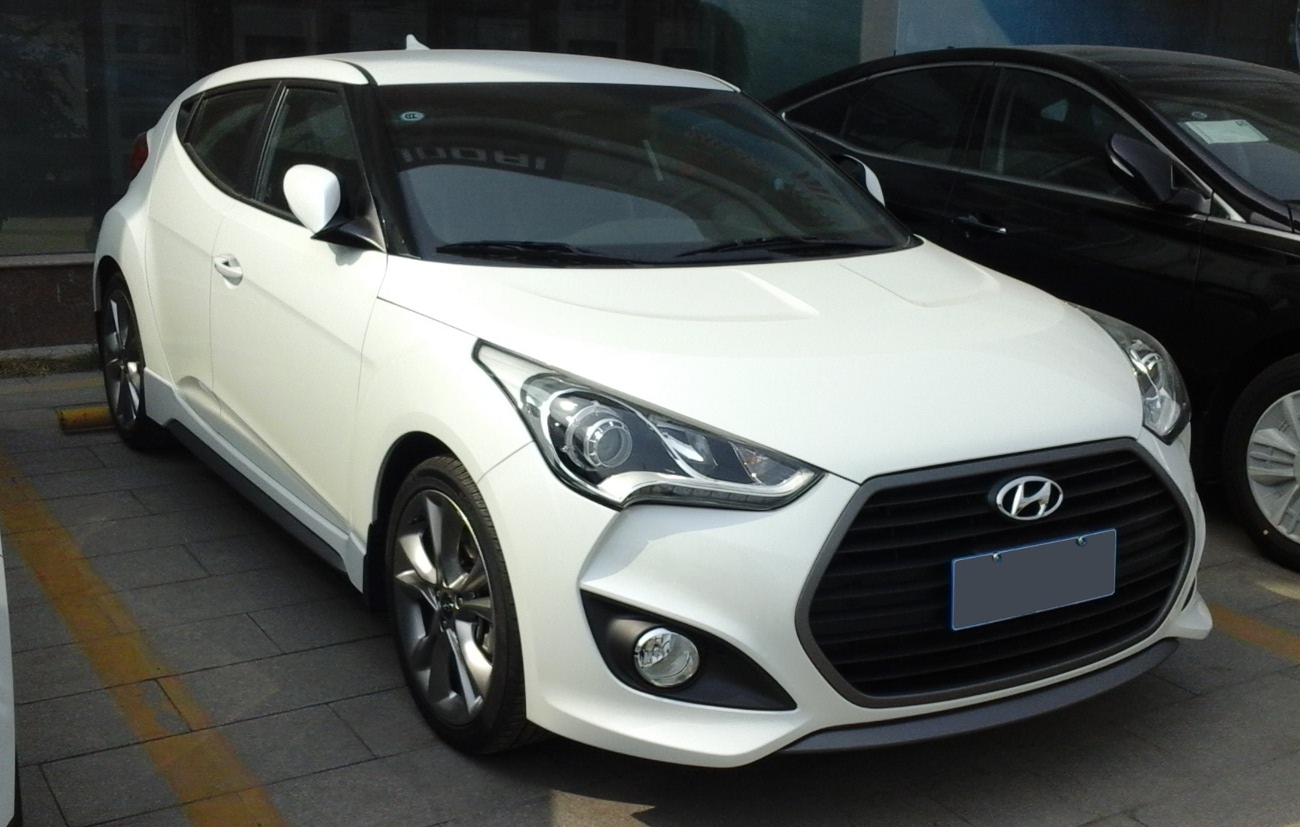
2011–2015
现代Veloster
Hyundai Veloster

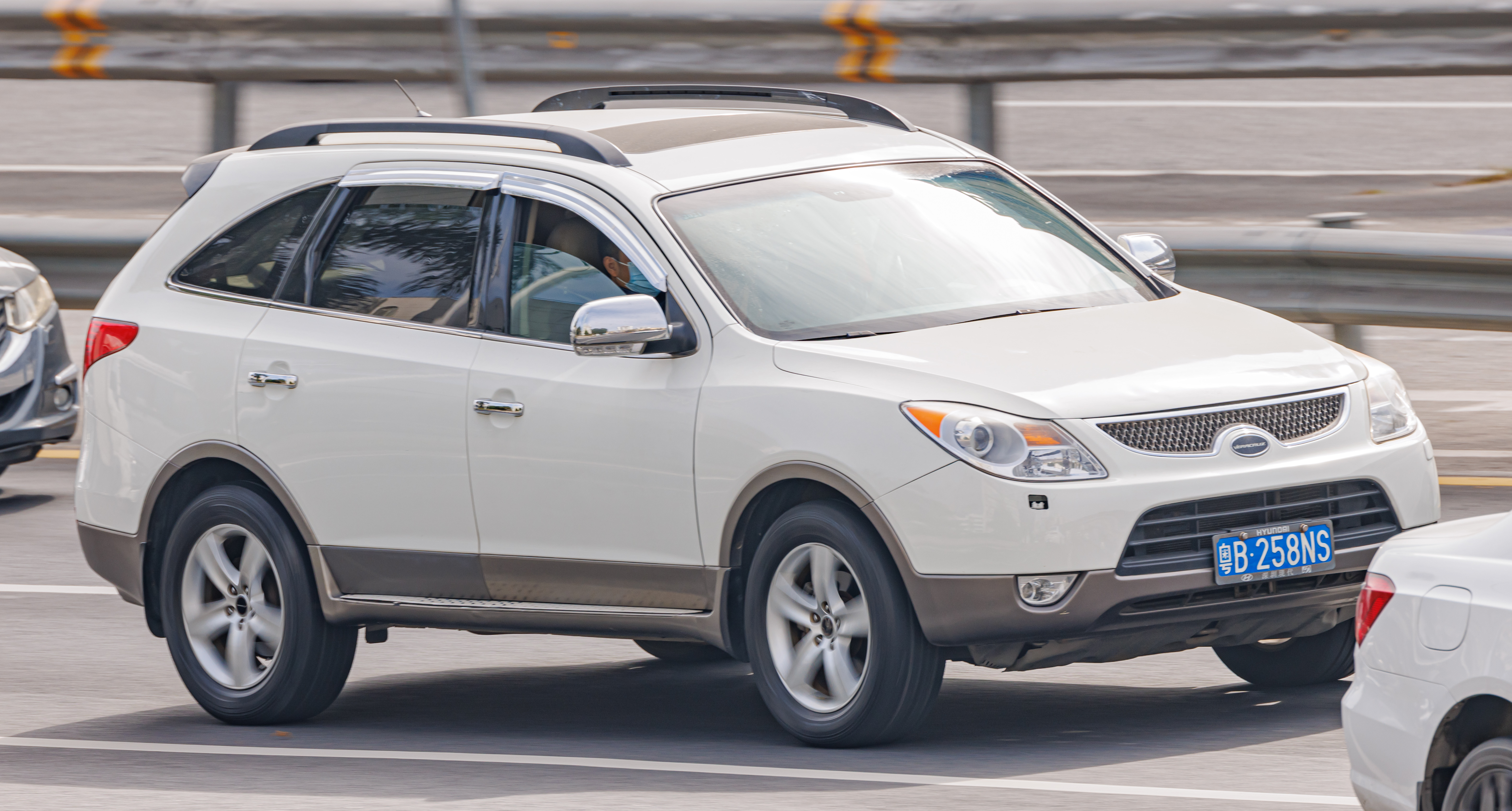
2007–2012
现代维拉克斯
Hyundai Veracruz

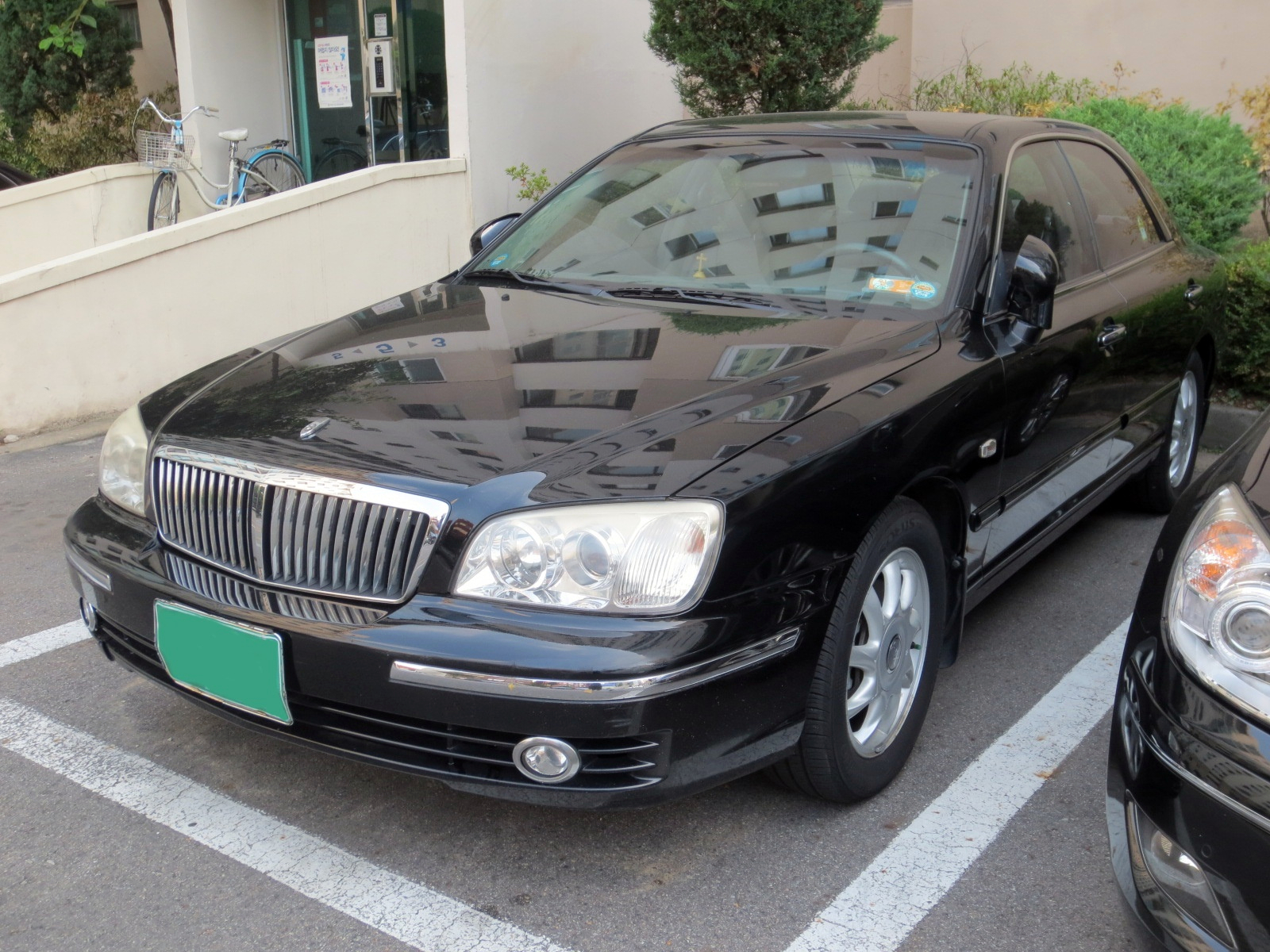
2004
现代XG250
Hyundai XG250

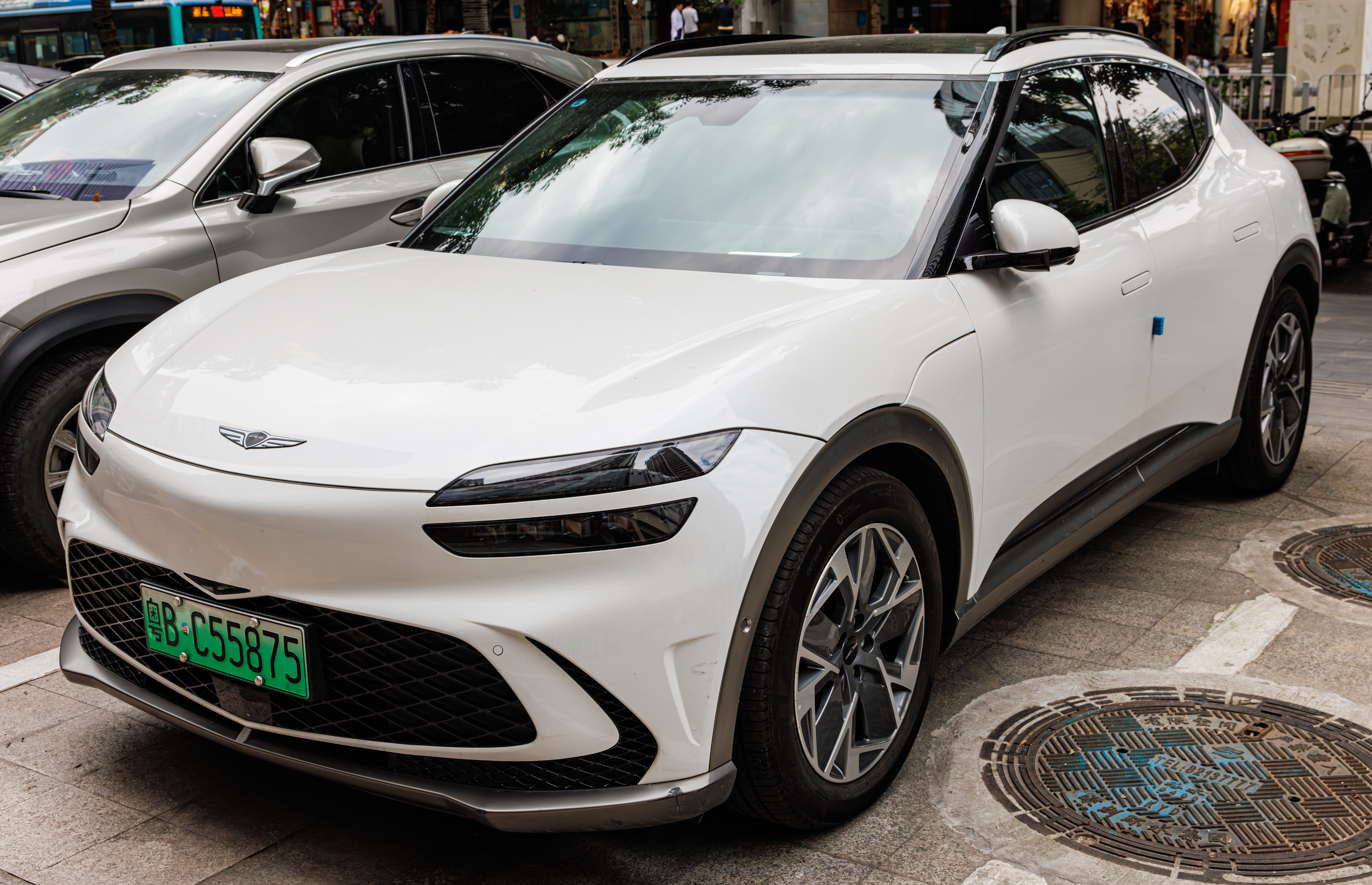
2021–2025
捷恩斯 GV60
Genesis GV60

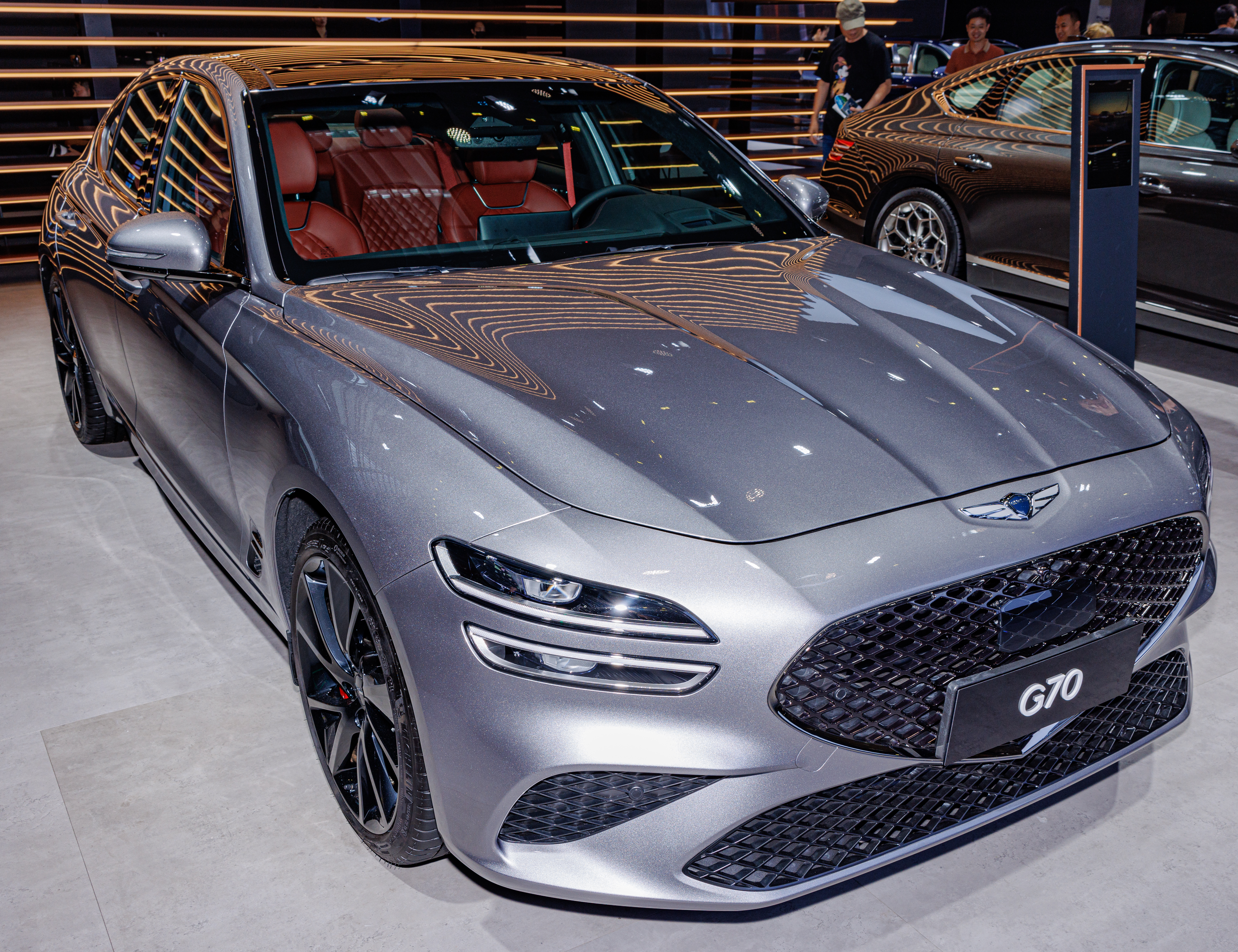
2021–2025
捷恩斯 G70
Genesis G70

== Production bases and facilities ==
As of 2013, the company has at least three production bases as well as an R&D center, all of which are probably in the Linhe Industrial Development Zone of the Shunyi District, a satellite city of Beijing. Two of these produce automobiles and the other, engines.

Its first automobile production base was completed in 2003 and the second in April 2008. Construction on a third Beijing base begun in late 2010 should be complete in the second half of 2012. At least one of these facilities is 17 km from Shunyi Yangzhen.

A new site outside Beijing was inaugurated in 2016, and this Hebei location was producing a small city car, the Accent, as of 2017.

In 2017, Beijing Hyundai opened its Chongqing plant, which produces the Reina subcompact sedan until 2021.

== See also ==
- List of Hyundai Motor Company manufacturing facilities
