= Hyundai-Kia N platforms =

Overview
- Manufacturer: Hyundai; Kia
- Production: 2014–present

Body and chassis
- Class: Mid-size car (D); Full-size car Minivan (M); Compact pickup truck Mid-size crossover SUV
- Layout: Front-engine, front-wheel-drive Front-engine, all-wheel-drive
- Platform: N1/N2; N3/N4

Chronology
- Predecessor: Hyundai-Kia Y platforms

The N platform series, currently consisting of the N3 and N3 eK platforms, are platforms developed by Hyundai for its range of front-wheel drive-based mid-size (D-segment) automobiles since 2014.

== N1/N2 platform ==
The N1/N2 platform was introduced in 2014 with the seventh generation Hyundai Sonata.

- Hyundai Sonata (LF) (2014–2019)
- Hyundai Lafesta (2018–2024)
- Hyundai Grandeur/Azera (IG) (pre-facelift, 2016–2020)
- Hyundai Santa Fe (TM) (pre-facelift, 2018–2020)
- Kia Optima/K5 (JF) (2015–2020)
- Kia K7/Cadenza (YG) (2016–2021)
- Kia Sorento (UM) (2015–2020)
- Kia KX7 (2017–2021)
- Hyundai Palisade (LX2) (2018-2024)
- Kia Telluride (2020-2026)
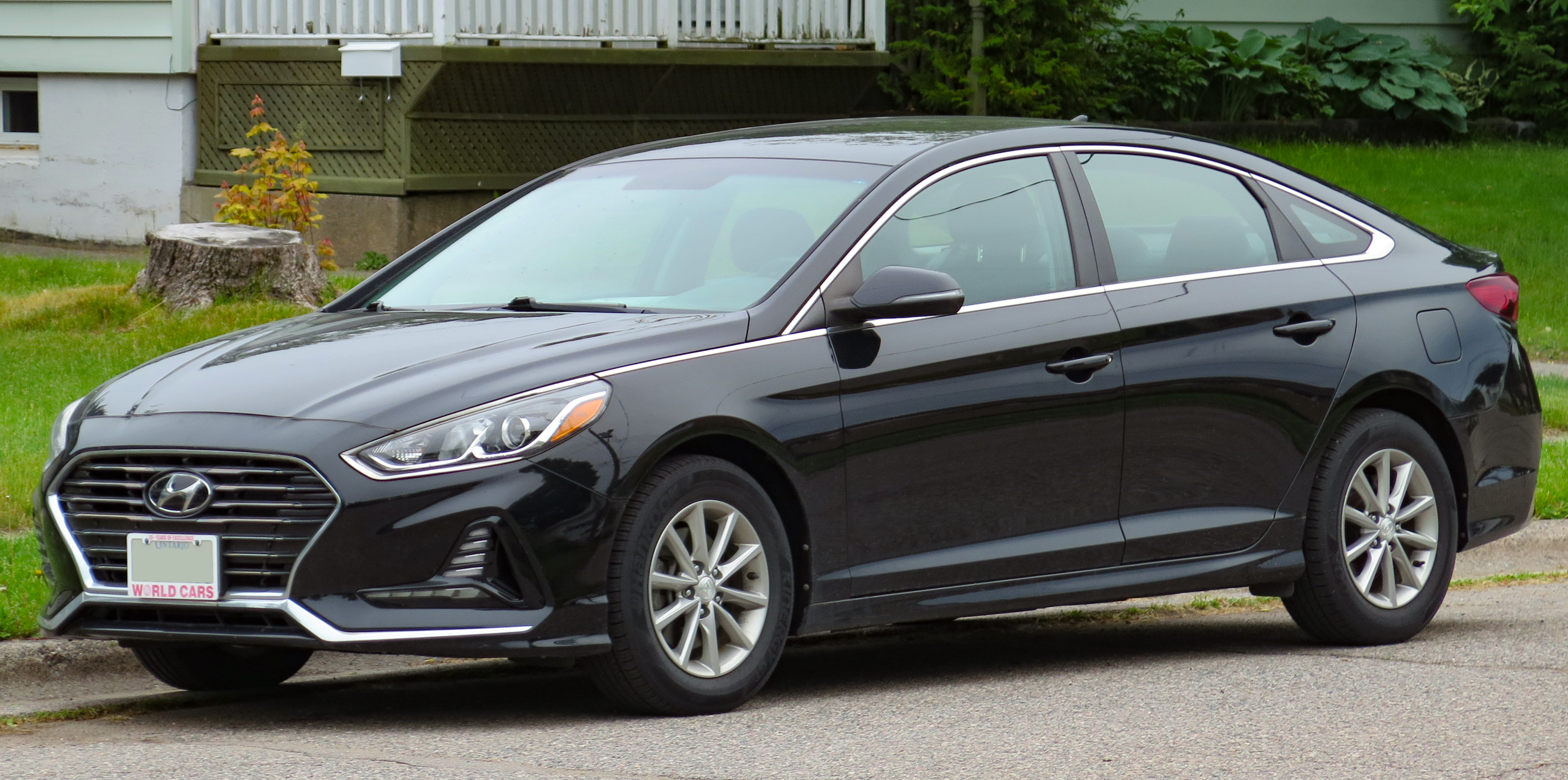
Hyundai Sonata (LF)

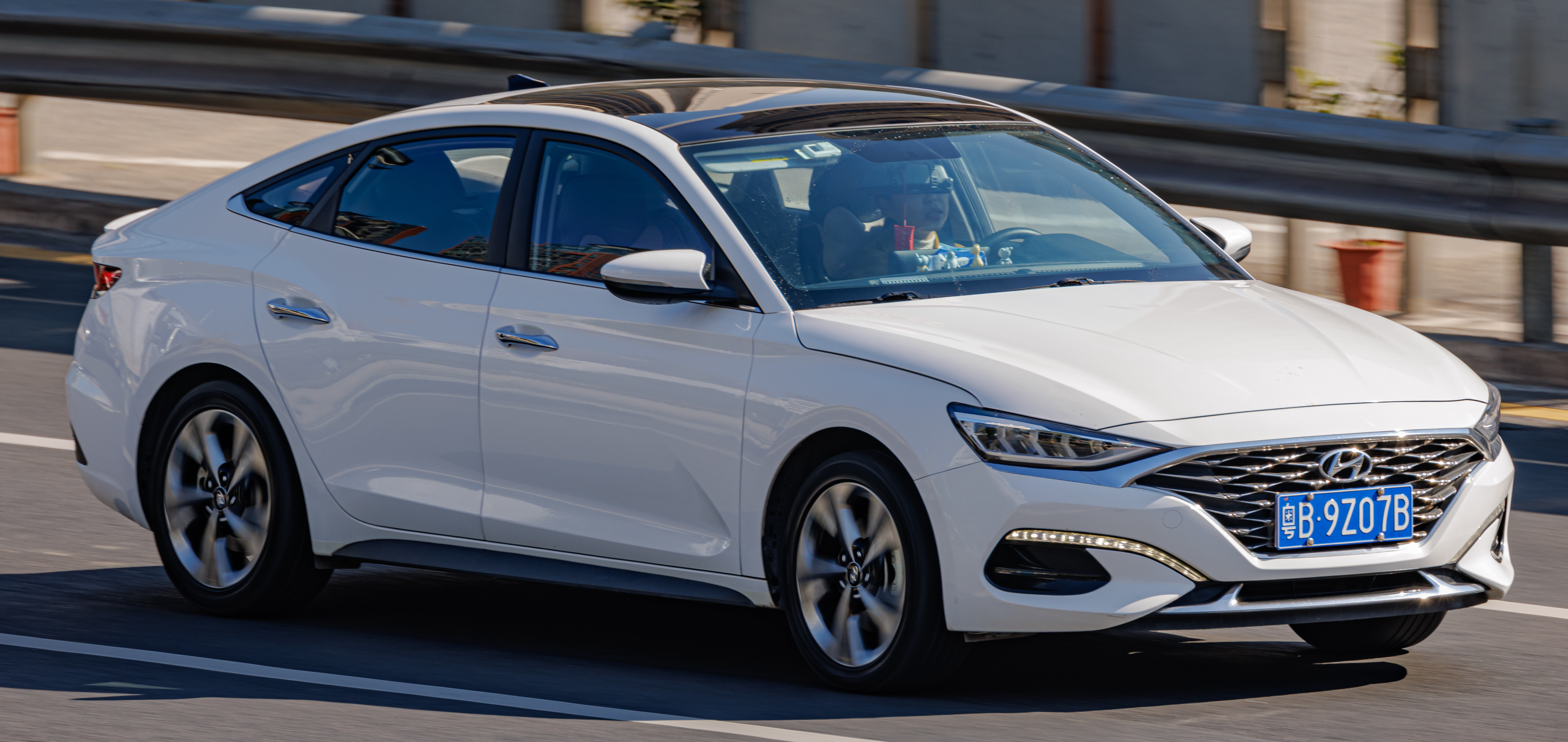
Hyundai Lafesta

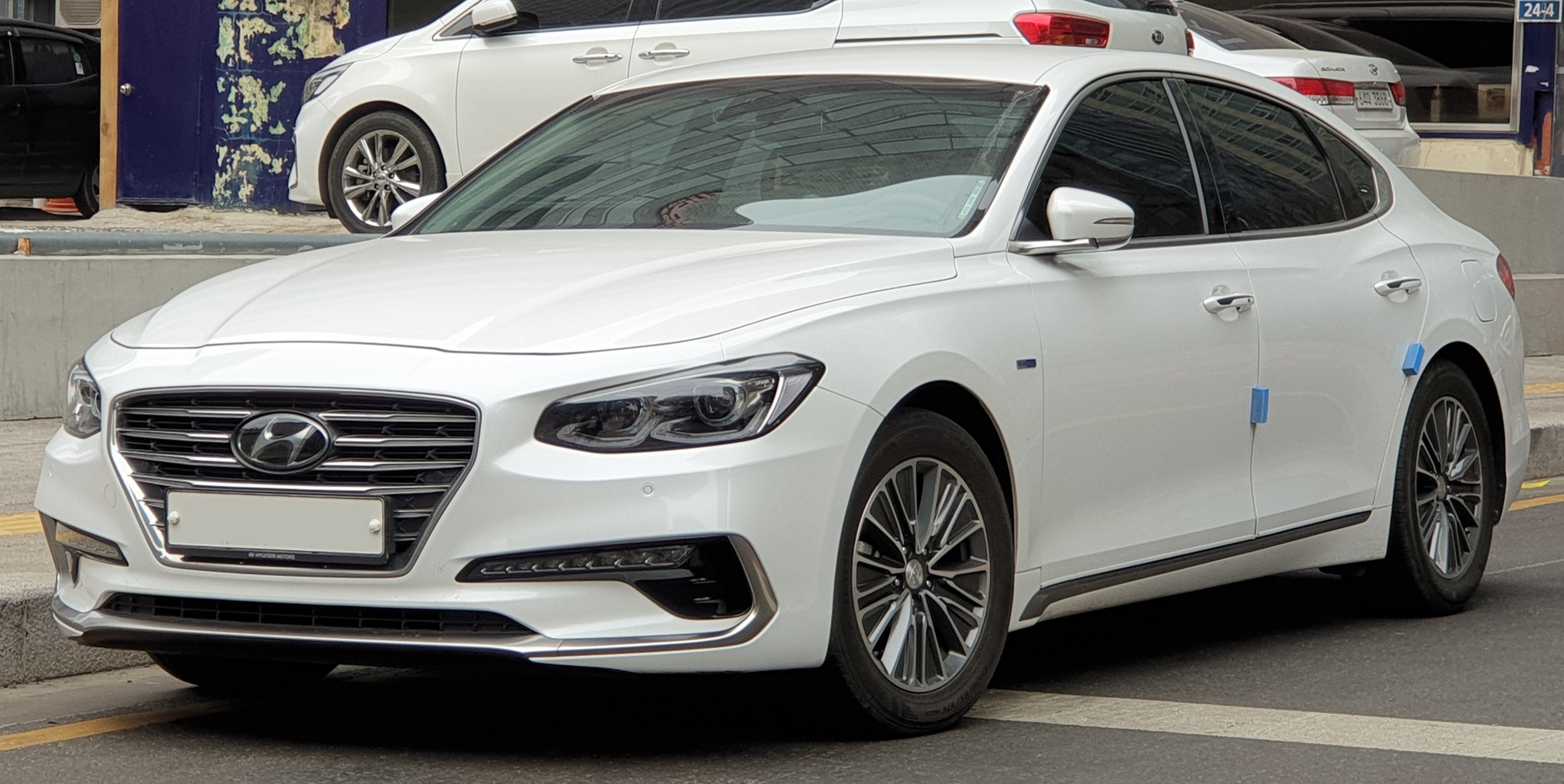
Hyundai Grandeur/Azera (IG; pre-facelift)

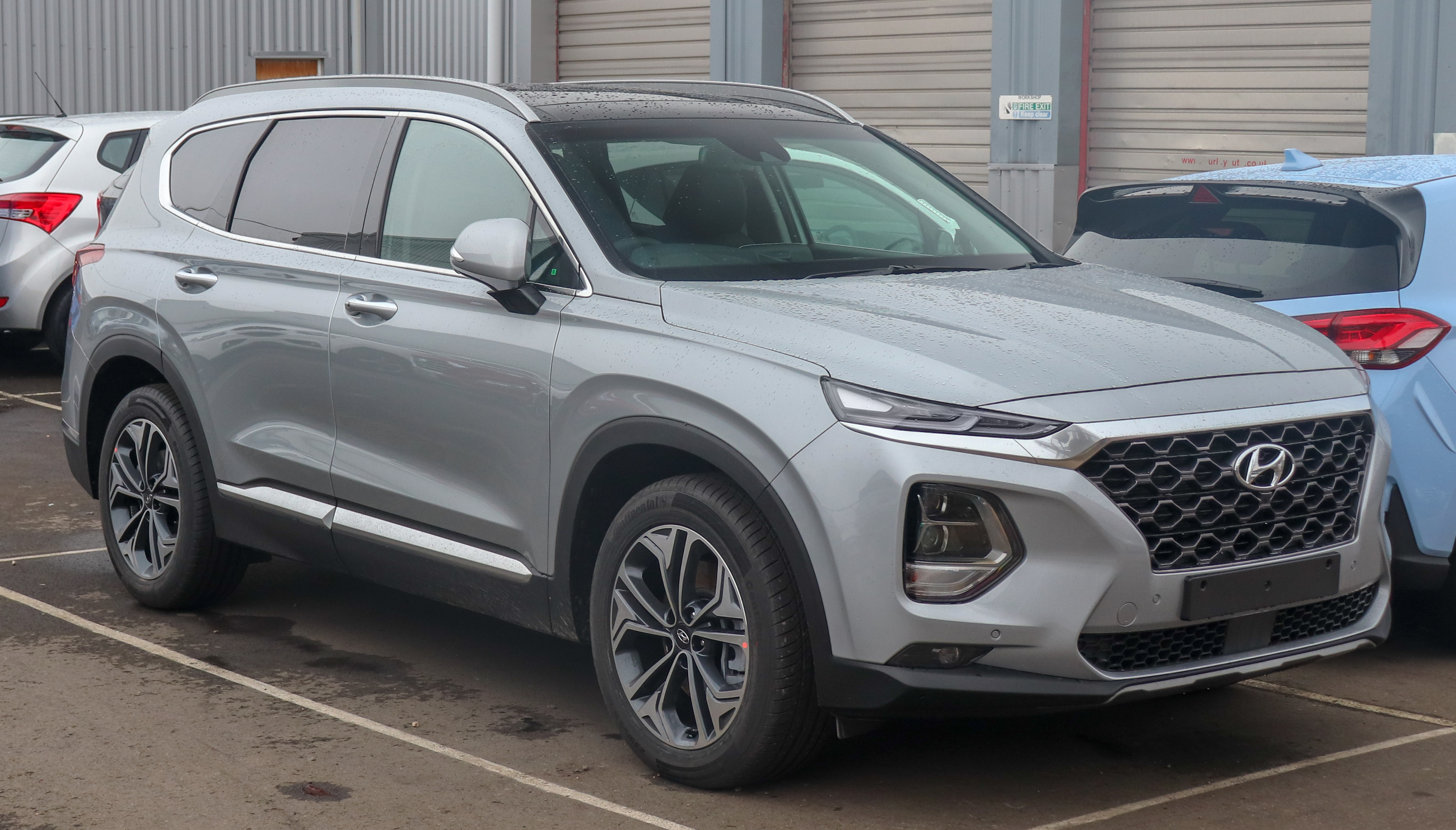
Hyundai Santa Fe (TM; pre-facelift)

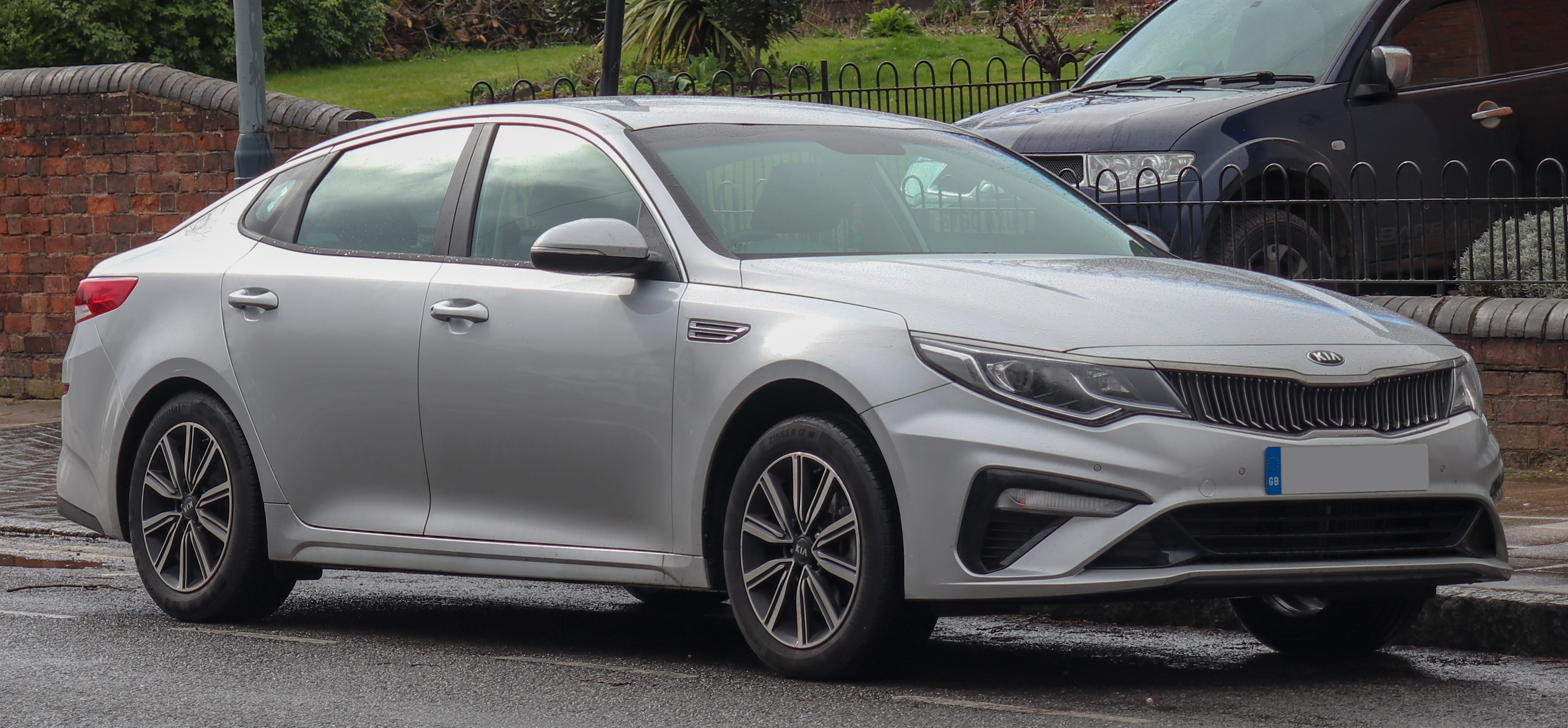
Kia Optima/K5 (JF)

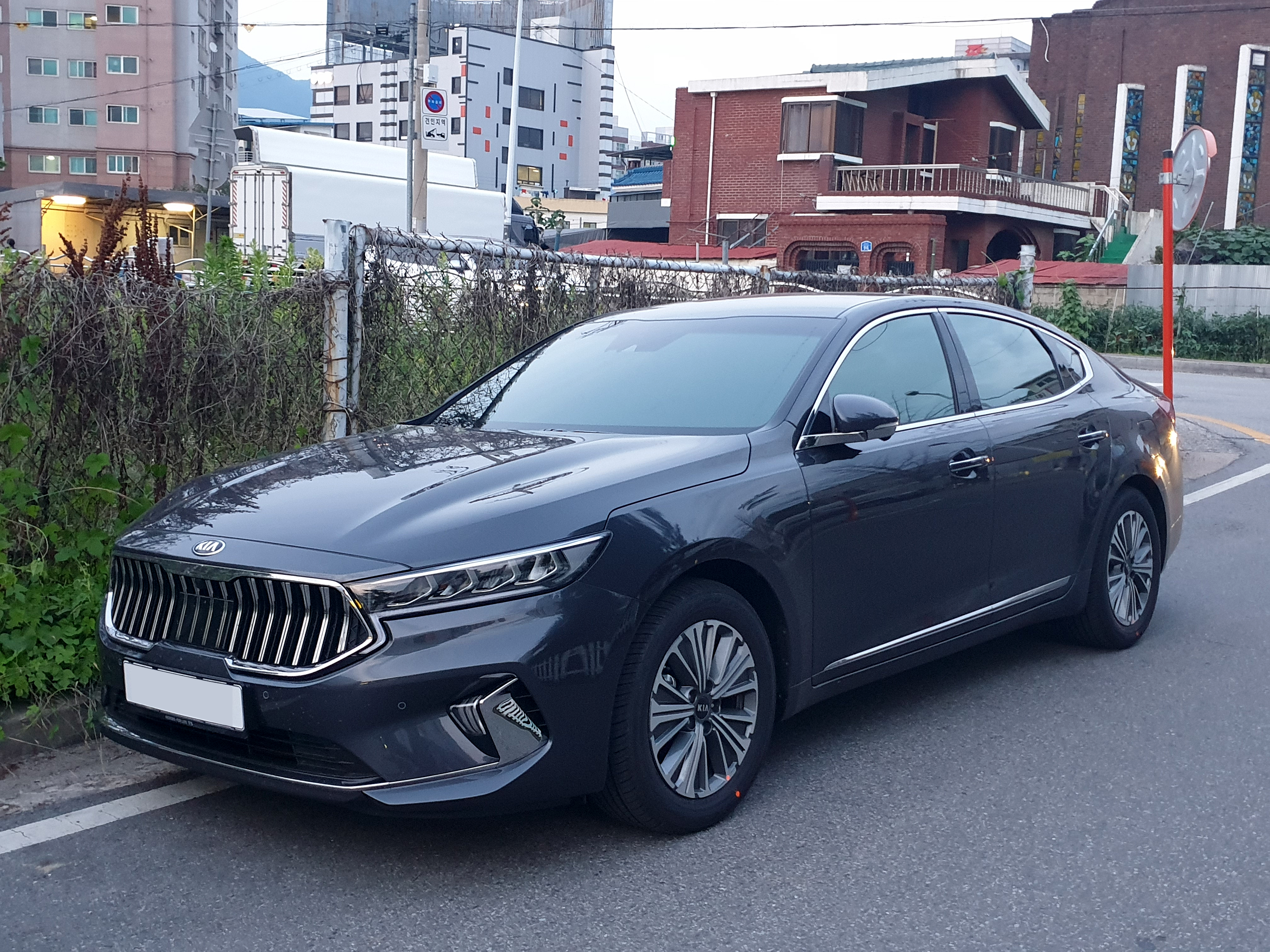
Kia K7/Cadenza (YG)

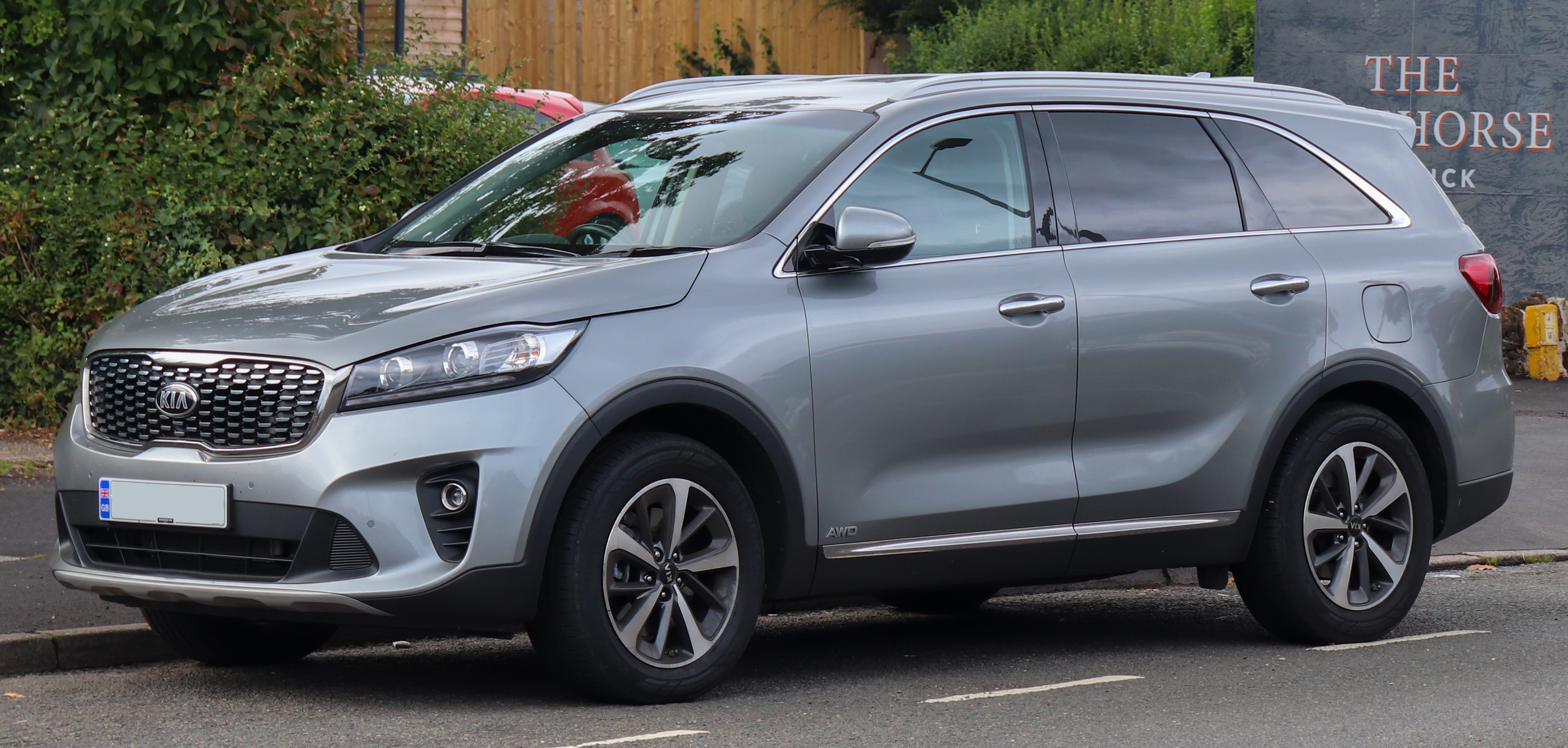
Kia Sorento (UM)

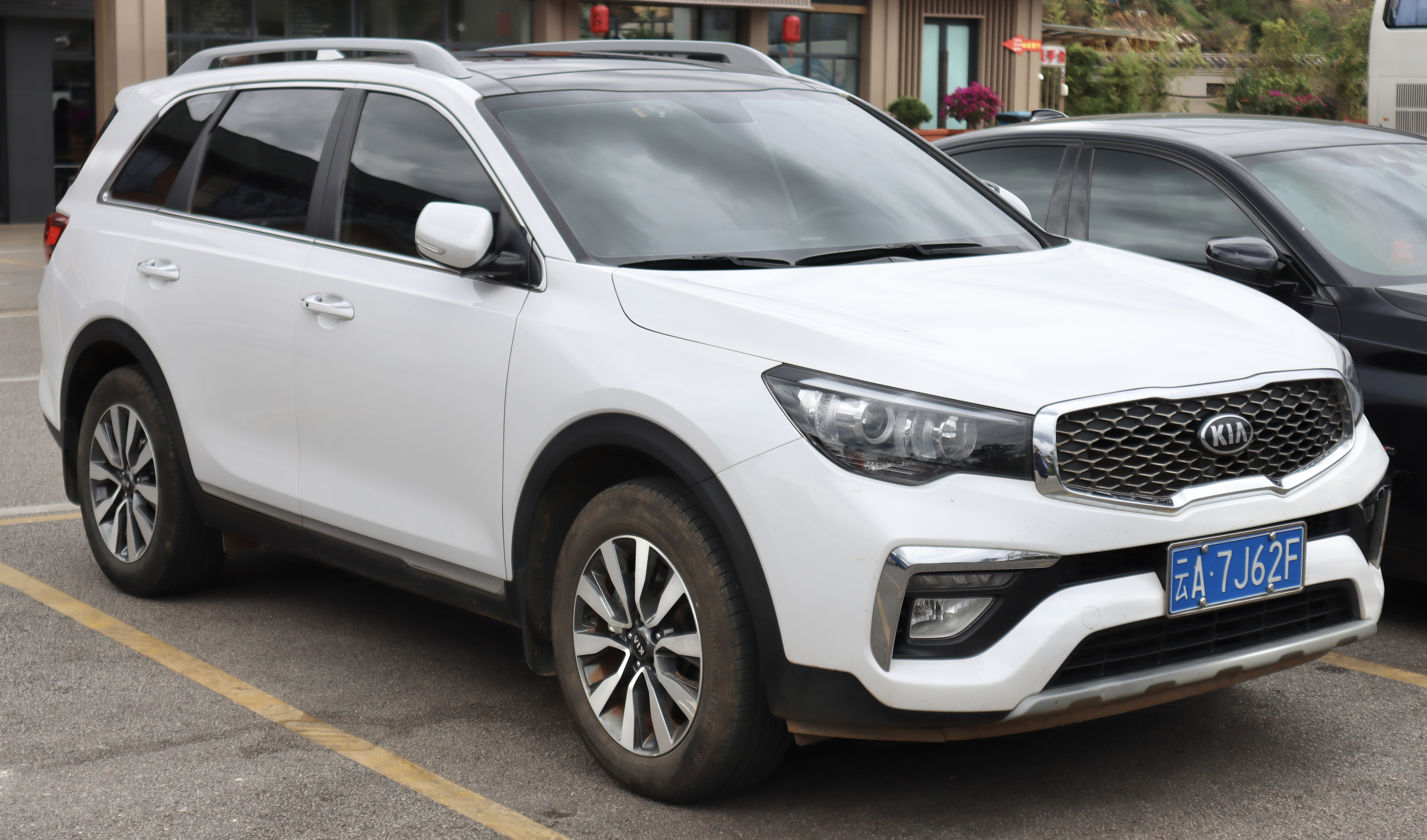
Kia KX7

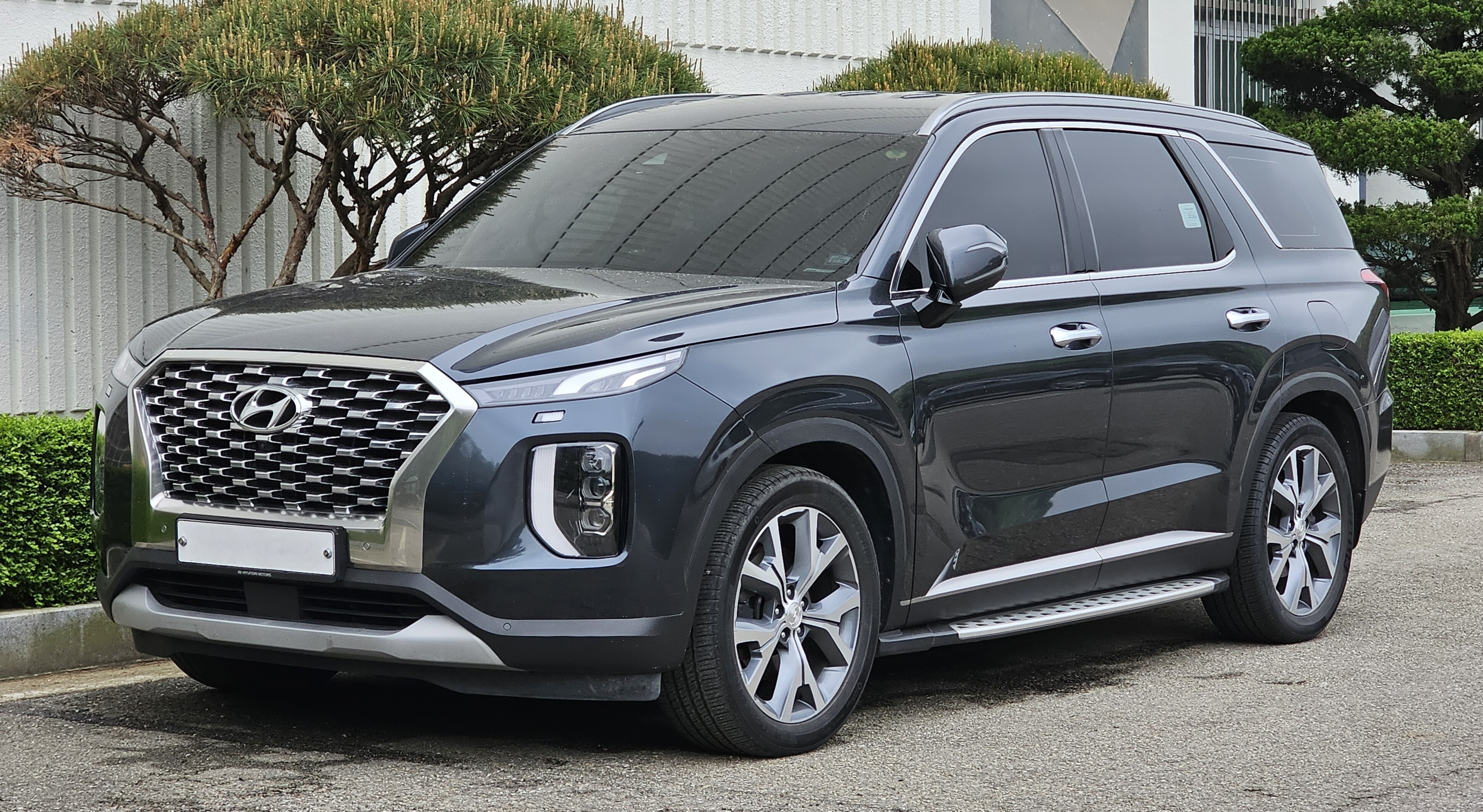
Hyundai Palisade (LX2)

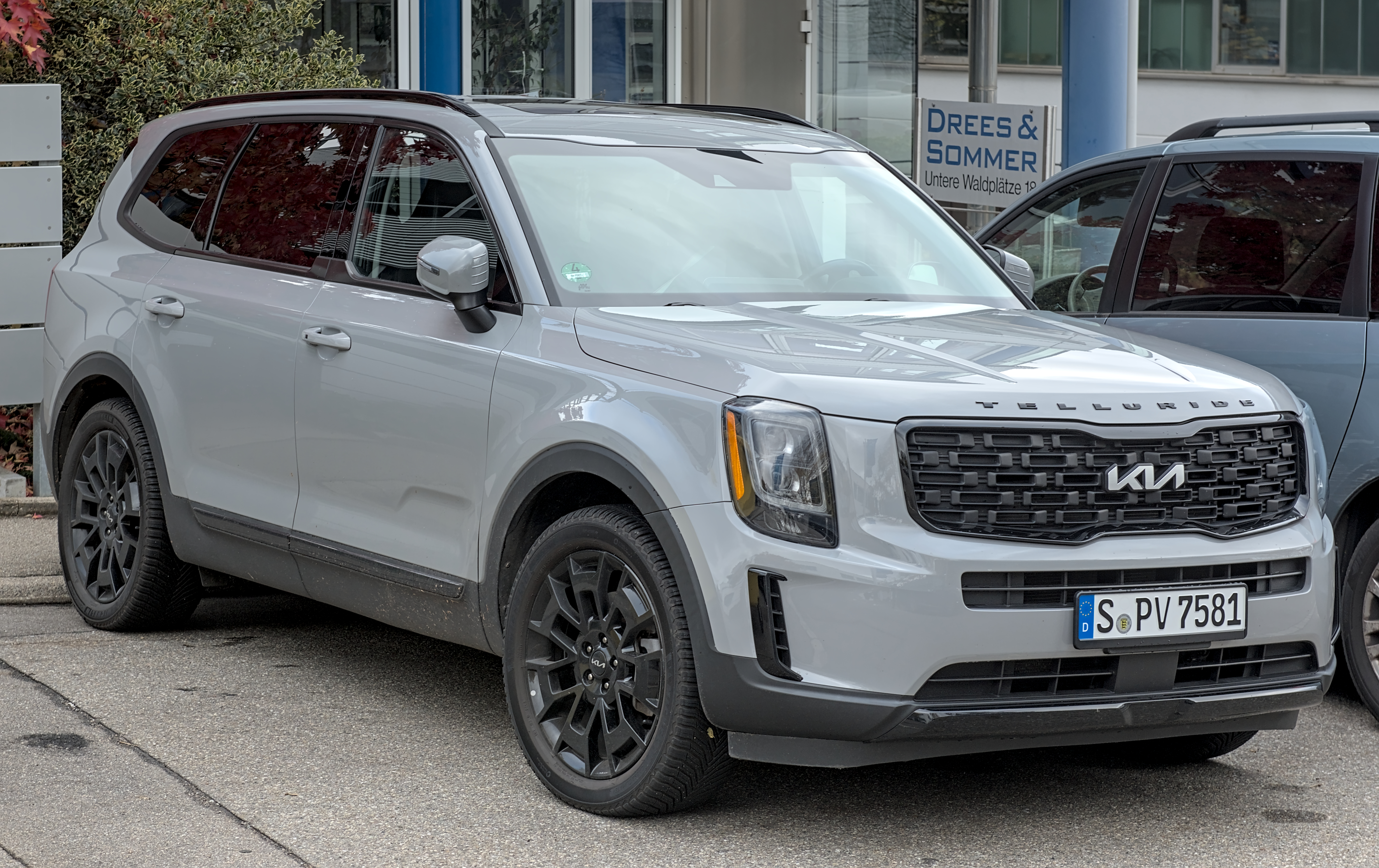
Kia Telluride (ON)

== N3/N4 platform ==
The N3/N4 platform was introduced in 2019 with the eighth generation Hyundai Sonata, dubbed as the 'third-generation platform'.

Vehicles using platform (calendar years):

- Hyundai Custo/Custin (KU) (2021–present)
- Hyundai Grandeur (IG) (facelift, 2020–2022)
- Hyundai Grandeur (GN7) (2022–present)
- Hyundai Mistra (DU2) (2020–2023)
- Hyundai Mufasa (NU2) (2023–present)
- Hyundai ST1 (A01) (2024–present)
- Hyundai Santa Cruz (NX4a OB) (2021–present)
- Hyundai Santa Fe (TM PE) (facelift, 2020–2023)
- Hyundai Sonata (DN8) (2019–present)
- Hyundai Santa Fe (MX5) (2023–present)
- Hyundai Staria (US4) (2021–present)
- Hyundai Tucson (NX4) (2020–present)
- Kia Carnival (KA4) (2020–present)
- Kia K5 (DL3) (2019–present)
- Kia K8 (GL3) (2021–present)
- Kia Sorento (MQ4) (2020–present)
- Kia Sportage (NQ5) (2021–present)
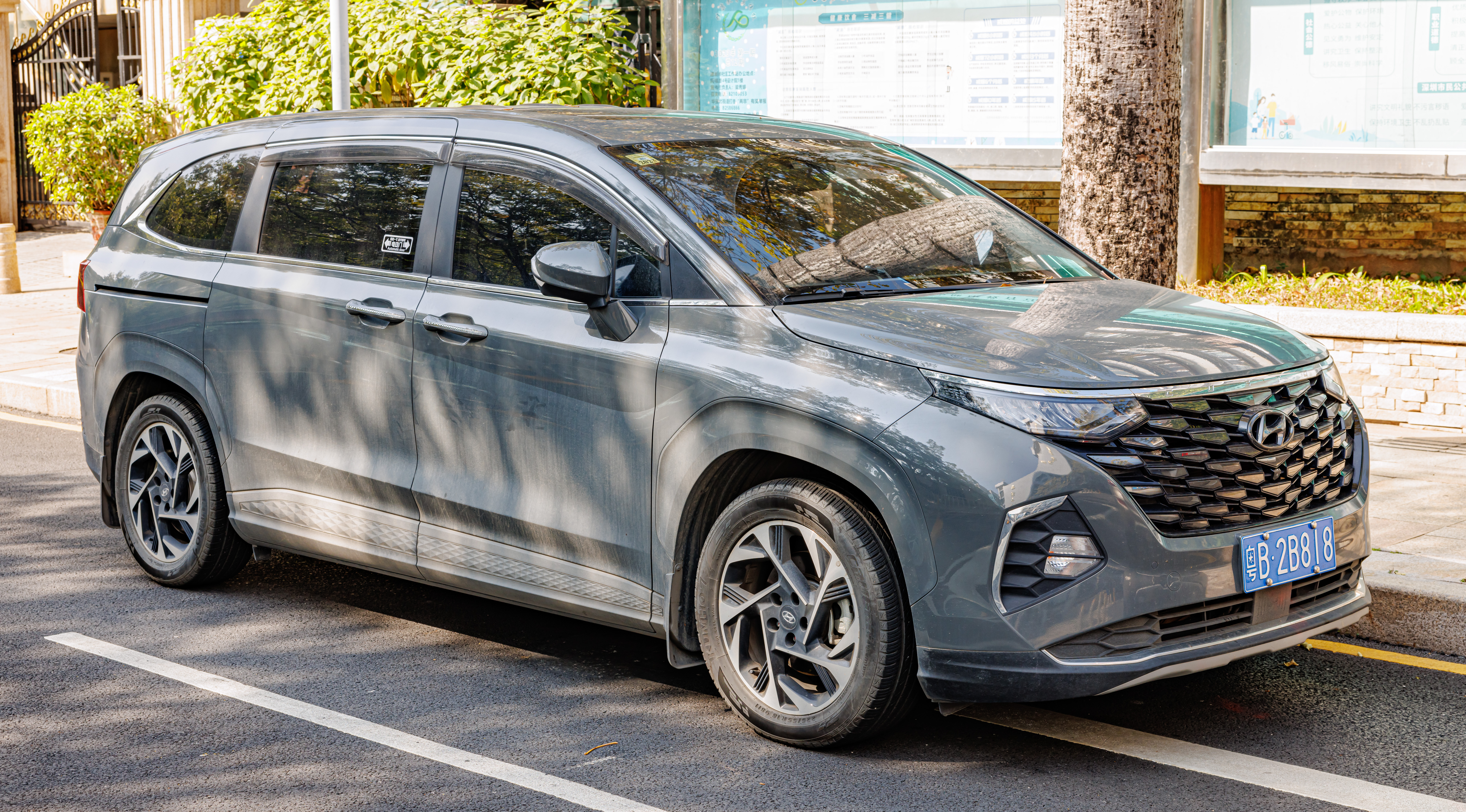
Hyundai Custo (KU)

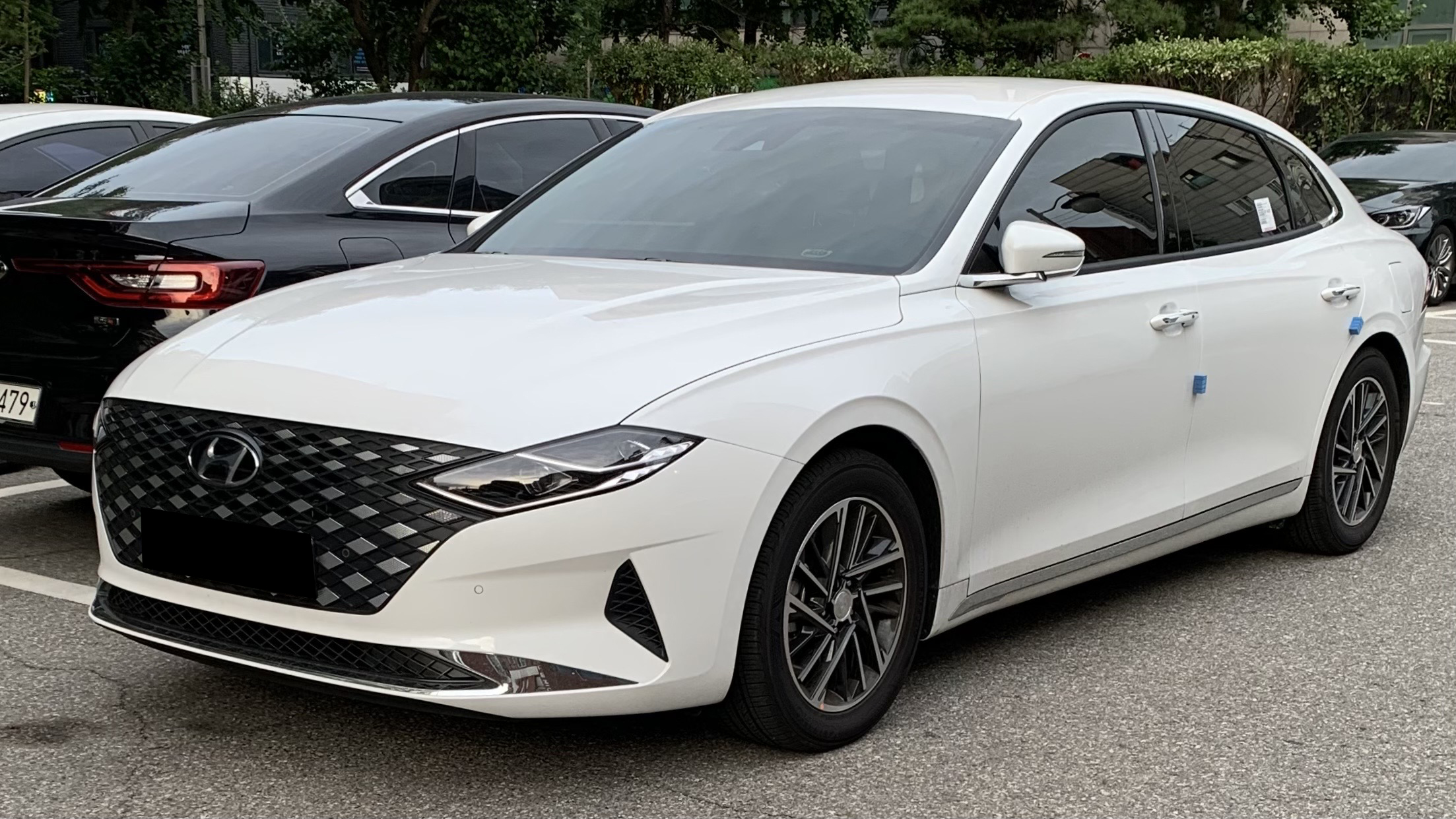
Hyundai Grandeur (IG; facelift)

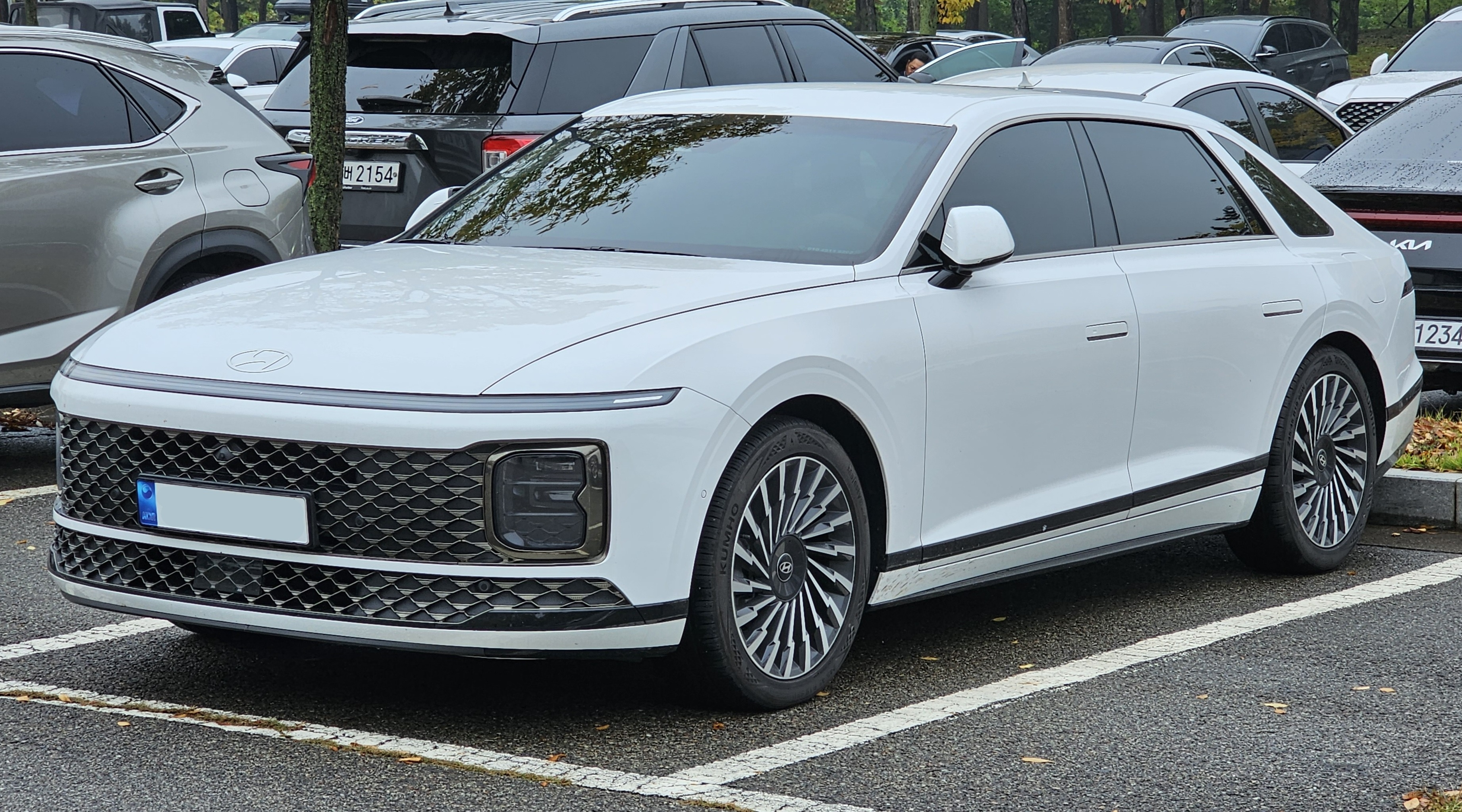
Hyundai Grandeur (GN7)

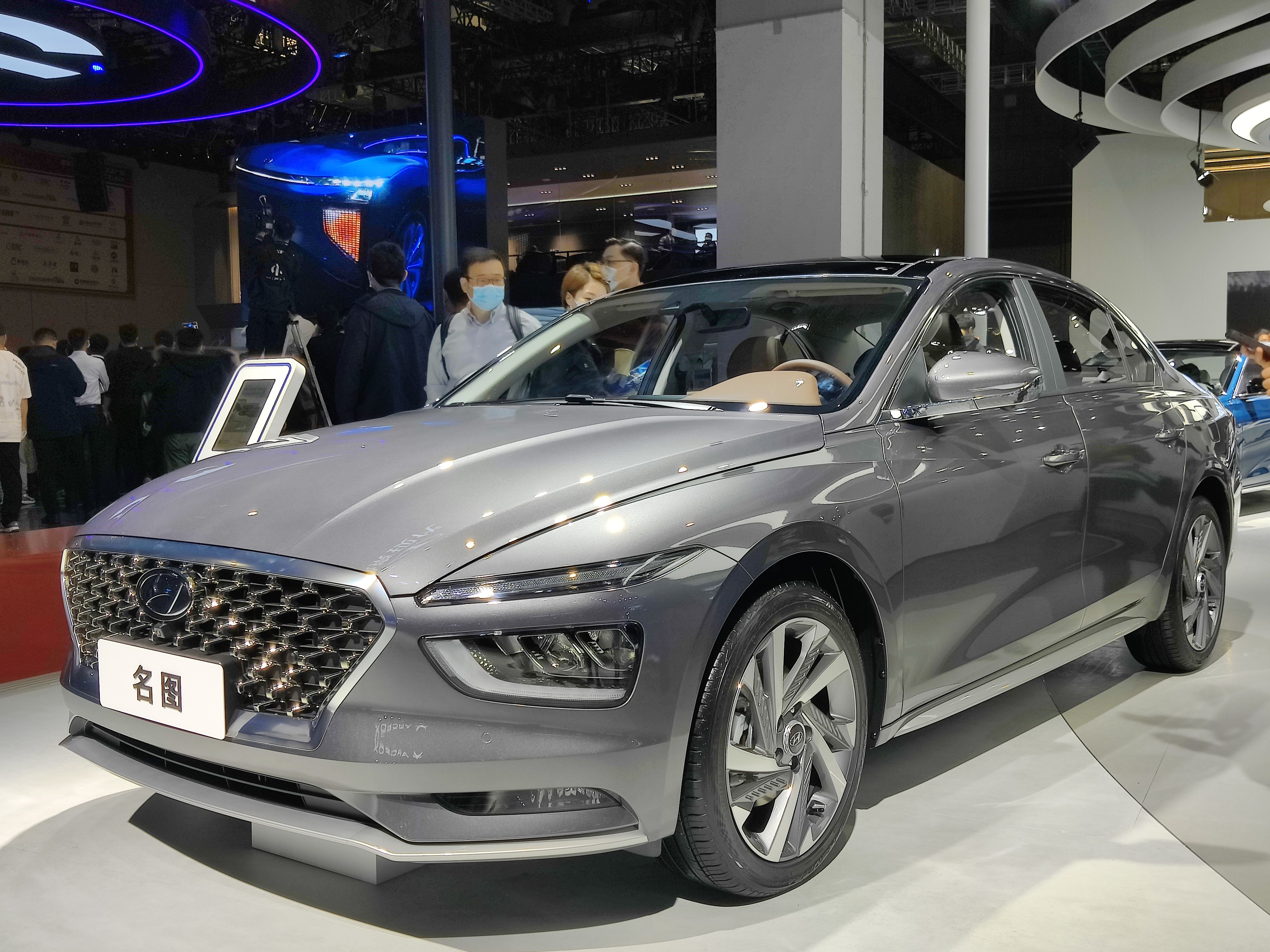
Hyundai Mistra (DU2)

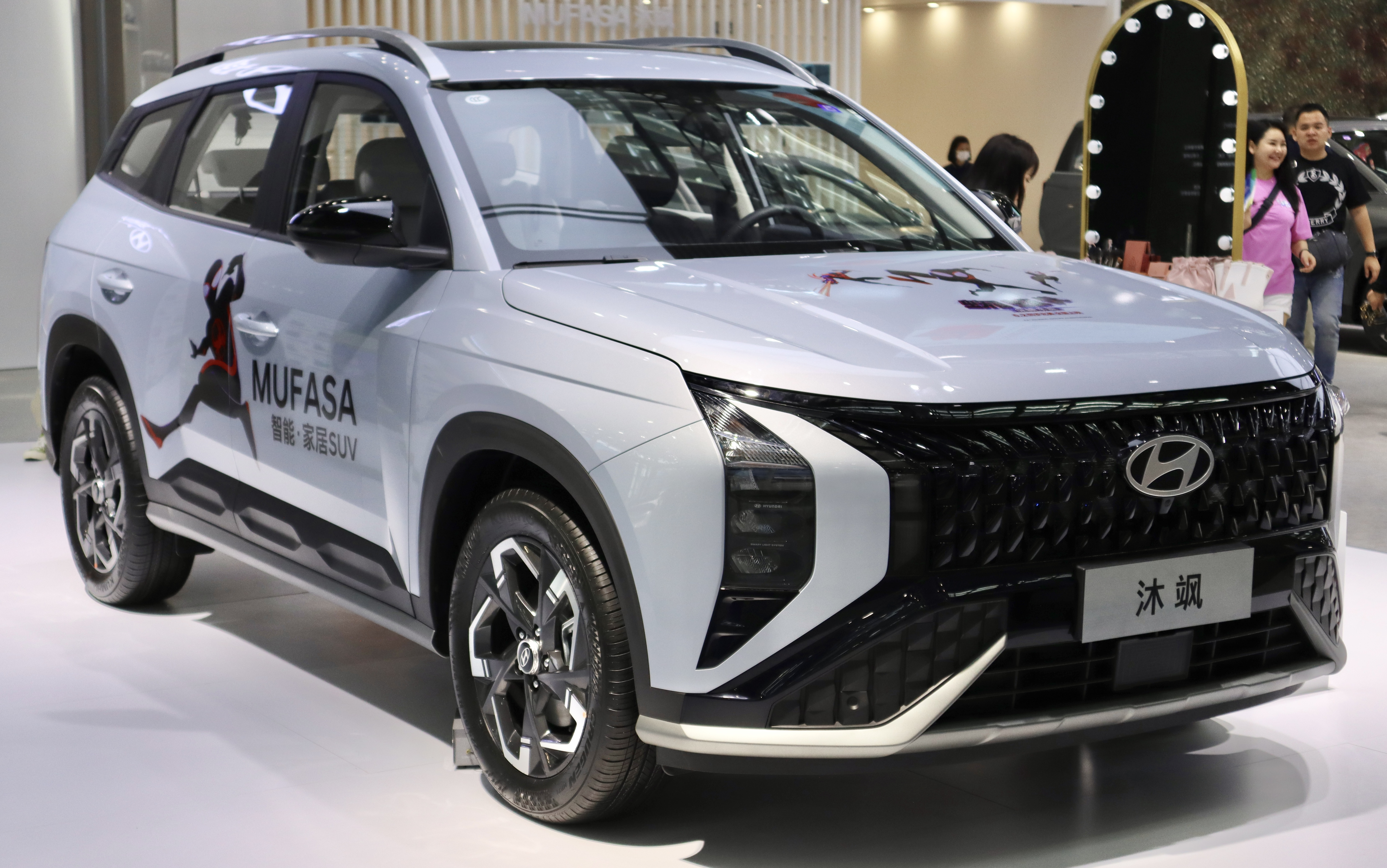
Hyundai Mufasa (NU2)

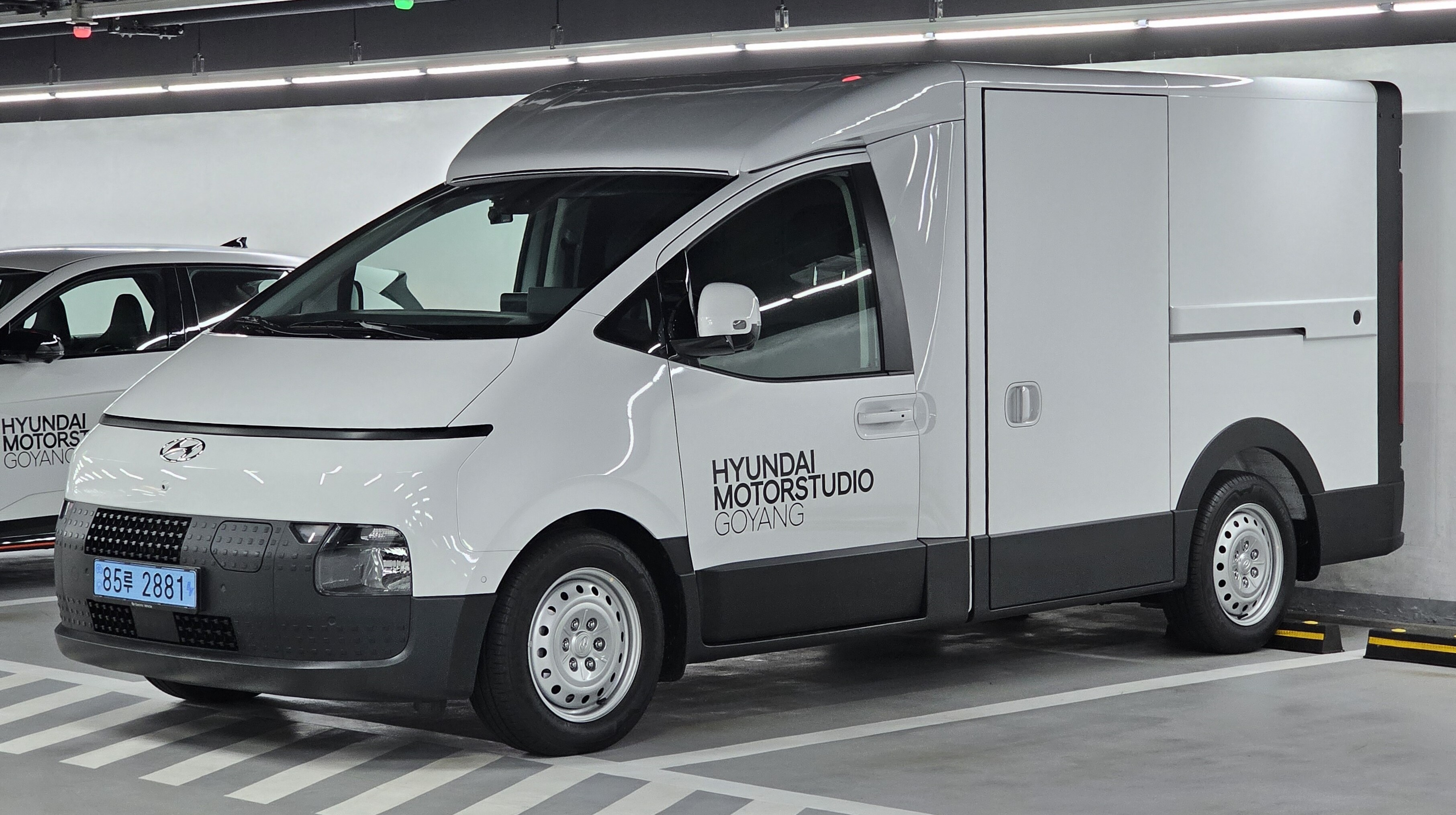
Hyundai ST1 (A01)

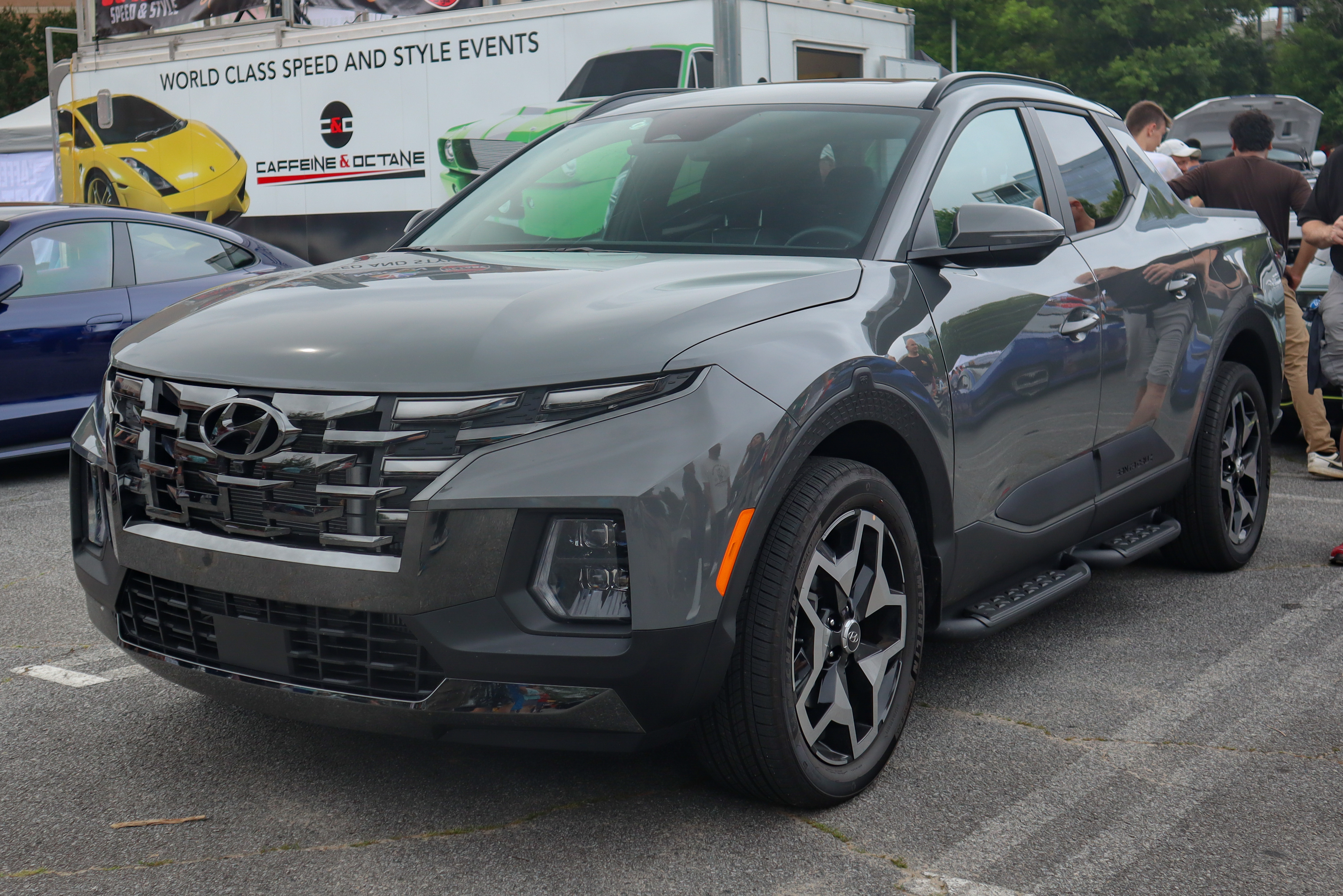
Hyundai Santa Cruz (NX4A OB)

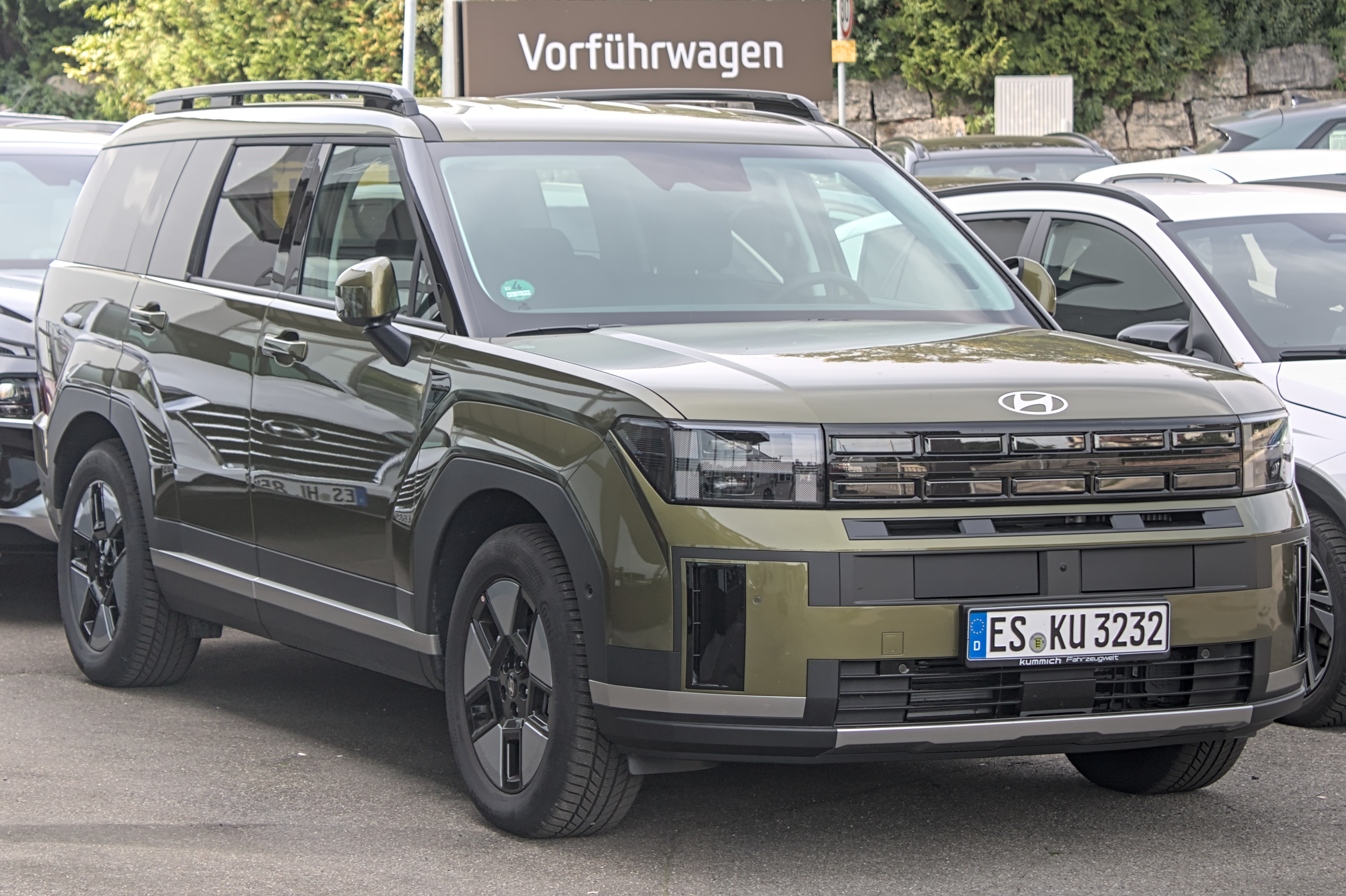
Hyundai Santa Fe (MX5)

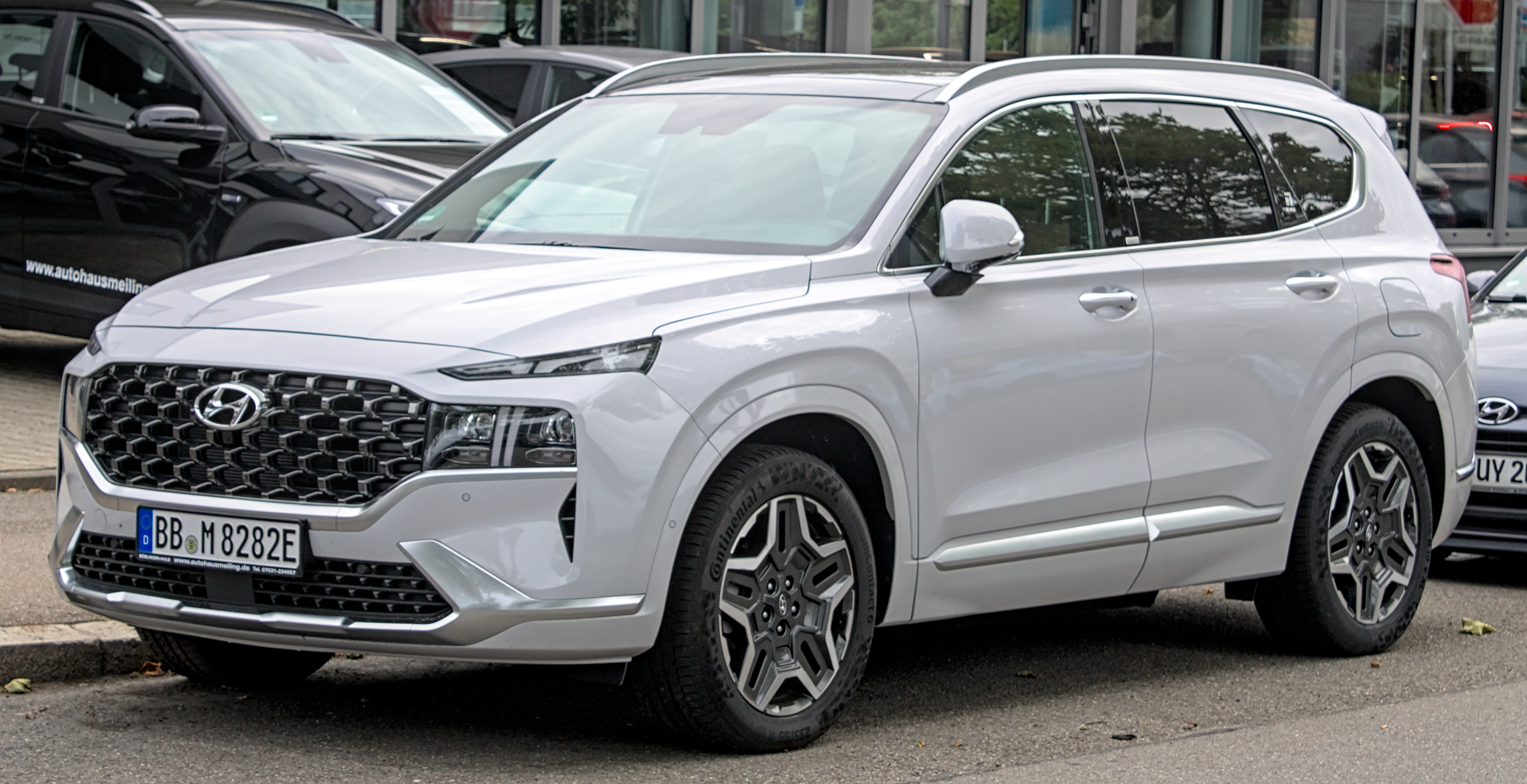
Hyundai Santa Fe (TM; facelift)

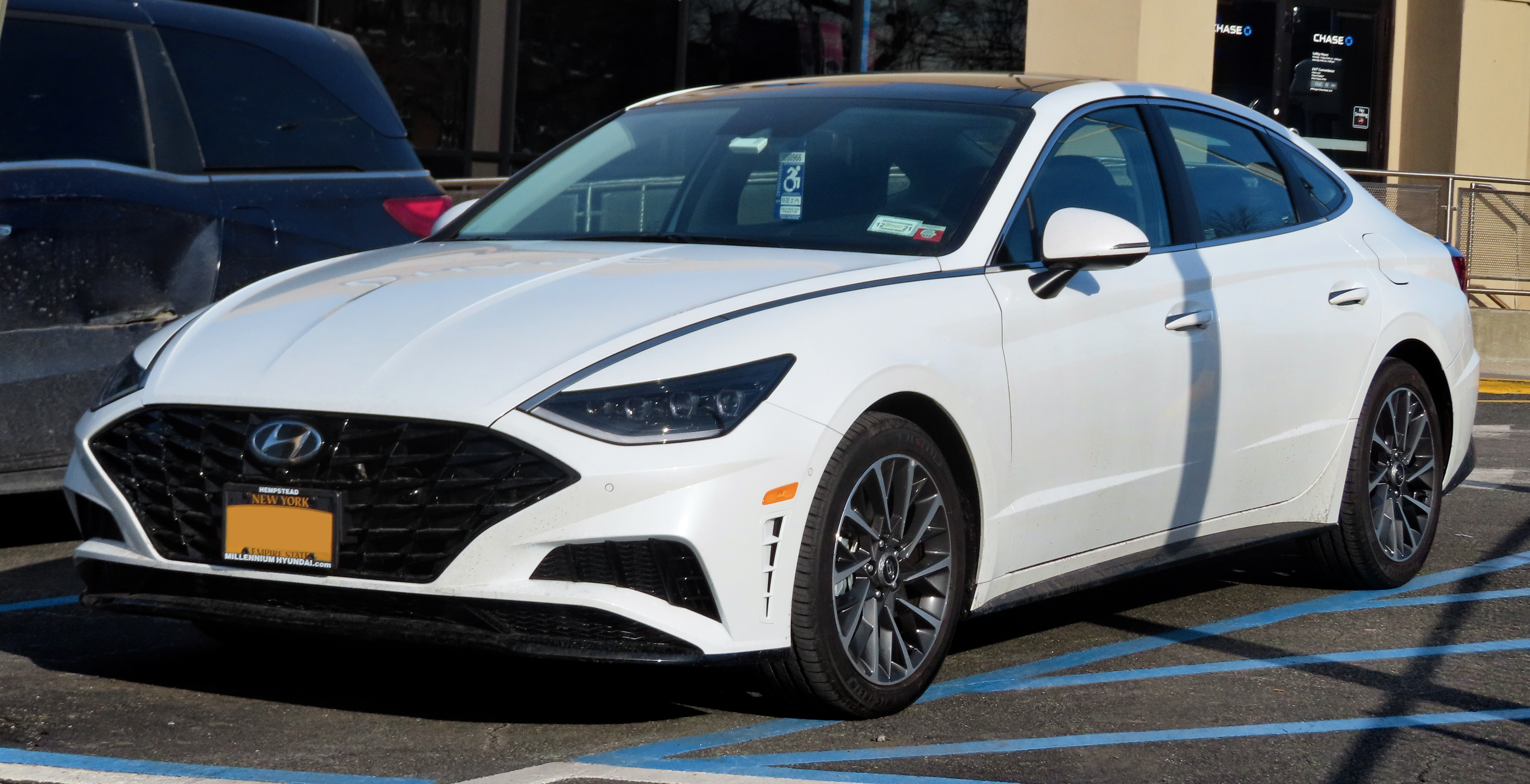
Hyundai Sonata (DN8)

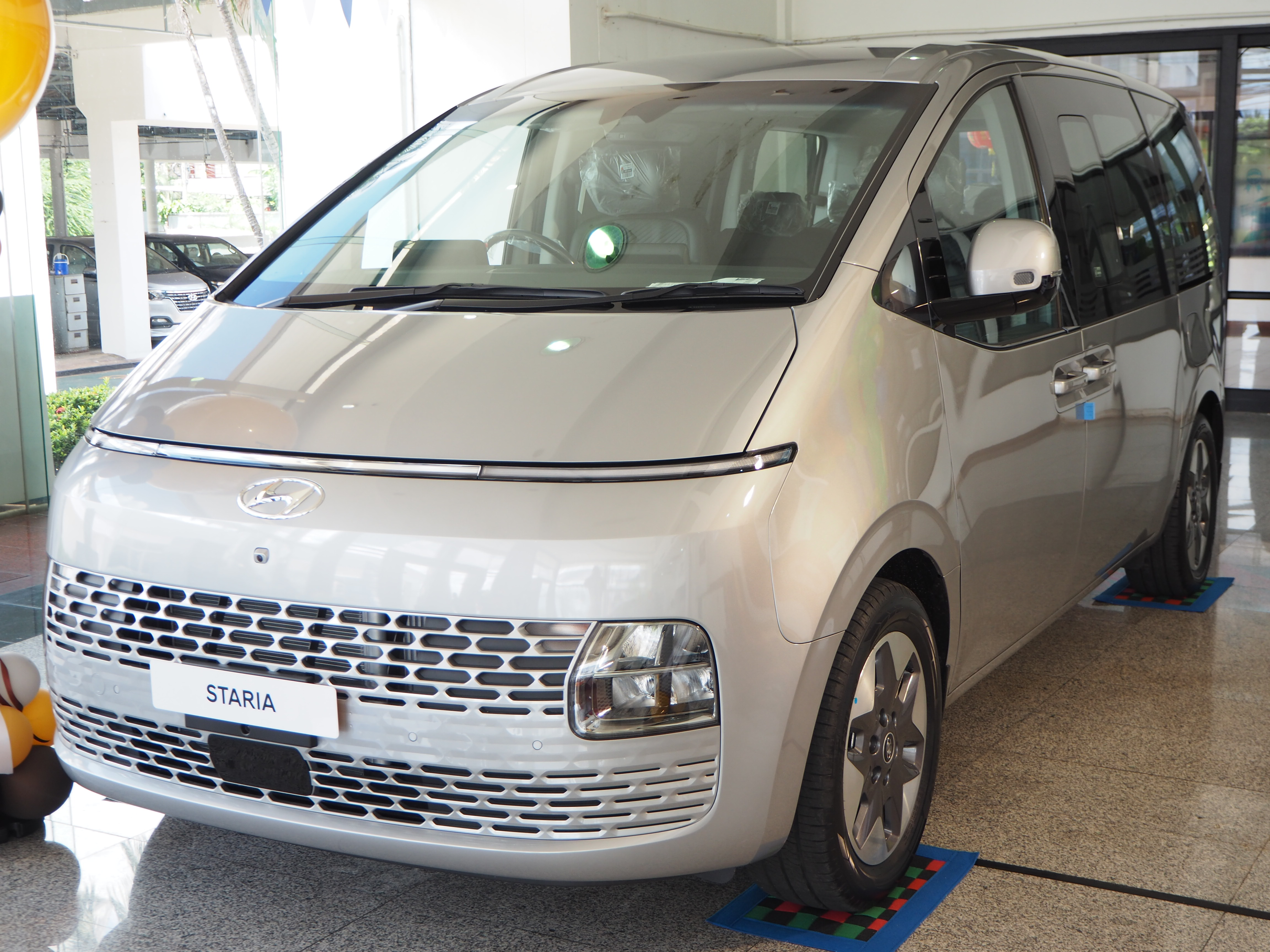
Hyundai Staria (US4)

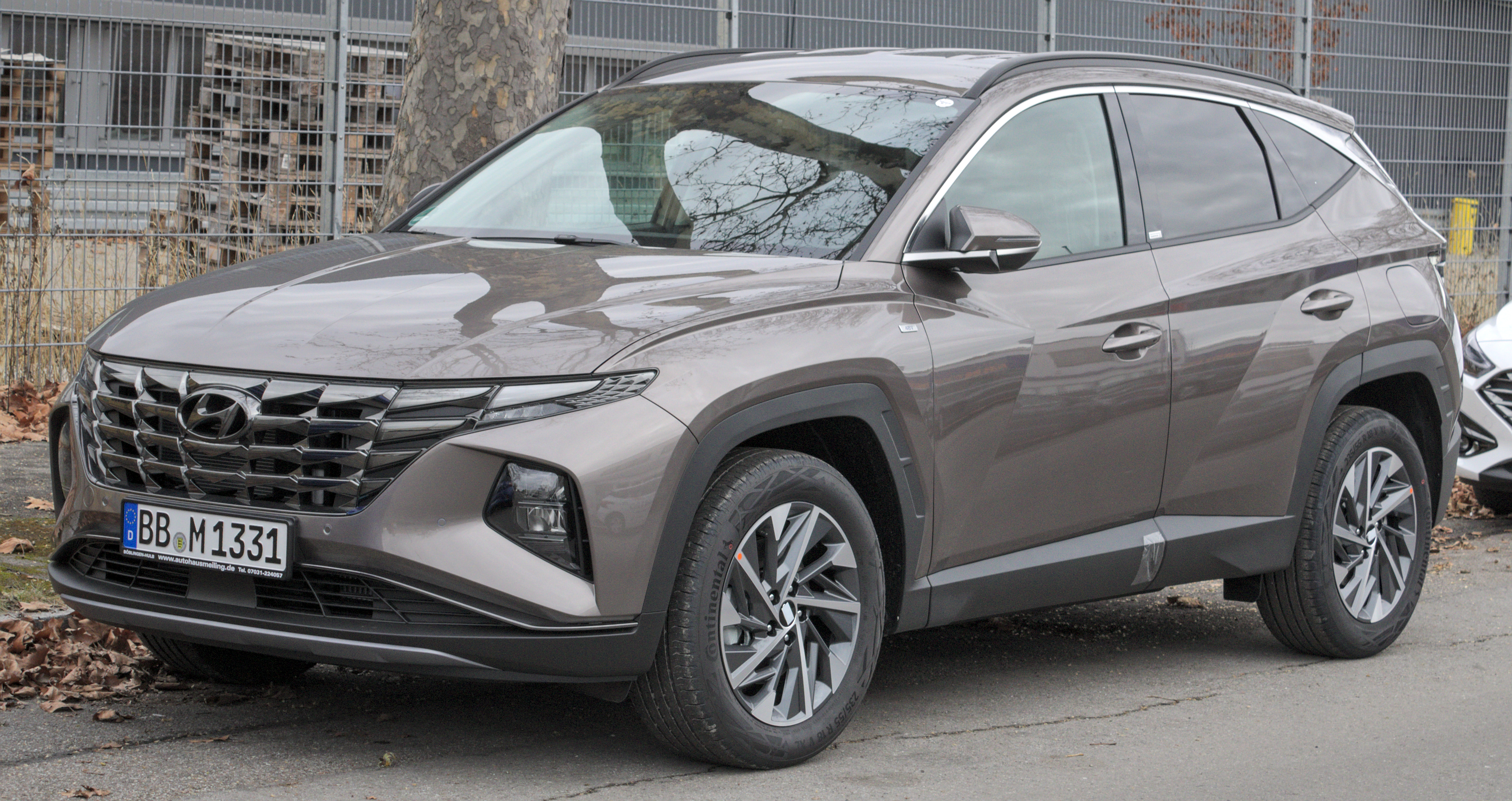
Hyundai Tucson (NX4)

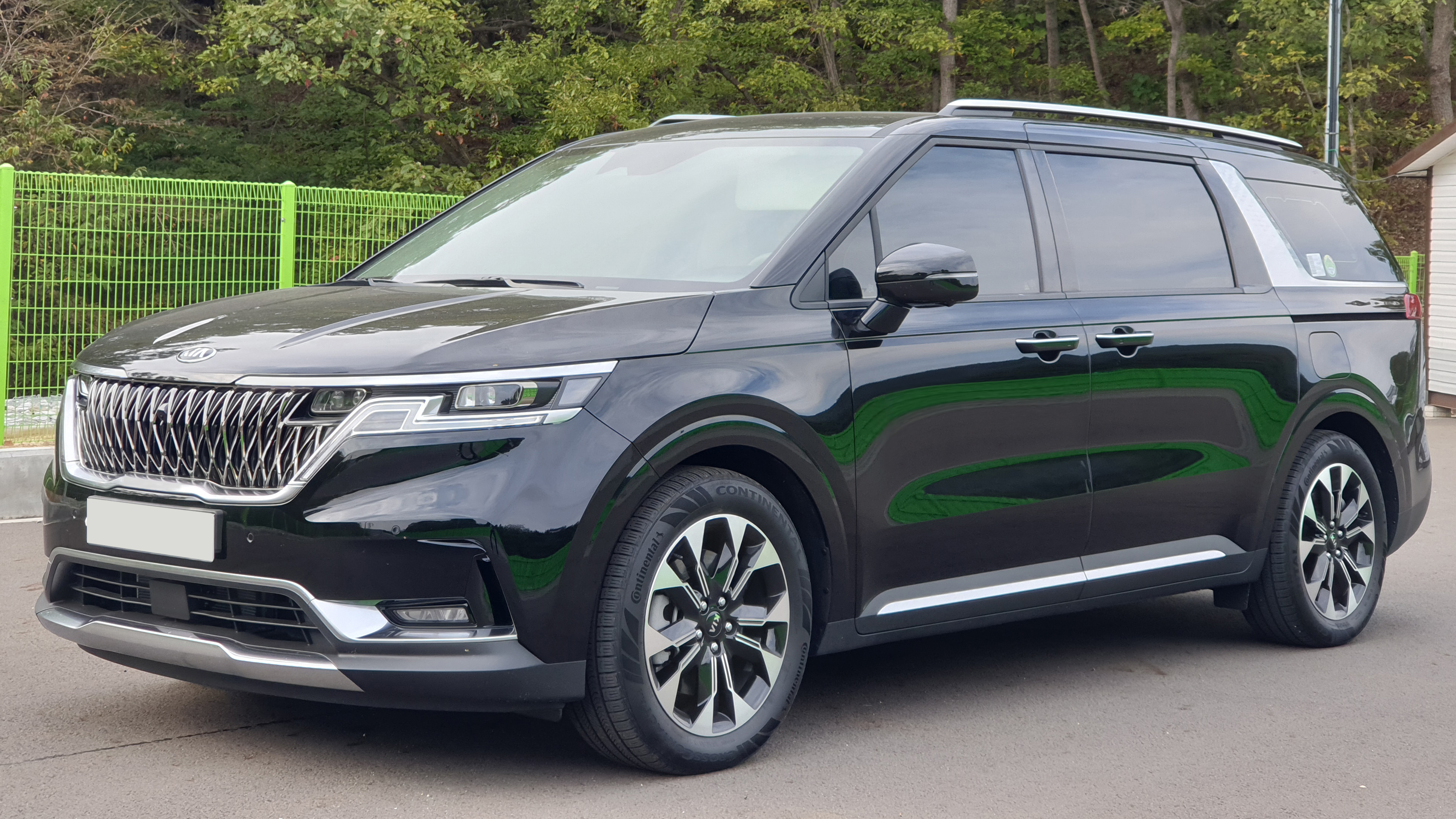
Kia Carnival (KA4)

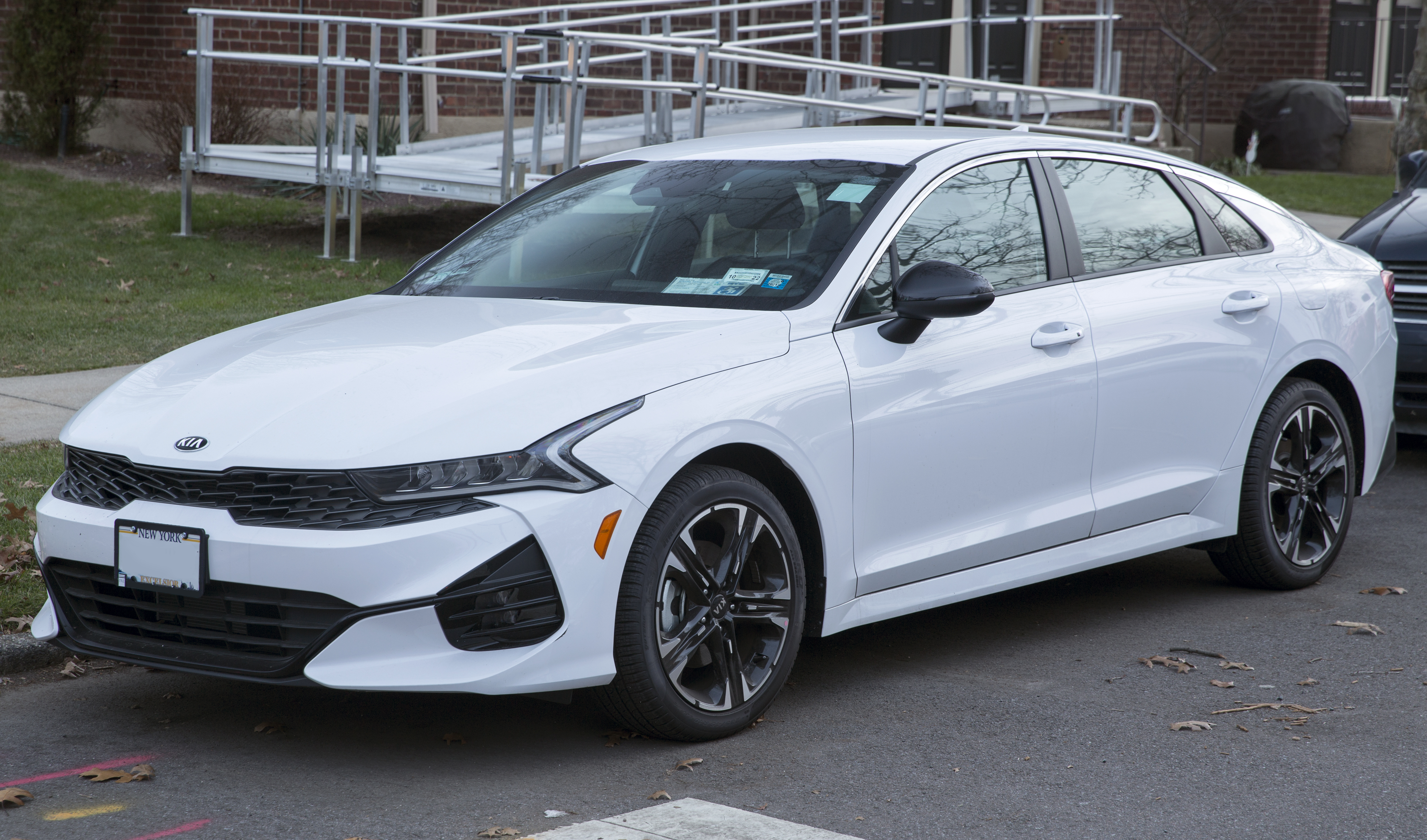
Kia K5 (DL3)

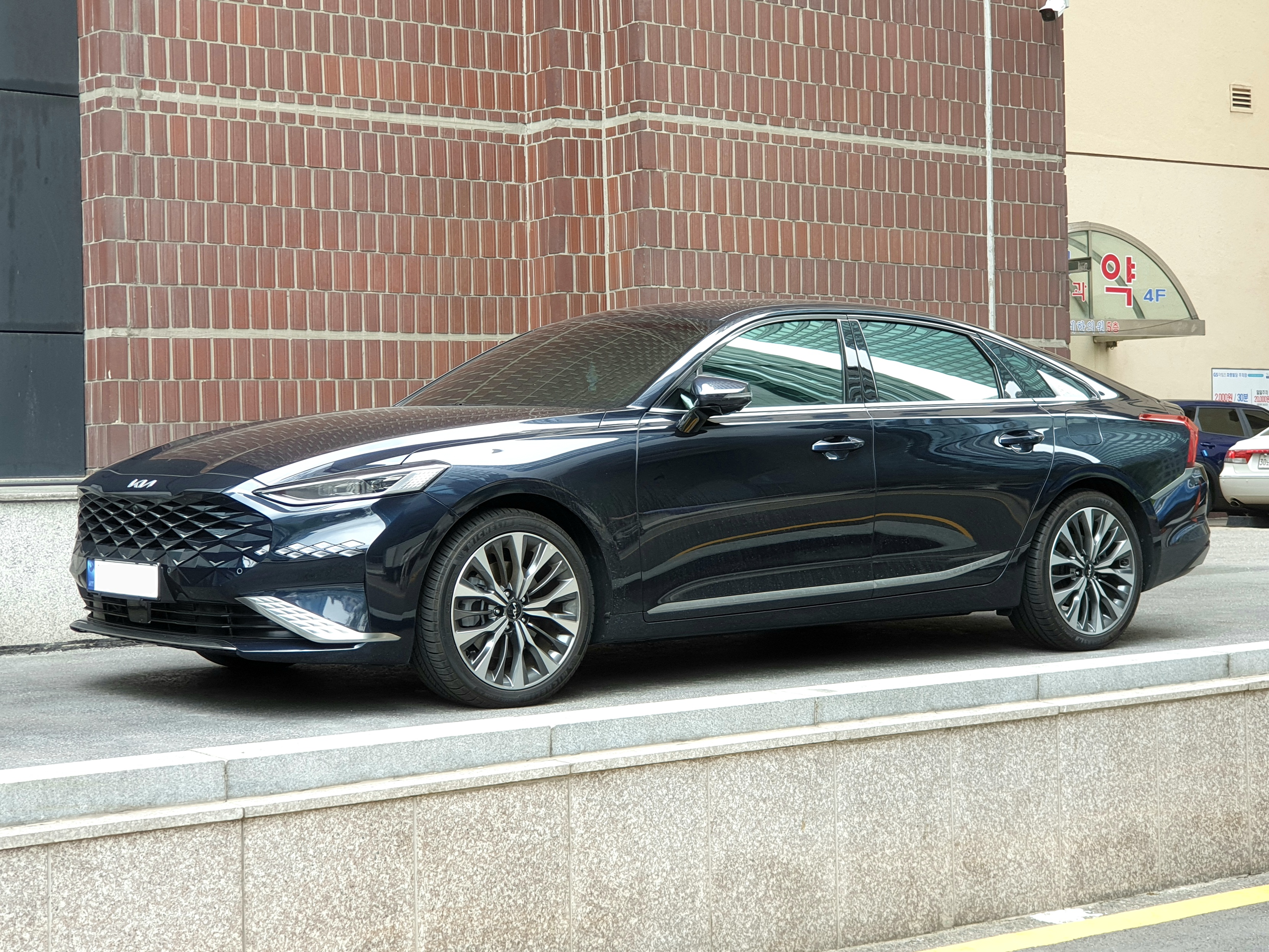
Kia K8 (GL3)

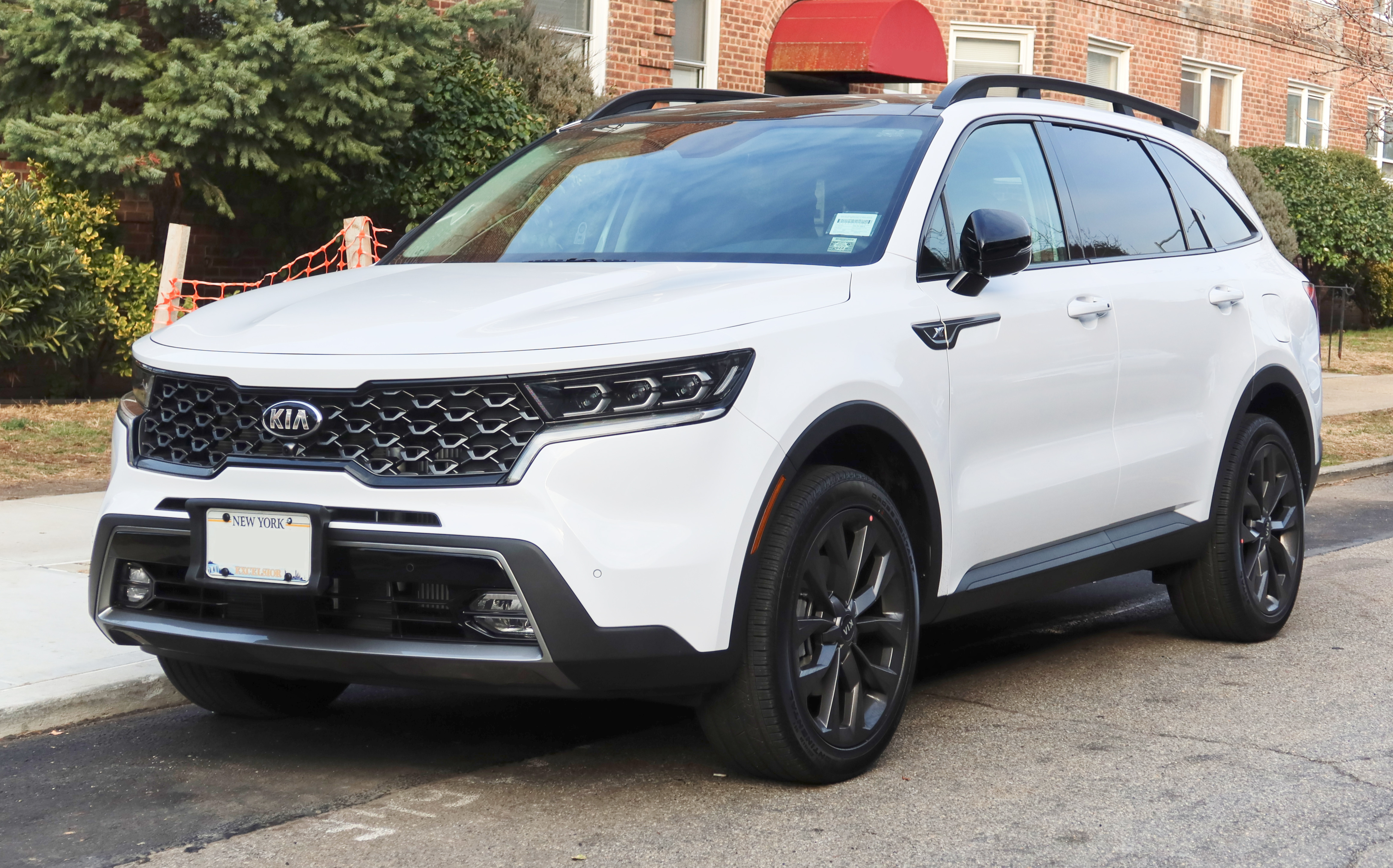
Kia Sorento (MQ4)

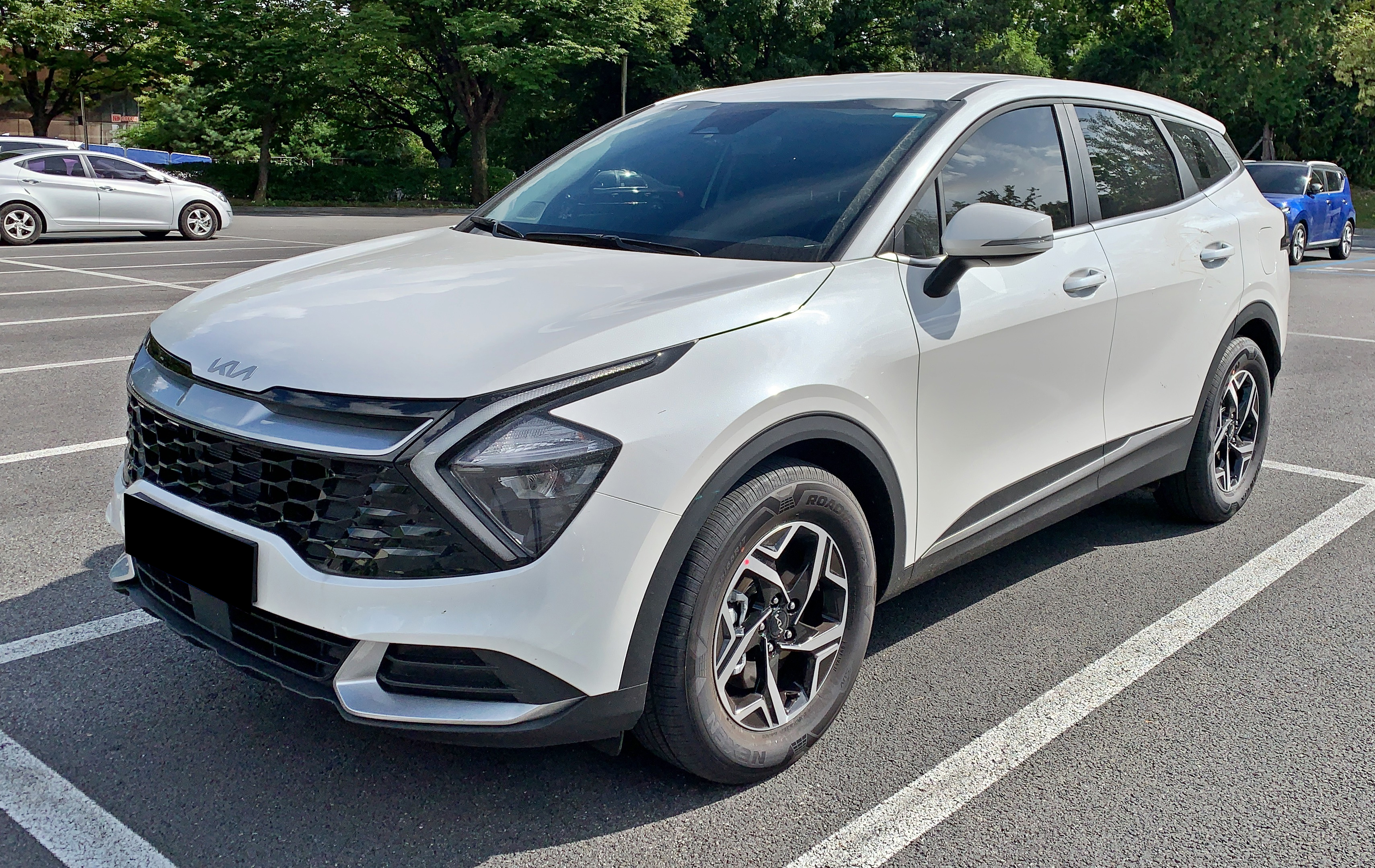
Kia Sportage (NQ5)

== N3 eK platform ==
The N3 eK platform is a battery electric vehicle platform introduced in 2023.

Vehicles using platform (calendar years):

- Kia EV5 (OV) (2023–present)
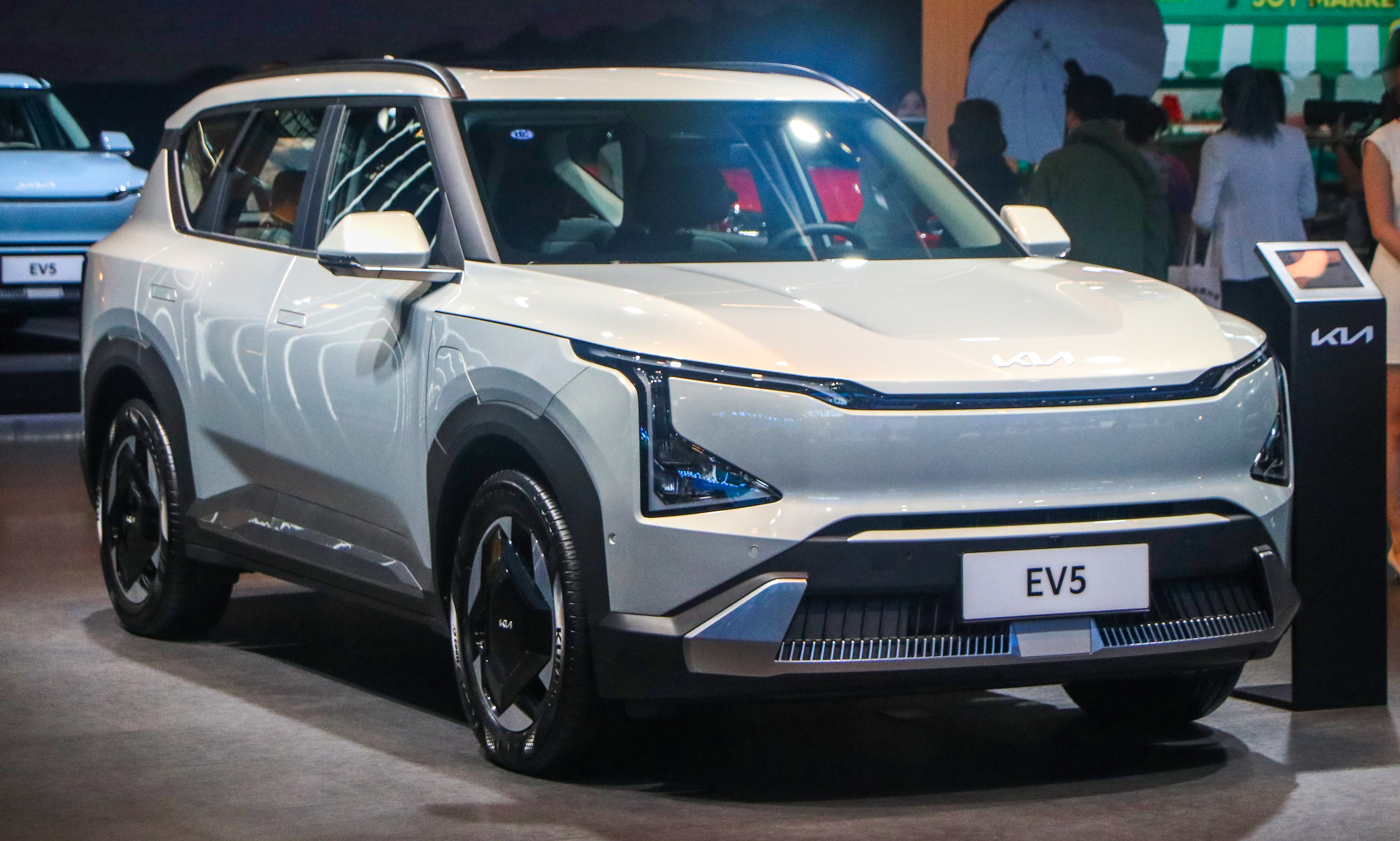
Kia EV5 (OV)
