= Hyundai Custo =

Minivan

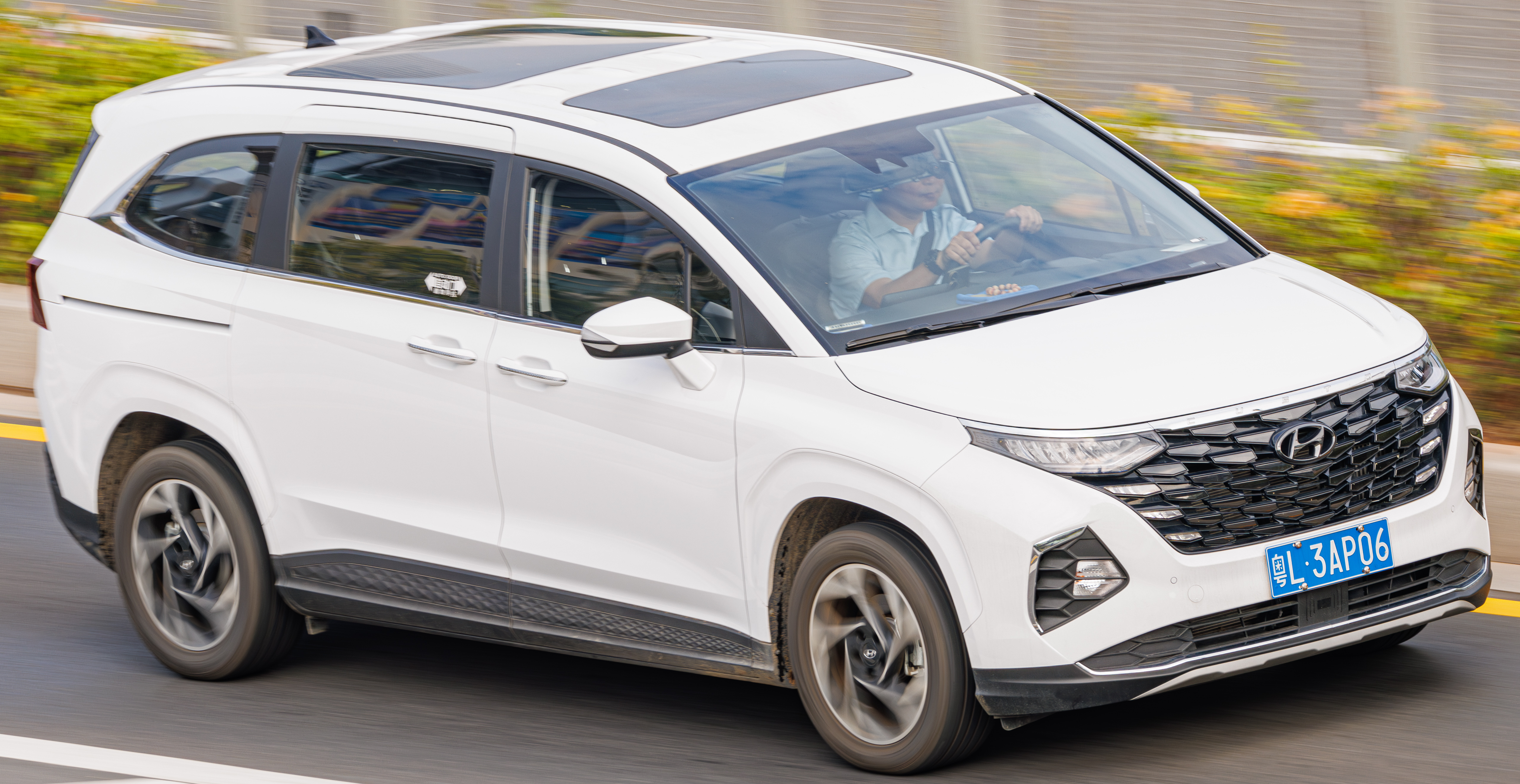

Overview
- Manufacturer: Hyundai
- Model code: KU
- Also called: Hyundai Custin
- Production: 2021–present
- Assembly: China: Beijing (Beijing Hyundai); Taiwan: Hukou (Sanyang Motor); Vietnam: Ninh Bình (HTMV)

Body and chassis
- Class: Minivan
- Body style: 5-door minivan
- Layout: Front-engine, front-wheel-drive
- Platform: Hyundai-Kia N3 platform
- Related: Kia Carnival (KA4)

Powertrain
- Engine: Petrol: 1.5 L Smartstream G1.5 T-GDi I4; 2.0 L Smartstream G2.0 T-GDi I4
- Transmission: 8-speed automatic

Dimensions
- Wheelbase: 3,055 mm (120.3 in)
- Length: 4,950 mm (194.9 in)
- Width: 1,850 mm (72.8 in)
- Height: 1,734 mm (68.3 in)
- Curb weight: 1,635–1,754 kg (3,605–3,867 lb)

The Hyundai Custo (Chinese: 现代库斯途; pinyin: Xiàndài Kùsītú) is a minivan or MPV manufactured by Hyundai through its Beijing Hyundai joint venture in China since 2021. It is named after the French explorer and inventor, Jacques Cousteau. In markets outside China, it is marketed as the Hyundai Custin.

== Overview ==
The Custo is a seven-seater vehicle with a 2+2+3 interior configuration with captain's chairs for the second row. It shares design features with the Hyundai Tucson. For the digital features, the Hyundai Custo adopts a floating center console and a 10.4-inch touchscreen arranged in a portrait mode and surrounded by a few touch-sensitive shortcut buttons.

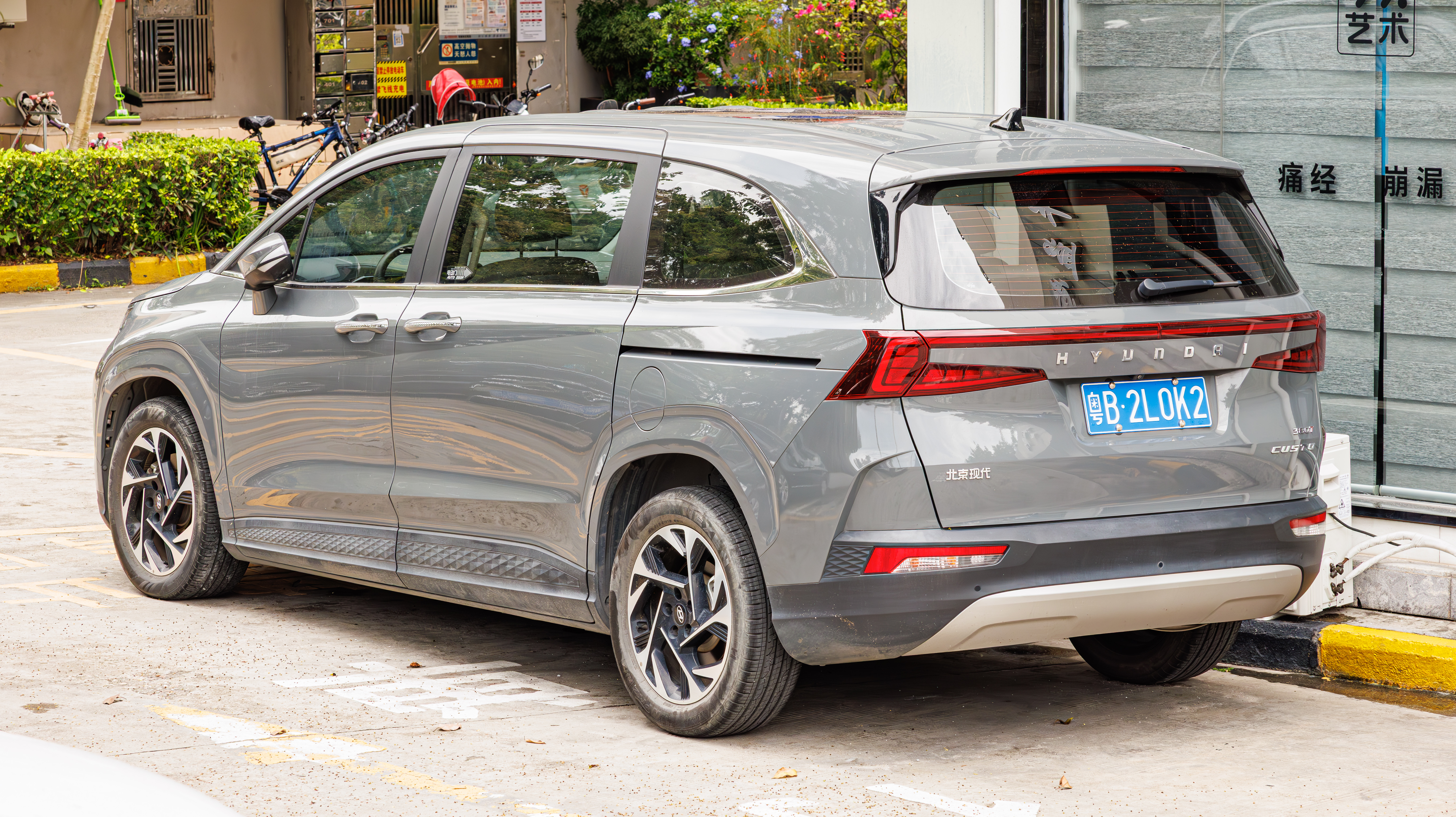
Rear view

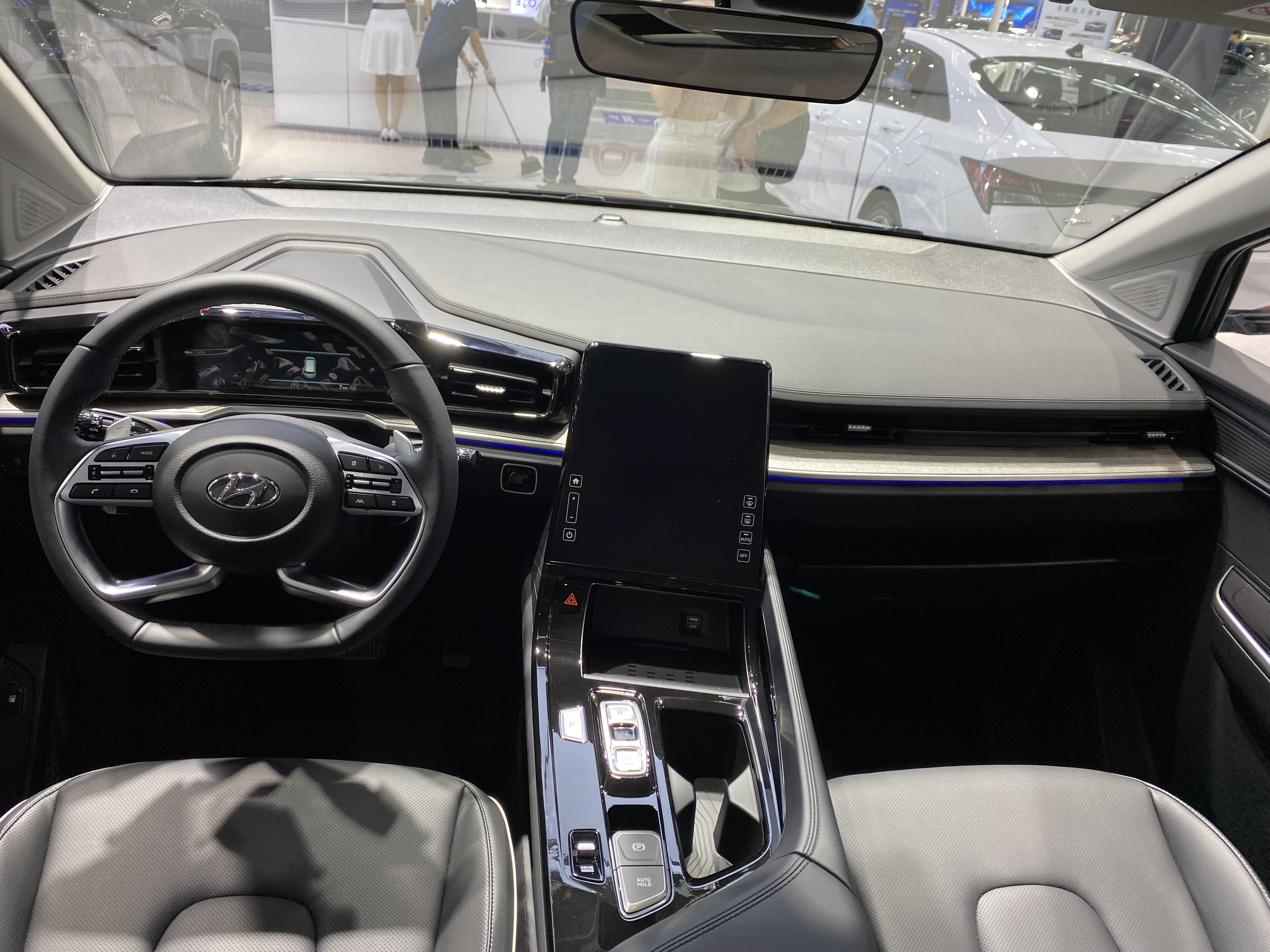
Interior

Facelift

Rear view (Facelift)

== Powertrain ==
The Custo is powered by a turbocharged 1.5-liter engine making 170 PS (125 kW; 168 hp) or a turbocharged 2.0-liter engine making 236 PS (174 kW; 233 hp). Both engines are paired with an eight-speed automatic.

== Markets ==
=== Philippines ===
The Custin was launched in the Philippines on 16 October 2023, alongside the Stargazer X. Imported from China, it is available in GLS and Premium grades.

=== Taiwan ===
The Custin was launched in Taiwan in September 2022. It is available in two variants: GLT-A and GLT-B. It is locally assembled at Sanyang Motor's facility in Hukou.

=== Vietnam ===
The Custin was launched in Vietnam on 15 September 2023. It is locally assembled at Hyundai's facility in Ninh Binh.

== Sales ==
Year	China
2023	12,791
2024	10,309
2025	17,044

== Safety ==
TNCAP (1.0) test result Hyundai Custin GLT-A (1.5T) (2025, similar to Euro NCAP 2017)
Test	Points	%
Overall:	4/5 stars	
Adult occupant:	28.348	74%
Child occupant:	36.882	75%
Pedestrian:	28.478	67%
Safety assist:	8.398	69%
