= Hyundai Lafesta =

Chinese sedan automobile

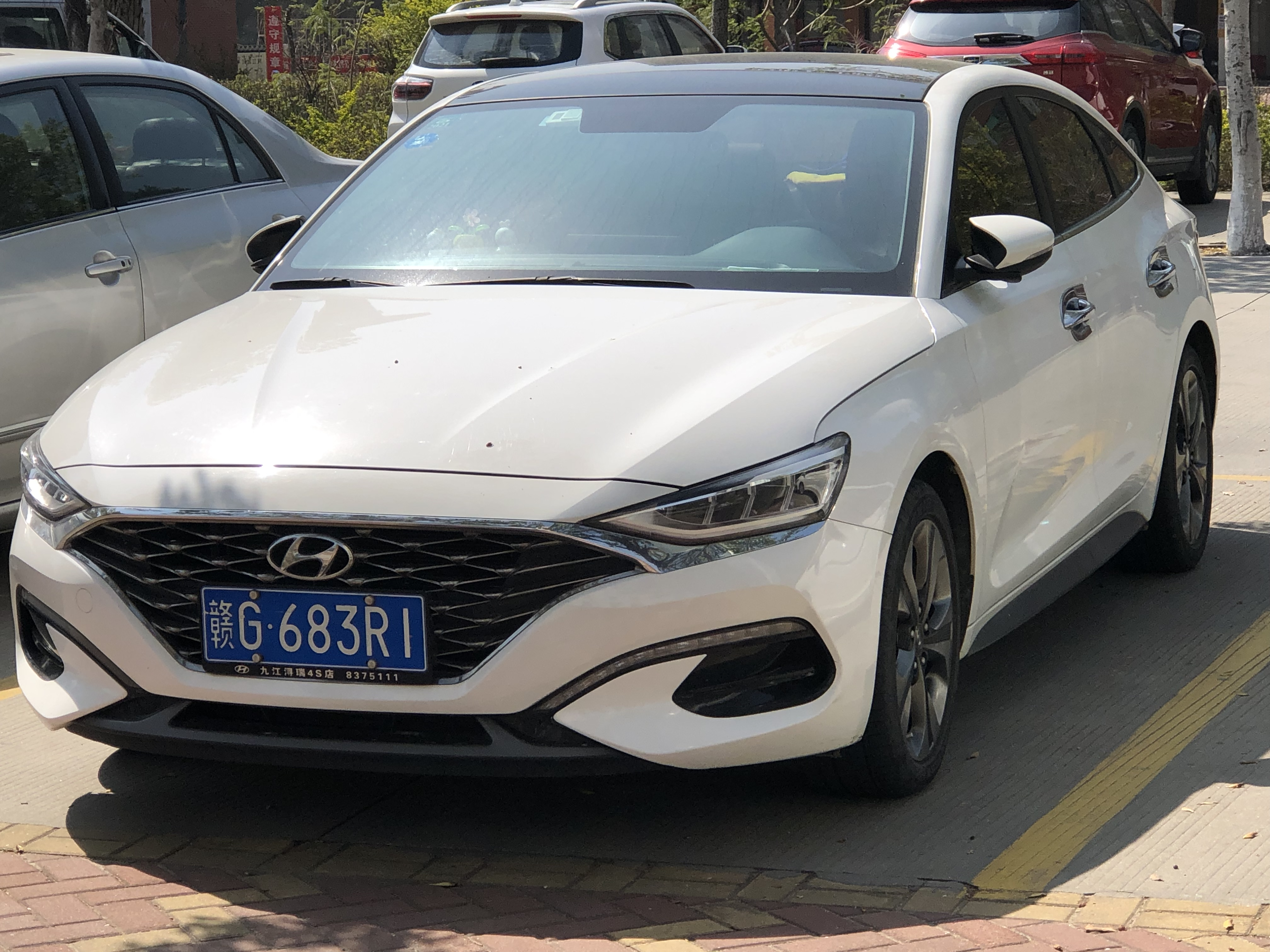

Overview
- Manufacturer: Hyundai
- Model code: SQ
- Production: 2018–2025
- Assembly: China: Beijing (Beijing Hyundai)

Body and chassis
- Class: Compact car (C)
- Body style: 4-door sedan
- Layout: Front-engine, front-wheel-drive

Powertrain
- Engine: Petrol: 1.4 L Kappa II T-GDI I4; 1.5 L Smartstream T-GDI I4; 1.6 L Gamma T-GDI I4
- Electric motor: Front-engine rear-battery Permanent Magnet Synchronous Motor (Hyundai Lafesta EV)
- Transmission: 7-speed DCT; 1-speed reduction gear (Lafesta EV)
- Battery: 56.5 kWh lithium-ion polymer battery (Lafesta EV)

Dimensions
- Wheelbase: 2,700 mm (106.3 in)
- Length: 4,660–4,690 mm (183.5–184.6 in); 4,705 mm (185.2 in) (EV)
- Width: 1,790 mm (70.5 in)
- Height: 1,425 mm (56.1 in); 1,435 mm (56.5 in) (EV)
- Curb weight: 1,420 kg (3,131 lb) (N-Line)

The Hyundai Lafesta (Chinese: 现代菲斯塔; pinyin: Xiàndài Fēisītǎ) is compact sedan manufactured by Hyundai through its Beijing Hyundai joint venture in China from 2018 to 2025. It sits between the Hyundai Elantra and Hyundai Sonata in Hyundai's Chinese vehicle lineup.

== Overview ==
The Hyundai Lafesta was first revealed at the 2018 Beijing Auto Show and was launched in the Chinese market in October 2018 with prices ranging from 119,800 to 145,800 yuan.

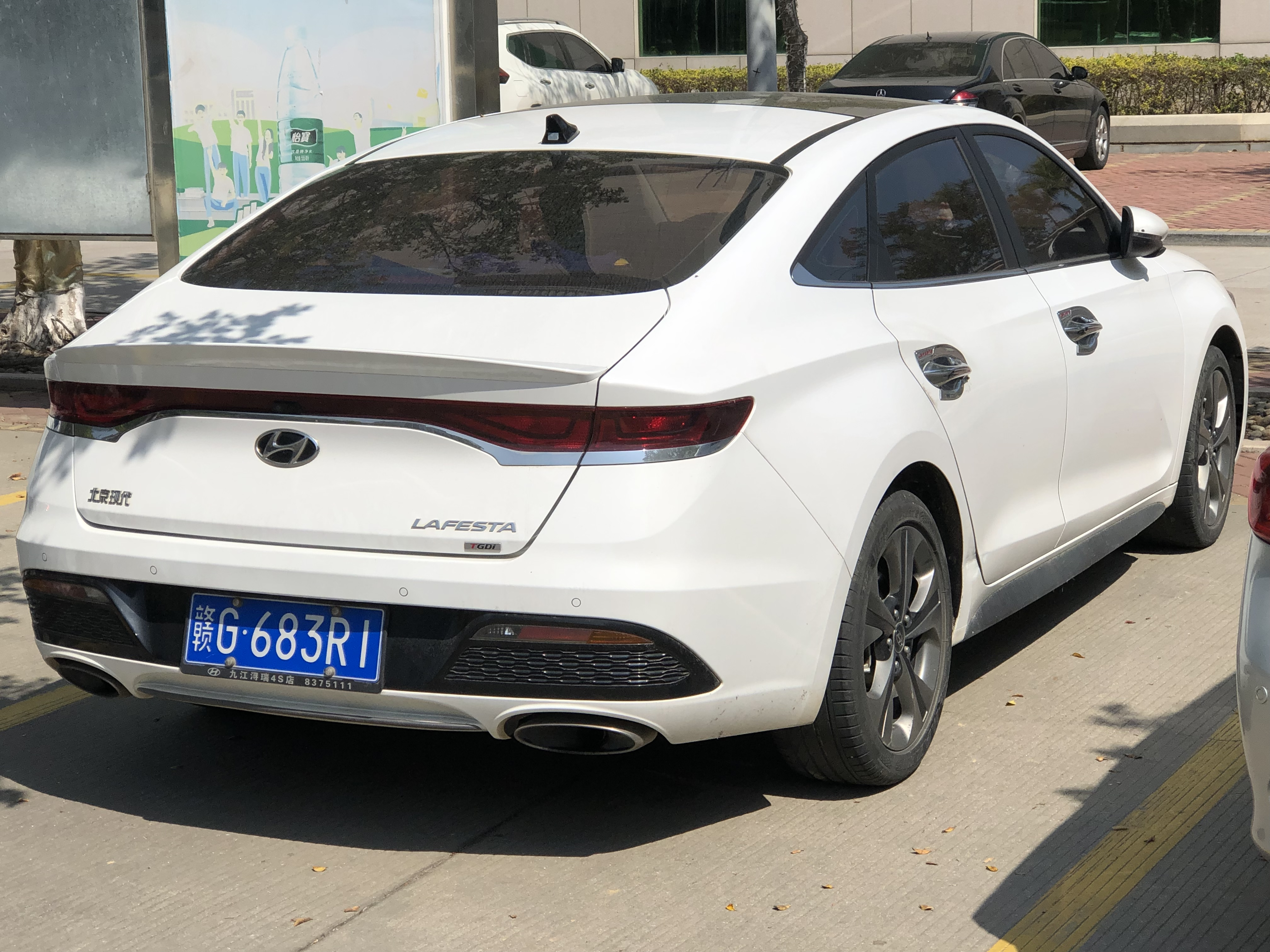
Rear view

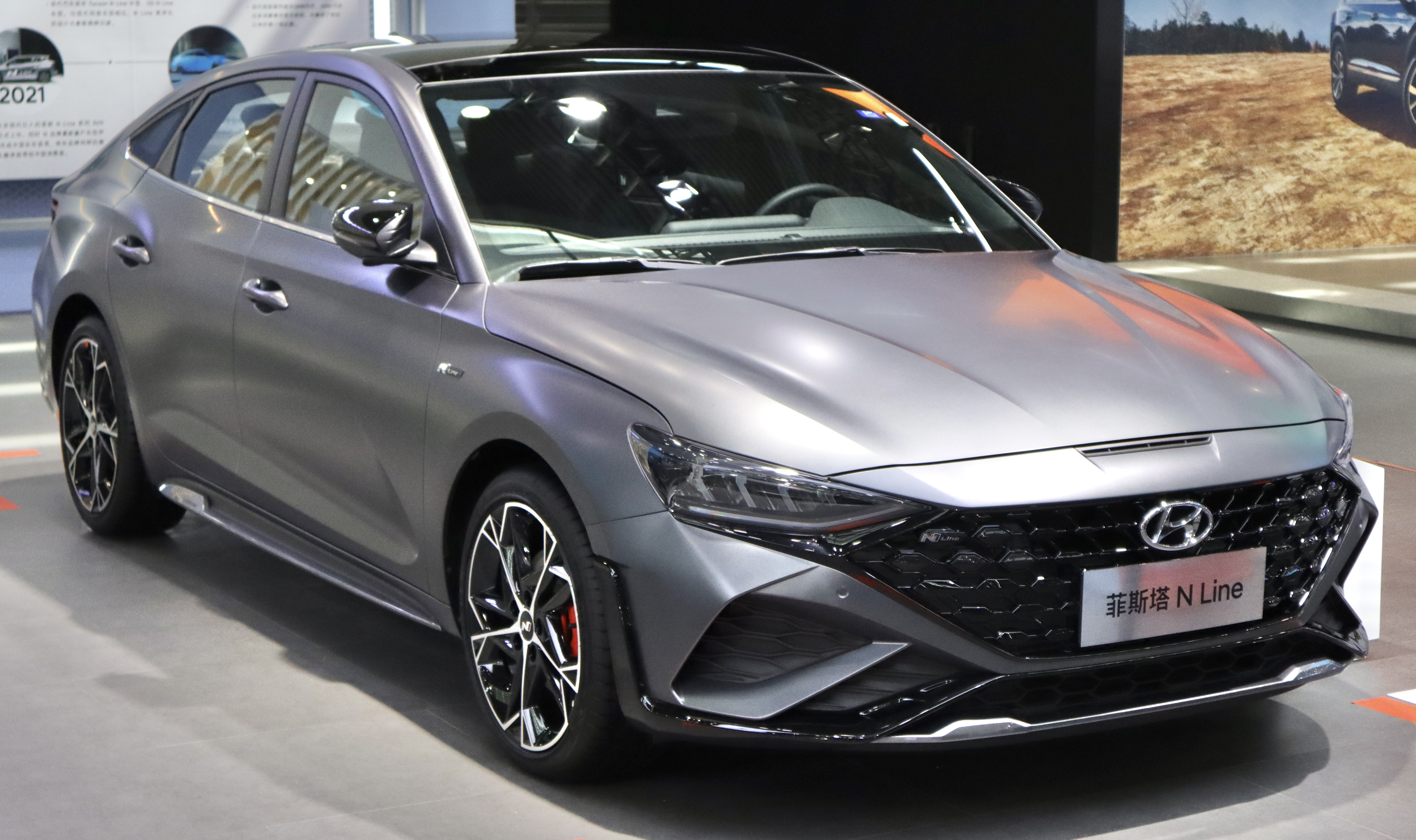
Hyundai Lafesta N-Line

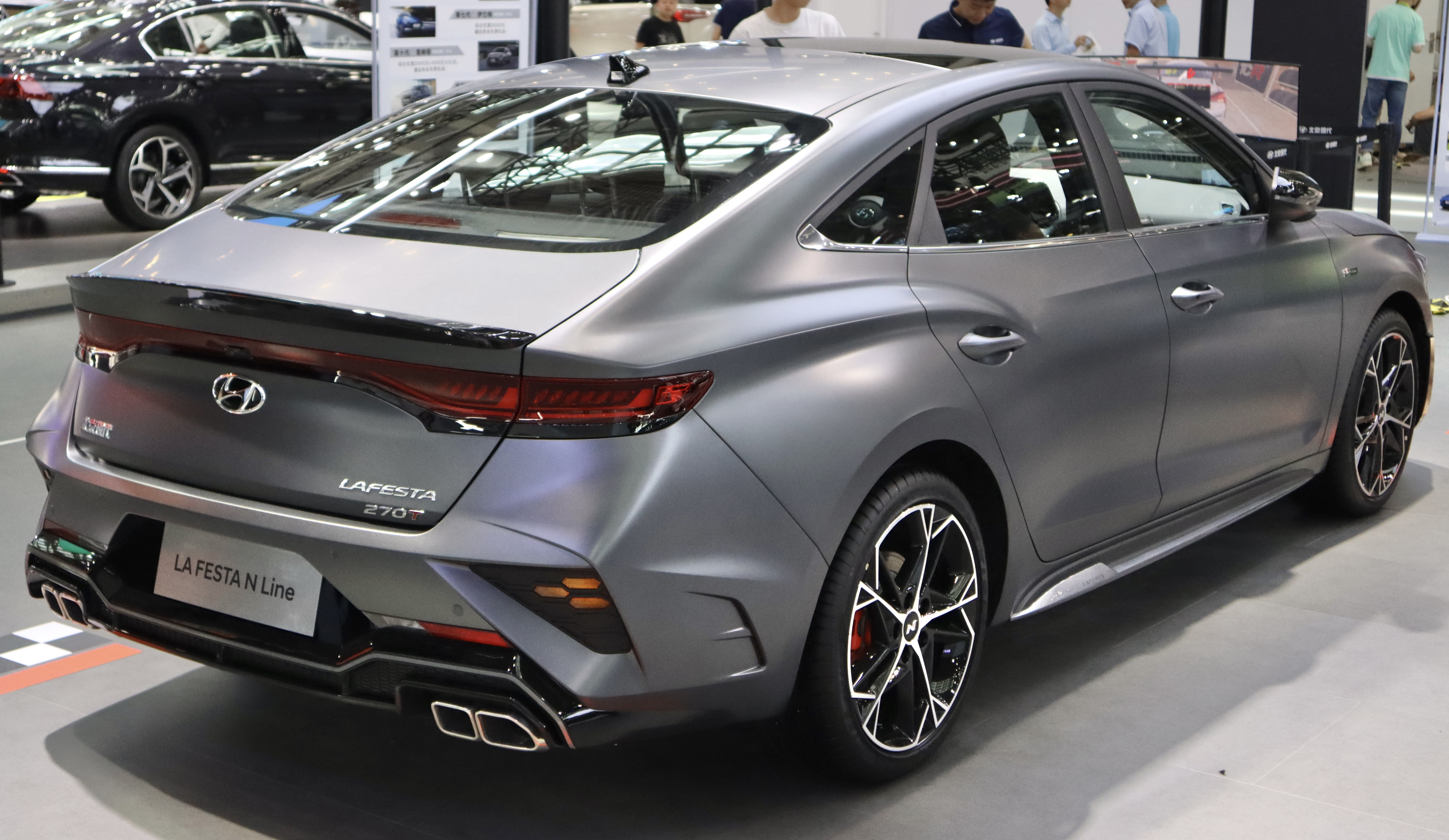
Rear view (N-Line)

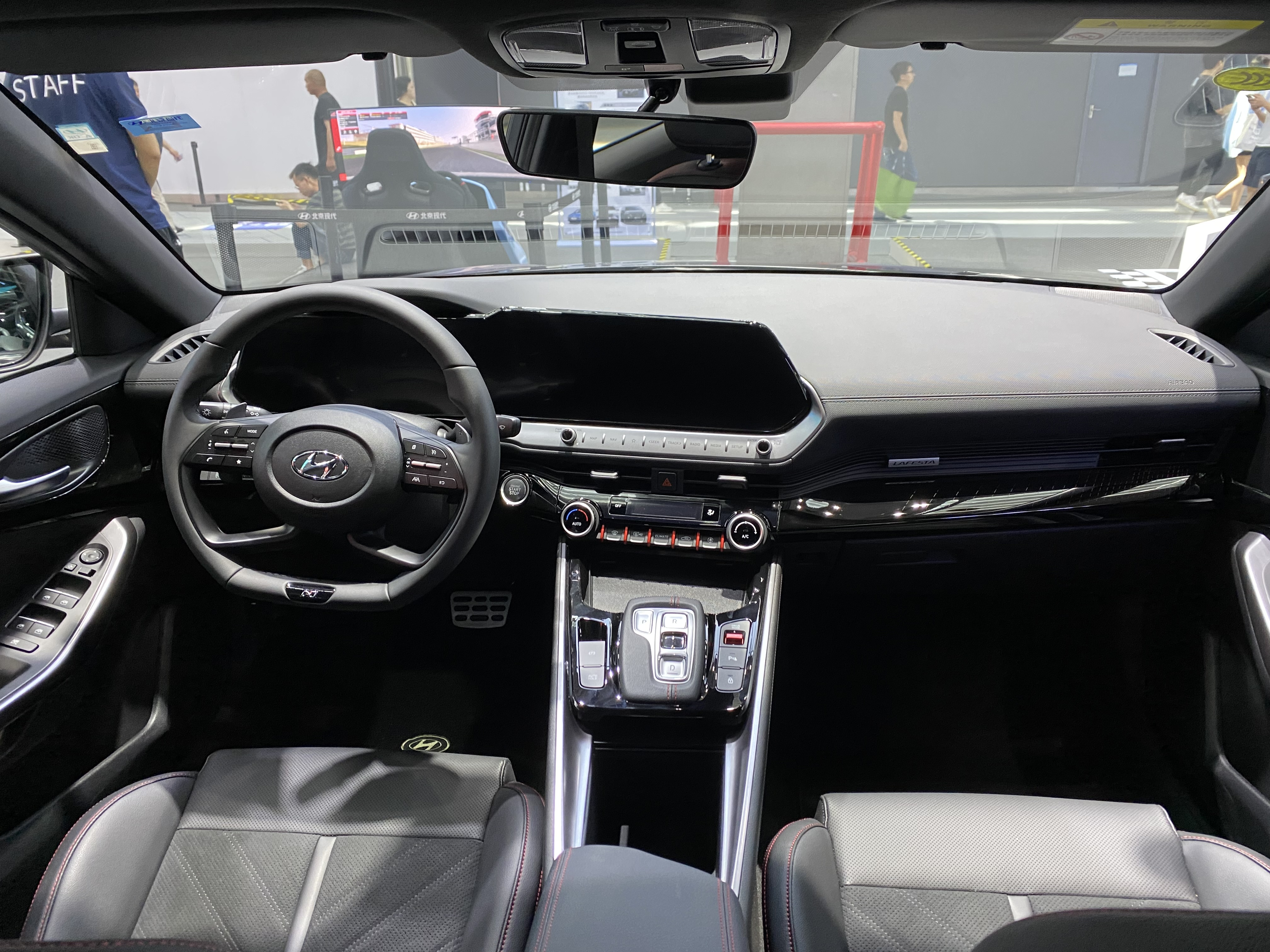
Interior (N-Line)

=== Lafesta Electric ===
A battery-electric version Lafesta Electric was announced to be available in China starting in December 2019. It is promised with 490 km (304 mi) NEDC range of 135 kW (181 hp; 184 PS) electric motor, 165 km/h (103 mph) top speed. It is slightly longer due to a new front with a more streamlined nose and slightly higher due to the necessary space for the battery. The battery cells are to be provided by CATL.

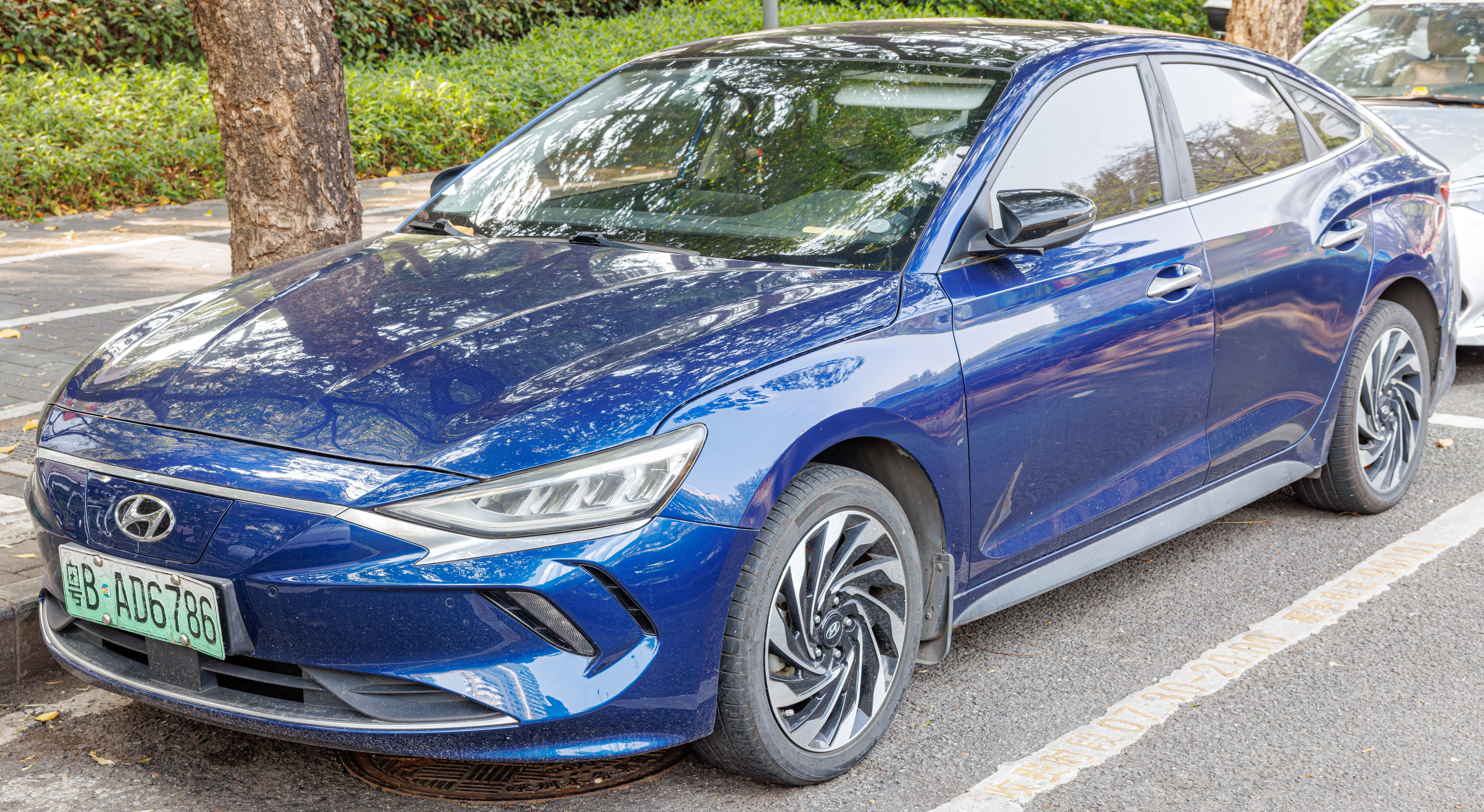
Hyundai Lafesta EV

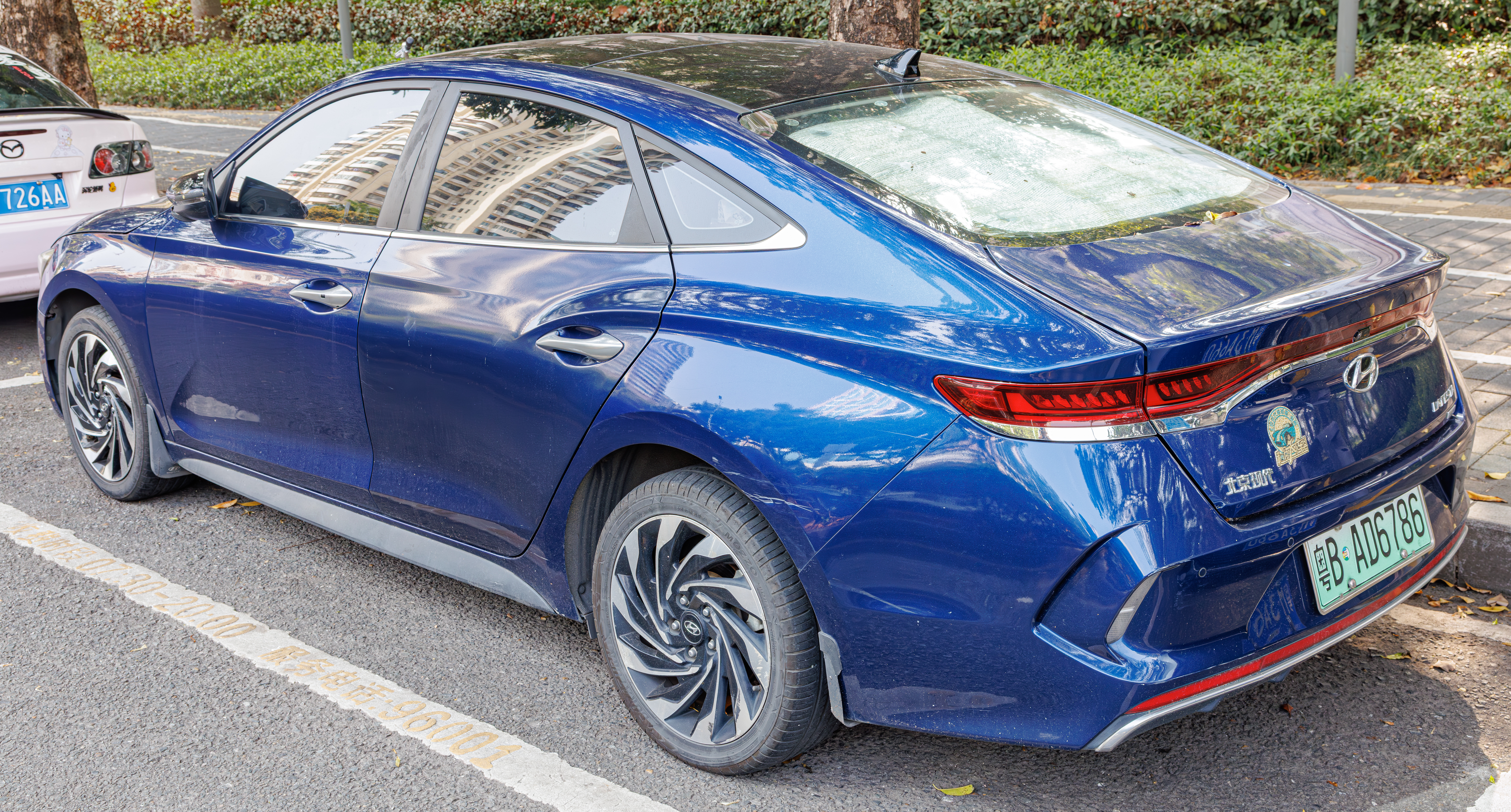
Rear view (EV)

=== Engines ===
The Lafesta is available with three engine options depending on the model year. A 1.4-litre turbo variant producing 103 kW (140 PS; 138 hp), 1.5-liter turbo producing 147 kW (200 PS; 197 hp) or a 1.6-litre turbo version producing either 140 kW (190 PS; 188 hp) or 150 kW (204 PS; 201 hp).

Specs
Model	Years	Type/code	Transmission	Power	Torque	Top speed
Petrol
1.4 L Kappa II T-GDi	2018–2020	1,353 cc (82.6 cu in) Turbo I4	7-speed DCT	140 PS (103 kW; 138 hp) @ 6,000 rpm	24.7 kg⋅m (242 N⋅m; 179 lbf⋅ft) @ 1,500–3,200 rpm	203 km/h (126 mph)
1.5 L Smartstream T-GDi	2022–2025	1,497 cc (91.4 cu in) Turbo I4	7-speed DCT	200 PS (147 kW; 197 hp) @ 6,000 rpm	25.8 kg⋅m (253 N⋅m; 187 lbf⋅ft) @ 2,200–4,000 rpm	220 km/h (137 mph)
1.6 L Gamma II T-GDi	2018–2022	1,591 cc (97.1 cu in) Turbo I4	7-speed DCT	190 PS (140 kW; 187 hp) @ 6,000 rpm	27 kg⋅m (265 N⋅m; 195 lbf⋅ft) @ 1,500–4,500 rpm	218 km/h (135 mph)
1.6 L Gamma II T-GDi	2018–2022	1,591 cc (97.1 cu in) Turbo I4	7-speed DCT	204 PS (150 kW; 201 hp) @ 6,000 rpm	27 kg⋅m (265 N⋅m; 195 lbf⋅ft) @ 1,500–4,500 rpm	220 km/h (137 mph)
Electric
Electric	2019–2022		1-speed direct drive	135 kW (184 PS; 181 hp) @ 14,000 rpm	310 N⋅m (229 lbf⋅ft)	165 km/h (103 mph)

== Sales ==
Year	China
2023	3,292
2024	569
2025	157
