= Hyundai Mufasa =

Compact crossover SUV

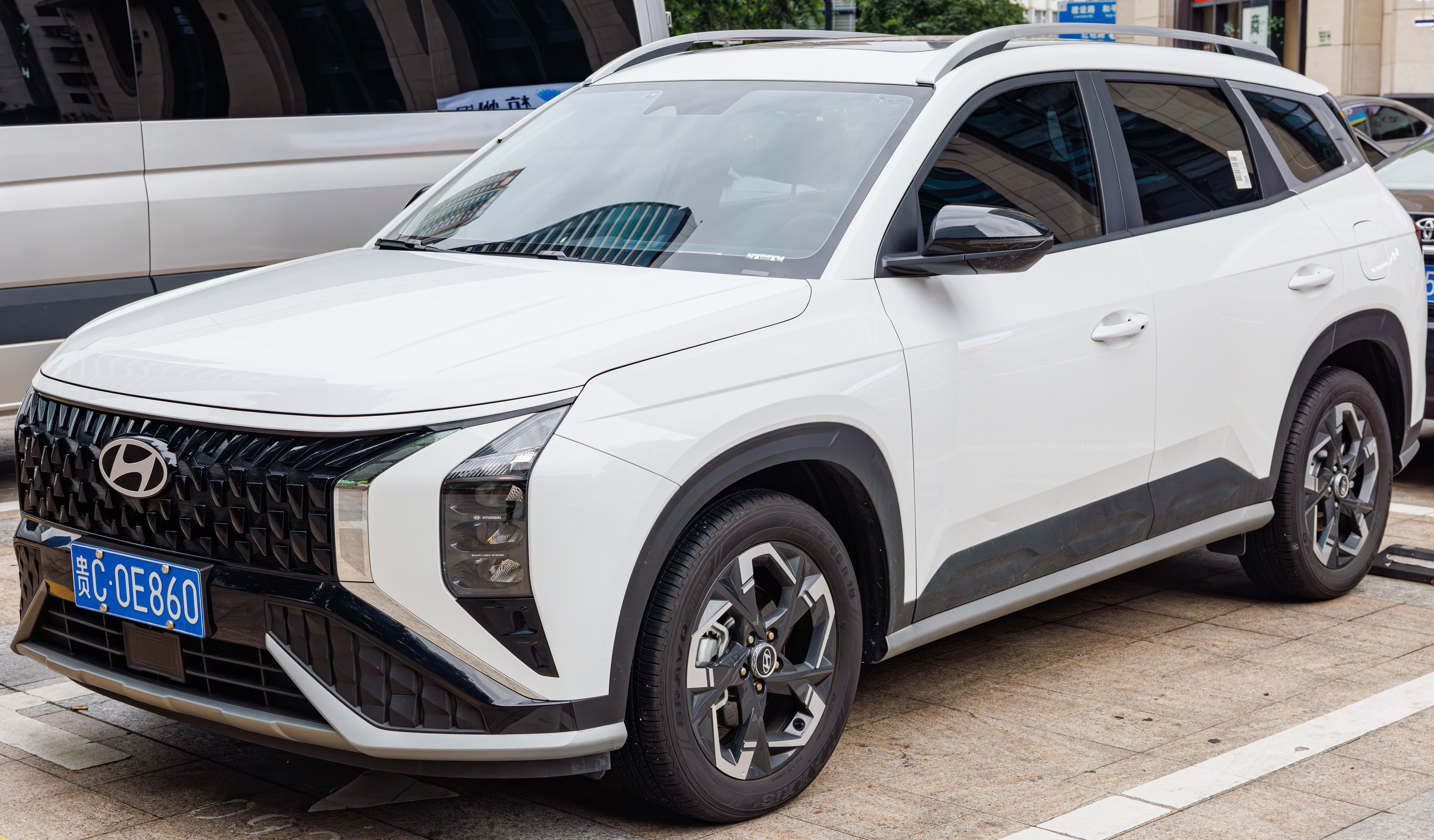

Overview
- Manufacturer: Hyundai
- Model code: NU2
- Production: 2023–present
- Assembly: China: Beijing (Beijing Hyundai); Taiwan: Hukou (Sanyang Motor)

Body and chassis
- Class: Compact SUV
- Body style: 5-door crossover SUV
- Layout: Front-engine, front-wheel-drive
- Platform: Hyundai-Kia N3
- Related: Hyundai Tucson (NX4)

Powertrain
- Engine: Petrol: 2.0 L Smartstream G2.0 MPi I4
- Transmission: 6-speed automatic

Dimensions
- Wheelbase: 2,680 mm (105.5 in)
- Length: 4,475 mm (176.2 in)
- Width: 1,850 mm (72.8 in)
- Height: 1,665–1,685 mm (65.6–66.3 in)
- Curb weight: 1,440–1,464 kg (3,175–3,228 lb)

Chronology
- Predecessor: Hyundai ix35 (NU) (China)

The Hyundai Mufasa (Chinese: 现代沐飒; pinyin: Xiàndài Mùsà) is a compact SUV produced by the South Korean manufacturer Hyundai through its Beijing Hyundai joint venture in China since 2023, and Taiwan since 2025.

== Overview ==
The Mufasa was previewed as a concept car called the Mufasa Adventure on 24 March 2023. The concept model is equipped with a range of off-road accessories and rugged design elements.

The production model debuted at the 2023 Shanghai Auto Show in April 2023 before going on sale on the Chinese market in June 2023, where it debuted alongside the Hyundai Elantra N.

The Mufasa features a 2.0 L (1,999 cc) engine that produces a power and torque of 118 kW (160 PS) at 6,500 rpm and 193 N⋅m (142 lb⋅ft) at 4,500 rpm, respectively.

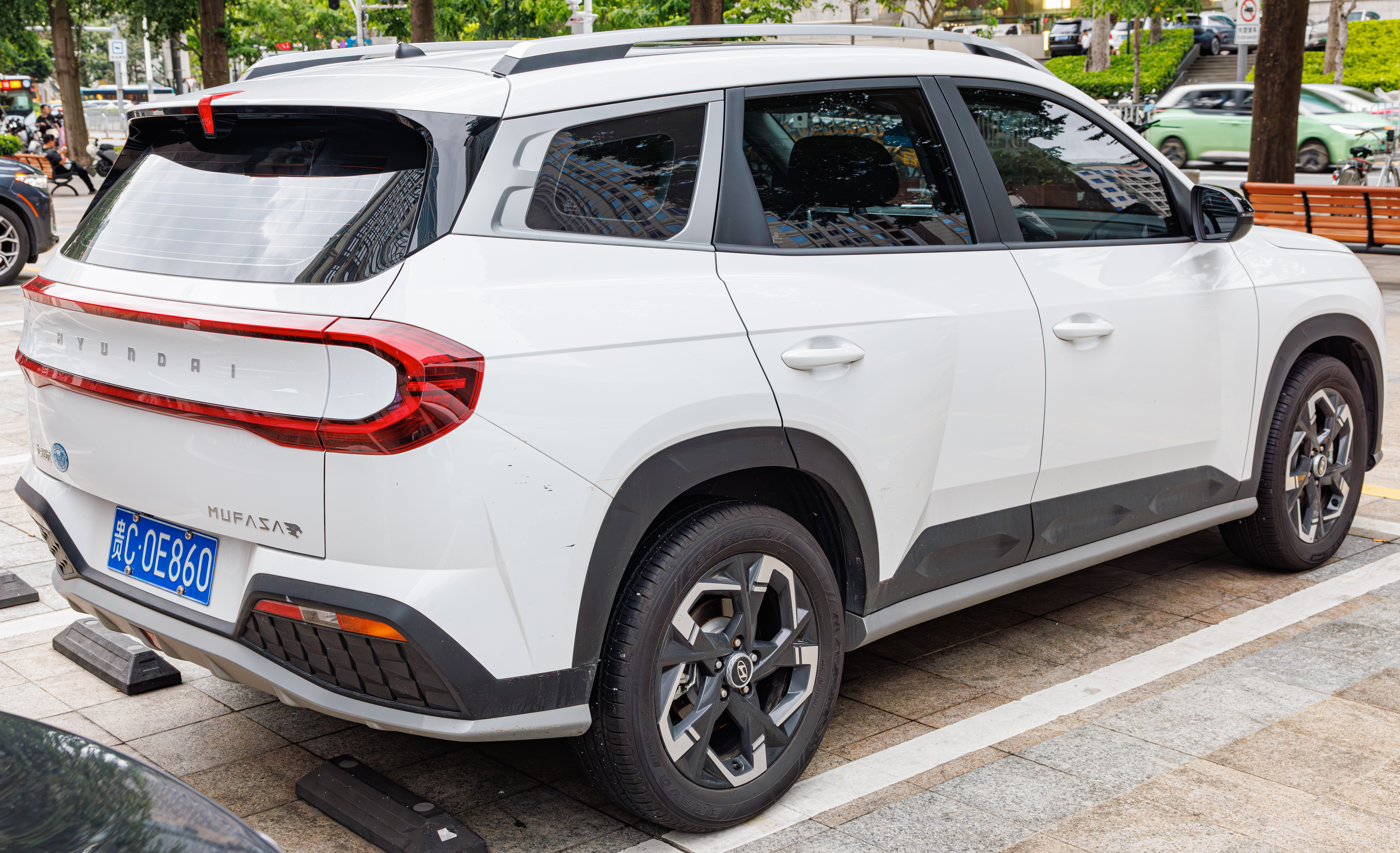
Rear view

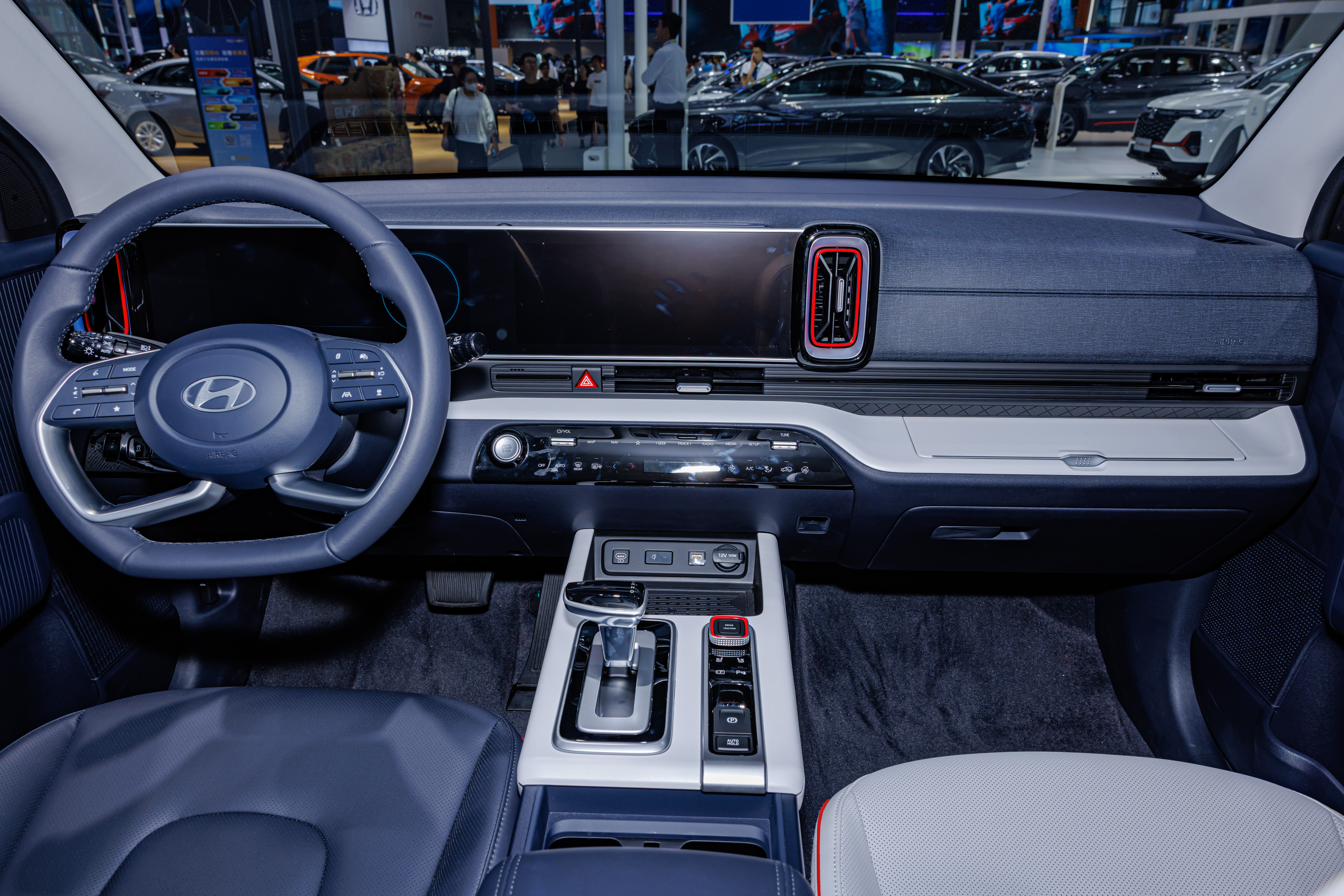
Interior

== Markets ==
=== Taiwan ===
The Mufasa was introduced by Hyundai's distributor in Taiwan, Sanyang Motor, on 19 March 2025. It went on sale on 14 May 2025, and it is assembled locally. Three trim levels are offered, which are GLA, GLB, and GLC.

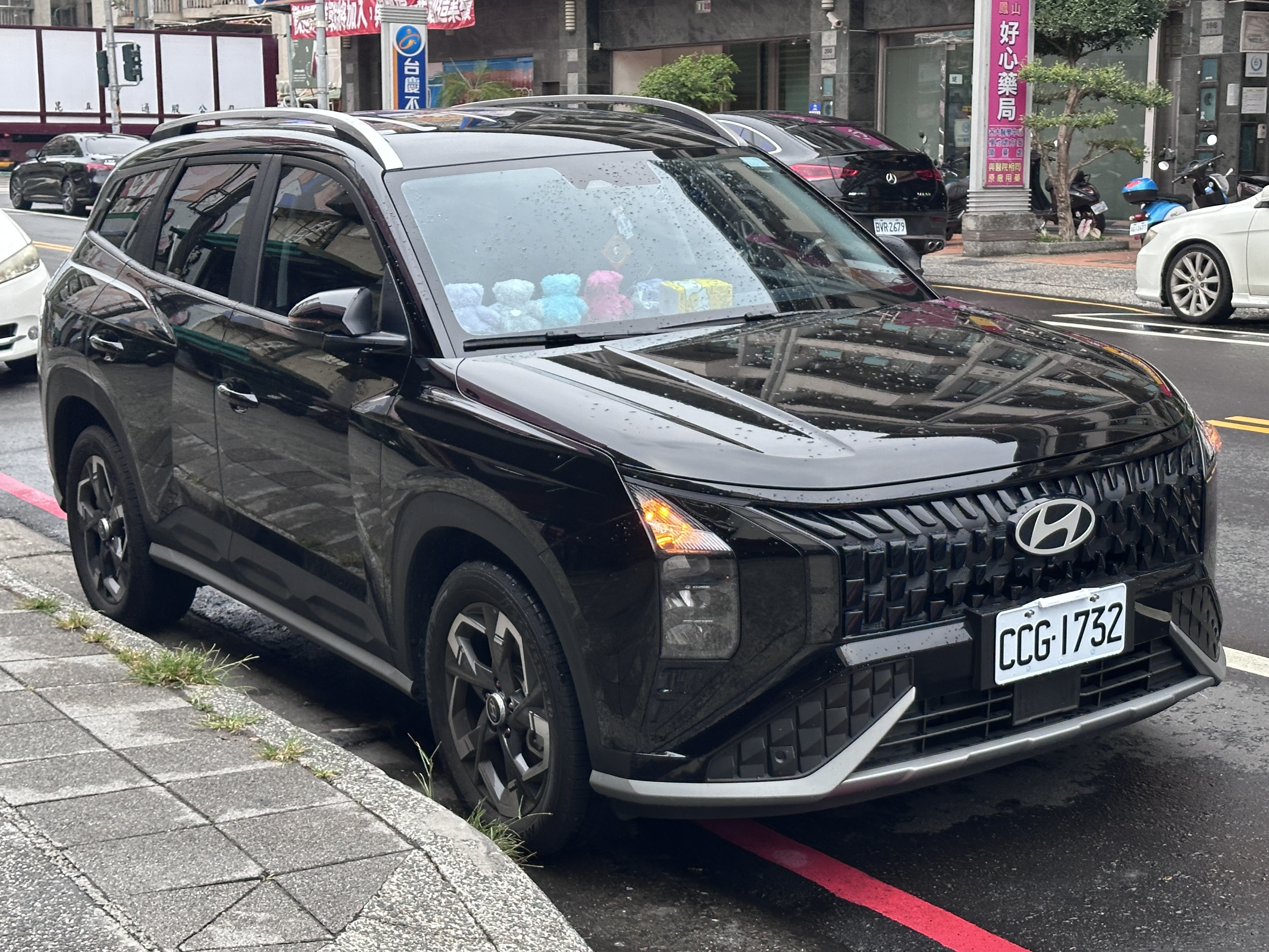
Hyundai Mufasa produced in Taiwan

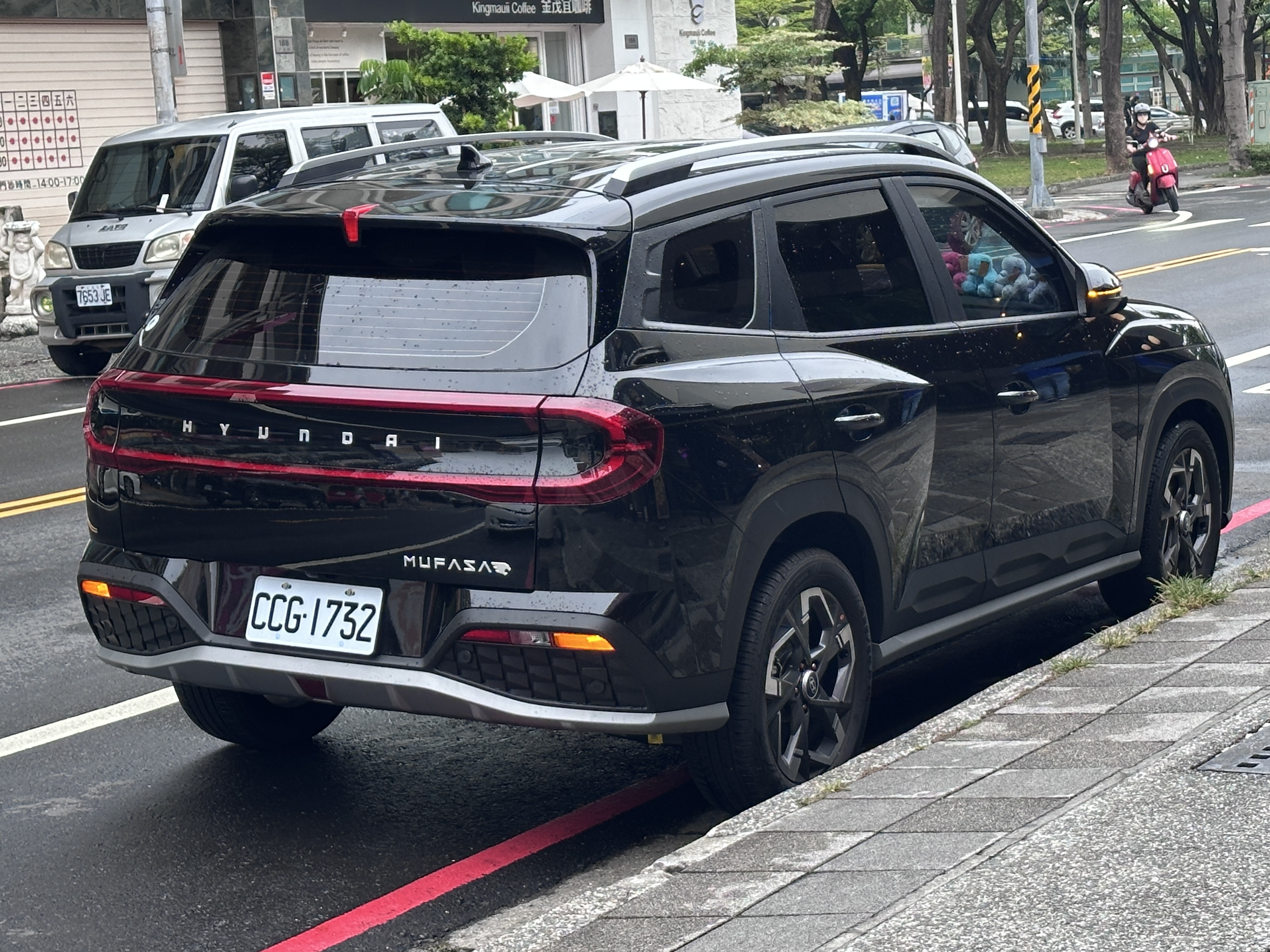
Rear view

== See also ==
- List of Hyundai vehicles
