= Kia Sportage (China) =

- 2021 Kia Sportage Ace

Overview
- Manufacturer: Kia
- Production: 2005–present
- Assembly: China: Yancheng (Yueda Kia)

Body and chassis
- Class: Compact crossover SUV
- Body style: 5-door SUV
- Layout: Front-engine, front-wheel-drive

The Kia Sportage for the Chinese market is a compact crossover SUV produced by Yueda Kia under the Kia brand. The first two generations of the Kia Sportage in China are the same as the international version, while the international third generation was sold in China as the Kia Sportage R and the international fourth generation as the Kia KX5. The China-exclusive third generation Kia Sportage was developed as a separate model based on the second generation Hyundai Tucson (sold as the ix35 in China).

== First generation (JE; 2005) ==
The first generation Chinese market Kia Sportage (Chinese: 起亚狮跑; pinyin: Qǐyà Shīpǎo) was the same as the international version (JE/KM) sold from 2005–2010. Production was extended after the discontinuation of the international model, with an extra facelift in 2013 exclusive to China, extending production and sales to 2015.

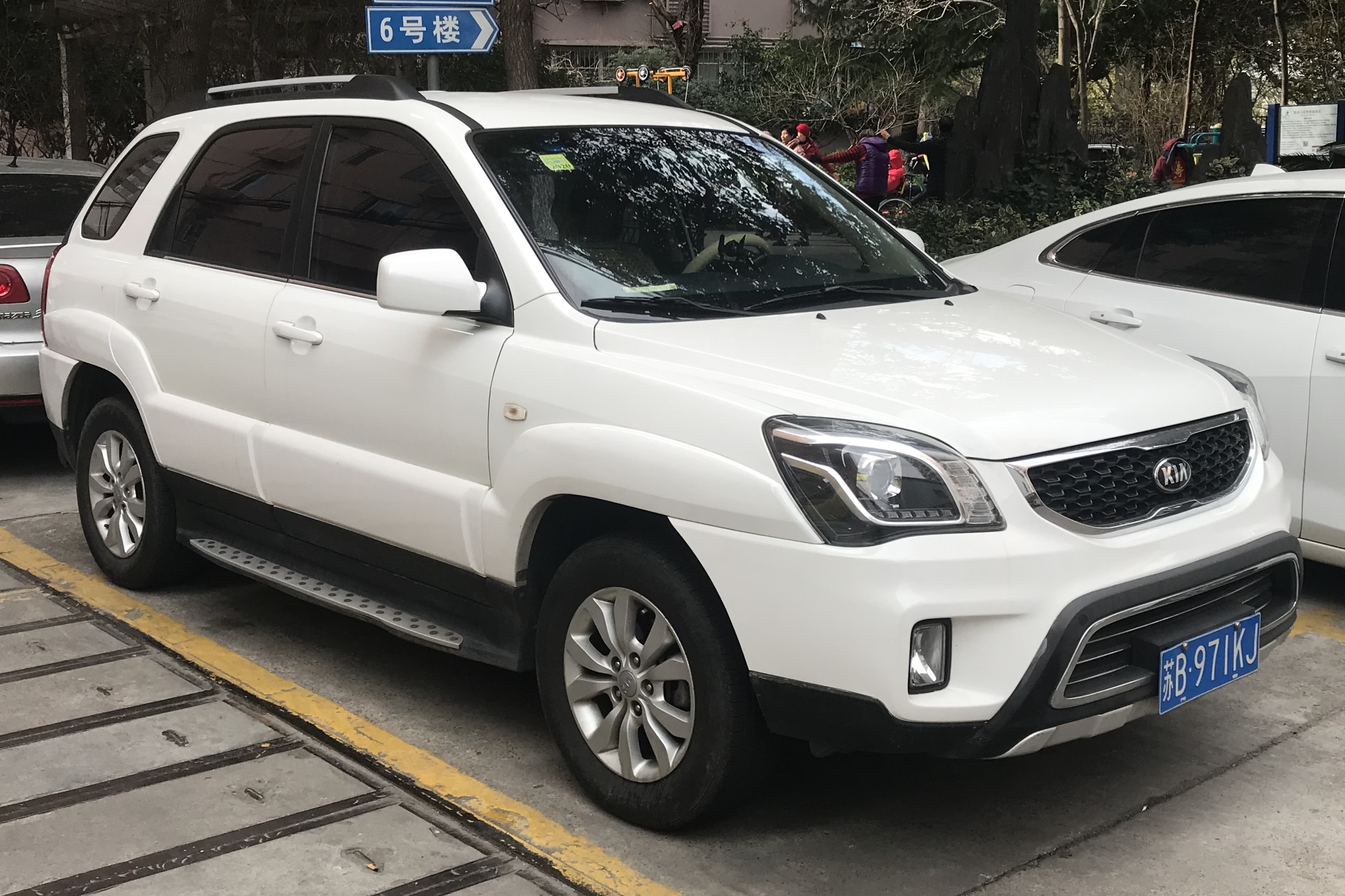
Kia Sportage (KM) Chinese facelift (front)

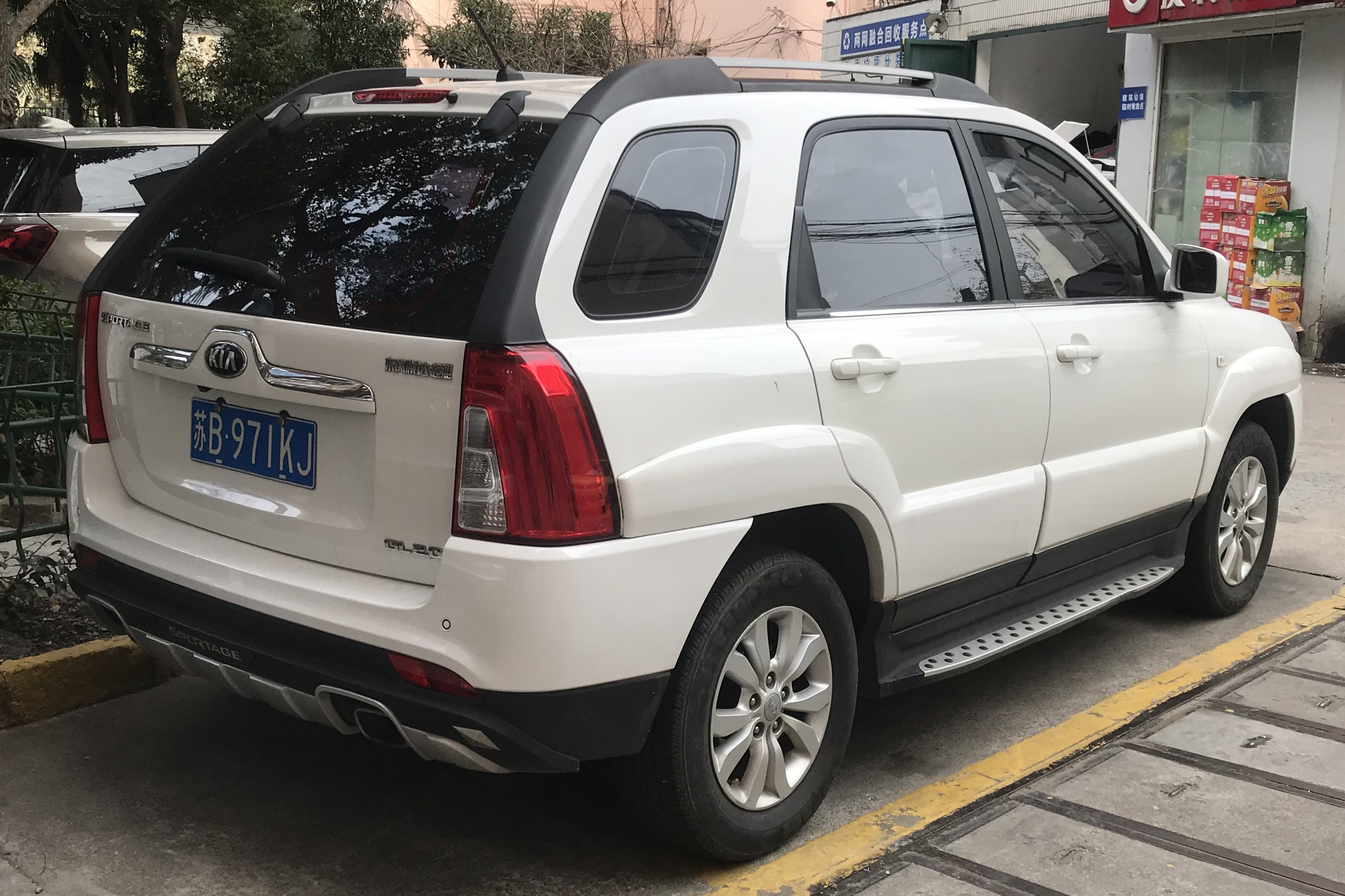
Kia Sportage (KM) Chinese facelift (rear)

== Second generation (SL; 2010) ==
The second generation Kia Sportage in China was sold as the Kia Sportage R (Chinese: 起亚智跑; pinyin: Qǐyà Zhìpǎo). The Kia Sportage R received a facelift in 2013, and was sold alongside its successor, the Kia KX5 for a brief period.

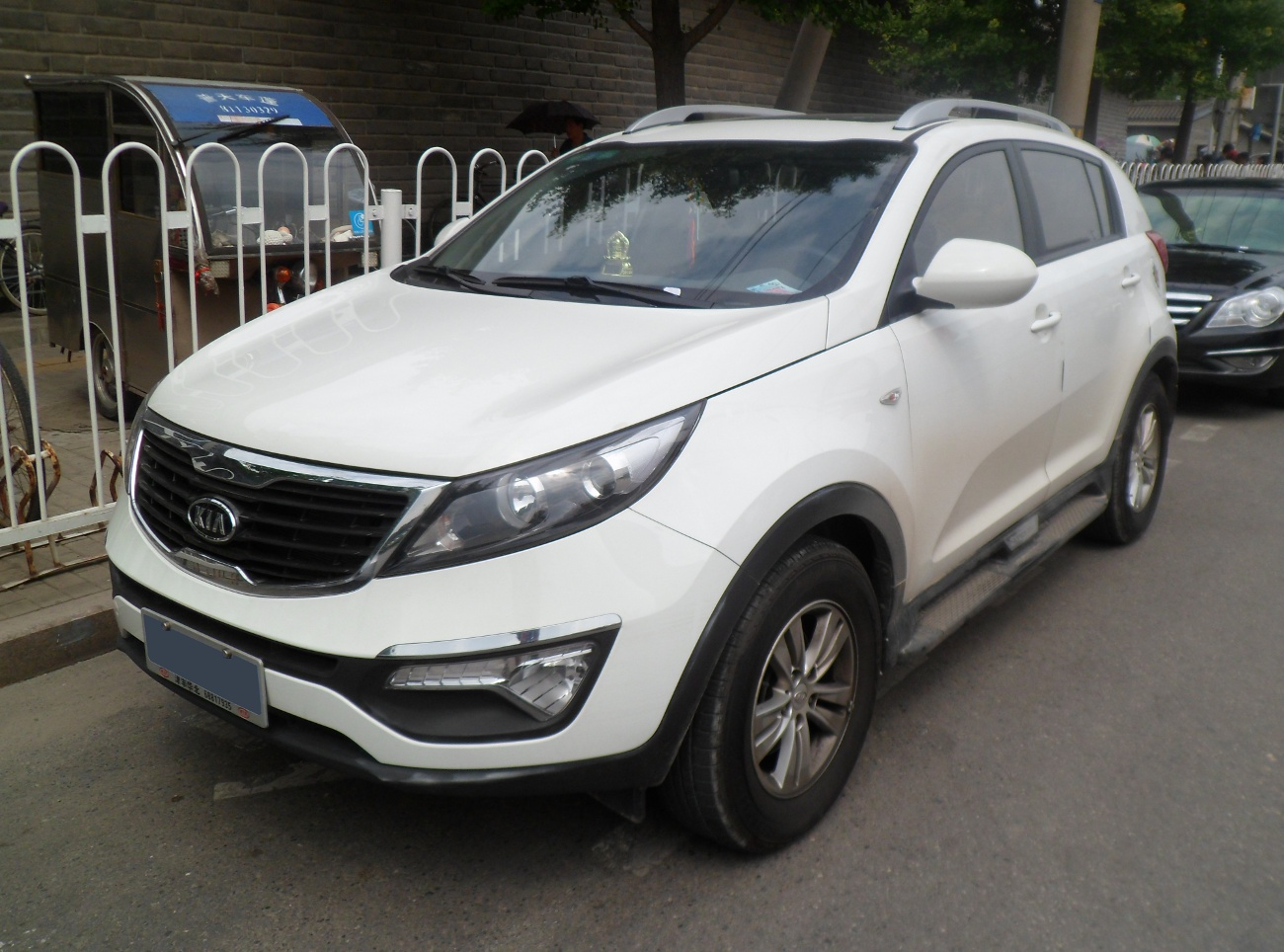
Kia Sportage R

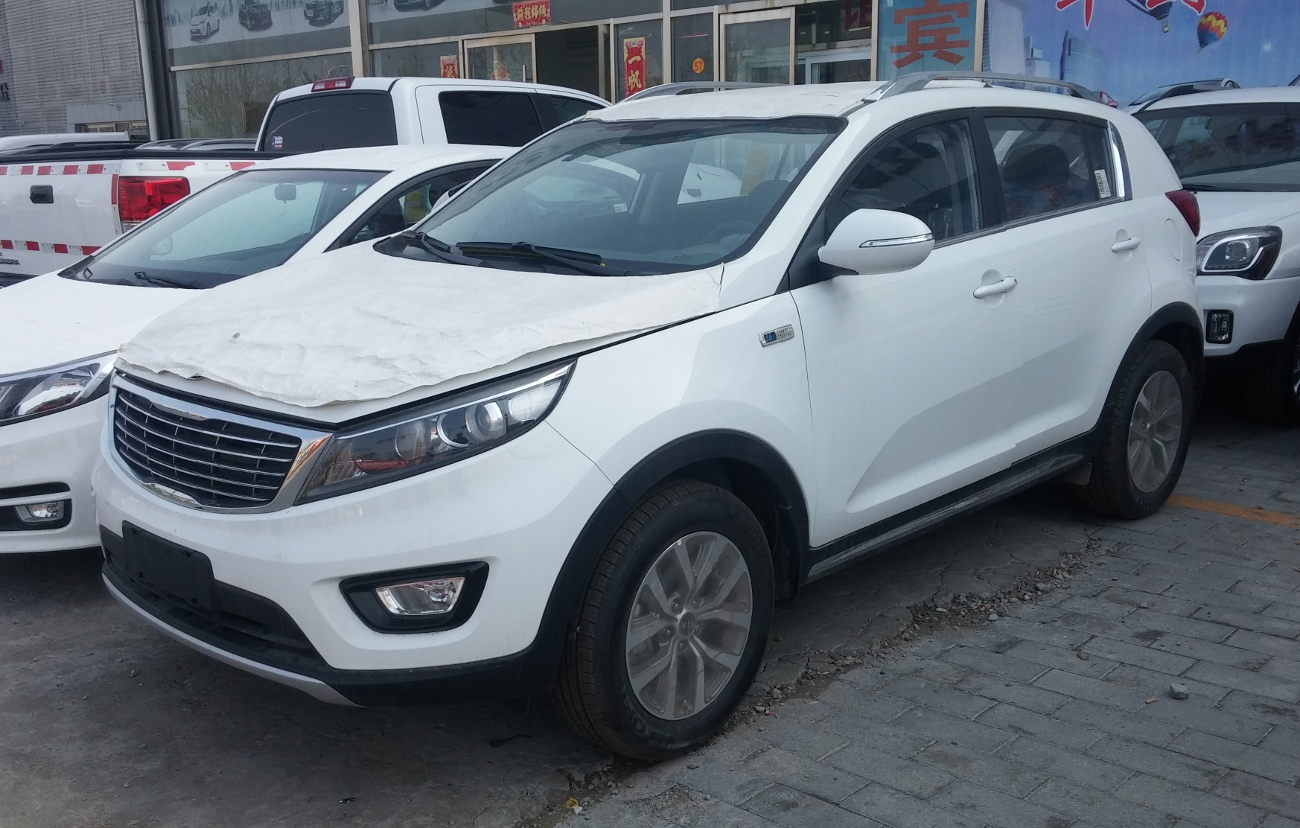
Kia Sportage R facelift

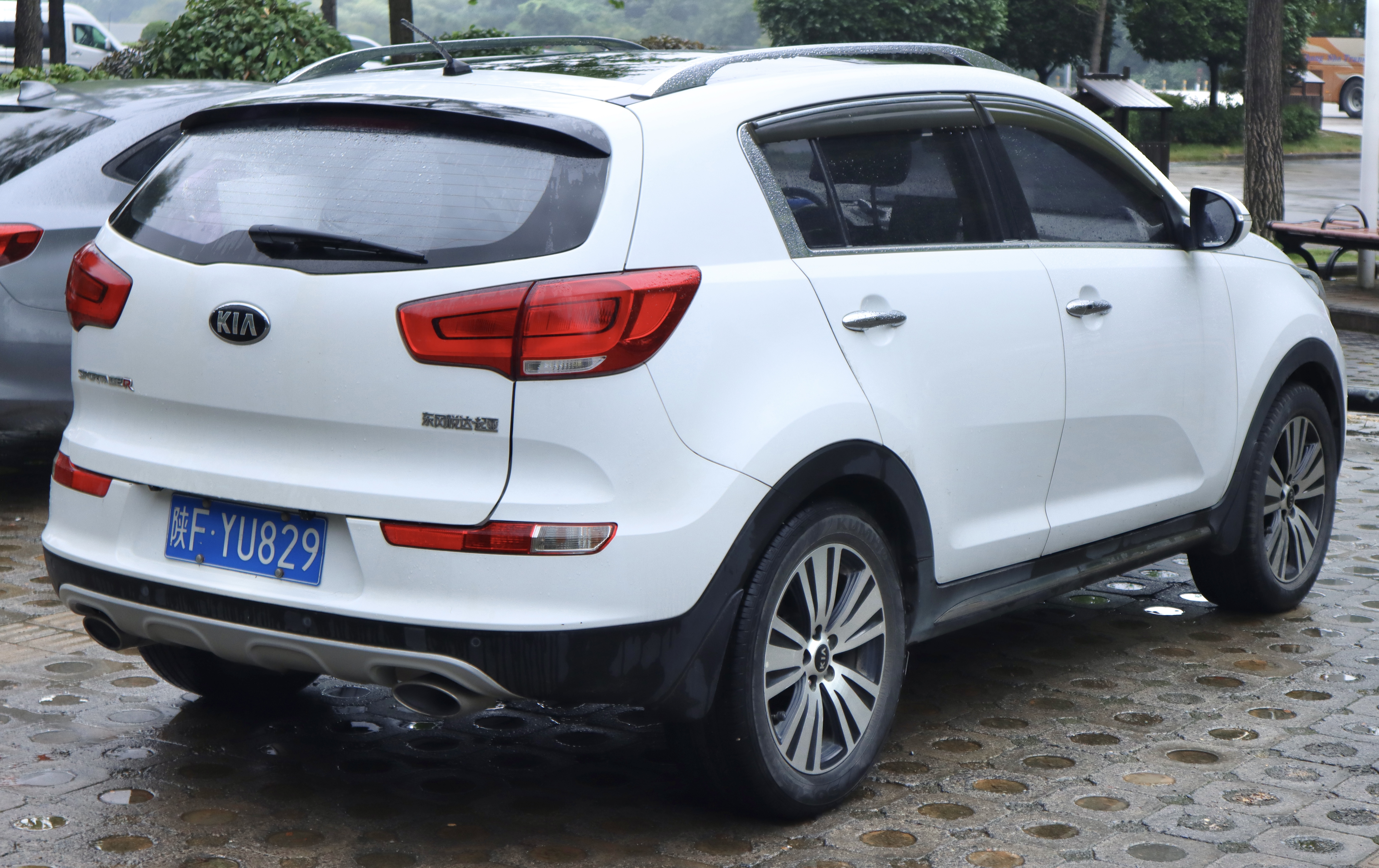
Kia Sportage R facelift (Rear)

== Third generation (NP; 2018) ==
Third generation
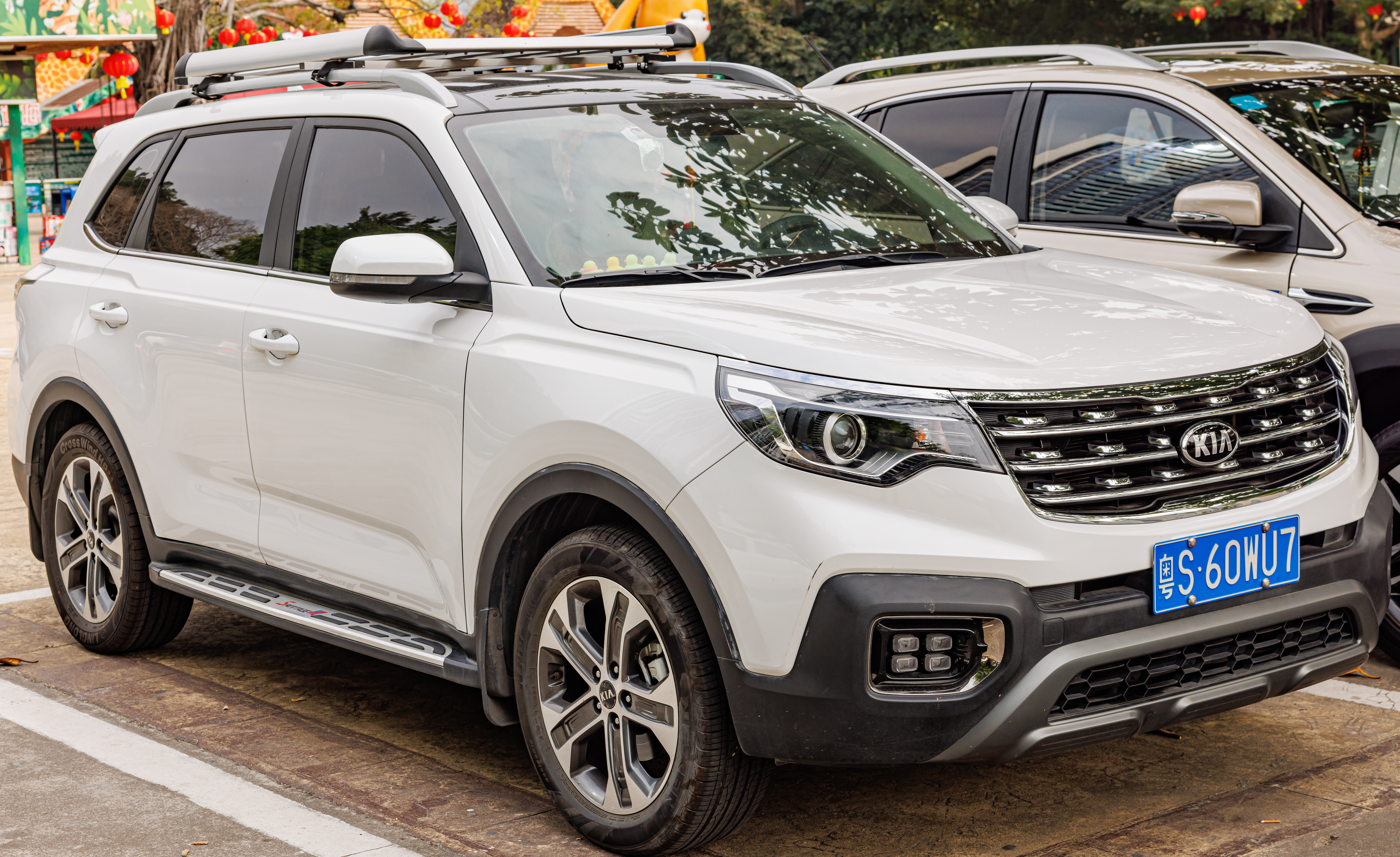

Overview
- Model code: NP
- Production: 2018–present
- Designer: Peter Schreyer

Body and chassis
- Related: Hyundai ix35 (NU)

Powertrain
- Engine: 1.5 L Smartstream G1.5 T-GDi I4; 2.0 L Nu GDi I4
- Transmission: 6-speed manual; 6-speed automatic; 7-speed DCT automatic

Dimensions
- Wheelbase: 2,640 mm (103.9 in)
- Length: 4,460 mm (175.6 in); 4,530 mm (178.3 in)
- Width: 1,850 mm (72.8 in)
- Height: 1,695 mm (66.7 in); 1,700 mm (66.9 in)
- Curb weight: 1,423–1,498 kg (3,137–3,303 lb)

The third-generation Chinese Sportage was revealed at the 2017 Shanghai Auto Show in China. It was previewed by the Kia NP Concept revealed during the 2017 Guangzhou Auto Show. The production version was available to China in early 2018.

The Kia Sportage III is based on the Hyundai ix35 which shares the same platform with the Chinese second generation Hyundai ix35. The Kia Sportage III is powered by a 2.0-litre G4NJ inline-four engine producing 118 kW (161 PS; 159 hp).

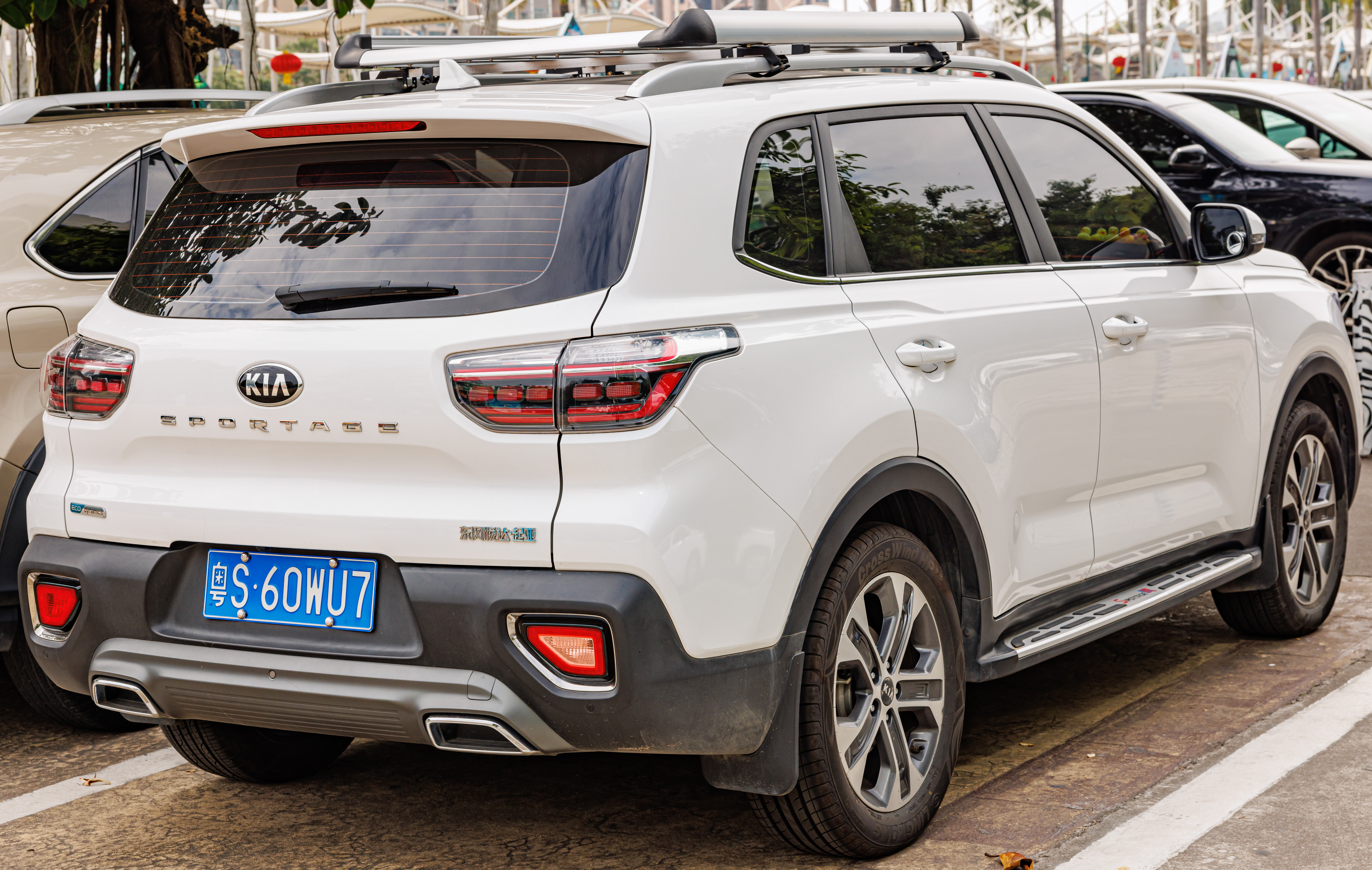
Rear view

=== Kia Sportage Ace (2021 facelift) ===
A facelift called the Kia Sportage Ace was launched during the 2020 Guangzhou Auto Show. The Sportage Ace features completely redesigned front and rear ends adding 40 mm (1.6 in) to the vehicle length with the updated headlamps integrated into the silhouette of the grilles and the tail lamps being vertical compared to the horizontal ones extending into the tailgate of the pre-facelift model. The Sportage Ace also features a 1.5-litre turbo engine producing 147 kW (200 PS; 197 hp).

Kia Sportage Ace

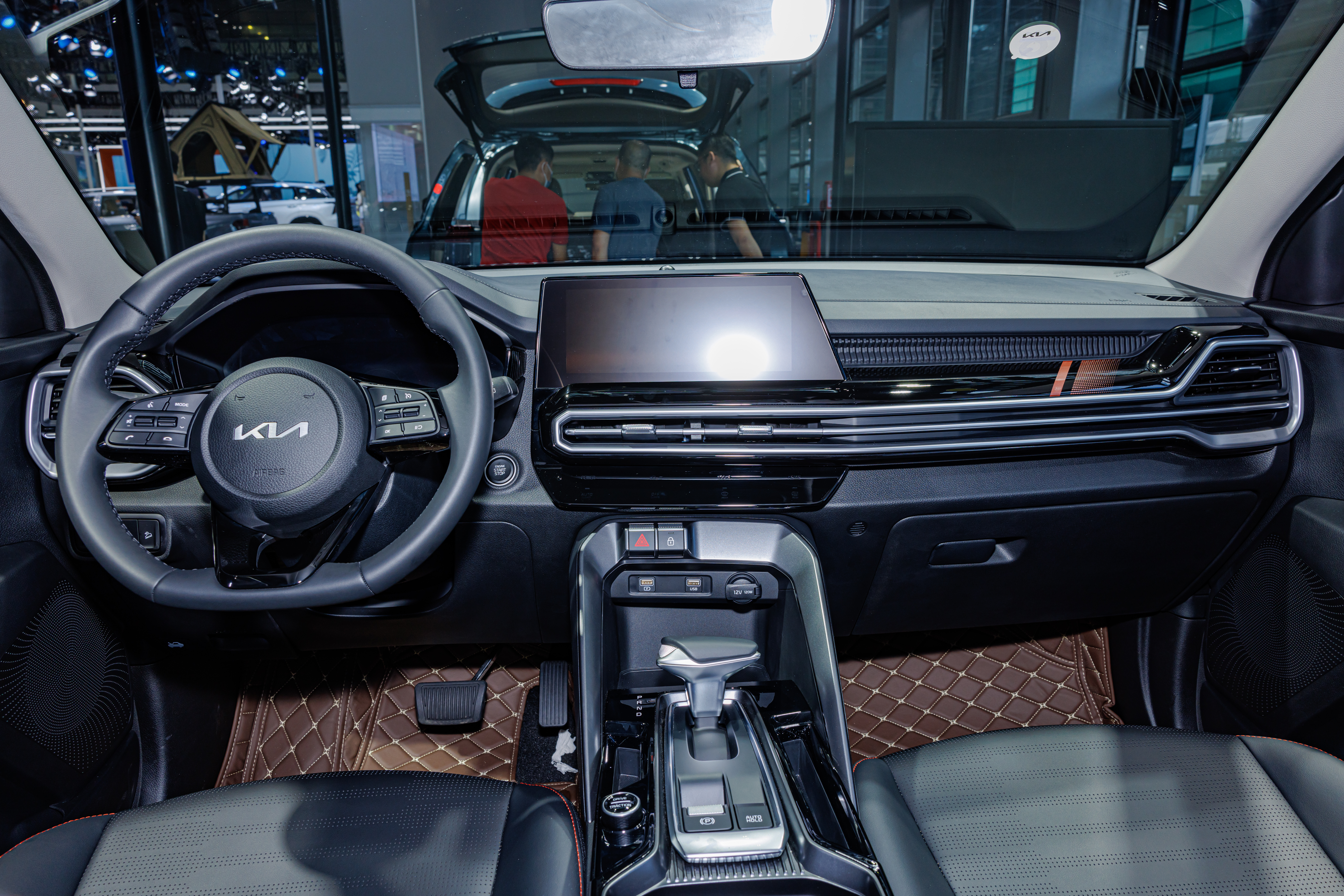
Interior

== Fourth generation (NQ5; 2022) ==
The fourth generation Kia Sportage (Chinese: 起亚狮铂拓界; pinyin: Qǐyà Shībótàjiè) on China was sold in 2022.

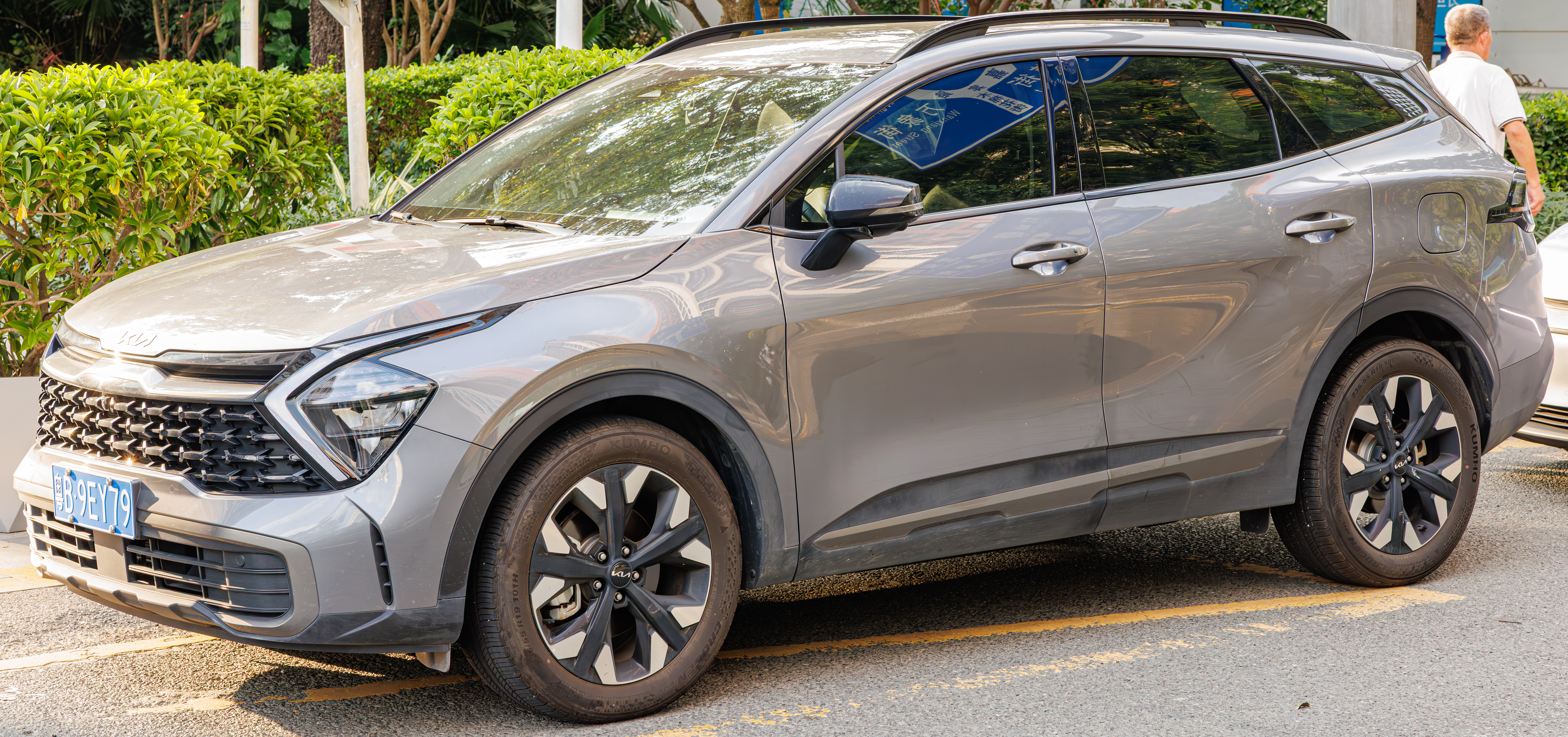
Kia Sportage (NQ5)

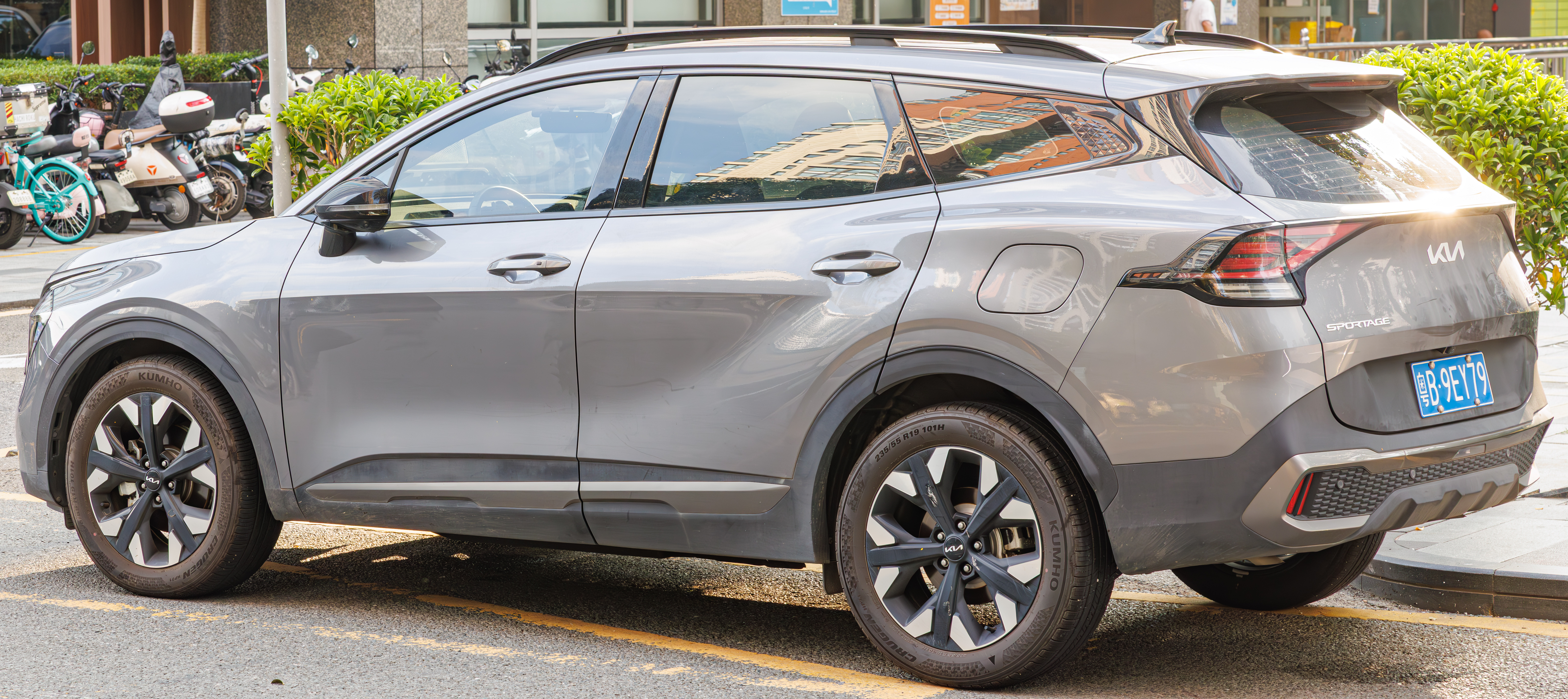
Kia Sportage (NQ5) (Rear)

== Sales ==
Year	China
2023	10,482
2024	2,610
2025	993
