= Hyundai ix35 (China) =

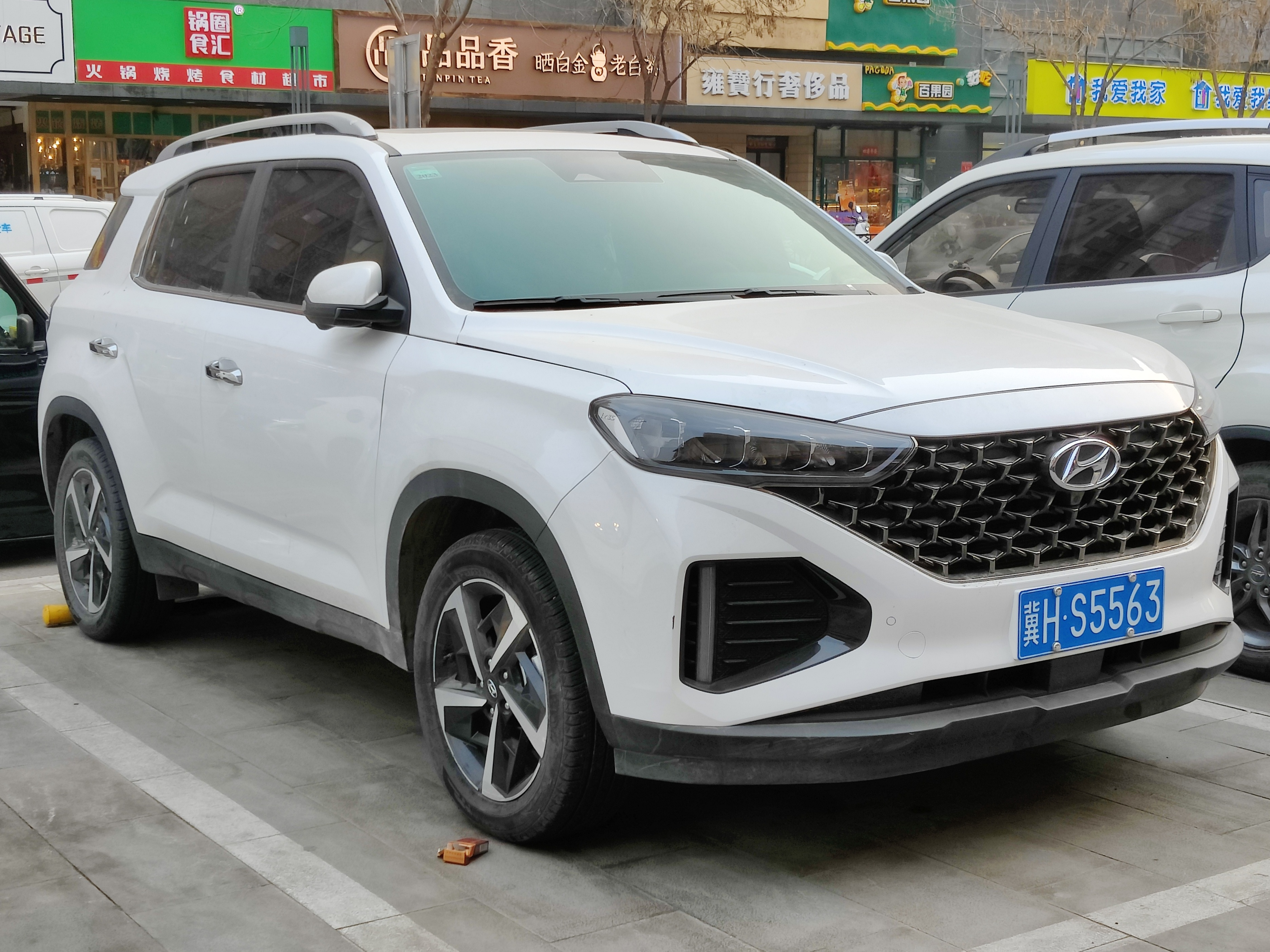

Overview
- Manufacturer: Hyundai
- Also called: Hyundai Tucson (2010–2017)
- Production: 2010–2023

Body and chassis
- Class: Compact SUV
- Body style: 5-door crossover SUV
- Layout: Front-engine, front-wheel-drive or Front-engine, four-wheel drive

Chronology
- Successor: Hyundai Mufasa

The Hyundai ix35 is a compact SUV produced by Beijing Hyundai while the predecessing Hyundai Tucson was sold in China alongside as a cheaper alternative next to the Hyundai ix35 (international second generation Hyundai Tucson). The ix35 name was introduced by Hyundai in 2009 with the launch of the second generation Tucson crossover, but only outside South Korea and North America. From 2015, with the introduction of the third generation model, the model was again sold as the Tucson. In China, Beijing Hyundai kept the ix35 as an independent model, due to its high demand. As a result, the Tucson and ix35 crossovers were sold alongside in the same market.

== First generation (LM; 2010) ==
The first generation Chinese market Hyundai ix35 was the same as the European version (known by the project name LM) unveiled at the 2009 Frankfurt Motor Show and commenced production in April 2010.

A facelift was launched in August 2013 with the updated design being the same version sold in South Korea, while different from the rest of the world. Price of the post-facelift first generation ix35 starts at 149,800 yuan and ends at 222,800 yuan in China. Engines powering the ix35 in China is a 160 hp (119 kW; 162 PS) 2.0-liter Nu engine and a 170 hp (127 kW; 172 PS) 2.4-liter Theta engine.

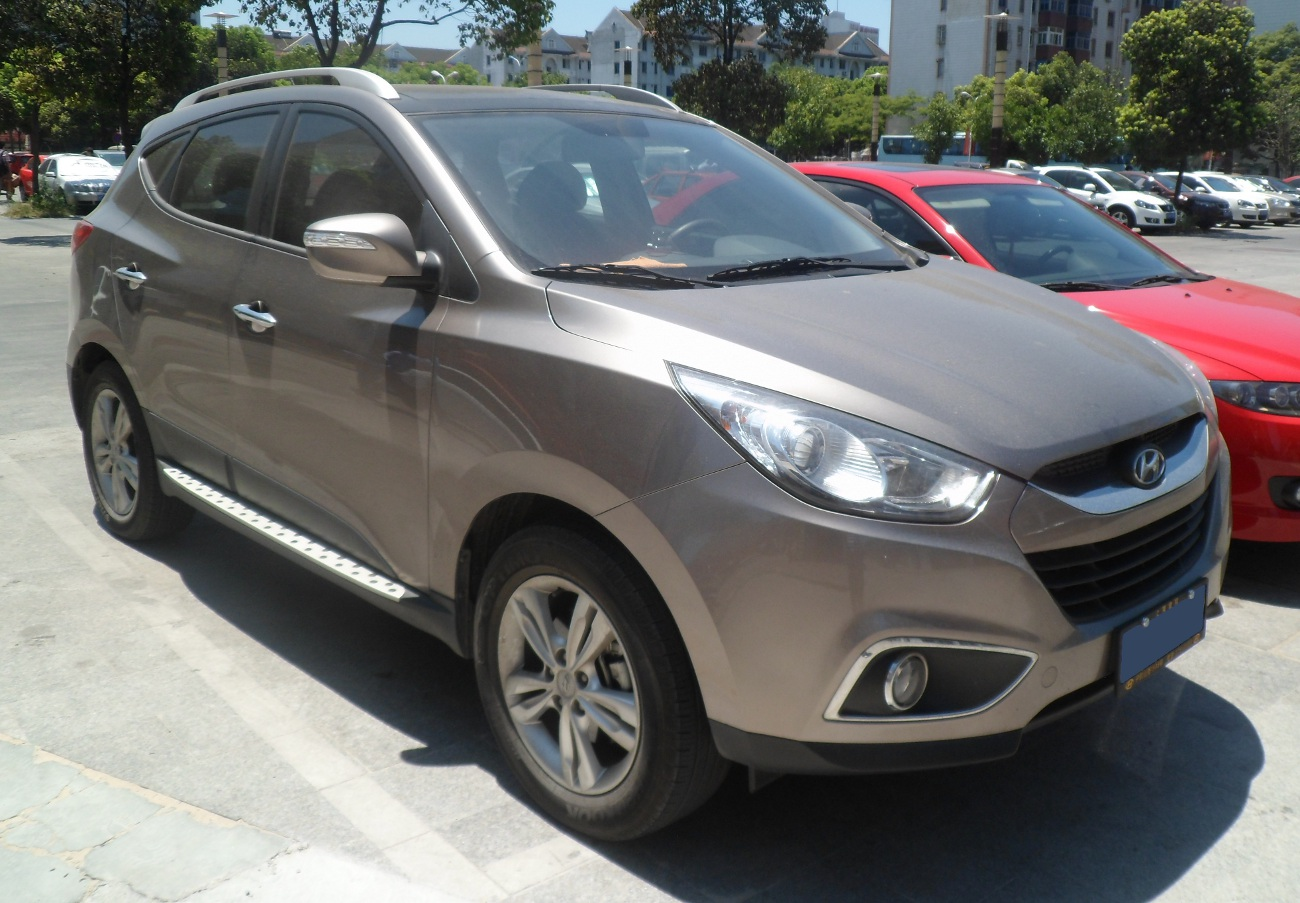
Hyundai ix35 (pre-facelift)

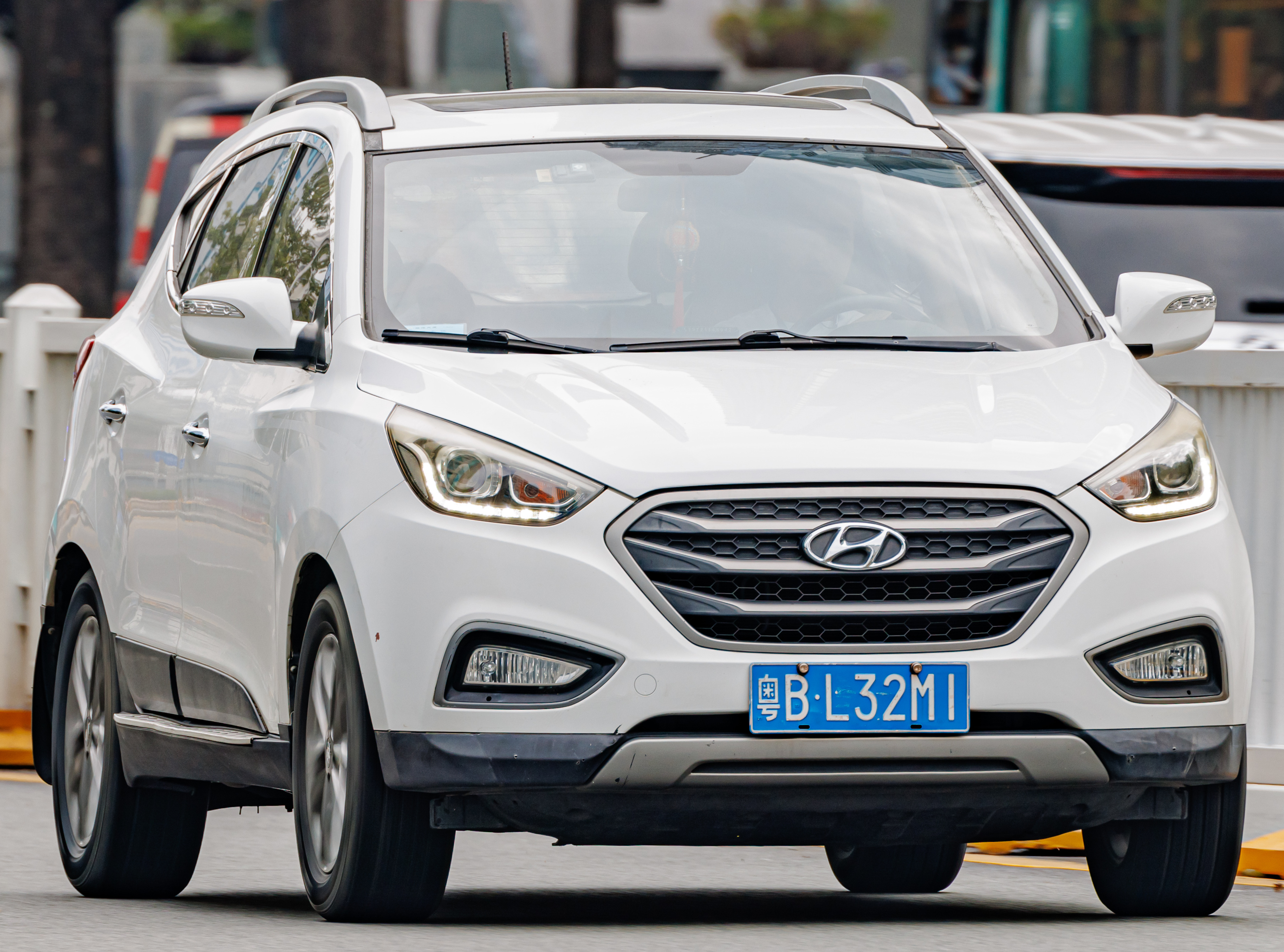
Hyundai ix35 (facelift)

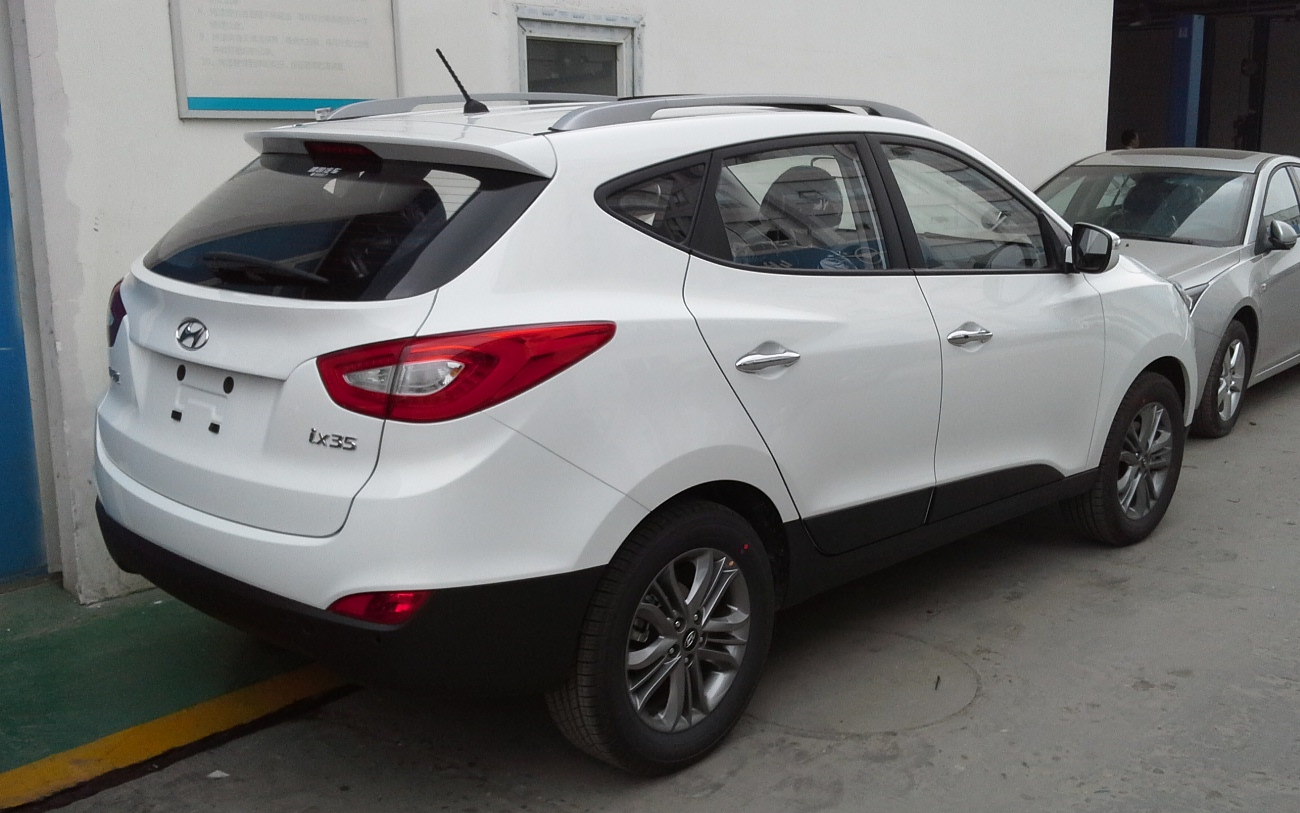
Hyundai ix35 (facelift)

== Second generation (NU; 2017) ==
Second generation
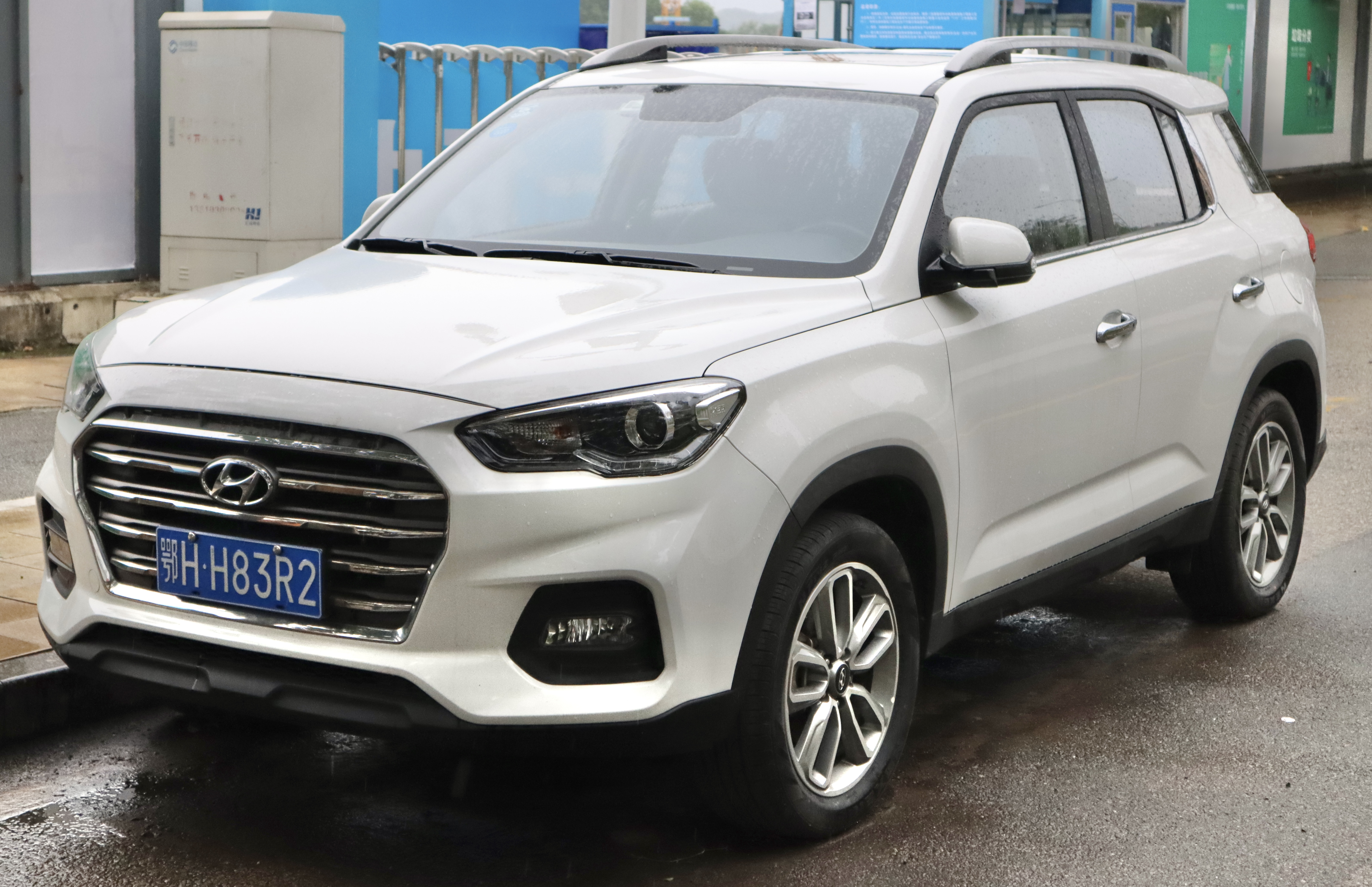

Overview
- Model code: NU
- Production: 2017–2023
- Assembly: China: Beijing (Beijing Hyundai)

Body and chassis
- Related: Kia Sportage (NP)

Powertrain
- Engine: 2.0 L Nu I4 (petrol)
- Transmission: 6-speed manual 6-speed automatic

Dimensions
- Wheelbase: 2,640 mm (103.9 in)
- Length: 4,485–4,500 mm (176.6–177.2 in)
- Width: 1,850 mm (72.8 in)
- Height: 1,680 mm (66.1 in)

Chronology
- Successor: Hyundai Tucson (4th generation)

The second generation Hyundai ix35 was revealed on the 2017 Shanghai Auto Show in China, it was available to the Chinese car market in Q3 2017. It is based on the original Hyundai ix35, and retains the 160 hp (119 kW; 162 PS) 2.0L engine with an additional 130 hp (97 kW; 132 PS) 1.4L turbo engine as an option. In China, the third generation Hyundai Tucson in foreign markets (second generation of the Tucson to use the ix35 name outside of China) was sold alongside as the successor of the first generation Hyundai Tucson.

In terms of sales, in 2018, 139,659 units were sold, and in 2019, 131,894 units were delivered. However, the sales of the first seven months of 2020 is only 31,710 units.

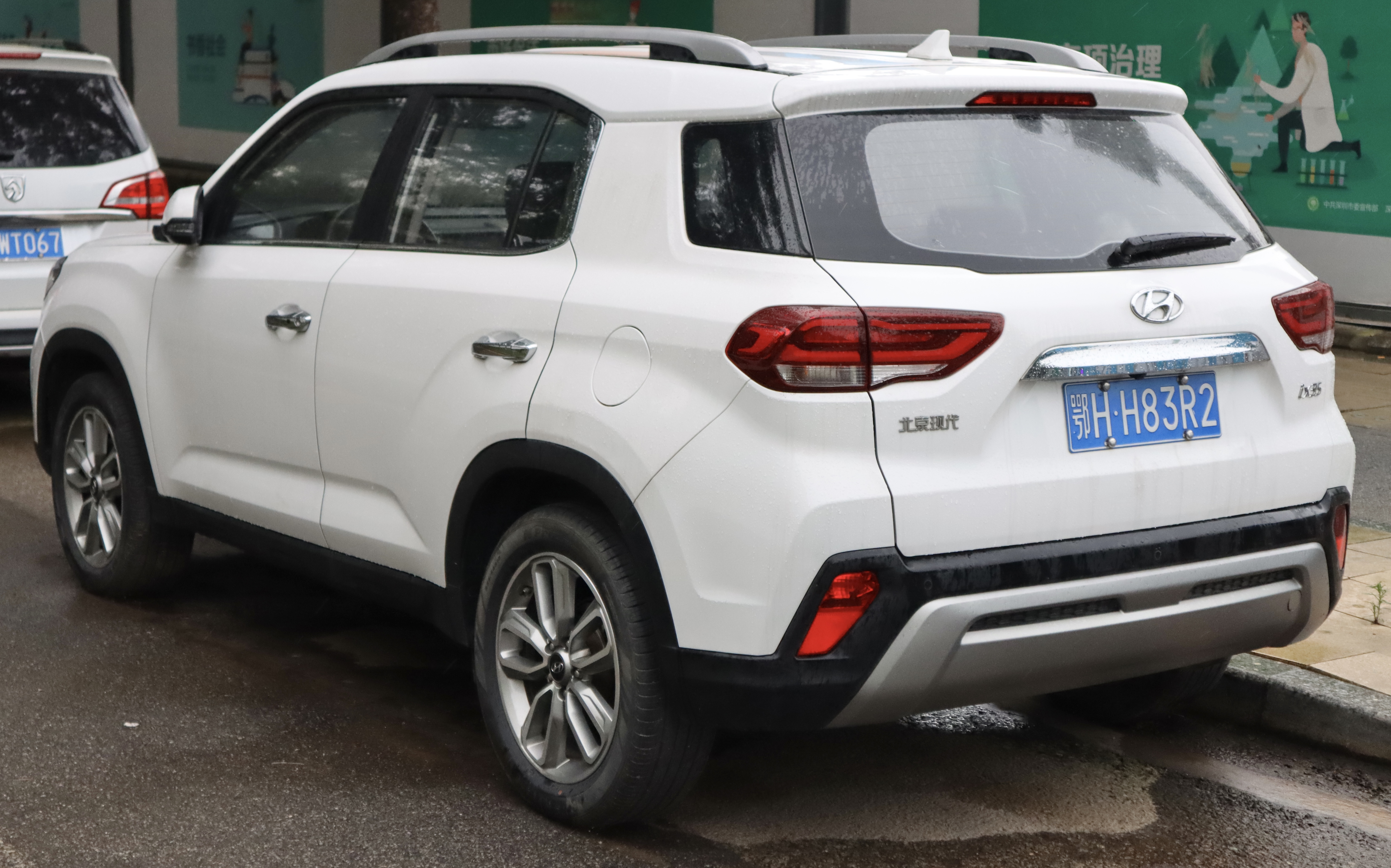
Rear view (pre-facelift)

=== 2020 facelift ===
A facelift for the 2021 model year was unveiled during the 2020 Guangzhou Auto Show. The post-facelift second generation ix35 for China features redesigned front and rear ends extending the vehicle length to 4,500 mm (177.2 in), adding an extra 15 mm (0.6 in) to the pre-facelift model. Engines and transmission options remains the same as the pre-facelift model. The Hyundai emblem on the rear was replaced with spelled-out Hyundai lettering with big spacing resembling newer Volvo, Lexus, and Škoda models.

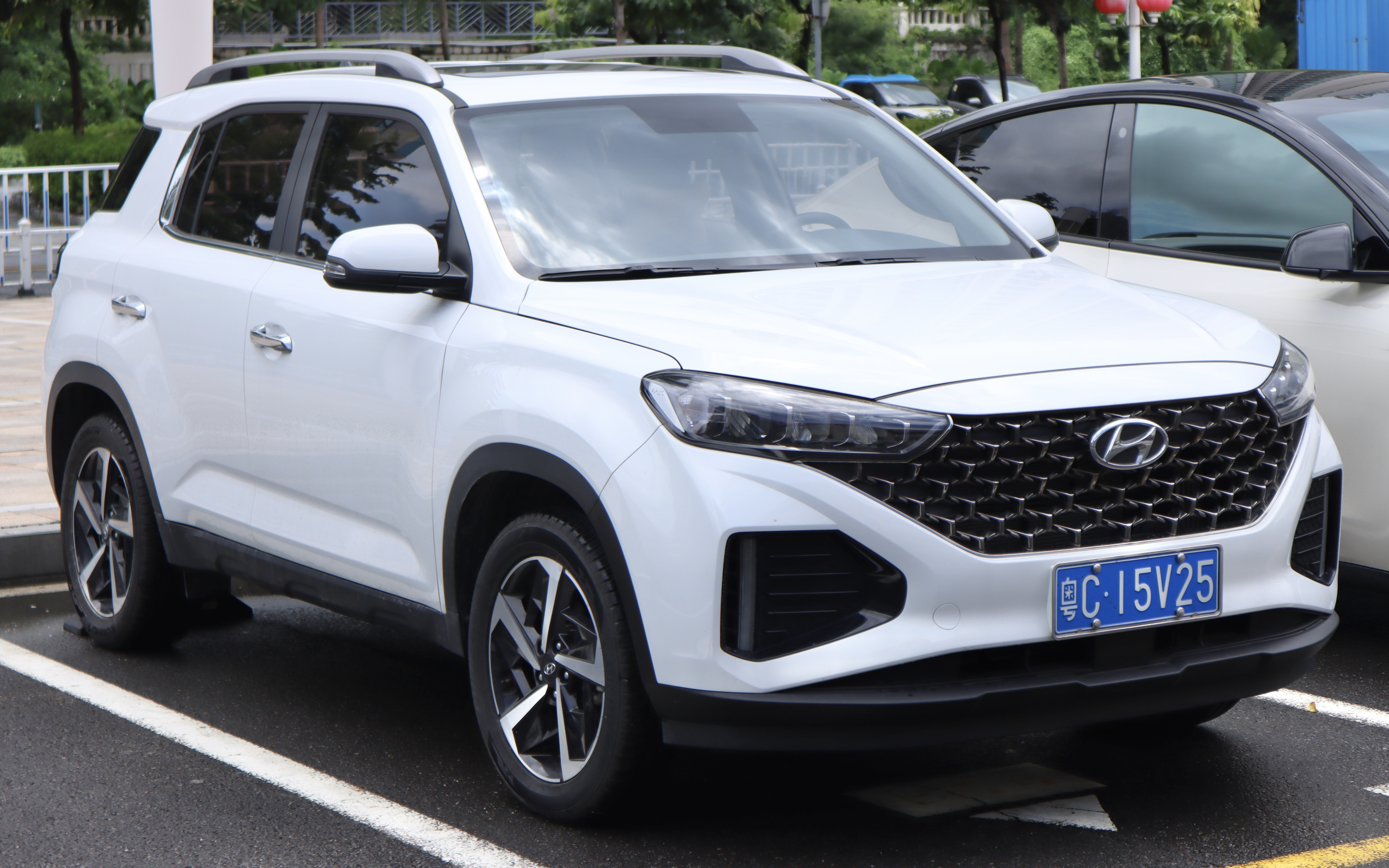
2021 Hyundai ix35 (facelift)

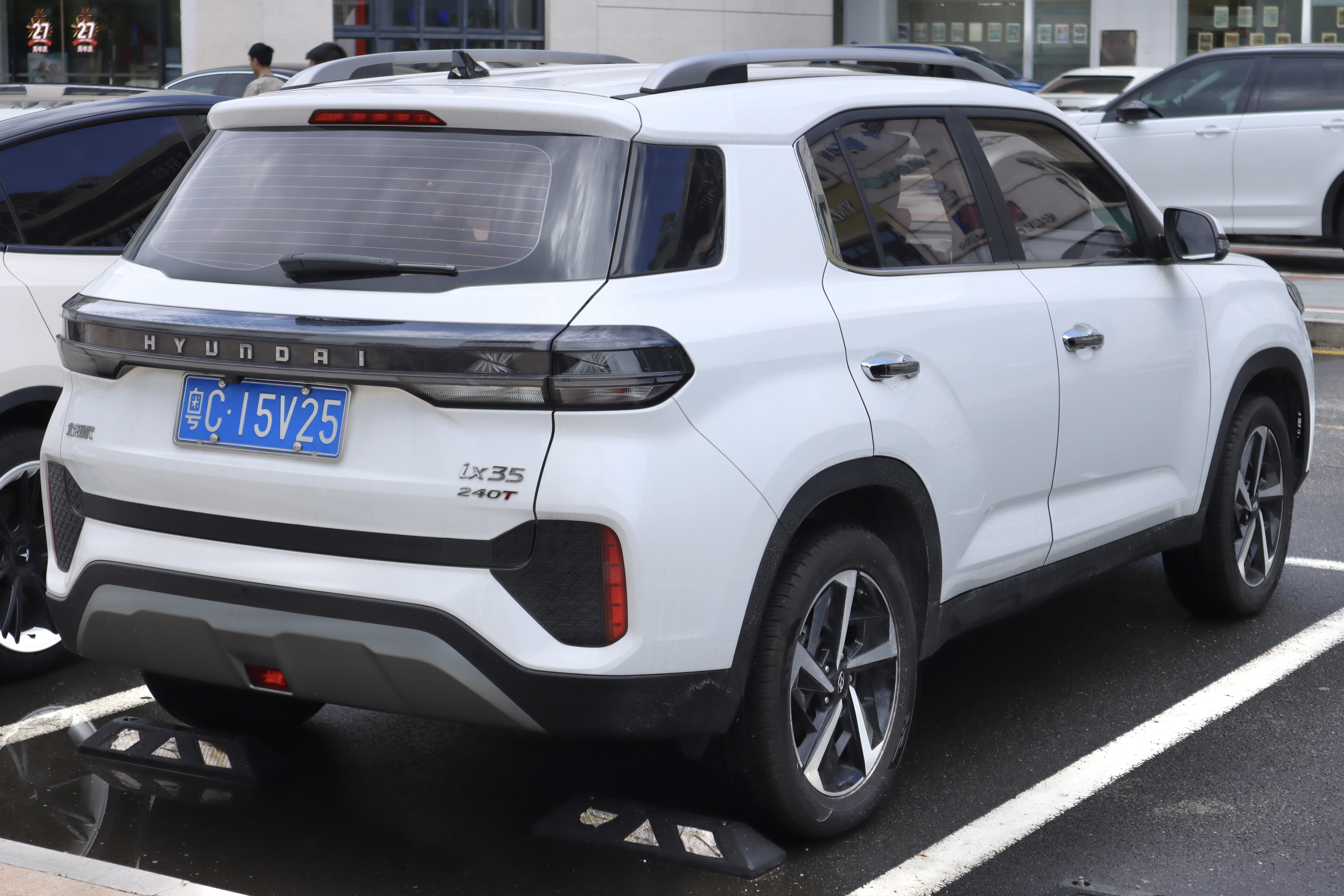
2021 Hyundai ix35 (facelift)

== Sales ==
Year	China
2018	139,659
2019	131,894
2020	
2021	
2022	
2023	47,662
2024	21,645
2025	6,038
