= Kia K5 =

Mid-size car

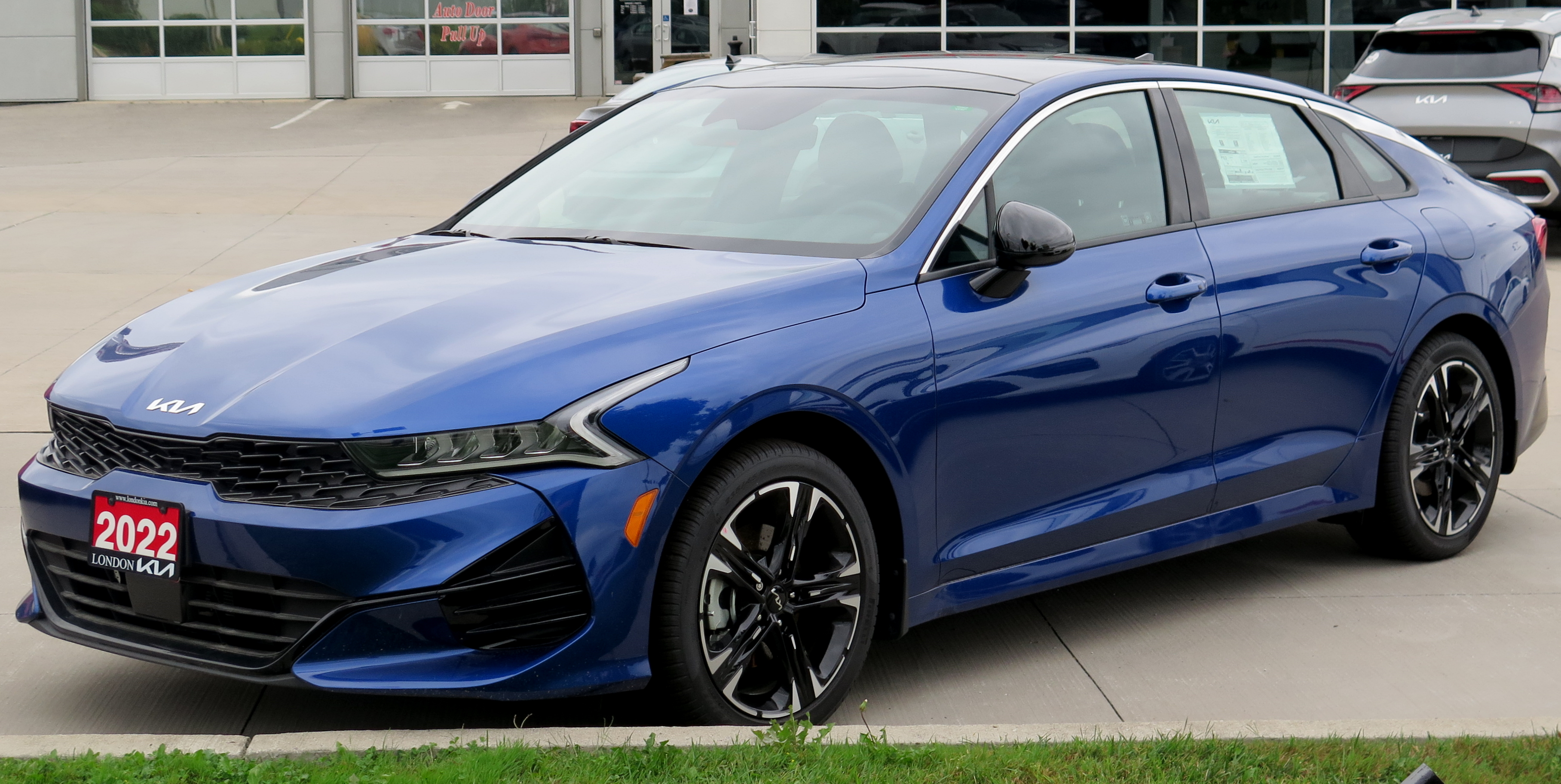
- 2022 Kia K5 GT-Line (DL3)

Overview
- Manufacturer: Kia
- Also called: Kia Magentis (2000–2010); Kia Optima (2000–2020); Kia Lotze (2005–2010)
- Production: 2000–present
- Model years: 2001–present

Body and chassis
- Class: Mid-size car (D)
- Layout: Front-engine, front-wheel-drive Front-engine, four-wheel-drive (2020–present)

Chronology
- Predecessor: Kia Credos

The Kia K5 (Korean: 기아 K5), formerly known as the Kia Optima (Korean: 기아 옵티마), is a mid-size car manufactured by Kia since 2000 and marketed globally through various nameplates. First generation cars were mostly marketed as the Optima, although the Kia Magentis name was used in Europe and Canada when sales began there in 2002. For the second-generation models, Kia used the Kia Lotze and Kia K5 name for the South Korean market, and the Magentis name globally, except in the United States, Canada, Malaysia and the Middle East, where the Optima name was retained until the 2021 model year. The K5 name is used for all markets since the introduction of the fifth generation in 2019.

== First generation (MS; 2000) ==
Kia Optima (first generation)
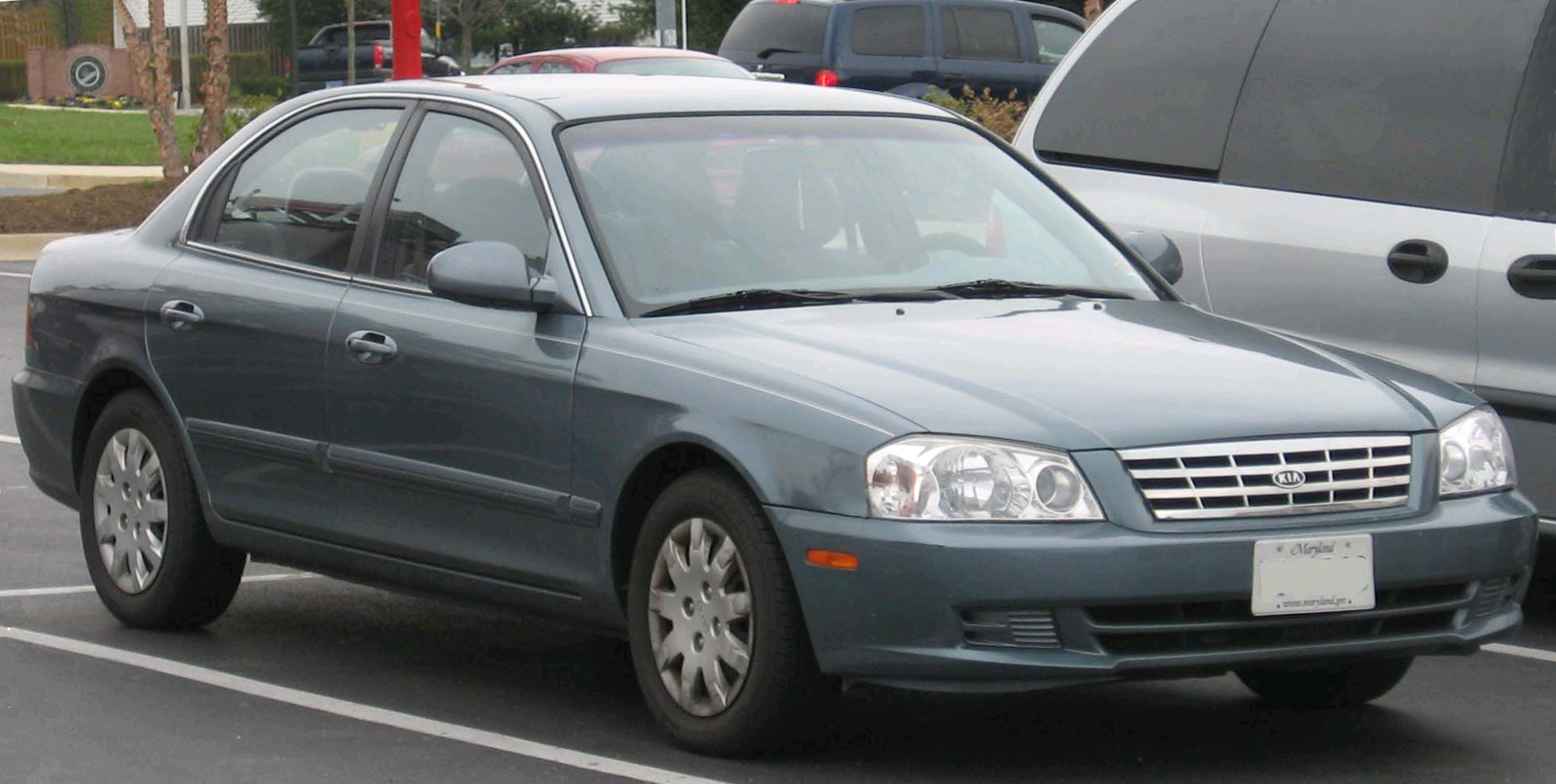

Overview
- Model code: MS
- Also called: Kia Magentis; Kia Optima
- Production: 2000–2006; 2004–2011 (China)
- Model years: 2001–2005 (North America)
- Assembly: South Korea: Hwaseong (Hwaseong Plant); China: Yancheng (Yancheng Plant); Russia: Kaliningrad (Avtotor)

Body and chassis
- Body style: 4-door sedan
- Platform: Hyundai-Kia Y4
- Related: Hyundai Sonata

Powertrain
- Engine: Gasoline: 1.8 L Hyundai Beta II DOHC I4; 1.8 L Sirius II I4; 2.0 L Sirius II I4; 2.4 L Sirius II I4; 2.5 L Delta V6; 2.7 L Delta V6
- Transmission: 5-speed manual; 4-speed automatic; CVT

Dimensions
- Wheelbase: 2,700 mm (106.3 in)
- Length: 4,745 mm (186.8 in)
- Width: 2000–2005: 1,815 mm (71.5 in); 2002–2005: 1,820 mm (72 in)
- Height: 1,420 mm (55.9 in)

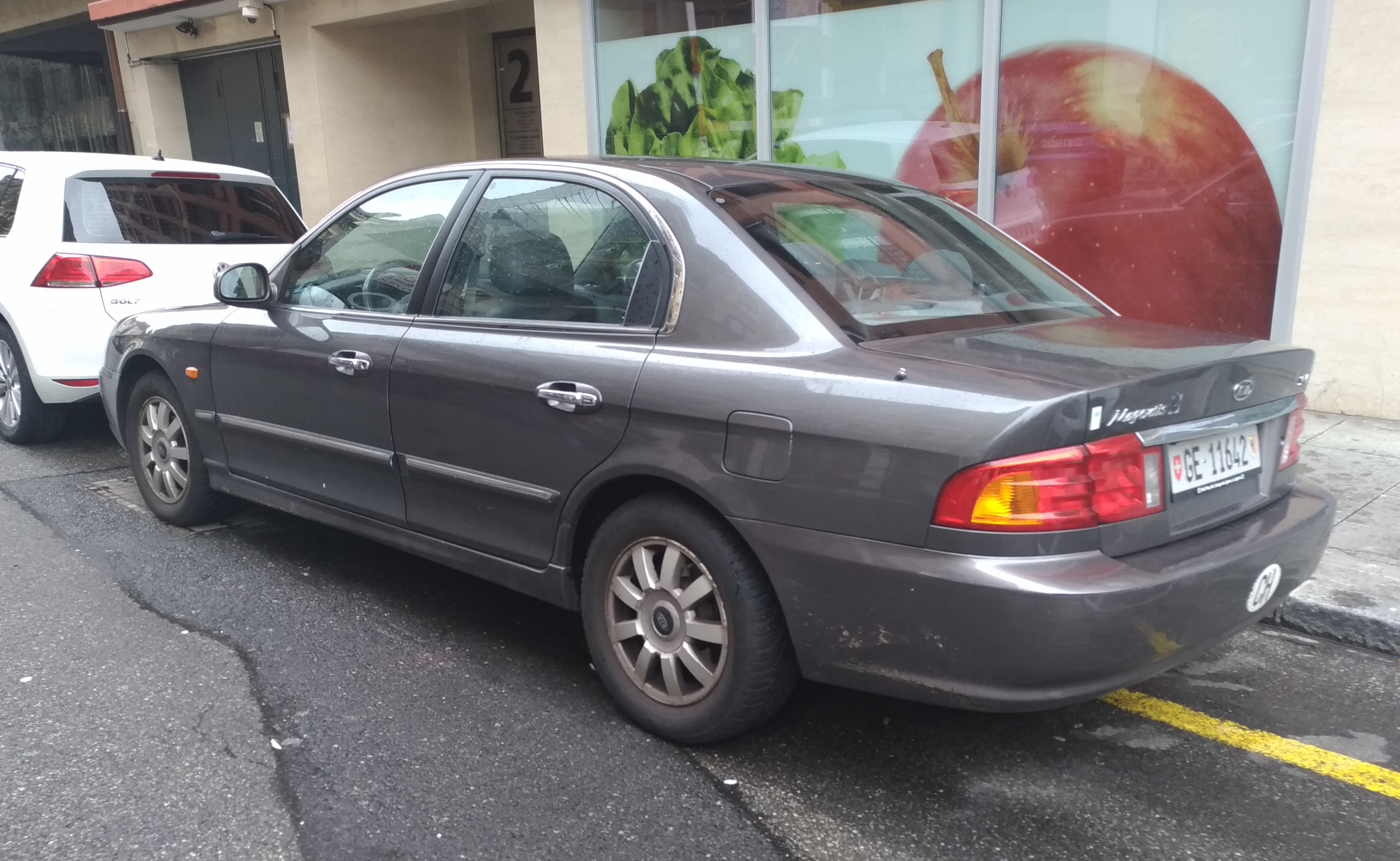
Rear (pre-facelift)

From 2000–2005, Optimas were a rebadged variant of the Hyundai Sonata, differing from the Sonata only in minor exterior styling details and equipment content. It was first shown in South Korea in July 2000 and was the first product of the Kia-Hyundai platform integration plan.

In Australia, the Optima was introduced in May 2001, offered only with a 2.5 L V6 engine, and choice of manual or automatic transmission. The updated Optima was offered with a new 2.7 L engine, 4-speed automatic (the manual was dropped), and features such as full leather interior and alloy wheels were made standard. Thanks in part to better marketing, sales increased to 41,289 units in 2005, an all-time high. The Optima was sold until 2006, when it was replaced by the Magentis.

=== Safety ===
The 2001 Optima received Poor to Average ratings from the Insurance Institute for Highway Safety (IIHS).

Test	Rating
Moderate overlap front:	Acceptable
Side:	Poor
Head restraints & seats:	Poor

=== Update ===
The 2002 Optima received a minor update. A luxurious version of the Optima was sold in South Korea as the "Optima Regal", using the 2-liter four or the 2.5-liter V6 only. The grille was redesigned for the United States in 2003 (2004 model year) to feature the Kia badge, and the headlamps were restyled for 2004 (2005 model year).

=== Engines ===
Type	Model Years	Power	Torque	Market
1,795 cc (109.5 cu in) 1.8 L Beta II I4	200?–2005	96 kW (131 PS; 129 hp) at 6000 rpm	164 N⋅m (121 lb⋅ft) at 4500 rpm	South Korea
1,997 cc (121.9 cu in) 2.0 L Sirius II I4	2001–2002	100 kW (136 PS; 134 hp) at 6000 rpm	180 N⋅m (133 lb⋅ft) at 4500 rpm	Global
2,351 cc (143.5 cu in) 2.4 L Sirius II I4	2001–2002	111 kW (151 PS; 149 hp) at 6000 rpm	212 N⋅m (156 lb⋅ft) at 4500 rpm	North America
2,351 cc (143.5 cu in) 2.4 L Sirius II I4	2003–2006	103 kW (140 PS; 138 hp) at 5500 rpm	199 N⋅m (147 lb⋅ft) at 3000 rpm	North America
2,493 cc (152.1 cu in) 2.5 L Delta V6	2001; 2000–2005	127 kW (172 PS; 170 hp) at 6000 rpm 124 kW (169 PS; 167 hp) at 6000 rpm	229 N⋅m (169 lb⋅ft) at 4000 rpm 230 N⋅m (170 lb⋅ft) at 4000 rpm	North America; Global
2,656 cc (162.1 cu in) 2.7 L Delta V6	2002–2006	127 kW (172 PS; 170 hp) at 6000 rpm	245 N⋅m (181 lb⋅ft) at 4000 rpm	North America

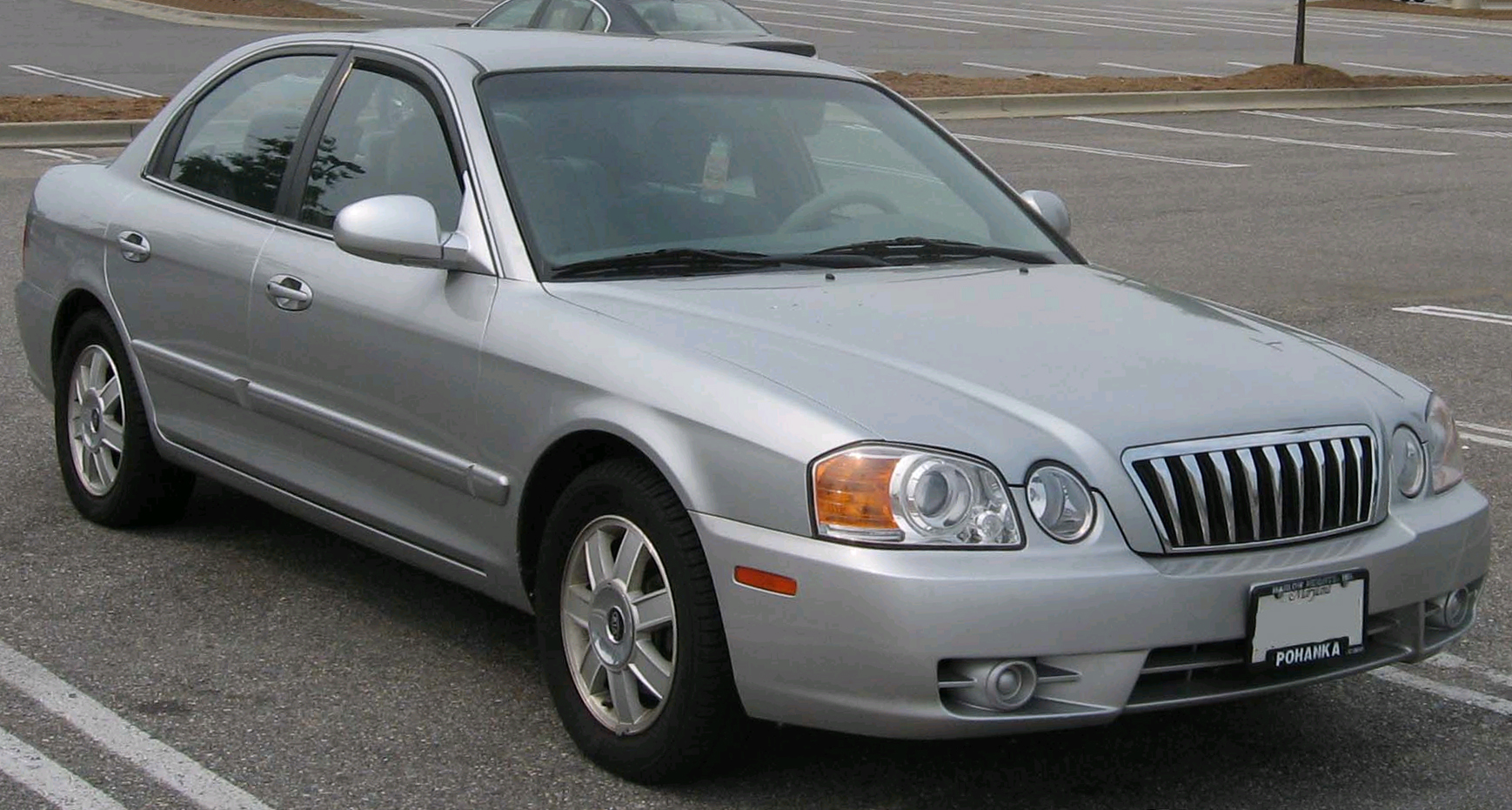
Kia Optima (US; first facelift)

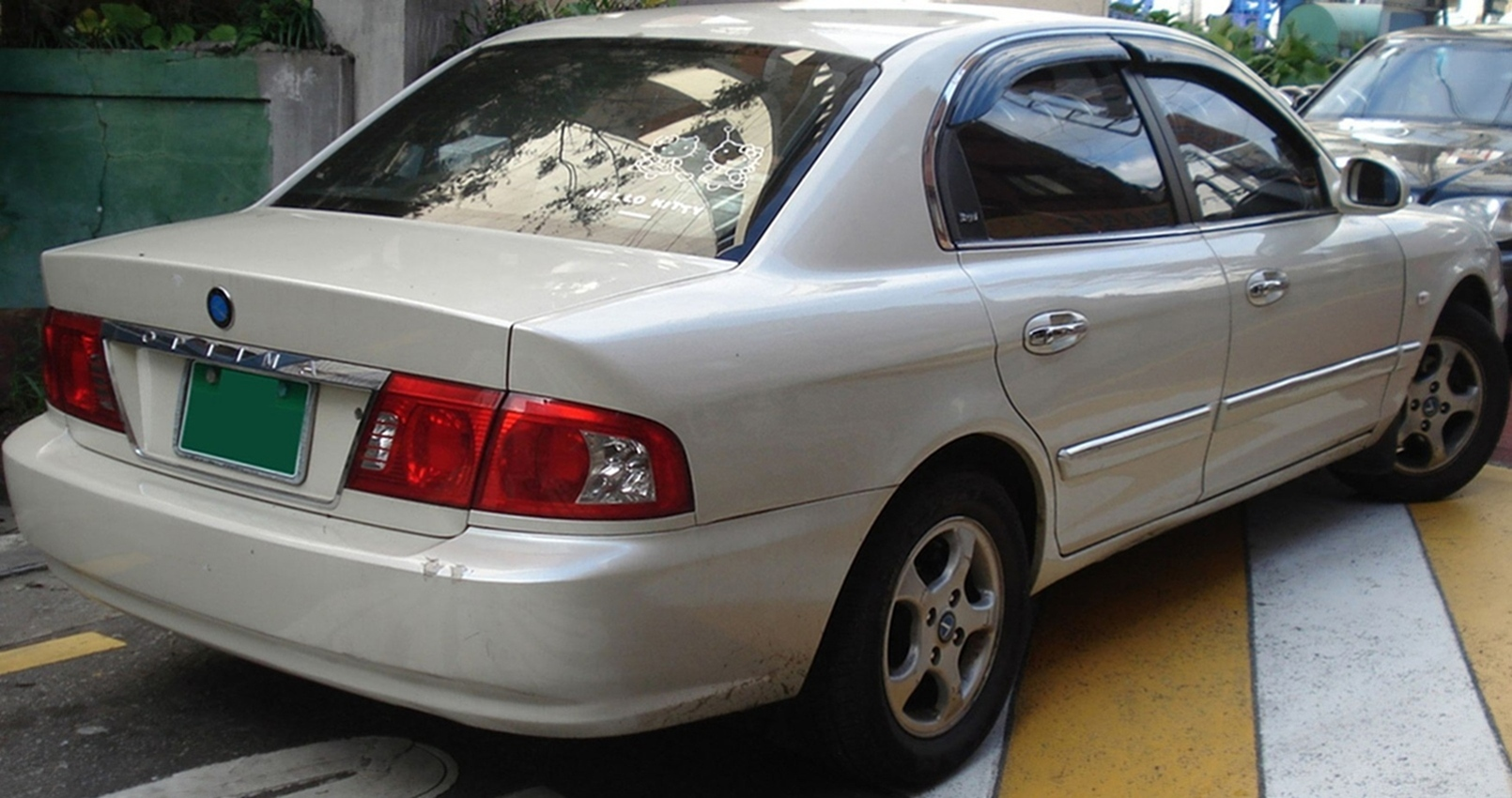
Kia Optima (Korea; first facelift)

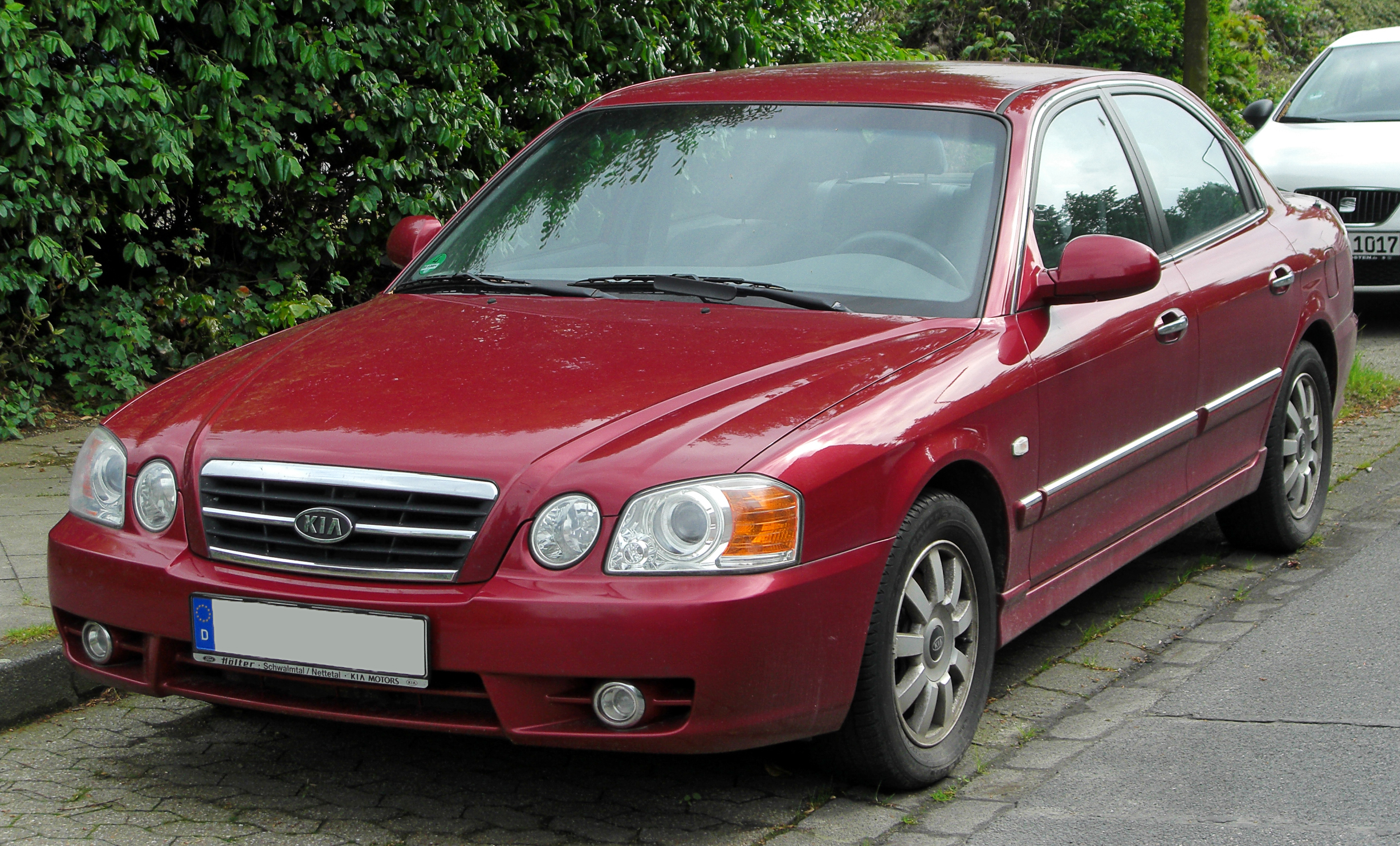
Kia Magentis (Europe; second facelift)

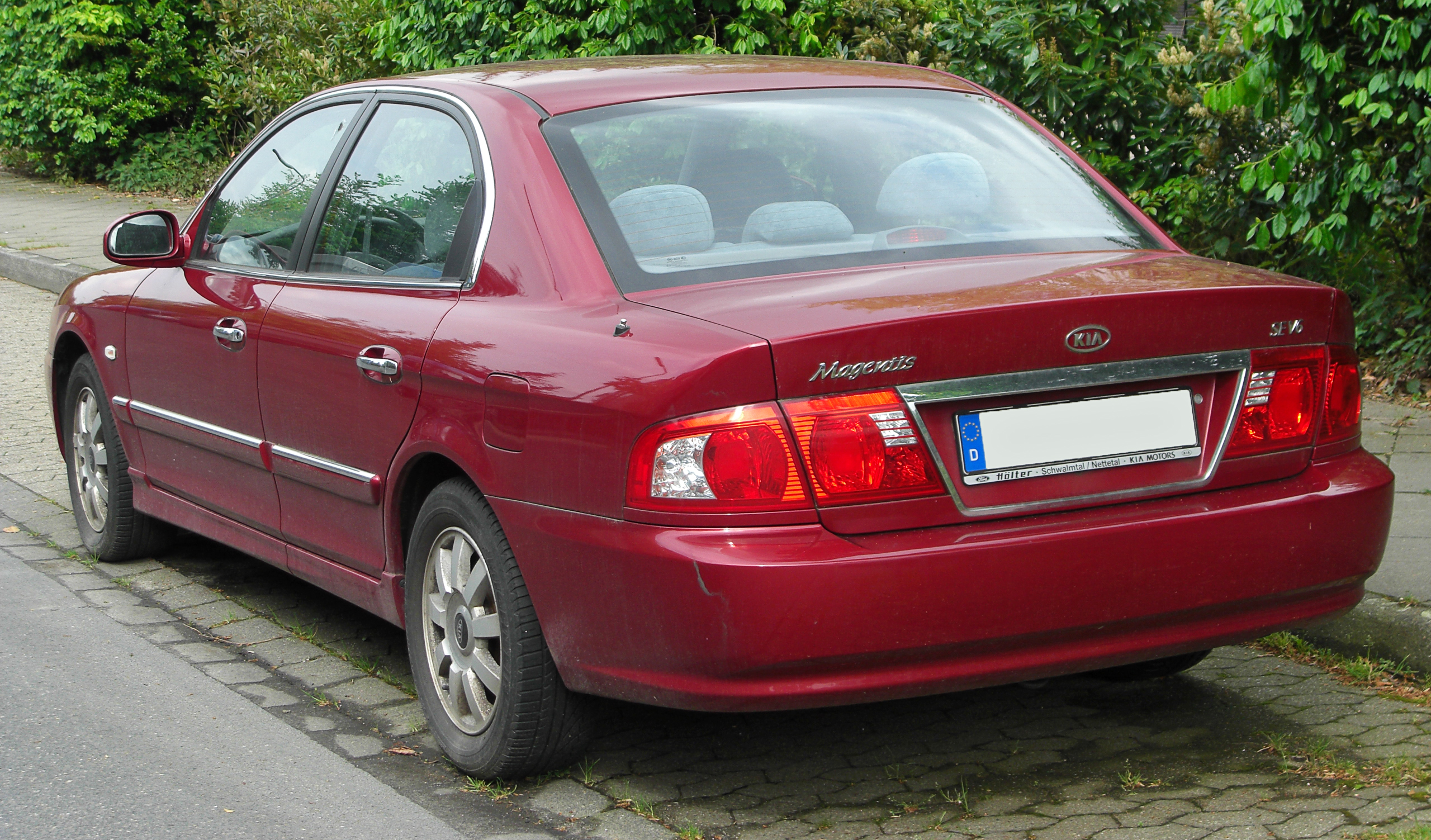
Kia Magentis (Europe; second facelift)

== Second generation (MG; 2005) ==
Kia Optima (second generation)
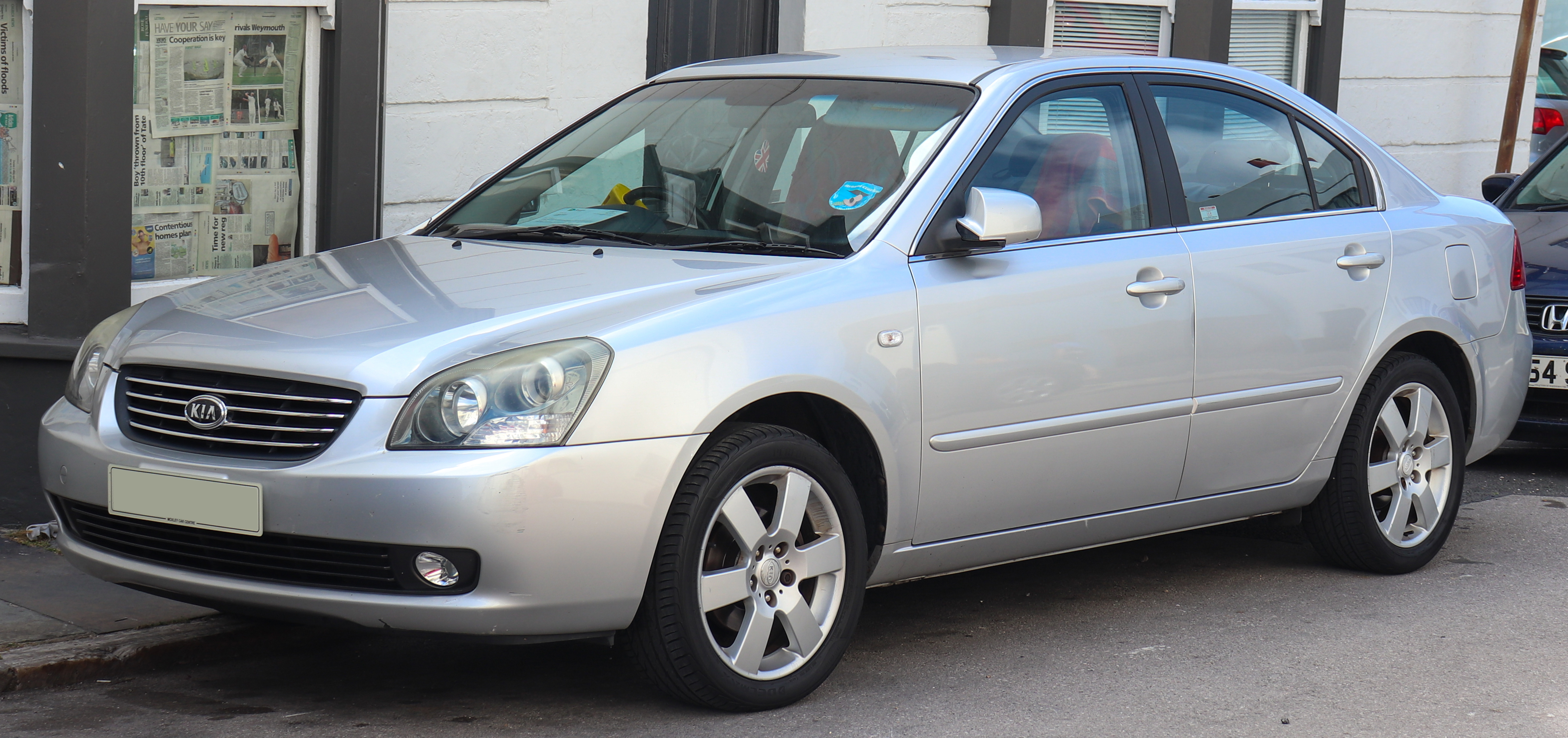
- 2008 Kia Magentis LS 2.0 (UK; pre-facelift)

Overview
- Model code: MG
- Also called: Kia Magentis; Kia Lotze (South Korea); Kia Optima
- Production: 2005–2010
- Model years: 2006–2010 (North America)
- Assembly: South Korea: Hwaseong (Hwaseong Plant); Malaysia: Gurun (NAM); Russia: Kaliningrad (Avtotor)
- Designer: Peter Schreyer

Body and chassis
- Body style: 4-door sedan
- Related: Hyundai Sonata; Hyundai Grandeur/Azera; Kia Carens/Rondo

Powertrain
- Engine: Gasoline: 1.8 L G4KB I4; 2.0 L G4KA I4; 2.4 L G4KC/G4KE I4; 2.7 L G6BA V6; 2.7 L G6EA V6; Gasoline/LPG: 2.4 L L4KA LPi I4; Diesel: 2.0 L Hyundai/VM Motori D4EA CRDi-VGT I4
- Transmission: 5-speed manual; 6-speed manual(2.0 L CRDI); 4-speed automatic; 5-speed automatic

Dimensions
- Wheelbase: 2,720 mm (107.1 in)
- Length: 4,755–4,810 mm (187.2–189.4 in)
- Width: 1,820 mm (71.7 in)
- Height: 1,480 mm (58.3 in)

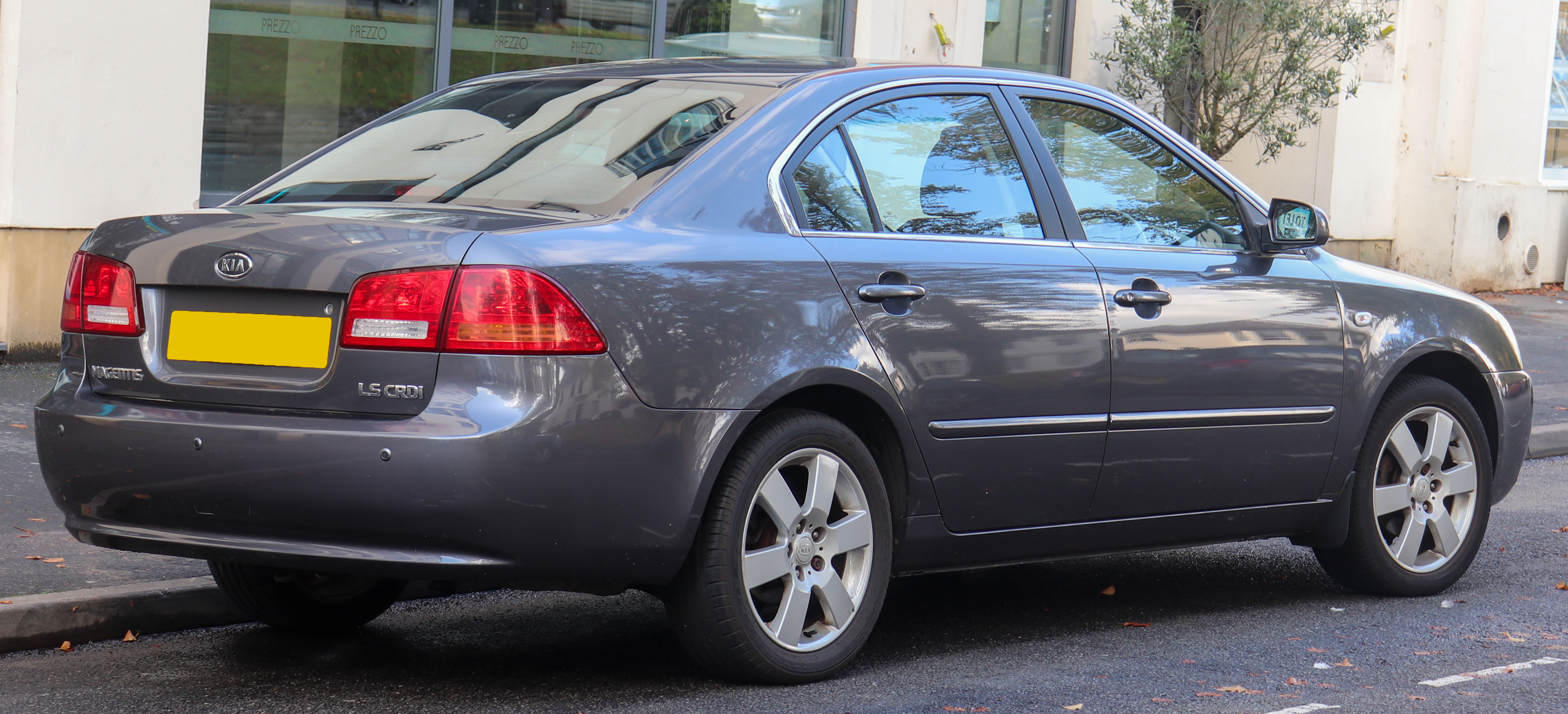
Kia Magentis LS (UK; pre-facelift)

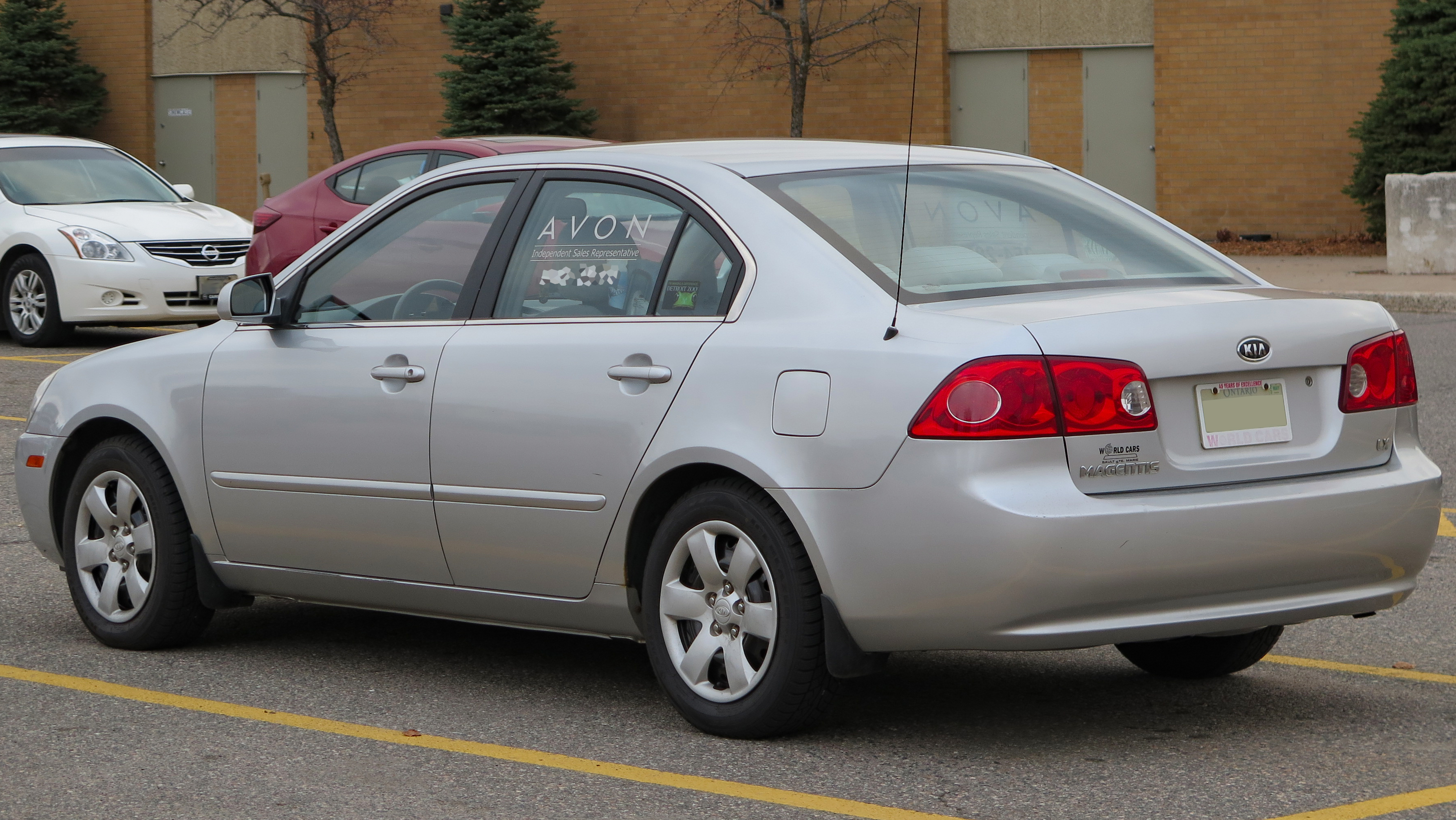
Kia Magentis LX (Canada; pre-facelift)

The second generation Optima, known as the Kia Magentis globally except in United States and Malaysia, and as the Kia Lotze in South Korea, was launched in South Korea in November 2005. This generation differed further from the Hyundai Sonata donor vehicle than the previous model. Unlike the previous Optima though, this vehicle uses a global platform, unique to Kia, designated "MG". The car continues to be built in South Korea and shares its 2.4-liter inline-four engine, five-speed Sportmatic automatic or five-speed manual transmission with the Sonata.

In addition to the 2.4-liter inline-four and the 2.7-liter V6 offered in North America, globally the Optima/Magentis/Lotze was also available with smaller, 1.8- or 2.0-liter fours, as well as a 2.0-liter turbodiesel engine. South Korean buyers also received and LPG-powered version of the 2.4. The second generation Optima was launched in Malaysia on 15 August 2007 powered by a 2.0-liter Theta DOHC CVVT engine with a 4-speed automatic transmission.

=== Safety ===
The Optima received a crash test rating of five stars from the NHTSA, and four stars from Euro NCAP. The 2006 Optima received Marginal to Good ratings from the Insurance Institute for Highway Safety (IIHS).

Test	Rating
Overall:	3/5 stars
Moderate overlap front:	Good
Side:	Average
Roof strength:	Marginal
Head restraints & seats:	Good

ANCAP test results Kia Magentis (2007)
Test	Score
Overall	4 /5 stars
Frontal offset	9.99/16
Side impact	14.33/16
Pole	2/2
Seat belt reminders	2/3
Whiplash protection	Not Assessed
Pedestrian protection	Poor
Electronic stability control	Standard

=== Update ===
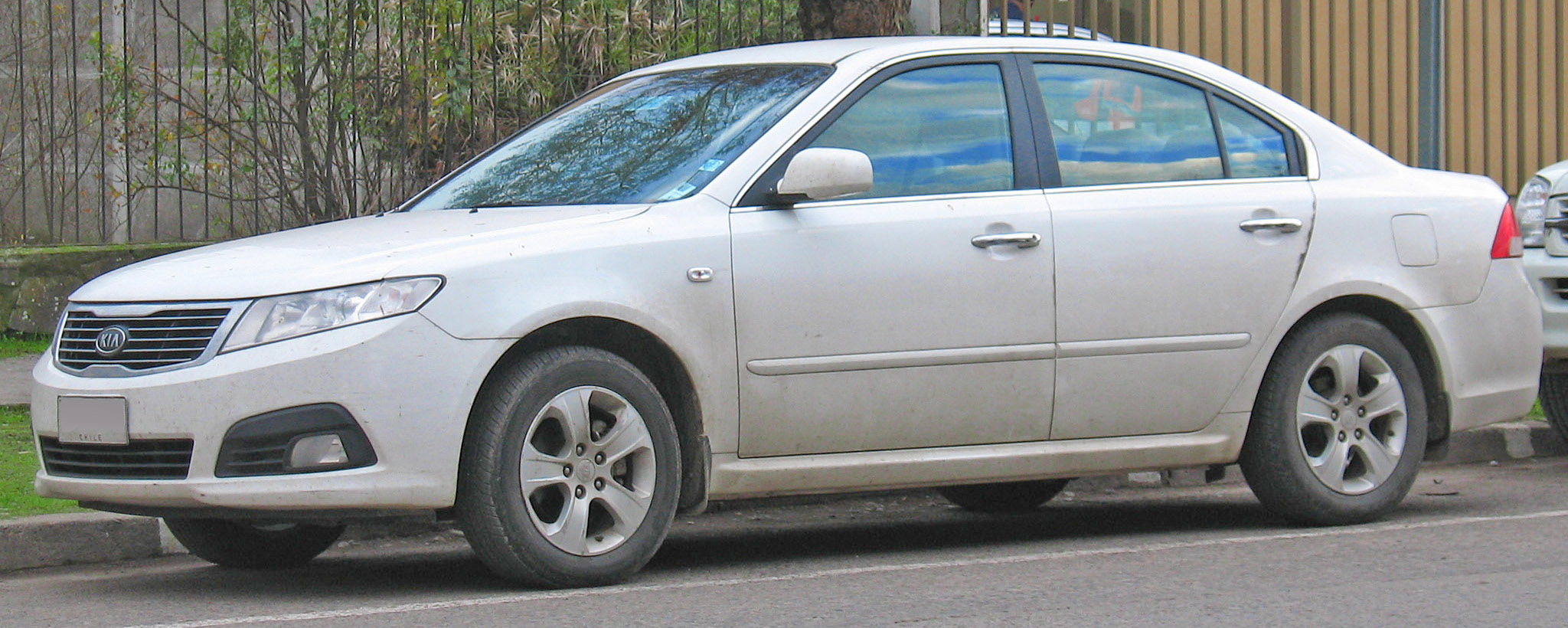
Kia Magentis EX (Chile; facelift)

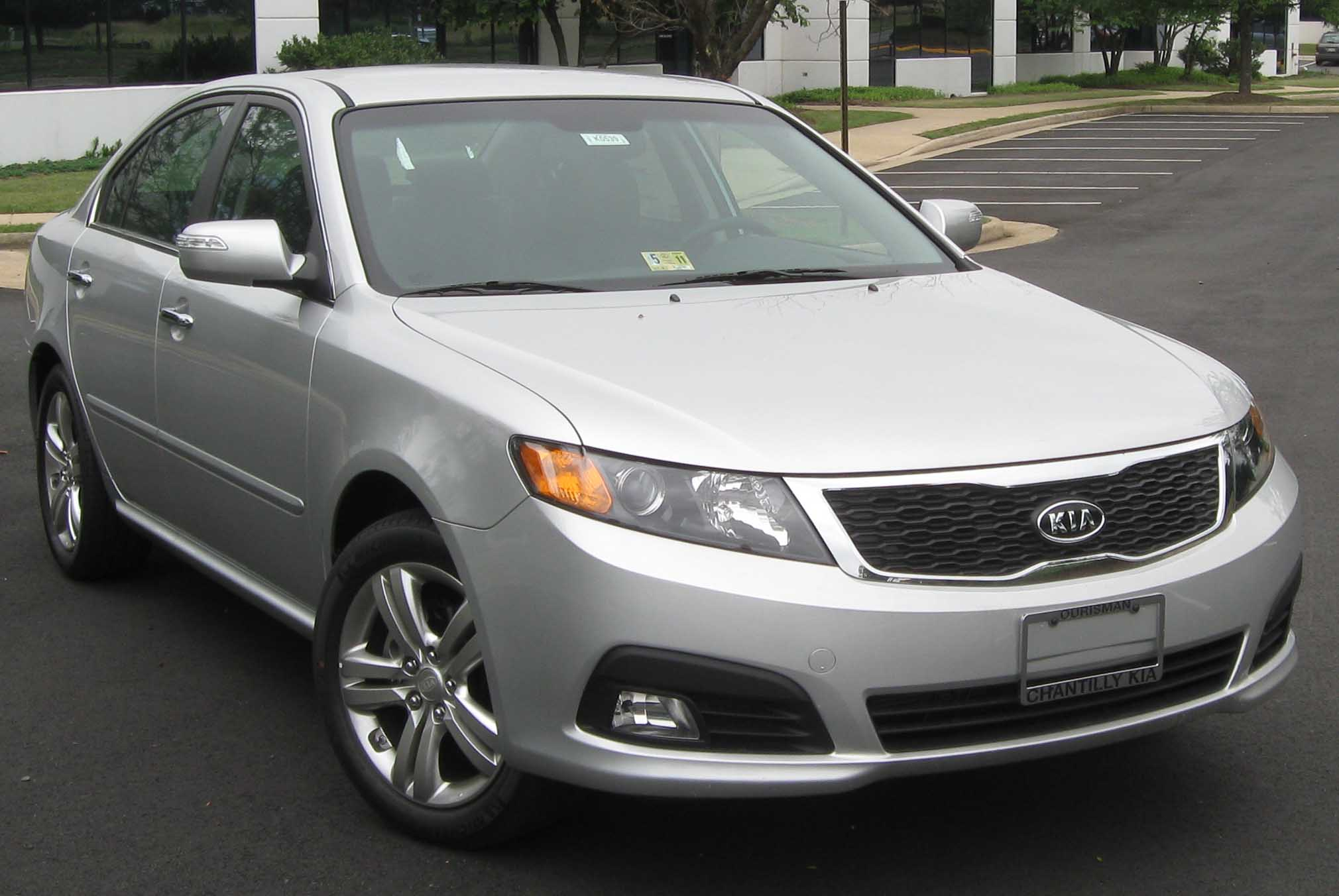
Kia Optima SX (US; facelift)

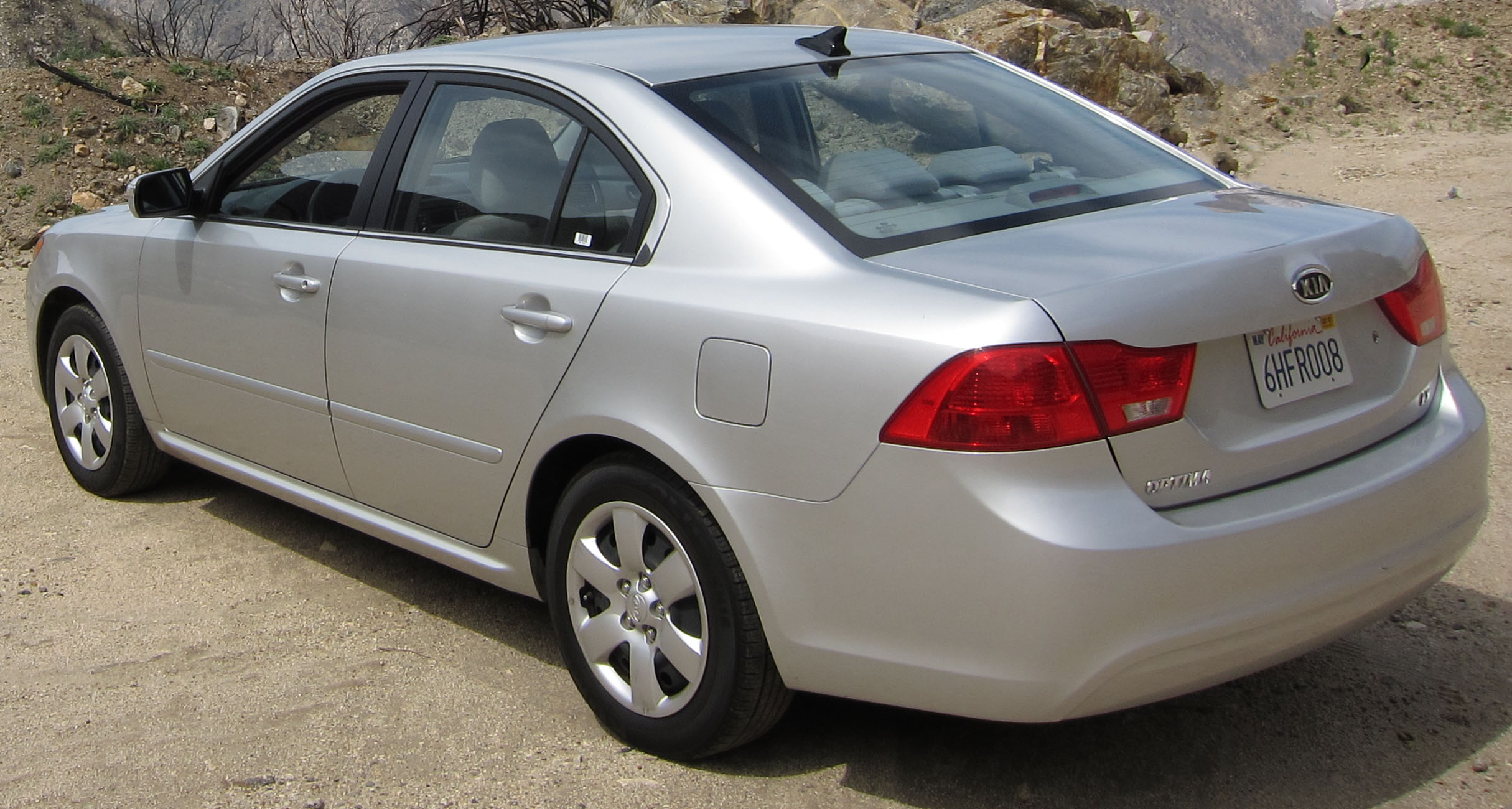
Kia Optima LX (US; facelift)

The Optima was revised and updated in 2008, debuting at the New York International Auto Show (as a 2009 model year). This update features new front-end styling and tail lamps. In addition to the revised exterior, length is also slightly increased by roughly 70 millimetres (2.8 in) to approximately 4,800 mm (190 in) long. There is also a new engine and the interior has also been revised. Main changes in the interior are a redesigned instrument cluster and a Sirius Satellite Radio/AM/FM/MP3/CD with an auxiliary jack. In certain markets, the option of satellite navigation is offered.

The new Theta II 2.4-liter I4 employs dual continuously variable valve timing (CVVT) and a variable intake system (VIS) to increase power to 131 kW (176 hp), while returning improved fuel consumption over its predecessor. Torque is rated at 229 N⋅m (169 lbf⋅ft). There is a 2.0L I4 for other markets with either a 5-speed manual or 4-speed automatic transmission. Power is rated at 164 hp (122 kW) at 6200 RPM and 197 N⋅m (145 lb⋅ft) of torque. Acceleration for the 2.0L is 0–100 km/h (0–62 mph) in 9.2 seconds for the 5-speed manual and 10.1 seconds for the 4-speed automatic. Top speed rated up to 208 km/h (129 mph) outside of the US. The 2.7-liter V6 offers few changes to the previous model, though power is increased to 144 kW (193 hp), and torque to 249 N⋅m (184 lbf⋅ft). Acceleration for the 5-speed automatic takes it from 0–60 mph (0–97 km/h) in 8.9sec with a top speed up to 220 km/h (137 mph). A five-speed manual transmission is standard in the base model, and a five-speed automatic is included with mid- and high-end levels (or as an option in the base model).

2010 models see the addition of a Proximity Key with Push-Button Start and paddle shifters on SX models.

In Australia, the Magentis was introduced in August 2006, and replaced the Optima. Initially available with a choice of 2.4 L 4-cylinder or 2.7 L V6 engines, the Magentis' sales never caught on, with sales peaking at only 741 units in 2007. In 2008, the V6 engine was dropped, as was the EX-L model, leaving only the entry-level 2.4 L EX on sale until its discontinuation in 2009. While the facelifted 2010 model was never officially launched, a very small number were imported for "evaluation" purposes, and eventually sold to the public as demos.

==== U.S. engines ====
Type	Model Years	Power/rpm	Torque/rpm
2,359 cc (144.0 cu in) 2.4 L Theta I4	2006.5–2008	162 bhp (121 kW; 164 PS) at 5800	164 lb⋅ft (222 N⋅m) at 4000
2,359 cc (144.0 cu in) 2.4 L Theta II I4	2009–2010	175 bhp (130 kW; 177 PS) at 6000	169 lb⋅ft (229 N⋅m) at 4000
2,656 cc (162.1 cu in) 2.7 L Delta V6	2006	170 bhp (127 kW; 172 PS) at 6000	181 lb⋅ft (245 N⋅m) at 4000
2,656 cc (162.1 cu in) 2.7 L Mu V6	2006.5–2008	185 bhp (138 kW; 188 PS) at 6000	182 lb⋅ft (247 N⋅m) at 4000
2,656 cc (162.1 cu in) 2.7 L Mu V6	2009–2010	194 bhp (145 kW; 197 PS) at 6000	184 lb⋅ft (249 N⋅m) at 4500

== Third generation (TF; 2010) ==
Third generation
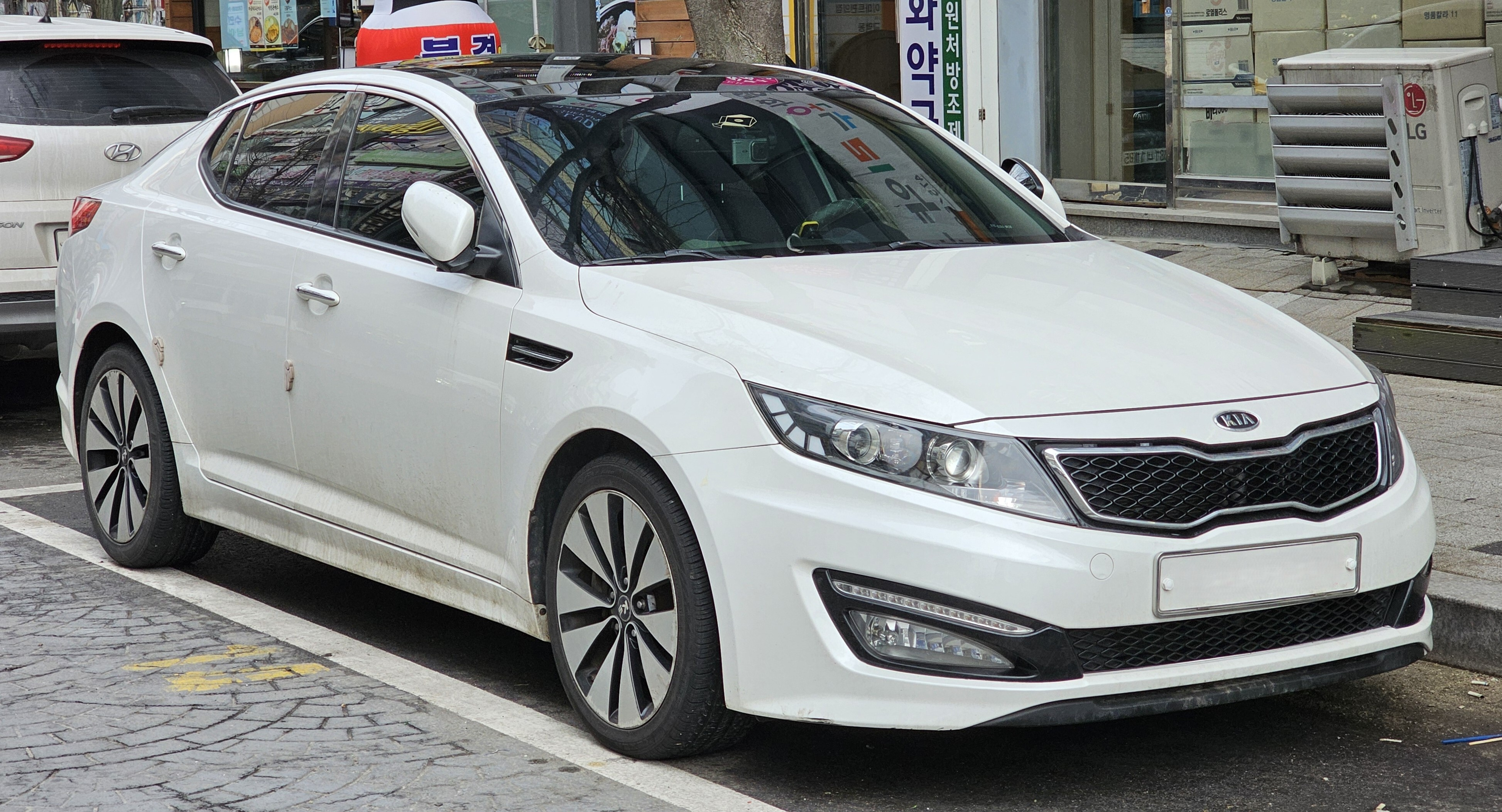

Overview
- Model code: TF
- Also called: Kia Optima
- Production: 2010–2015
- Model years: 2011–2015 (North America)
- Assembly: South Korea: Hwaseong (Hwaseong Plant); China: Yancheng (Yancheng Plant; Kazakhstan: Oskemen (Azia Avto); Iraq: Babylon Governorate (Babylon Automobile Plant); Russia: Kaliningrad (Avtotor); United States: West Point, GA (KMMG)
- Designer: Peter Schreyer; Miklós Kovács; Davide Limongelli

Body and chassis
- Body style: 4-door sedan
- Related: Hyundai Sonata (YF)

Powertrain
- Engine: Gasoline: 2.0 L Nu MPI I4; 2.0 L Theta II MPI I4; 2.0 L Theta II T-GDI I4; 2.4 L Theta II MPI I4; 2.4 L Theta II GDI I4; Gasoline/LPG: 2.0 L Nu LPI I4; 2.0 L Theta LPI I4; Diesel: 1.7 L U II CRDi I4
- Transmission: 6-speed manual; 6-speed automatic

Dimensions
- Wheelbase: 2,795 mm (110.0 in)
- Length: 4,845 mm (190.7 in)
- Width: 1,835 mm (72.2 in)
- Height: 1,455 mm (57.3 in)
- Curb weight: 1,391–1,470 kg (3,067–3,241 lb) (2.0L/2.4L); 1,520–1,535 kg (3,351–3,384 lb) (2.0L Turbo); 1,570–1,583 kg (3,461–3,490 lb) (Hybrid)

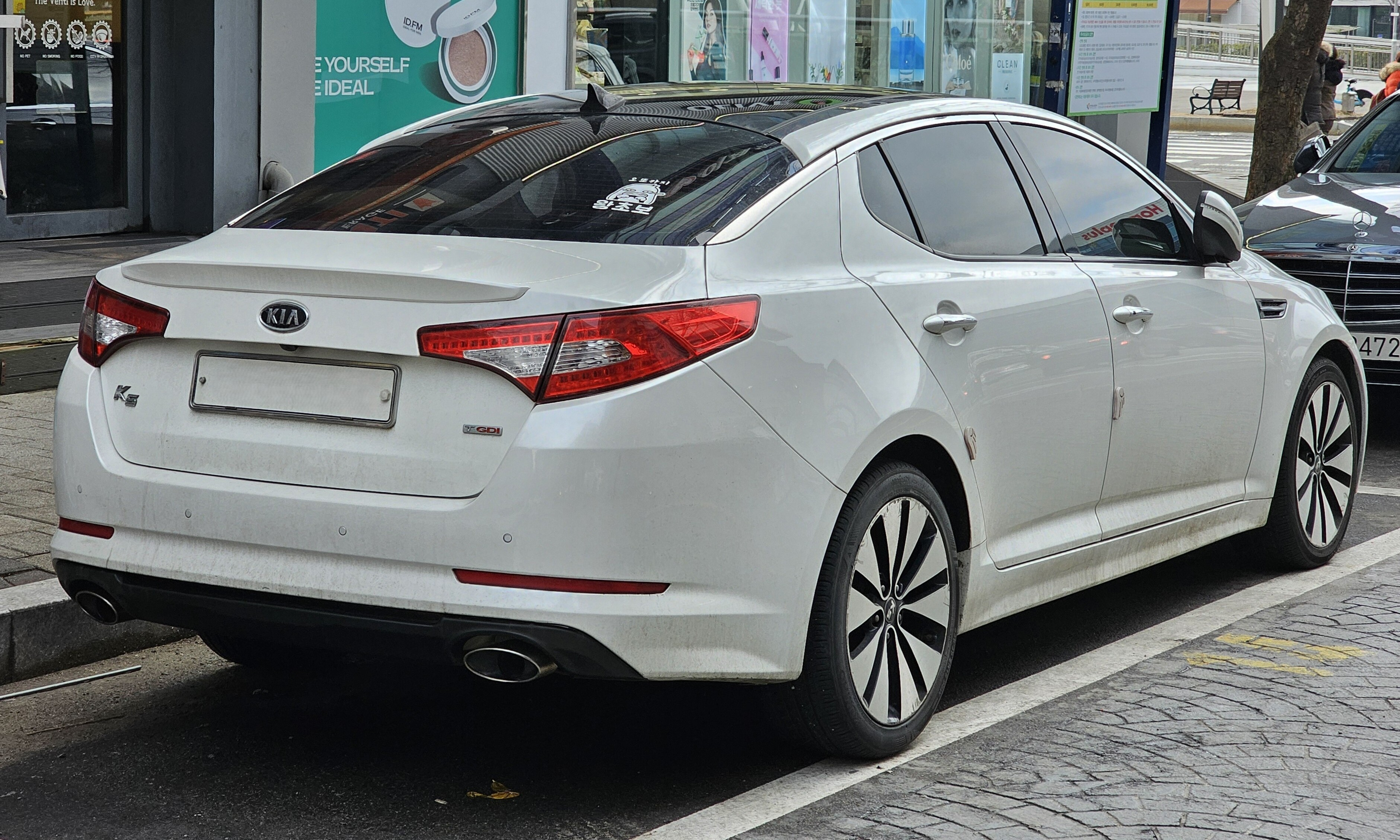
Kia K5 (South Korea; pre-facelift)

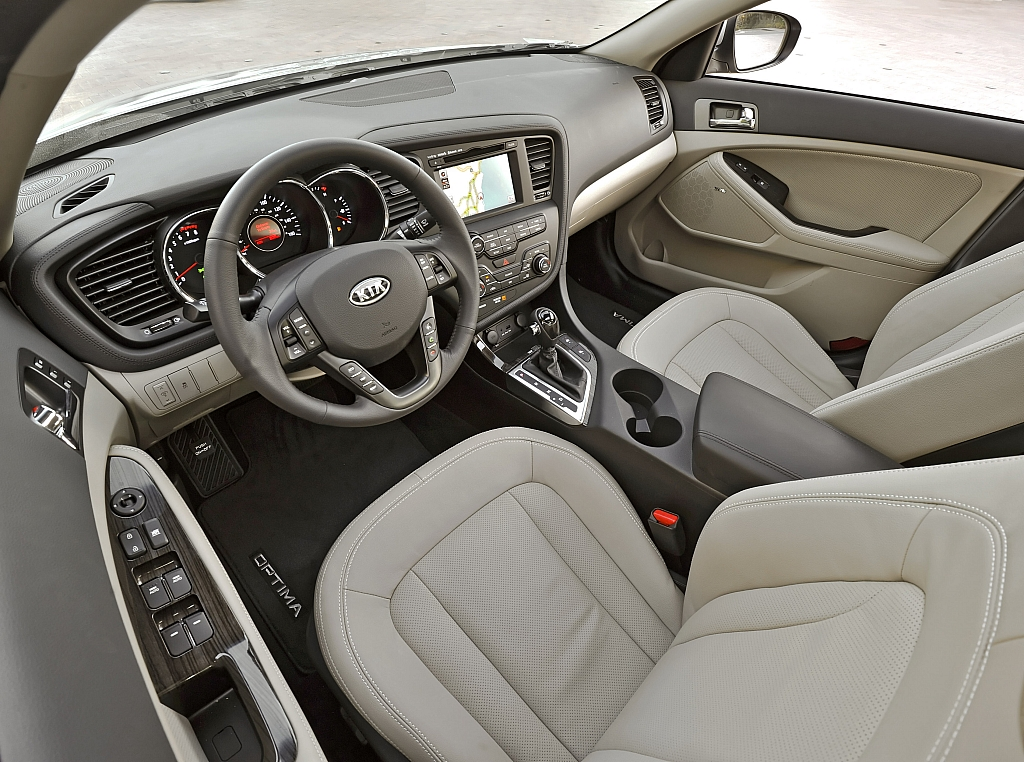
Interior

The completely redesigned Optima, sharing the same platform as its sibling Hyundai i40, marked the introduction of the Kia K5 name - in the South Korean and Chinese markets only, for this generation. It made its world debut at the 2010 New York International Auto Show. It features a new profile designed by Kia design chief Peter Schreyer, following the new design language featured on the Kia Forte, Kia Sorento, and Kia Sportage and Kia Cadenza — and using Kia's new corporate grille, known as the Tiger Nose, also designed by Schreyer. Lead designer of the TF in the team of Peter Schreyer and Miklos Kovacs was the Italian Davide Limongelli. For the first time, this model will be using the Optima name worldwide, where the Magentis name had been used previously.

As with its Hyundai Sonata sibling, the Optima's lineup has been replaced with a GDI 2.4-liter four-cylinder engine, either mated to a 6-speed automatic transmission with Eco dash display, or to a 6-speed manual transmission that is standard on only the LX model. Sales began in fall 2010. The new K5 was released in the South Korean market on 29 April 2010.

The new Optima retains its trim lines of the base LX, upscale EX, and sporty SX models. Standard equipment includes safety features such as electronic stability control (ESC) and ABS brakes, as well as Sirius Satellite Radio, cooled glove box, iPod connectivity, and handsfree Bluetooth phone operation. Starting in October 2013, on LX models, Kia will offer the UVO infotainment system by Microsoft as part of the convenience package. EX model options include Kia's new UVO infotainment system by Microsoft, integrated backup camera, and Proximity Key with Push-Button Start. A panoramic moonroof, heated and cooled front seats, heated rear seats and a navigation system are also available. SX models add a rear spoiler, metal pedals, black hybrid metal and carbon insert trim, paddle shifters, and illuminated scuff plates. The third generation Optima came with two different ignition options. On some, the ignition is fitted to the steering column with a turn key. In certain specifications, the keyhole is inside of the glove box, with a start button located on the dashboard.

Kia Optima assembly in Iraq In 2015, the Babylon Automobile Plant, located in Babylon Governorate, Iraq, began assembling the Kia Optima from complete knock-down (CKD) kits. The operation was part of a partnership between Iraqi state-owned enterprises and Kia’s regional distributors. Imported body shells, engines, transmissions, and other components were assembled locally on production lines that included chassis fitting, engine installation, interior trim, and quality-control testing. The plant’s reported capacity ranged from 24 to 44 vehicles per day, depending on model mix and demand. While most major components were imported, the facility aimed to increase local content over time, supporting Iraq’s efforts to revive its automotive assembly industry.

A Hybrid model and a Turbo model were also released. In addition, a wagon version was planned for European markets, and two-door coupé version was mooted for the United States. however they were never released. The turbo model has the same powertrain as the Hyundai Sonata 2.0T. The turbocharged model has 274 hp (204 kW) and 269 lb⋅ft (365 N⋅m) of torque in the North American model. The car is estimated to obtain 34 mpg_{‑US} (6.9 L/100 km; 41 mpg_{‑imp}) on the highway.

The third generation Kia Optima is built and manufactured in West Point, Georgia, which began in 2011 with the 2012 model.

In Australia, the new Optima went on sale in January 2011. Initially available in only one grade, the highly specified "Platinum", it was later joined by an entry-level "Si" model in the 2012 model year. Both models feature a 2.4L GDI engine with 6-speed automatic. A manual was not offered.

The facelifted 2014 model was unveiled at the 2013 New York International Auto Show in March.

The third generation Kia Optima was launched in Malaysia on 27 December 2011 powered by a 2.0 liter Theta II MPI engine with a 6-speed automatic transmission and in January 2014 the facelift version was launched in Malaysia.

=== Safety ===
The 2011 Optima received a "Top Safety Pick" rating from the Insurance Institute for Highway Safety (IIHS).

Test	Rating
Overall:	5/5 stars
Small overlap front:	Average
Moderate overlap front:	Good
Side:	Good
Roof strength:	Good
Head restraints & seats:	Good

ANCAP test results Kia Optima all variants (2011)
Test	Score
Overall	5 /5 stars
Frontal offset	14.58/16
Side impact	16/16
Pole	2/2
Seat belt reminders	3/3
Whiplash protection	Not Assessed
Pedestrian protection	Not Assessed
Electronic stability control	Standard

=== Reception ===
In a March 2012 comparison test by Car and Driver, the Optima came in third place out of six cars behind the first place Volkswagen Passat and the second place Honda Accord.

=== Powertrain ===
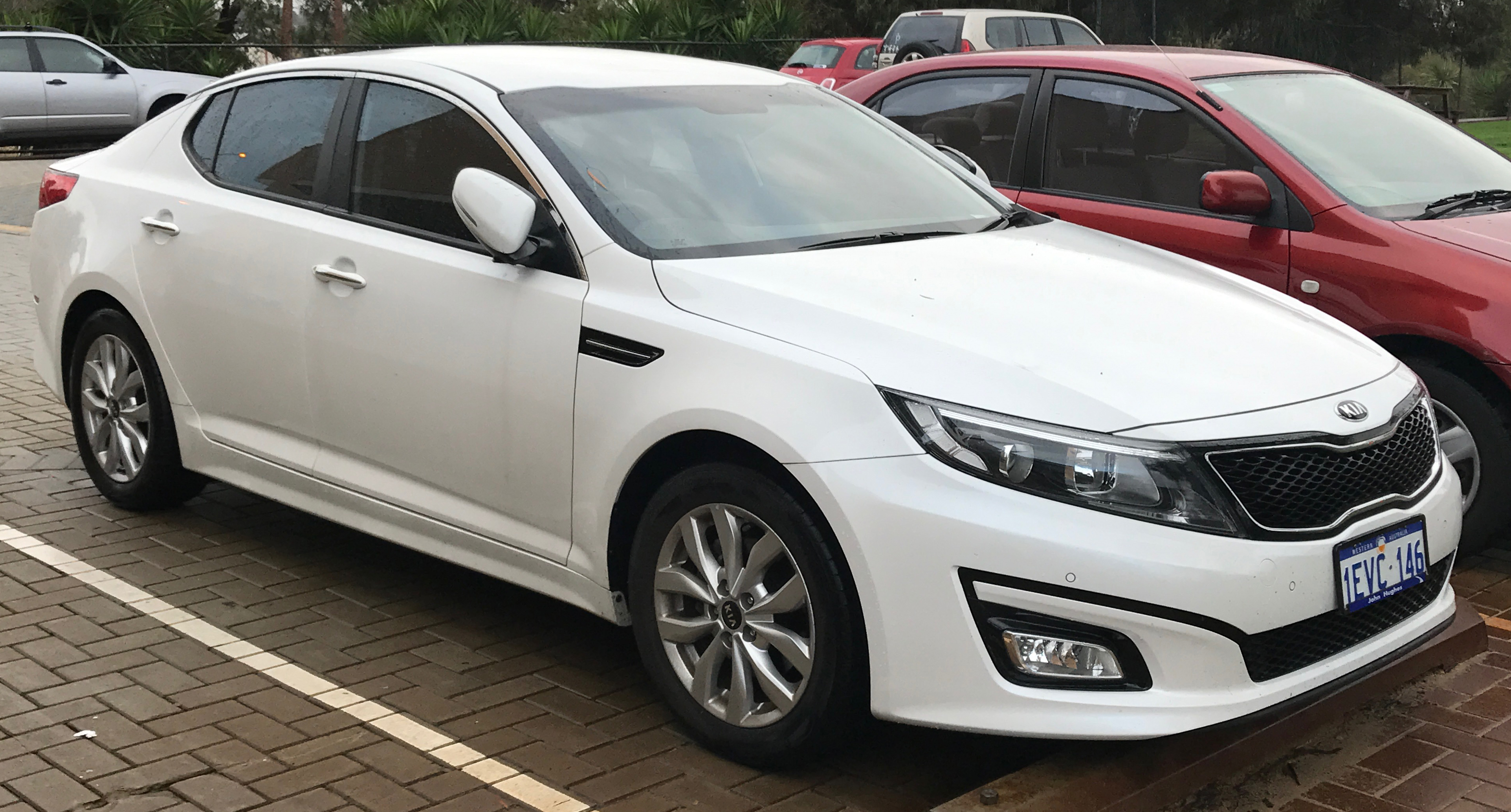

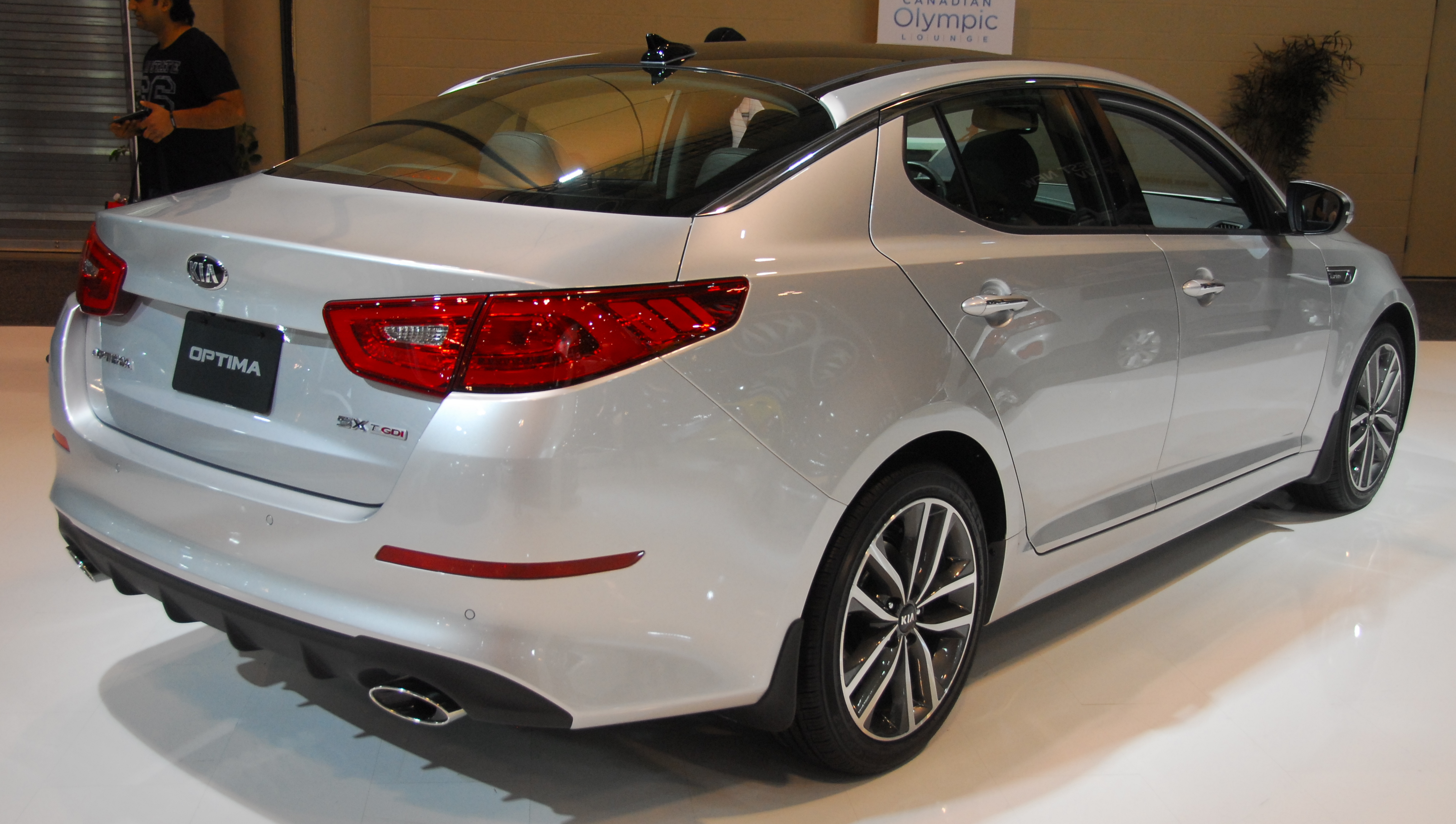
2014 facelift

Model	Years	Transmission	Power	Torque	0–100 km/h (0–62 mph) (Official)	Top Speed
Gasoline
2.0L Nu MPi	2013–2015	6-speed manual 6-speed automatic	121 kW (165 PS; 163 hp) at 6500 rpm 127 kW (172 PS; 170 hp) at 6700 rpm	196 N⋅m (145 lb⋅ft) at 4800 rpm 201 N⋅m (148 lb⋅ft) at 4800 rpm	9.8s (Manual); 10.6s (Automatic)	210 km/h (130 mph) (Manual); 208 km/h (129 mph) (Automatic)
2.0L Nu MPi HEV	2011–2015	6–speed automatic	140 kW (190 PS; 187 hp) at 5500 rpm		9.4s	192 km/h (119 mph)
2.0L Theta II MPi	2010–2013	6-speed manual 6-speed automatic	121 kW (165 PS; 163 hp) at 6200 rpm	198 N⋅m (146 lb⋅ft) at 4600 rpm	9.8s (Manual); 10.9s (Automatic)	210 km/h (130 mph) (Manual); 202 km/h (126 mph) (Automatic)
2.0L Theta II GDi Turbo	2011–2015	6-speed automatic	204 kW (278 PS; 274 hp) at 6000 rpm	365 N⋅m (269 lb⋅ft) at 1750-4500 rpm	6.4s	
2.4L Theta II MPi	2010–2015	6-speed manual 6-speed automatic	132 kW (180 PS; 178 hp) at 6000 rpm	231 N⋅m (171 lb⋅ft) at 4000 rpm	9.1s (Manual); 9.5s (Automatic)	210 km/h (130 mph)
2.4L Theta II GDi	2010–2015	6-speed automatic	148 kW (201 PS; 198 hp) at 6300 rpm	250 N⋅m (184 lb⋅ft) at 4250 rpm	9.0s	210 km/h (130 mph)
LPG
2.0L Nu LPi	2011–2015	6-speed manual 6-speed automatic	115 kW (157 PS; 155 hp) at 6200 rpm	196 N⋅m (145 lb⋅ft) at 4200 rpm		
2.0L Theta II LPi	2010–2011	6-speed manual 6-speed automatic	106 kW (144 PS; 142 hp) at 6000 rpm	189 N⋅m (140 lb⋅ft) at 4250 rpm		
Diesel
1.7L U II CRDi	2010–2015	6-speed manual 6-speed automatic	100 kW (136 PS; 134 hp) at 4000 rpm	325 N⋅m (239 lb⋅ft) at 2000–2500 rpm	10.3s (Manual); 11.6s (Automatic)	202 km/h (126 mph) (Manual); 197 km/h (122 mph) (Automatic)

=== Hybrid version ===
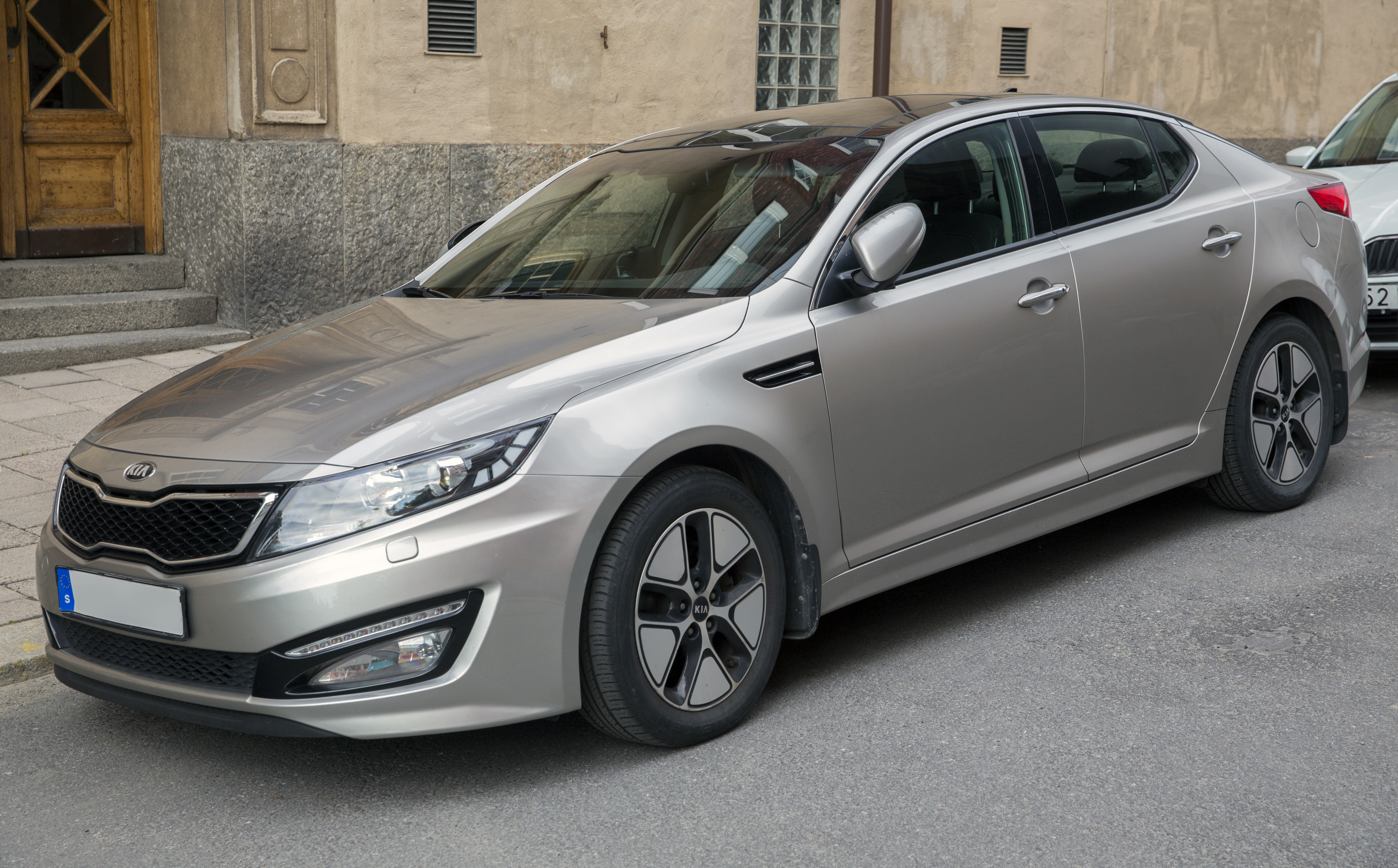
2013 Kia Optima Hybrid (pre-facelift)

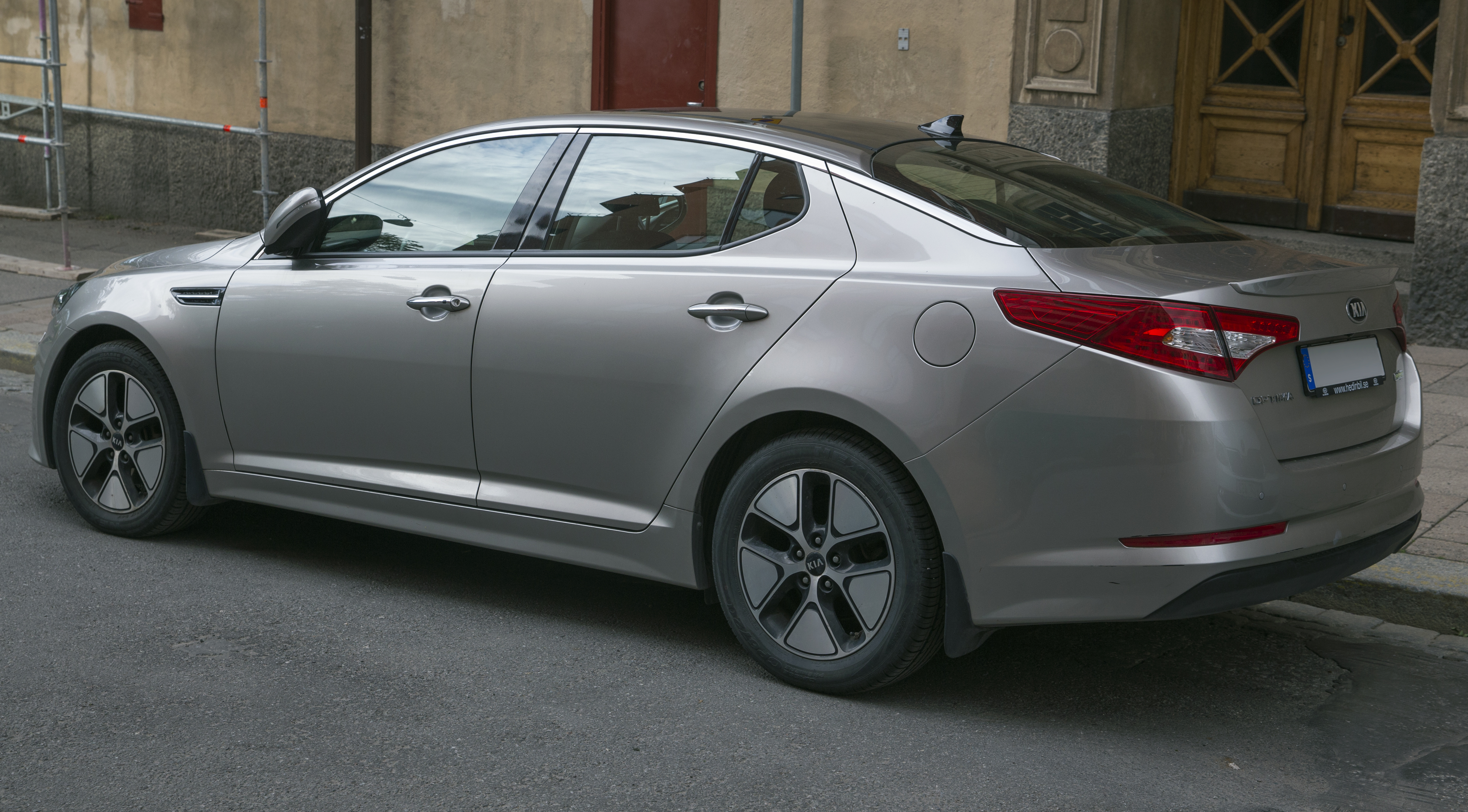
2013 Kia Optima Hybrid (pre-facelift)

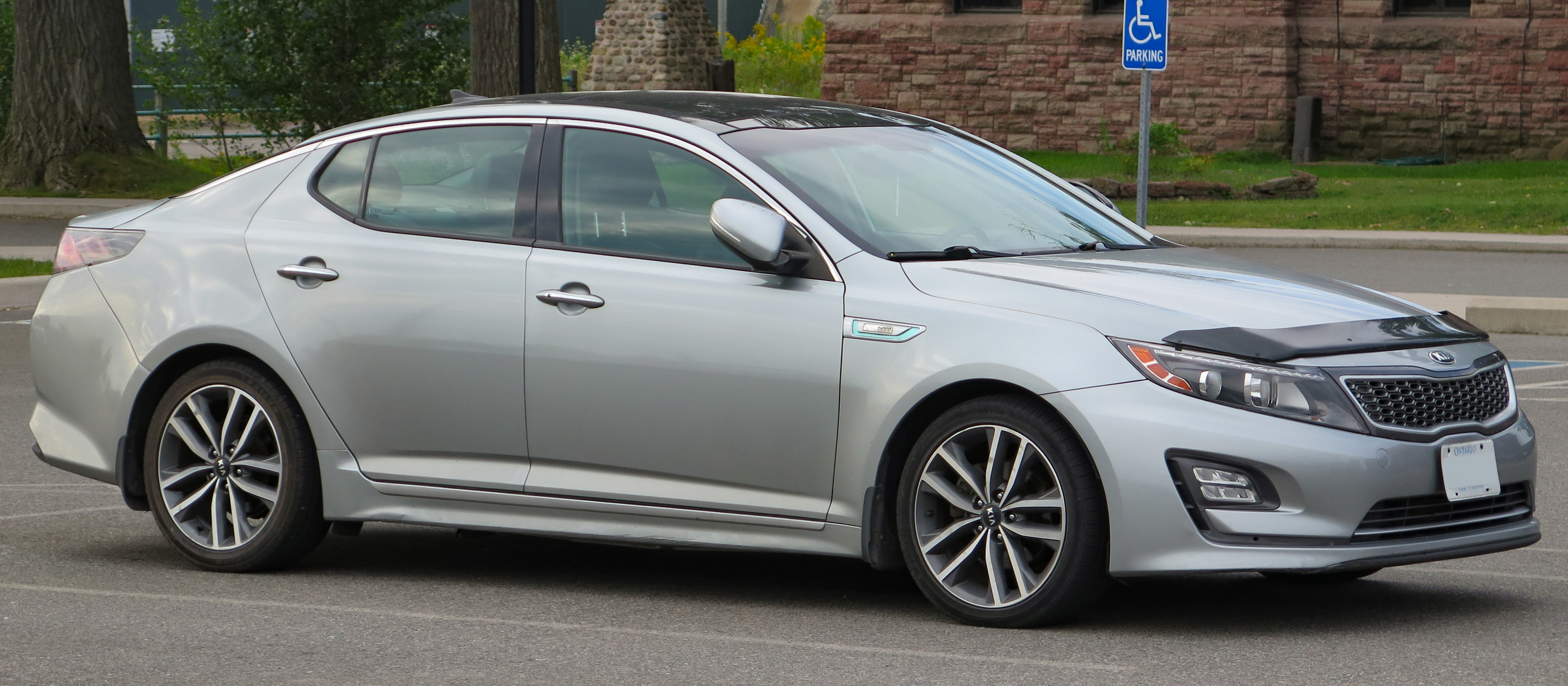
2014 Kia Optima Hybrid (facelift)

The 2011 Kia Optima Hybrid was unveiled at the 2010 Los Angeles Auto Show, and was launched in the U.S. market in June 2011. During its first month in the market sold 524 units. Considering cumulative sales in the U.S. market through December 2011, with 19,672 units sold, together the Hyundai Sonata Hybrid and the Kia Optima Hybrid ranked second in hybrid sales for calendar year 2011, after the Toyota Prius.

The Optima Hybrid uses the Hyundai Sonata Hybrid powertrain, combining a 2.4-liter MPI engine with a six-speed automatic transmission, and a 30kW electric motor and lightweight lithium polymer batteries to produce a full gasoline-electric hybrid with an estimated fuel consumption of 37 mpg_{‑US} (6.4 L/100 km; 44 mpg_{‑imp}) city and 39 mpg_{‑US} (6.0 L/100 km; 47 mpg_{‑imp}) highway. The Optima Hybrid is able to travel up to 100 km/h (62 mph) in full electric mode, which helps it stand apart from many competitors. Korean and European markets will get the Optima Hybrid with a 2.0-liter turbocharged engine.

The only externally apparent features that differentiate it from the Kia Optima are the hybrid badging, application specific wheel design, a lowered ride height by approximately 1 in (25 mm), and the availability of a special light platinum graphite paint color. It also utilizes an active shutter system behind the upper grille, allowing the car to redirect airflow when the gas engine's heat levels allow (such as when the car is operating in EV mode to improve aerodynamics, or to assist in more rapid warming up of the gas engine).

In September 2011, the Optima Hybrid set a Guinness World Record for "Lowest Fuel Consumption in a Hybrid Gasoline Vehicle" while driving across the continental United States for 14 days, starting from the Kia factory in West Point, Georgia. In its 7,899-mile drive across the 48 states, the car recorded an average of 64.55 miles per gallon while consuming a total of five and a half tanks of gasoline. In order to qualify for the record, the car had two people and luggage throughout the entire trip.

== Fourth generation (JF; 2015) ==
Fourth generation
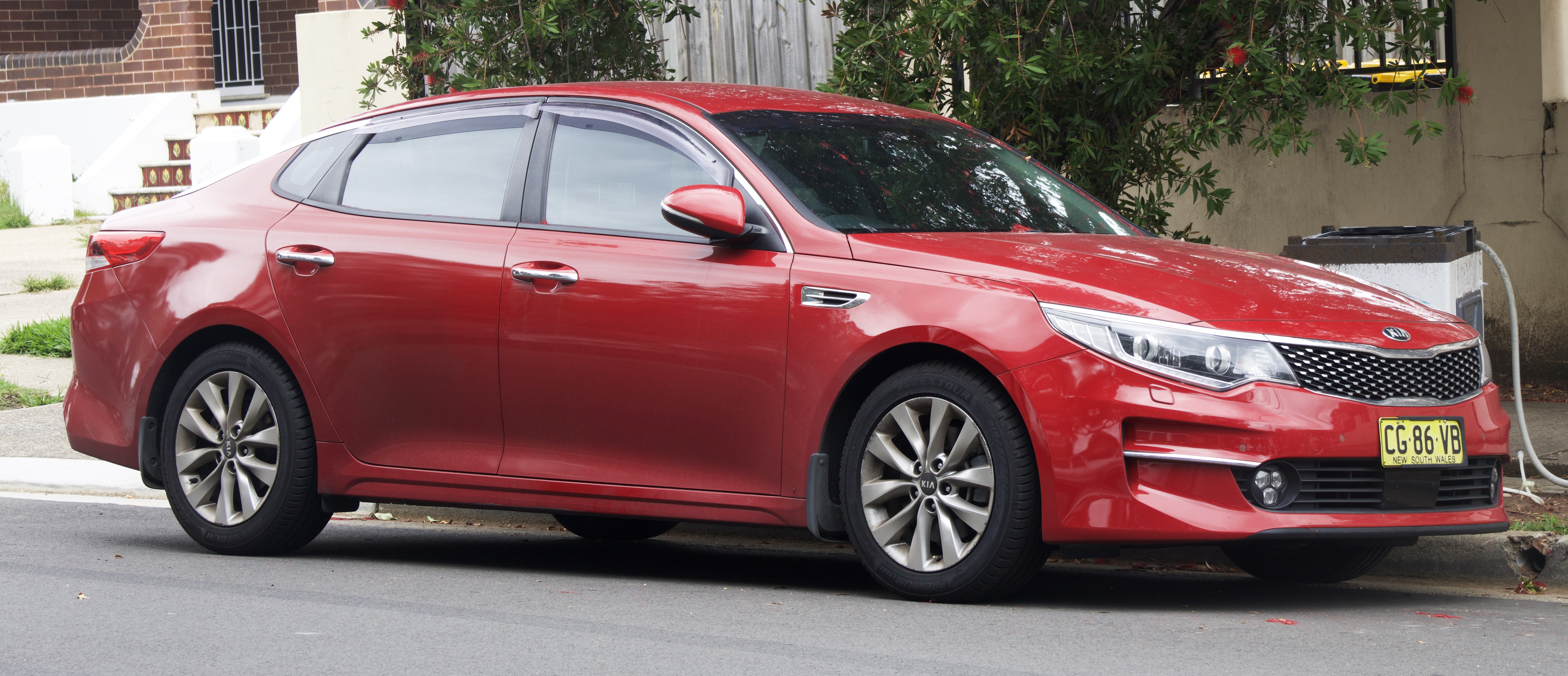

Overview
- Model code: JF
- Also called: Kia Optima
- Production: 2015–2020
- Model years: 2016–2020 (North America)
- Assembly: South Korea: Hwaseong (Hwaseong Plant); United States: West Point, Georgia (KMMG); China: Yancheng (DYK); Malaysia: Gurun, Kedah (Naza); Kazakhstan: Oskemen (Azia Avto); Russia: Kaliningrad (Avtotor); Algeria: Batna (GLOVIZ)
- Designer: Peter Schreyer

Body and chassis
- Body style: 4-door sedan; 5-door station wagon
- Related: Hyundai Sonata (LF)

Powertrain
- Engine: Gasoline: 1.6 L Gamma II T-GDi I4; 2.0 L Nu MPi I4; 2.0 L Theta II T-GDi I4; 2.4 L Theta II GDi I4; Gasoline hybrid: 2.0 L Nu GDi HEV I4; Gasoline/LPG: 2.0 L Nu LPi I4; Diesel: 1.6 L U II CRDi I4; 1.7 L U II CRDi I4
- Transmission: 6-speed manual; 6-speed automatic; 7-speed DCT

Dimensions
- Wheelbase: 2,805 mm (110.4 in)
- Length: 4,855 mm (191.1 in)
- Width: 1,860 mm (73.2 in)
- Height: 1,465 mm (57.7 in)
- Curb weight: 1,440–1,565 kg (3,175–3,450 lb) (Gasoline); 1,510–1,535 kg (3,329–3,384 lb) (Diesel); 1,580–1,600 kg (3,480–3,530 lb) (Hybrid)

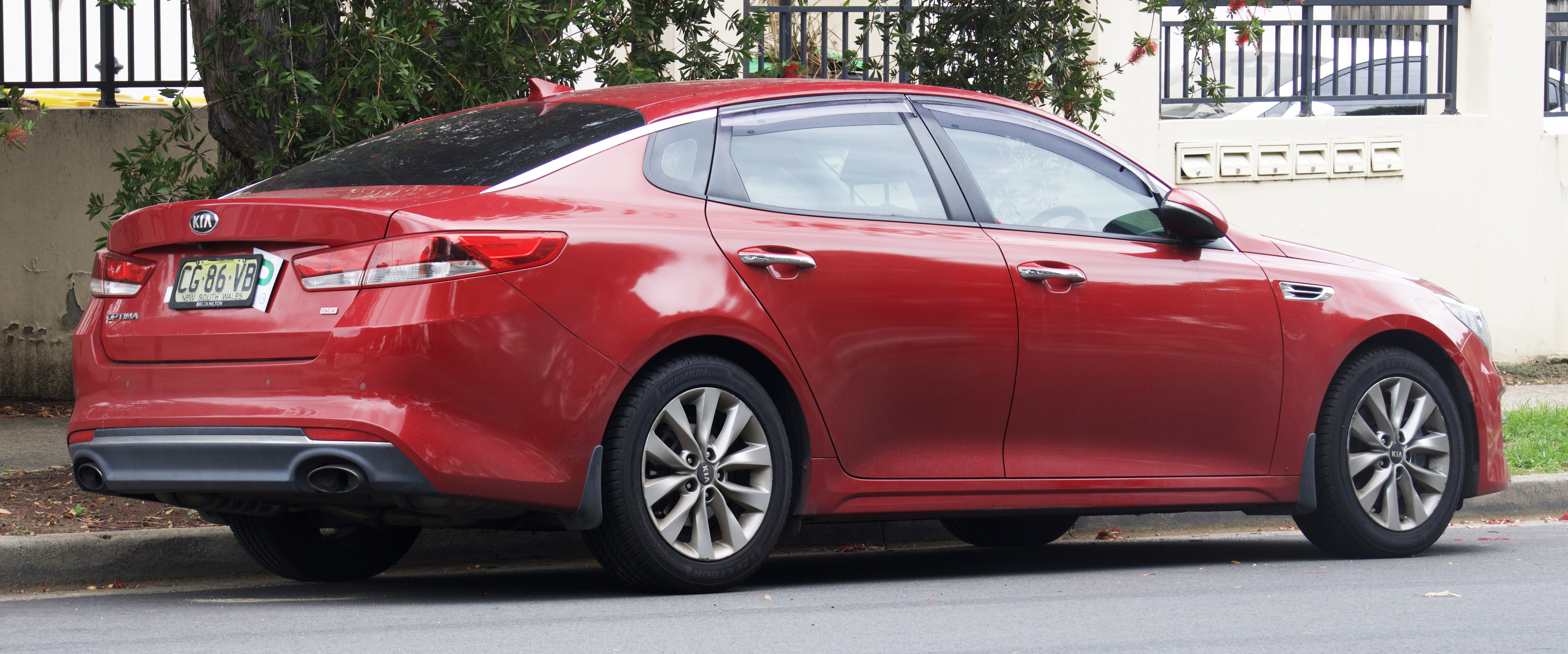
Sedan (pre-facelift)

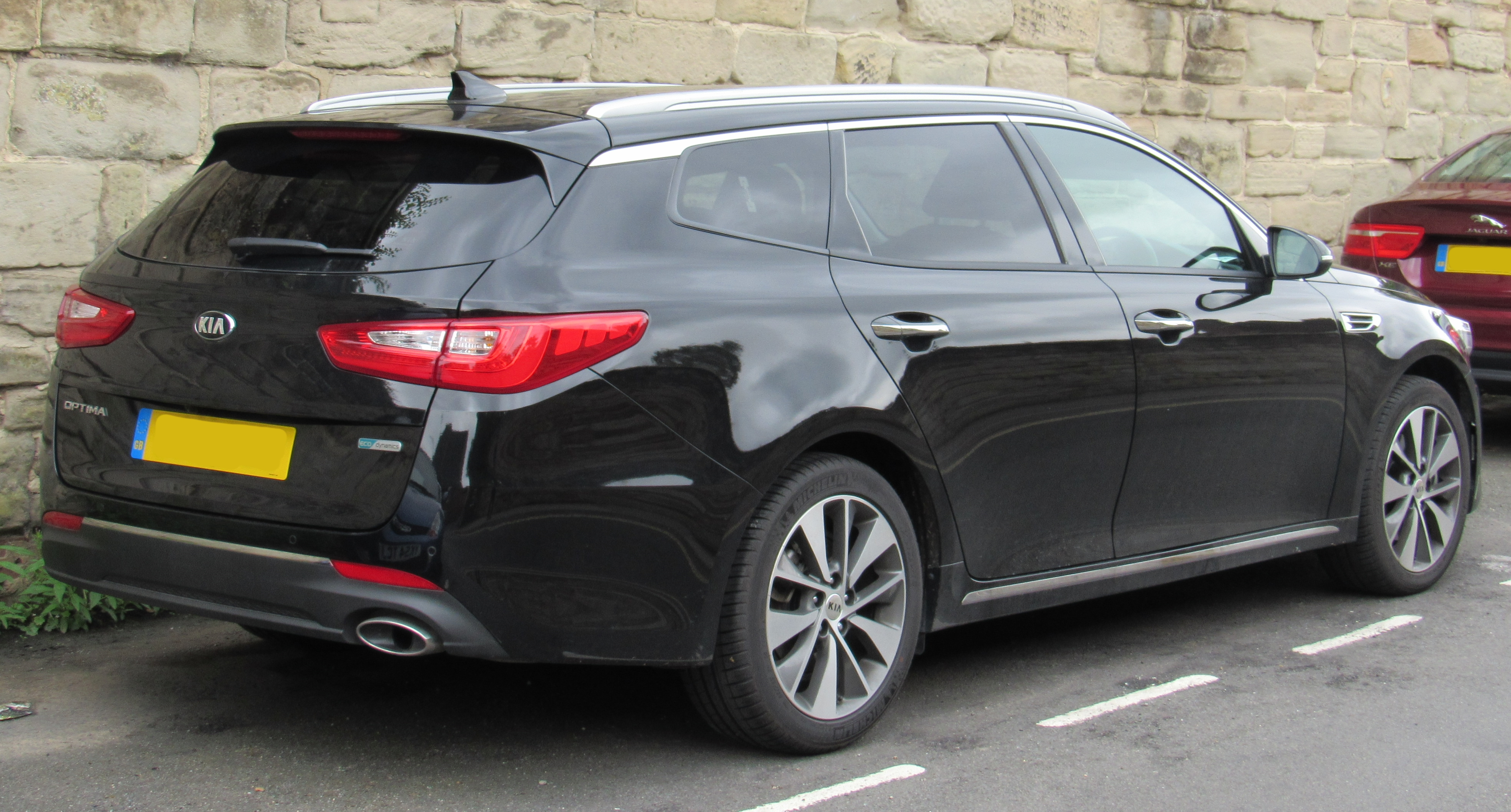
Sportswagon (pre-facelift)

The 2016 Kia Optima went on-sale towards the end of 2015. It shares a platform with the 2015 Hyundai Sonata, and offers a new design, with new features and enhancements. As with the previous-generation Optima, the new model was designed by Kia's Chief of Design, Peter Schreyer. Unveiled at the 10th Seoul Motor Show in April 2015, the new K5 was released in the South Korean market on 15 July 2015.

For the Malaysian market, the fourth generation Kia Optima was launched in May 2017 powered by the Theta II 2.0 liter turbocharged four-cylinder gasoline engine with a 6-speed automatic transmission.

=== Sportswagon ===
At the 2016 Geneva Motor Show, Kia revealed the Sportswagon variant of the Optima. Developed mainly for the European market by Kia's European design team, Kia says the model represents a significant growth opportunity in Europe, as two thirds of all models sold in the class are estates, rising to three quarters when looking purely at fleet sales. In its case, Kia says the estate could outsell the sedan version six to one.

=== Powertrain ===
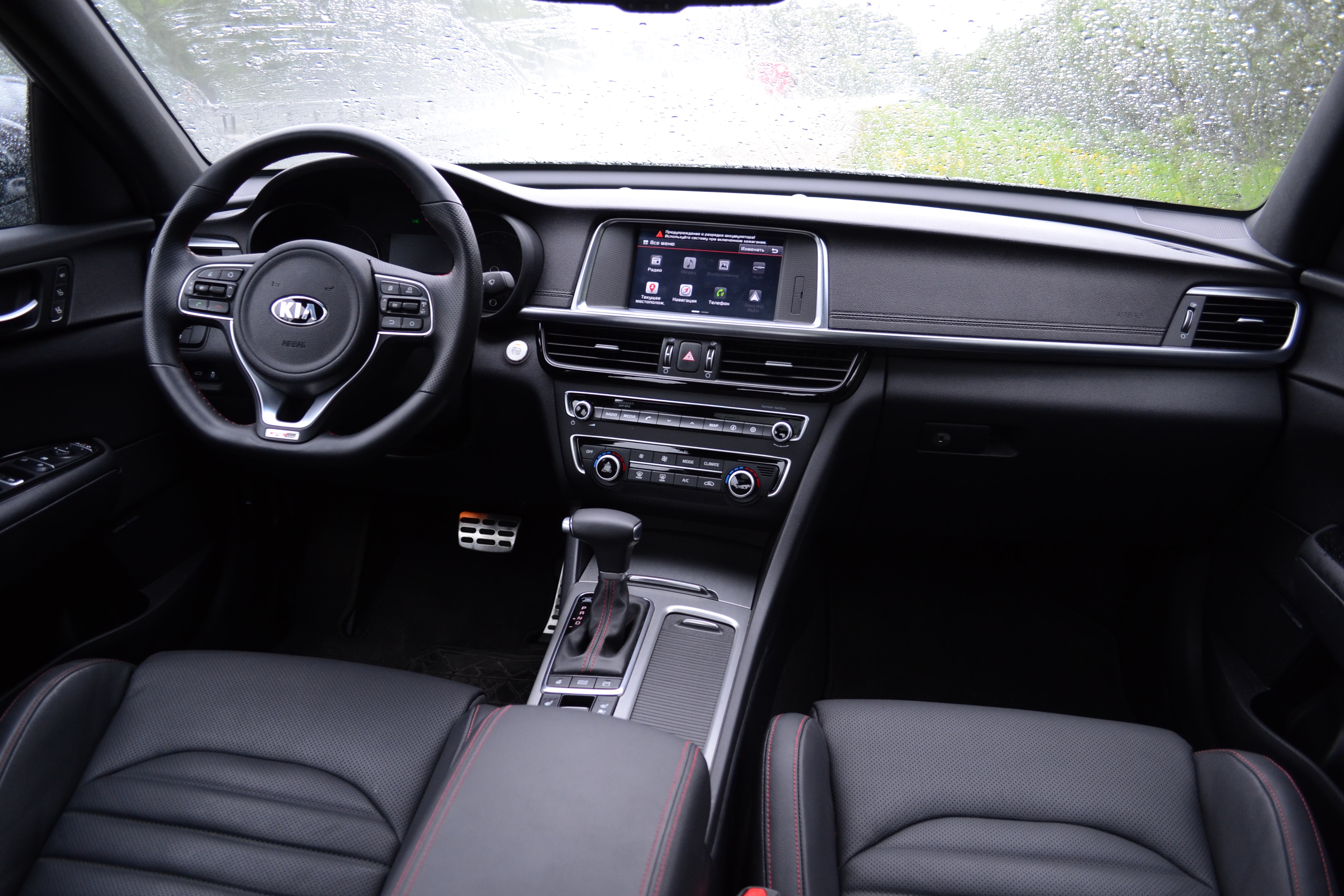
Kia Optima (JF) pre-facelift interior

Gasoline engines
Model	Years	Transmission	Power	Torque	0–100 km/h (0–62 mph) (Official)	Top Speed
1.6L Gamma II T-GDi	2015–2019	7–speed dual clutch	132 kW (180 PS; 178 hp) at 5500 rpm	265 N⋅m (195 lb⋅ft) at 1500–4500 rpm	8.9s	210 km/h (130 mph)
2.0L Nu GDi HEV	2015–2019	6–speed automatic	151 kW (205 PS; 202 hp) at 6000 rpm		9.4s	192 km/h (119 mph)
2.0L Nu MPi	2015–2019	6-speed manual 6-speed automatic	120 kW (163 PS; 161 hp) at 6500 rpm	196 N⋅m (145 lb⋅ft) at 4800 rpm	9.4s (Manual); 10.5s (Automatic)	210 km/h (130 mph) (Manual); 208 km/h (129 mph) (Automatic)
2.0L Theta II T-GDi	2015–2019	6-speed automatic	180 kW (245 PS; 242 hp) at 6000 rpm	353 N⋅m (260 lb⋅ft) at 1350-4000 rpm	7.6s	240 km/h (149 mph) (Sedan); 232 km/h (144 mph) (Wagon)
2.4L Theta II GDi	2015–2019	6-speed automatic	138 kW (188 PS; 185 hp) at 6000 rpm	241 N⋅m (178 lb⋅ft) at 4000 rpm	9.1s	210 km/h (130 mph)
2.0L Nu LPi	2015–2021	6-speed manual 6-speed automatic	113 kW (153 PS; 151 hp) at 6200 rpm 111 kW (151 PS; 149 hp) at 6200 rpm	196 N⋅m (145 lb⋅ft) at 4800 rpm 194 N⋅m (143 lb⋅ft) at 4800 rpm		
1.6L U II CRDi	2018–2019	6-speed manual 7-speed dual clutch	100 kW (136 PS; 134 hp) at 4000 rpm	320 N⋅m (236 lb⋅ft) at 2000–2250 rpm	11.2s (Manual); 11.8s (DCT)	196 km/h (122 mph) (Manual); 195 km/h (121 mph) (DCT)
1.7L U II CRDi	2015–2018	6-speed manual 7-speed dual clutch	104 kW (141 PS; 139 hp) at 4000 rpm	340 N⋅m (251 lb⋅ft) at 1750–2500 rpm	10.2s (Manual); 11.1s (DCT)	200 km/h (124 mph)

=== Plug-in hybrid ===
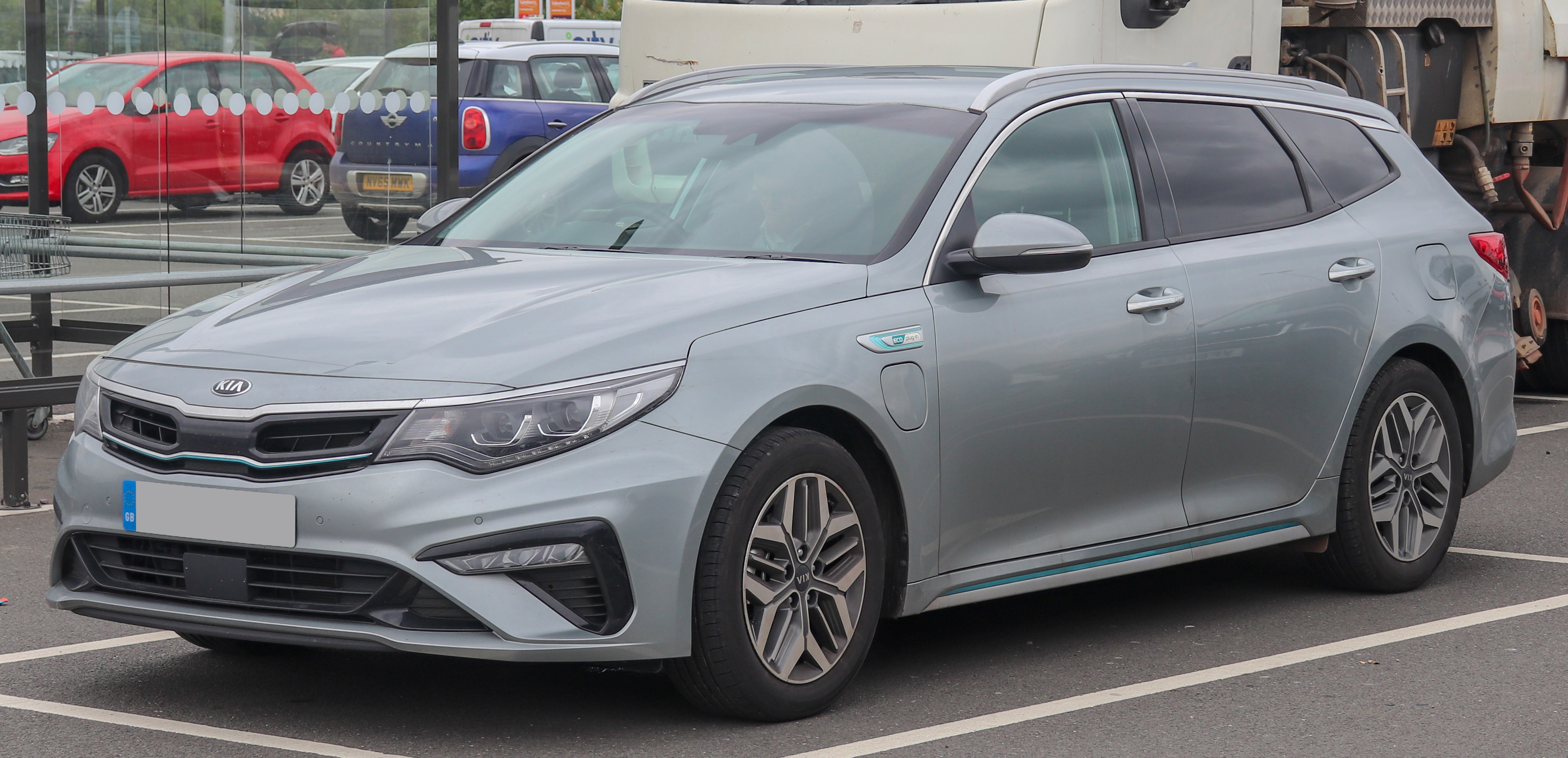
Kia Optima plug-in hybrid

A plug-in hybrid variant was unveiled at the 2016 Chicago Auto Show. The Kia Optima PHEV shares the powertrain of the Hyundai Sonata PHEV, and like its sibling, it has a 9.8 kWh battery pack that delivers an all-electric range of 27 mi (43 km), but the Optima plug-in hybrid has a lower drag coefficient, which at 0.24 Cd is on par with the all-electric Tesla Model S. The Optima PHEV has an active grille, which automatically opens and closes at high and low speeds, contributing to reduce the Cd. The plug-in hybrid features a 50 kW electric motor and 2.0-liter "Nu" four-cylinder GDI engine, mated to a six-speed automatic transmission.

Retail deliveries began in the United States in January 2017 with 40 units sold.

=== Facelift (2018) ===
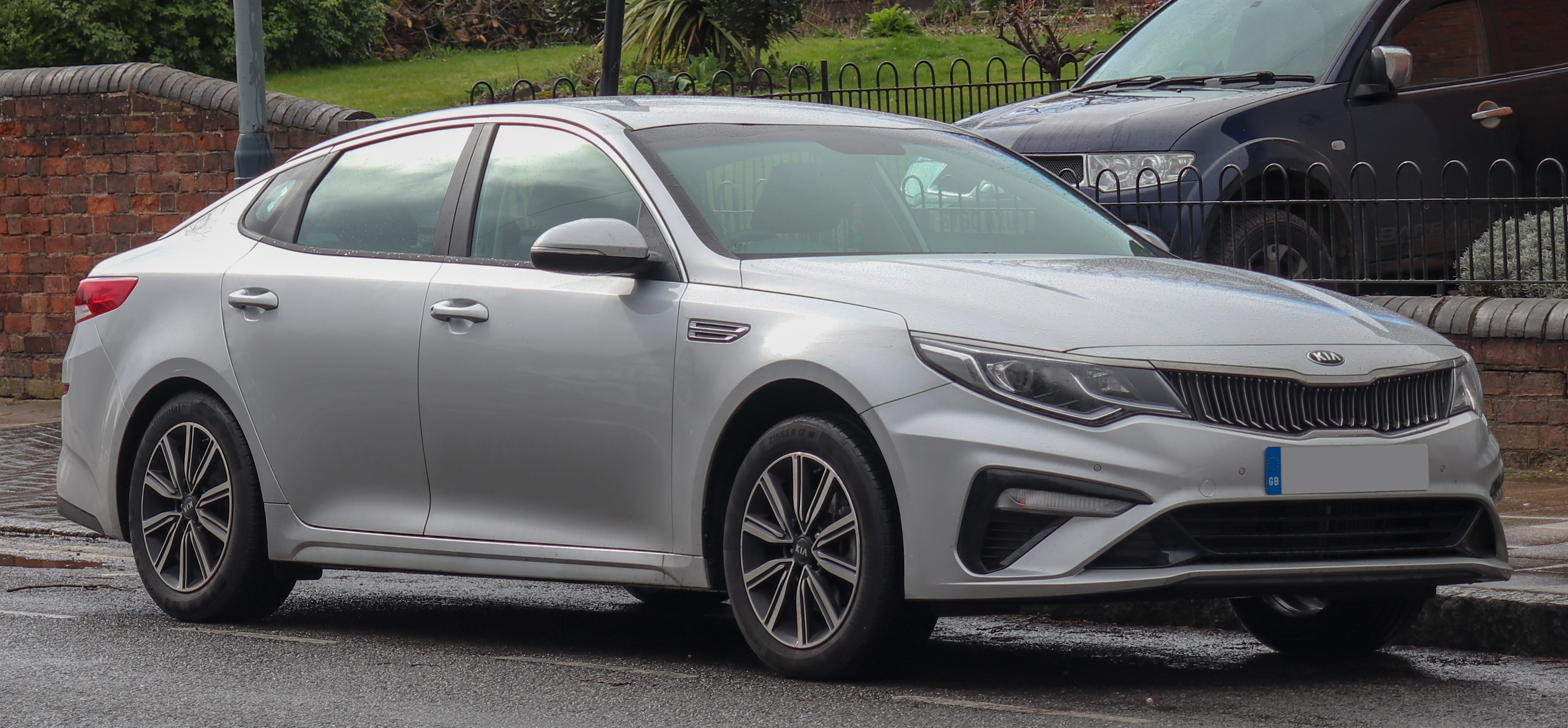

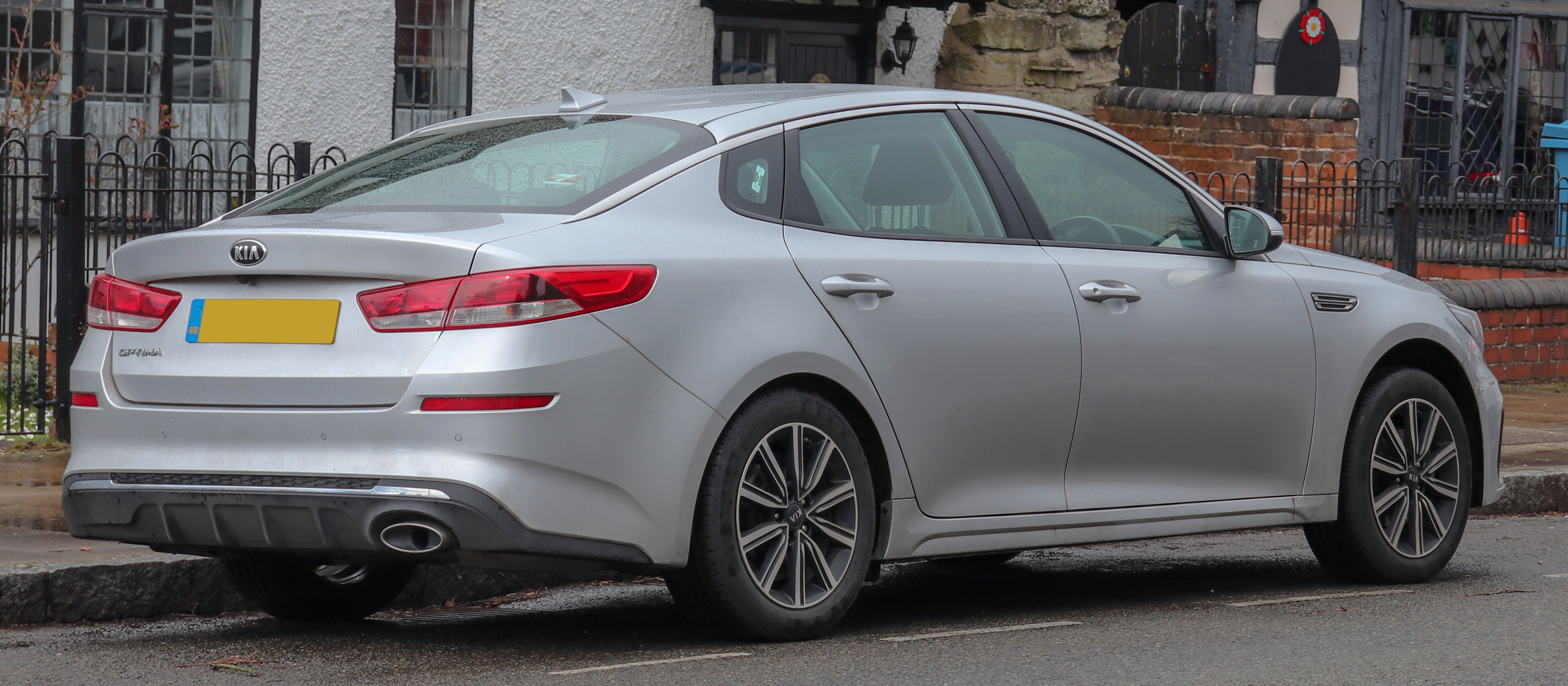
Facelift (2018)

The facelifted Kia Optima was officially revealed at the 2018 Geneva Motor Show. In January, the facelifted Kia K5 was introduced in South Korean market.

=== Safety ===
The 2017 Optima received a "Top Safety Pick+" rating from the Insurance Institute for Highway Safety (IIHS).

Test	Rating
Overall:	5/5 stars
Small overlap front:	Good
Moderate overlap front:	Good
Side:	Good
Roof strength:	Good
Head restraints & seats:	Good
Front crash prevention:	Superior
Headlights:	Good
Child seat anchors (Latch) ease of use:	Acceptable

ANCAP test results Kia Optima all variants (2015, aligned with Euro NCAP)
Test	Points	%
Overall:	5 /5 stars	
Adult occupant:	33.4	88%
Child occupant:	42.5	86%
Pedestrian:	24.2	67%
Safety assist:	9.6	74%

=== Awards ===
The Optima is a two-time winner of the International Car of the Year award. it also won the 2016 Red Dot "Best of the Best" Award.

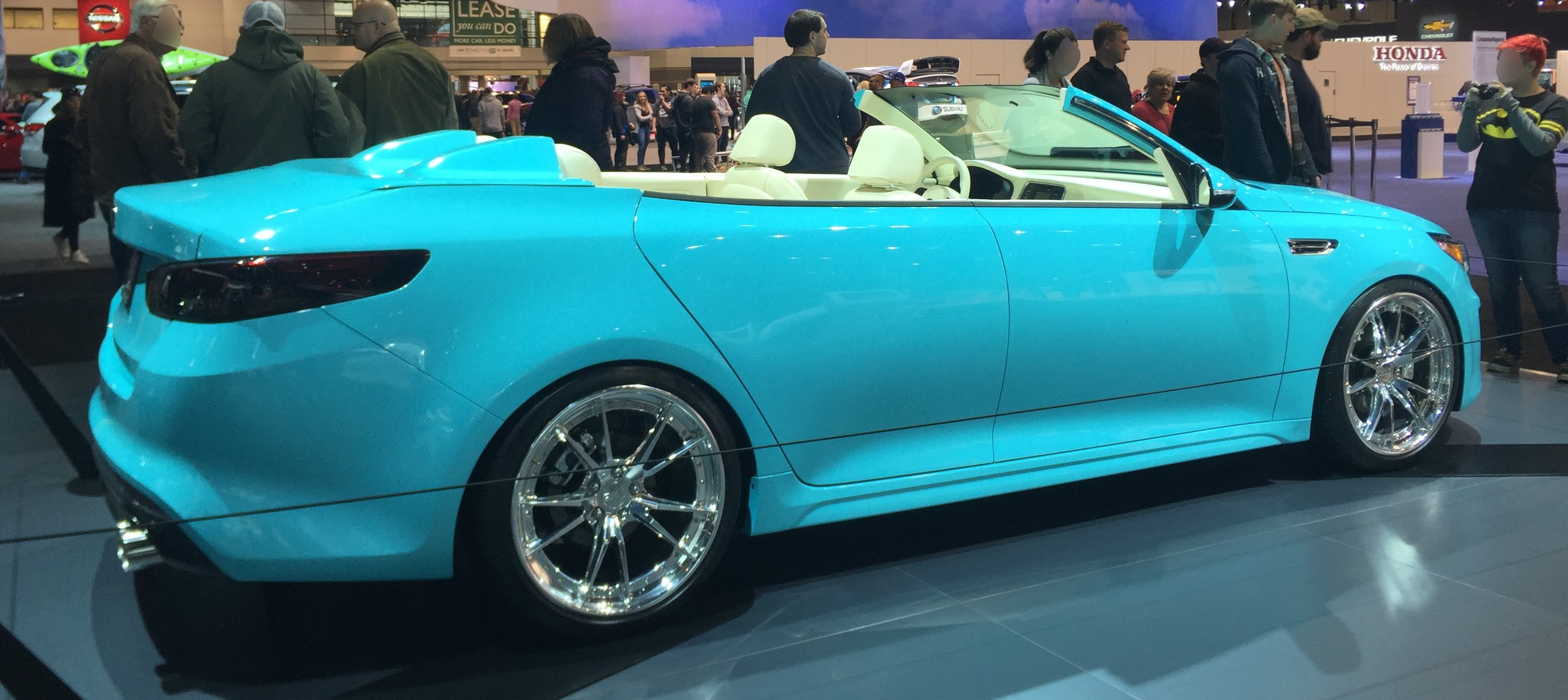
Kia Optima Convertible Concept rear view

=== Kia Optima Convertible Concept ===
The Kia Optima Convertible Concept was shown in 2015; a 4-door concept car similar to the Kia Optima sedan without a roof and rear-hinged doors for the rear passengers in place of the front-hinged doors of the production car.

== Fifth generation (DL3; 2019) ==
Fifth generation
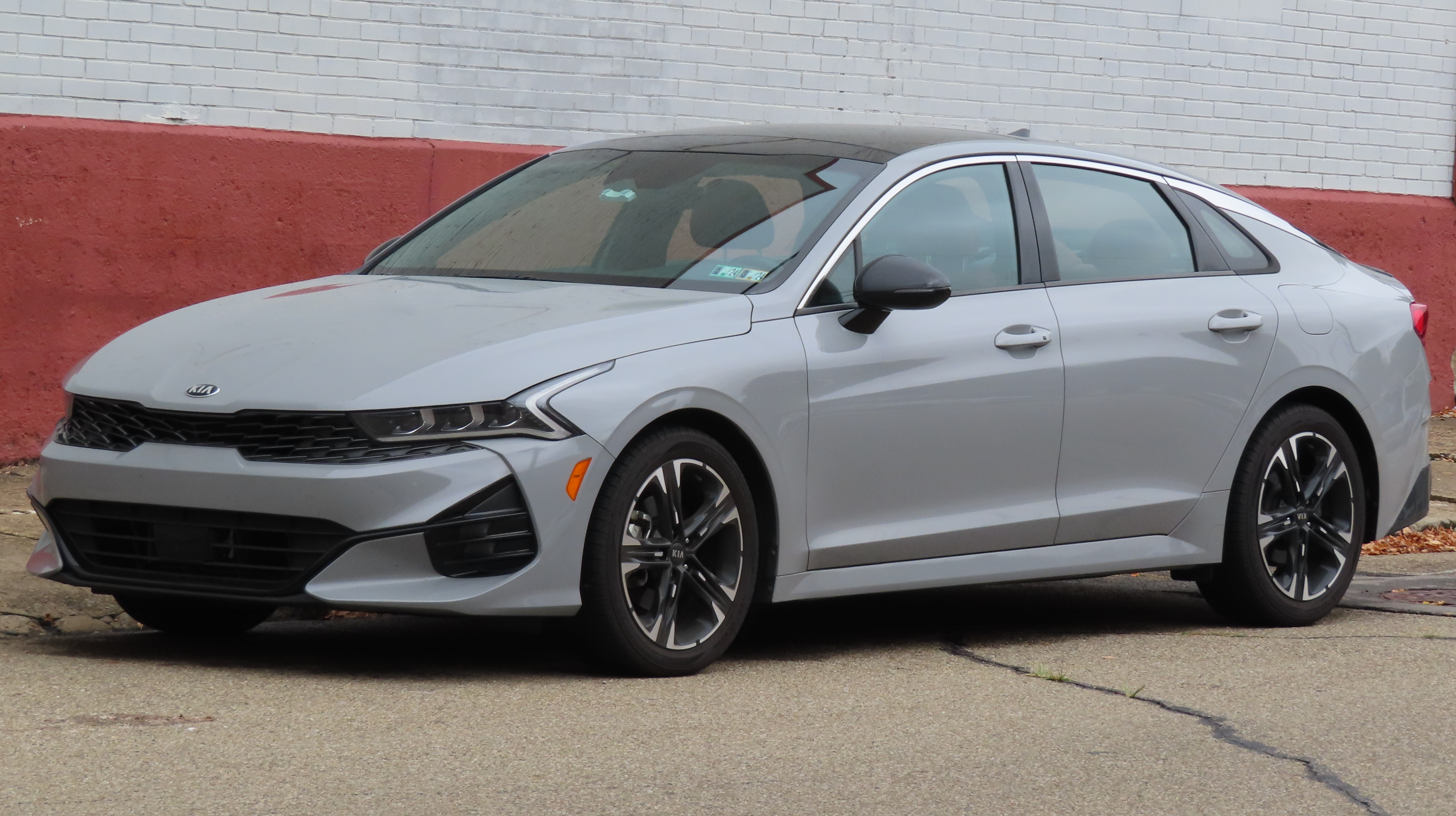
- 2021 K5 GT-Line

Overview
- Model code: DL3
- Production: 2019–present
- Model years: 2021–present
- Assembly: South Korea: Hwaseong (Hwaseong Plant); United States: West Point, Georgia (KMMG); China: Yancheng (Yancheng Plant); Russia: Kaliningrad (Avtotor); Uzbekistan: Jizzakh (ADM-Jizzakh); Vietnam: Chu Lai (THACO Kia)
- Designer: Karim Habib

Body and chassis
- Body style: 4-door sedan
- Platform: Hyundai-Kia N3
- Related: Hyundai Sonata (DN8)

Powertrain
- Engine: Gasoline: 1.5 L Smartstream G1.5 T-GDi I4; 1.6 L Smartstream G1.6 T-GDi I4; 2.0 L Smartstream G2.0 MPi I4; 2.0 L Smartstream G2.0 T-GDi I4; 2.5 L Smartstream G2.5 GDi I4; 2.5 L Smartstream G2.5 T-GDi I4; Gasoline hybrid: 2.0 L Smartstream G2.0 HEV I4; Gasoline/LPG: 2.0 L Smartstream G2.0 LPi I4
- Transmission: 6-speed automatic; 8-speed automatic; 7-speed dual-clutch automatic; 8-speed dual-clutch automatic
- Hybrid drivetrain: Parallel hybrid

Dimensions
- Wheelbase: 2,850 mm (112.2 in); 2,900 mm (114.2 in) (China)
- Length: 4,905 mm (193.1 in); 4,980 mm (196 in) (China)
- Width: 1,860 mm (73.2 in)
- Height: 1,445 mm (56.9 in)
- Curb weight: 1,410–1,515 kg (3,109–3,340 lb)

The fifth generation Optima is badged as the K5 worldwide. It was first unveiled in November 2019 and released in South Korea on 12 December 2019. Its overall design is similar to that of the Sonata, with a fastback-like profile. However, the styling is unique, featuring Z-shaped running lights, a textured grille and a chrome strip that runs along the window line and becomes more prominent at the C-pillar. The interior has been redesigned significantly as well, with an optional 12.3-inch digital cluster and 10.3-inch center screen, augmented by Apple CarPlay and Android Auto and an optional 12-speaker Bose audio system.

Under the hood, engines mostly mirror that of the Sonata, with the base 4-cylinder turbo 1.6-liter engine producing 180 hp and 195 lb⋅ft of torque and the GT receiving a high-performance 2.5-liter turbocharged four-cylinder unit with 286 hp and 311 lb⋅ft of torque. All-wheel drive is newly available on some trim levels, distinguishing it from the Sonata.

Depending on the market, Advanced Driver Assistance Systems (ADAS) include Forward Collision-avoidance Assist (FCA), Blind-spot View Monitor (BVM) with Surround View Monitor (SVM) and Blind-spot Collision-avoid Assist (BCA), Smart Cruise Control (SCC) or Navigation-based SCC (NSCC), Lane Following Assist (LFA), Driver Attention Warning (DAW), and Highway Driving Assist (HDA).

Kia has confirmed that the car is not to be available for the European markets or any right-hand-drive markets (such as Asia, Australasia and Africa) due to the shrinking traditional sedan market.

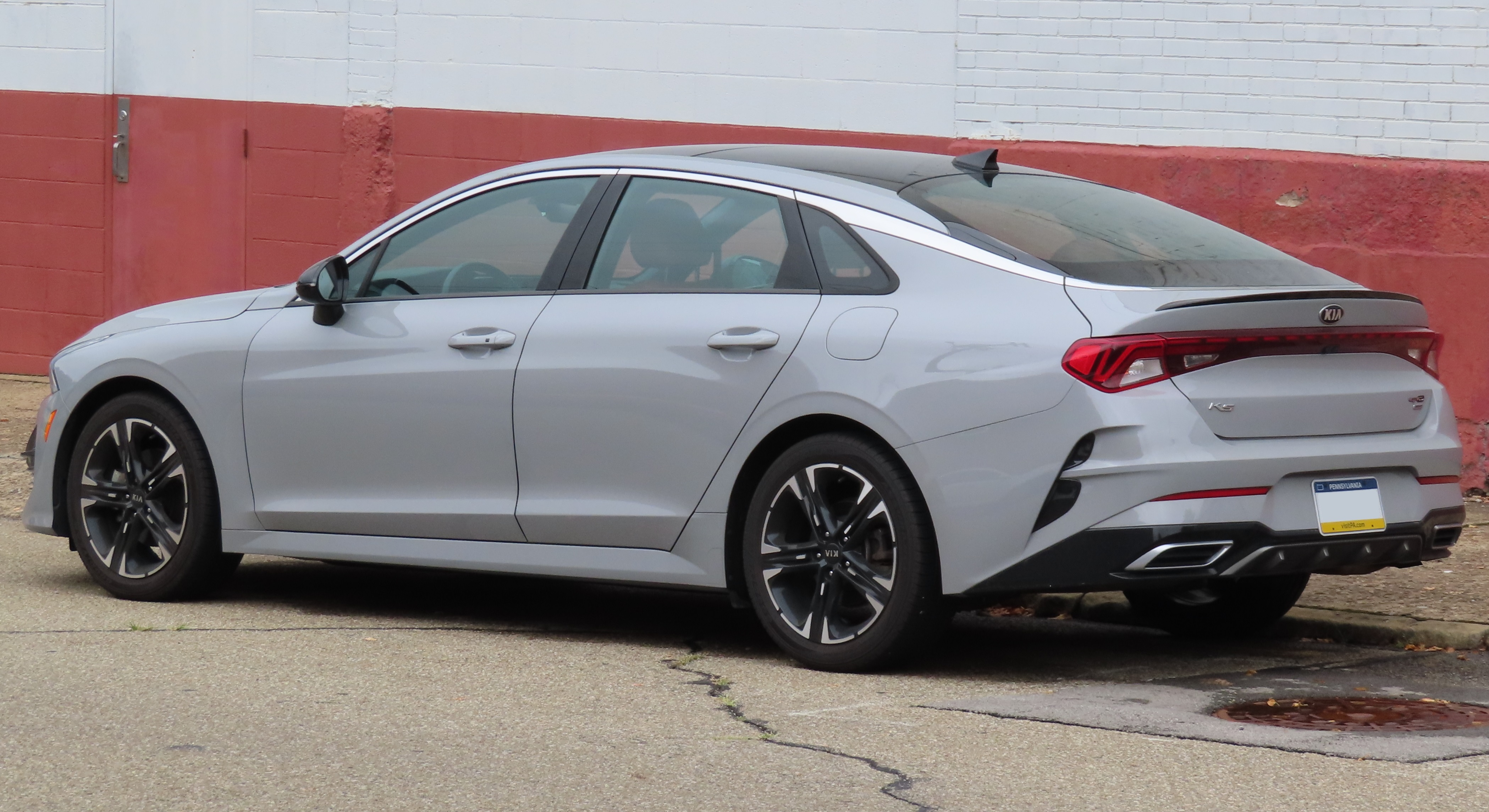
Rear view (GT-Line, US)

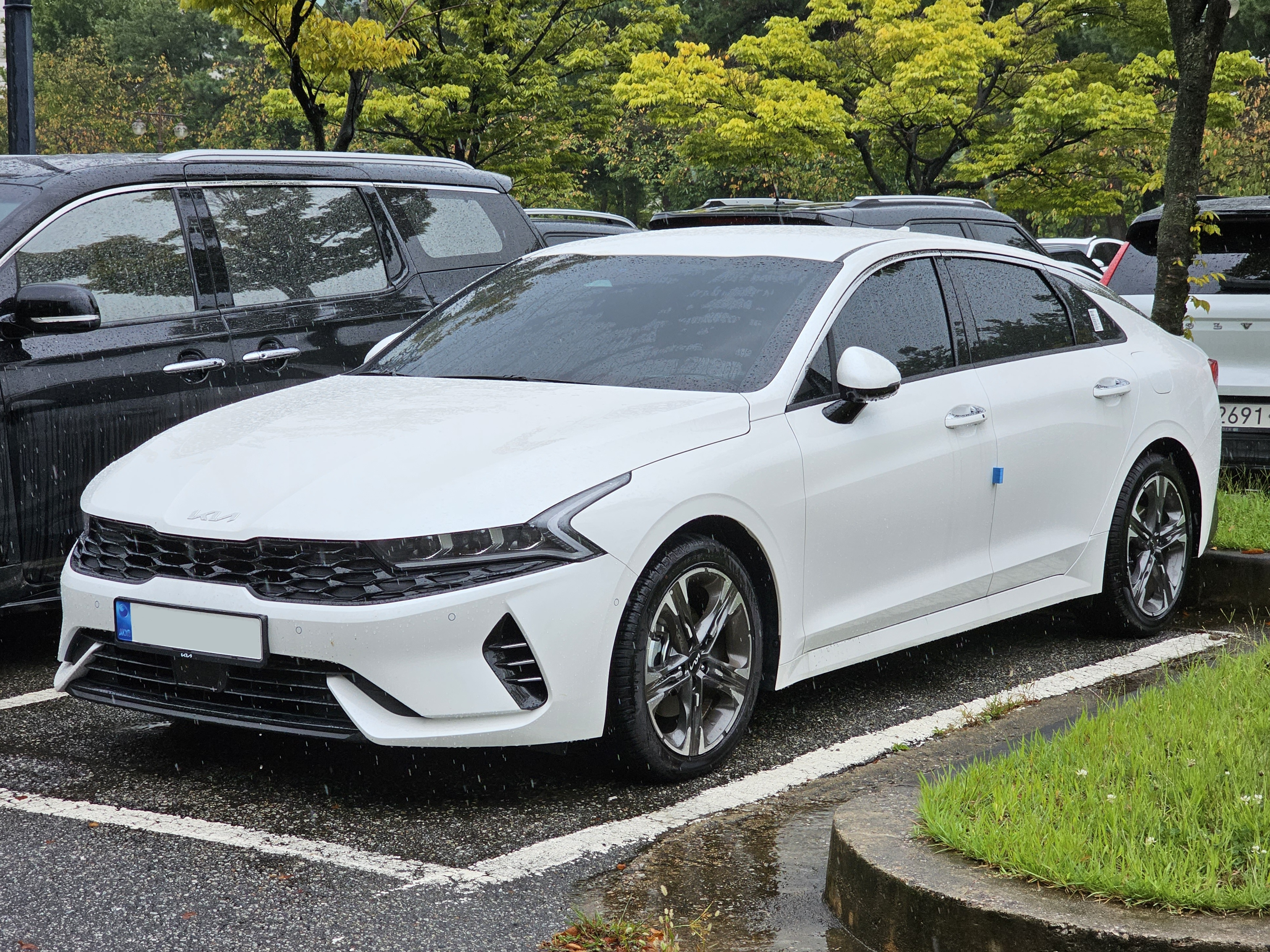
K5 Hybrid (South Korea)

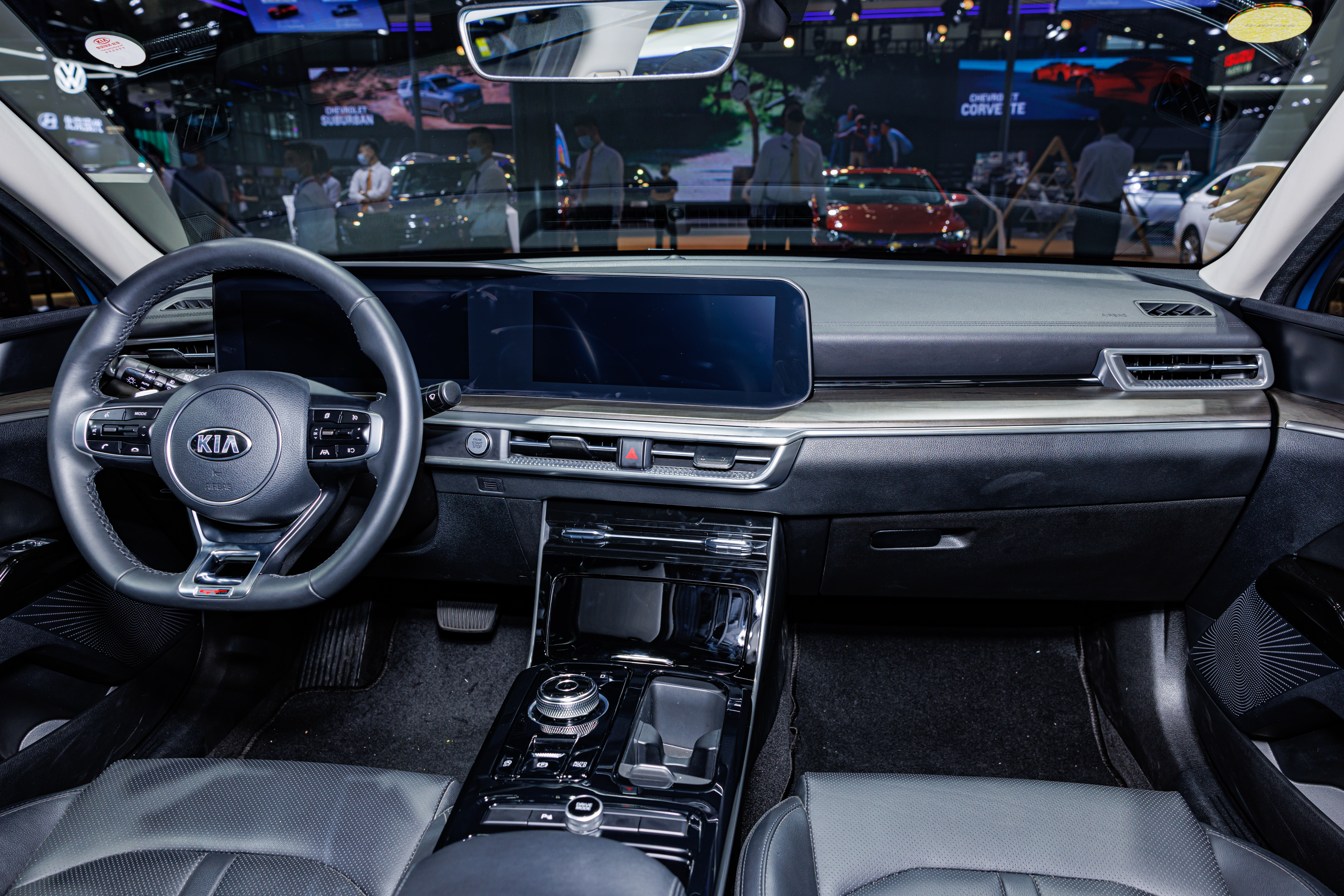
Interior

=== 2023 facelift ===
The K5 facelift was revealed on 25 October 2023 in South Korea, and at the 2024 Chicago Auto Show for the 2025 model year in North America. Changes include redesigned headlights and taillights, new front bumper with larger faux vents, new exhaust pipes for non-sportier trim levels, new exterior colors, new alloy wheel designs, an updated interior with a pair of 12 inches (30 cm) screens, the traditional gear lever replaced by a rotary selector, and new technological features.

The facelifted K5 also has a new base engine, dropping the 1.6-liter turbo in favor of a naturally aspirated 2.5-liter 4 cylinder making 191 horsepower and 181 foot pounds of torque.

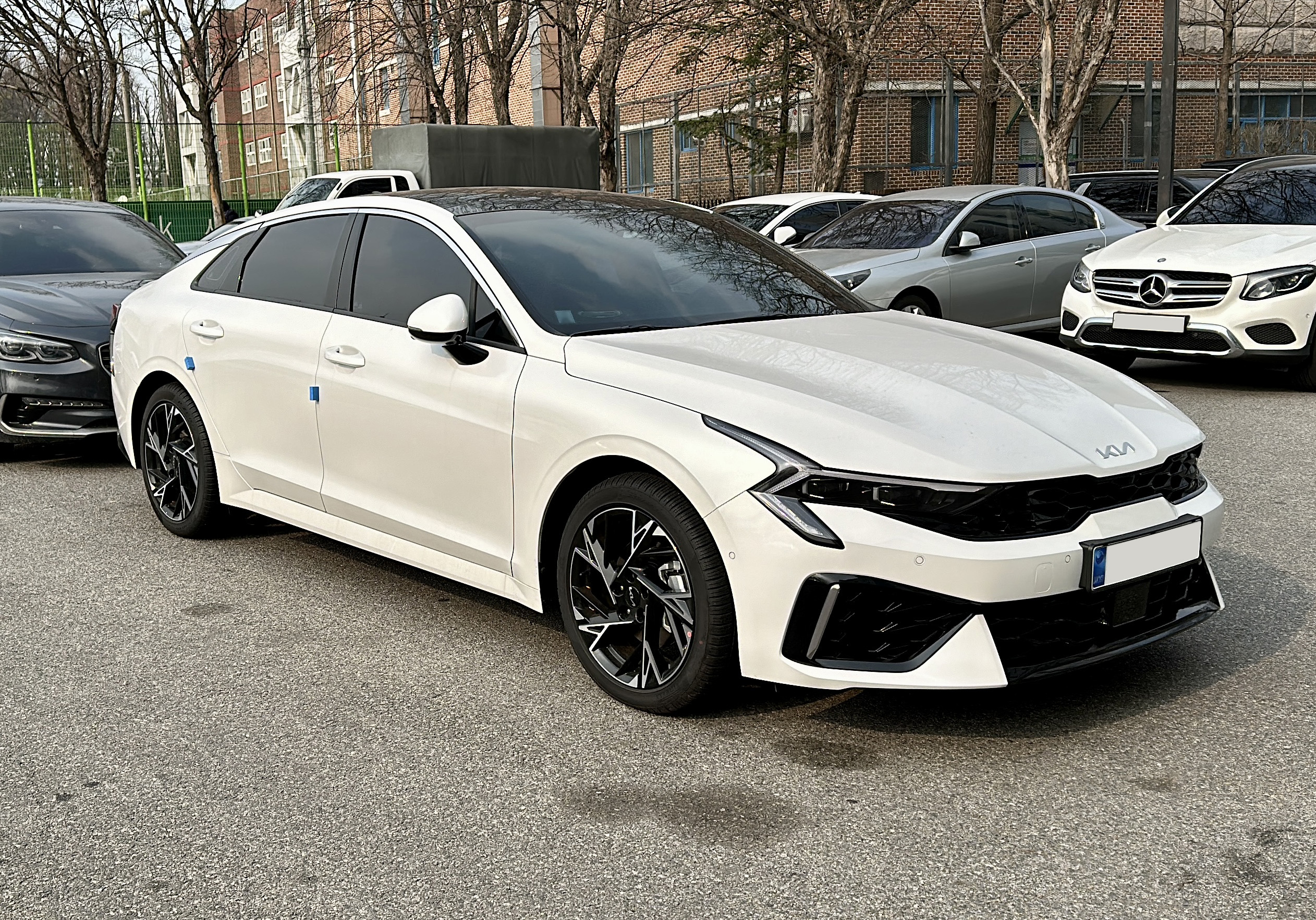
2025 K5 (facelift)

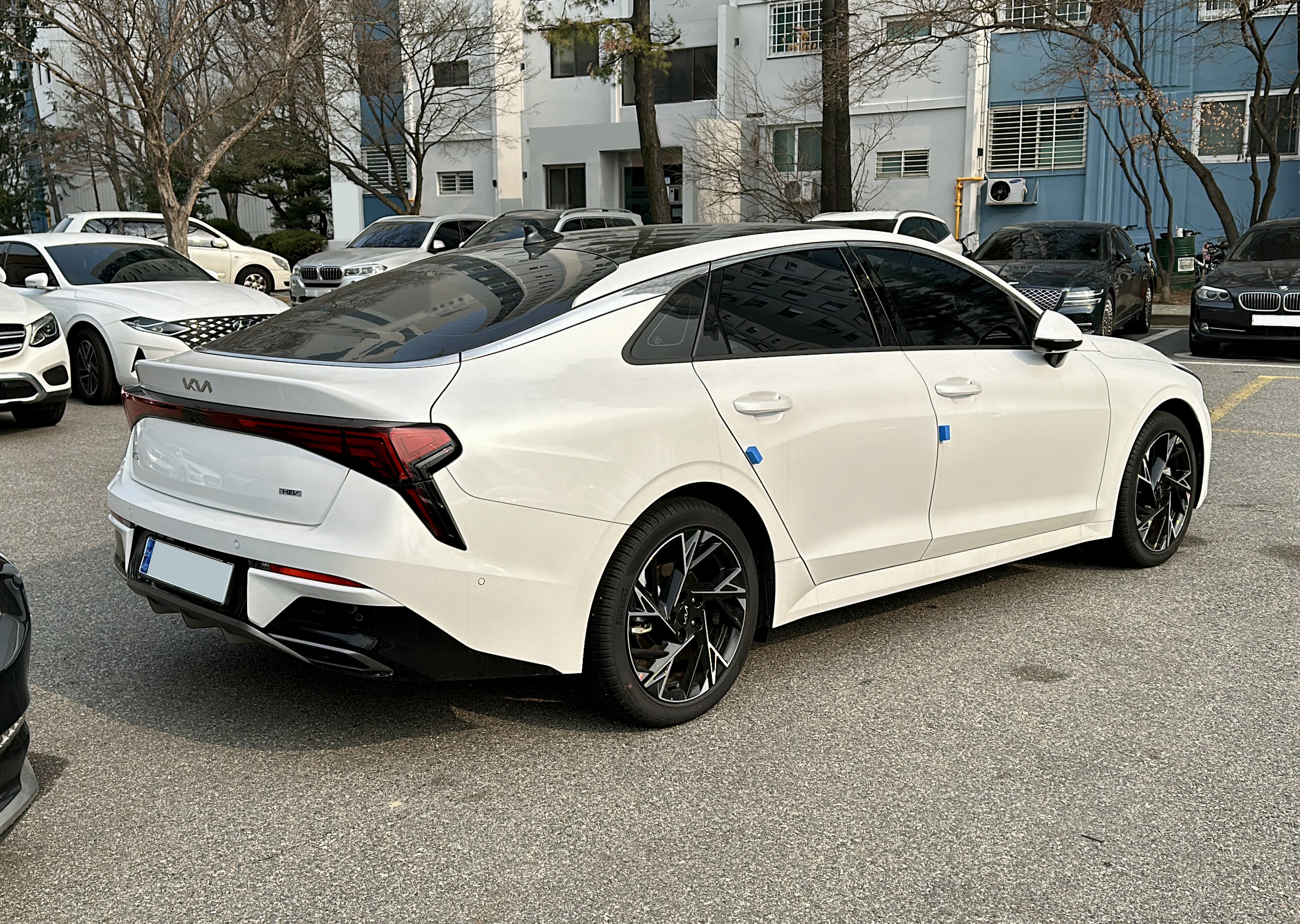
Rear view (facelift)

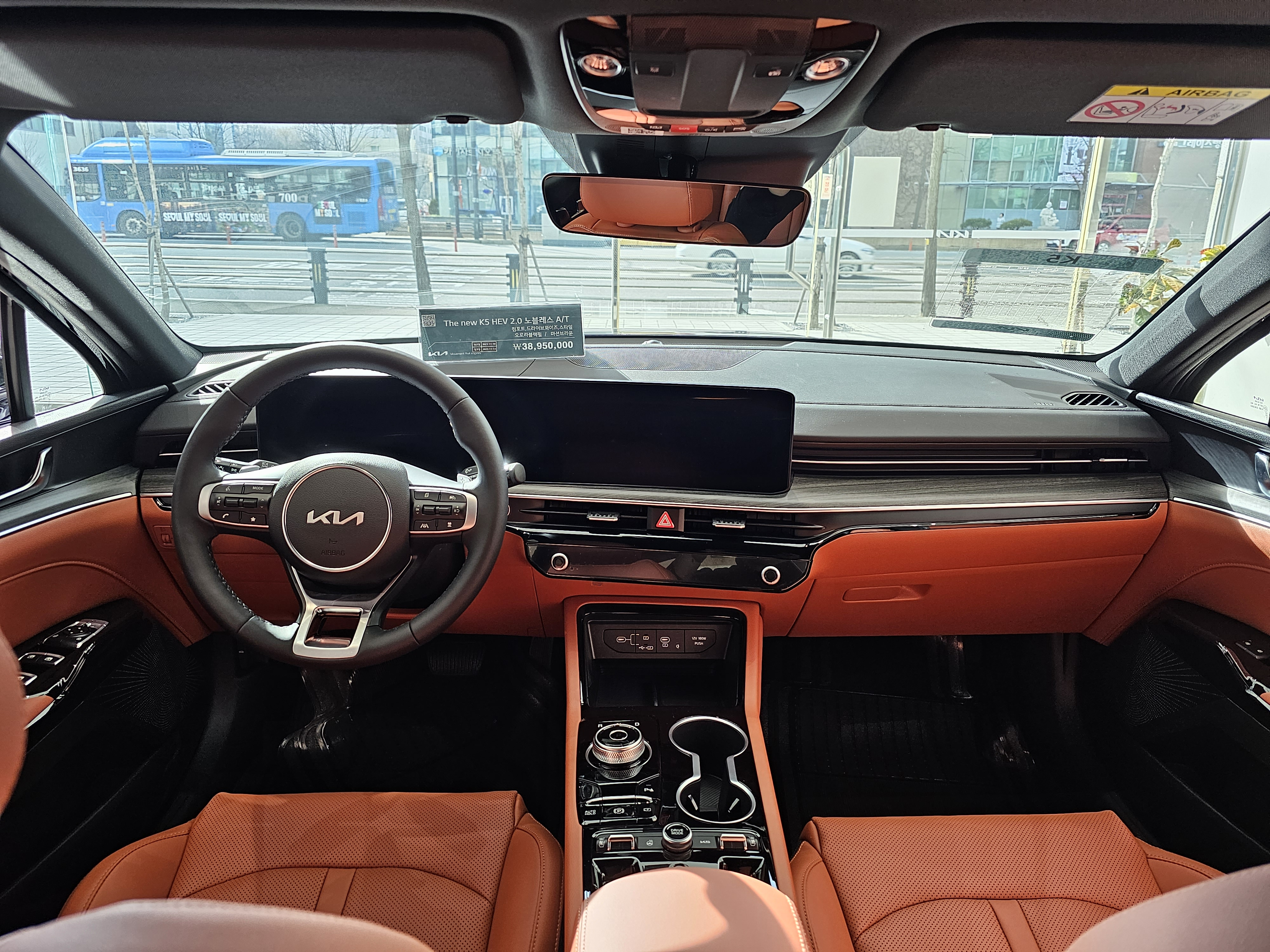
Interior (facelift)

=== Markets ===
==== North America ====
In June 2020, Kia unveiled the US-market K5, renaming it from the Optima. Both the 1.6-liter turbocharged and 2.5-liter naturally aspirated Smartstream inline four-cylinder gasoline engines will be available with either front wheel drive or all wheel drive; the 2.5-liter turbocharged engine is available only in front wheel drive and is mated to an eight-speed wet dual-clutch transmission. Trim levels include LX, LXS, GT-Line, EX, and GT, with the GT-Line being the only trim to offer All-Wheel Drive (AWD) as an option for the 1.6L turbocharged engine. US specification models will be assembled at Kia's West Point, Georgia assembly plant (KMMG). The K5 is no longer available in Canada as of the 2025 model year. Production of the K5 in the United States ended in 2024 with the KMMG plant shifting its focus to the Telluride and Kia's EV lineup. American models are now sourced from Korea.

=== Powertrain ===
Specs
Gasoline engines
Model	Years	Transmission	Power	Torque	0–100 km/h (0–62 mph) (Official)	Top Speed
Smartstream G1.5 T-GDi	2020–present	7–speed dual clutch	125 kW (170 PS; 168 hp) at 5500 rpm	253 N⋅m (187 lb⋅ft) at 1500–4000 rpm		
Smartstream G1.6 T-GDi	2019–present	8–speed automatic	132 kW (180 PS; 178 hp) at 5500 rpm	265 N⋅m (195 lb⋅ft) at 1500–4500 rpm		
Smartstream G2.0 LPi	2019–present	6–speed automatic	107 kW (146 PS; 144 hp) at 6000 rpm	191 N⋅m (141 lb⋅ft) at 4200 rpm		
Smartstream G2.0 MPi	2019–present	6–speed automatic	118 kW (160 PS; 158 hp) at 6500 rpm	196 N⋅m (145 lb⋅ft) at 4800 rpm	10.6s	
Smartstream G2.0 Hybrid	2019–present	6–speed automatic	143 kW (195 PS; 192 hp) at 6000 rpm			
Smartstream G2.0 T-GDi	2020–present	8–speed automatic	177 kW (240 PS; 237 hp) at 6000 rpm	353 N⋅m (260 lb⋅ft) at 1500–4000 rpm		
Smartstream G2.5 GDi	2019–present	8–speed automatic	143 kW (194 PS; 191 hp) at 6100 rpm	245 N⋅m (181 lb⋅ft) at 4000 rpm	8.6s	
Smartstream G2.5 T-GDi	2019–present	8–speed dual clutch	213 kW (290 PS; 286 hp) at 6000 rpm	422 N⋅m (311 lb⋅ft) at 1750–4000 rpm	6.6s	

=== Safety ===
The 2021–2022 K5 was awarded a Top Safety Pick+ from the IIHS.

NHTSA (US)		IIHS (US)	
Overall	5/5 stars	Small overlap front, driver	Good
Frontal, driver	5/5 stars	Small overlap front, passenger	Good
Frontal, passenger	4/5 stars	Moderate overlap front	Good
Side, driver	5/5 stars	Side	Good
Side, rear passenger	5/5 stars	Roof strength	Good
Side pole	5/5 stars	Head restraints & seats	Good
Rollover	/ 10.70%	Headlights	Good/Acceptable/Marginal/Poor (depending on trim)
		Front crash prevention: vehicle-to-vehicle	Superior
		Front crash prevention: vehicle-to-pedestrian	Superior/Advanced (depending on trim)
		LATCH ease of use	Acceptable

== Motorsport ==
The third generation Kia Optima was an official entry in the Pirelli World Challenge. In June 2012, Michael Galati drove the Infinity Audio-sponsored Optima to Kia's first victory in round 8 of the 2012 season at Canadian Tire Motorsport Park in Bowmanville, Ontario, Canada, while teammate Mark Wilkins finished in second place.

Kia Racing clinched the 2014 Pirelli World Challenge Grand Touring Sport (GTS) Class Manufacturer Championship in only its third season of competition. Kia defeated rivals Ford, Chevrolet, Porsche, Aston Martin and Nissan to become the first Korean auto manufacturer to win the championship. Kia Racing finished the season with 13 podium finishes, including 5 race wins. Meanwhile, the turbocharged Optima race cars led more on-track miles than any other manufacturer in the class this season.

The race car weighs 2,950 pounds (1,338 kg) and is powered by an inline 4-cylinder engine generating 368 horsepower and uses a 6-speed sequential transmission. It reaches 0 to 60 miles per hour (0 to 97 km/h) in 4.7 seconds and has a top speed of 160 miles per hour (257 km/h).

== Sales ==
Calendar year	United States	South Korea	China	Global
2000	97	31,505		
2001	25,912	52,892		
2002	26,793	48,032		
2003	34,681	31,817		
2004	53,492	29,956		
2005	41,349	34,657		
2006	38,408	34,704		
2007	40,901	32,711		
2008	44,904	43,958		
2009	37,527	49,054		
2010	27,382	79,491		
2011	84,590	87,452		
2012	152,399	77,952		259,551
2013	155,893	63,007		
2014	159,020	49,000		300,685
2015	159,414	58,619		308,683
2016	124,203	44,636		238,281
2017	107,493	38,184		
2018	101,603	48,502		
2019	96,623	39,668		
2020	80,140 (Note: includes both Optima and K5 models)	84,550		
2021	92,342	59,499		
2022	66,298	31,498		
2023	64,772	34,579	2,668	
2024	46,311	33,837	765	
2025	72,751		1,093	
