= HiPhi Y =

Chinese mid-size crossover SUV

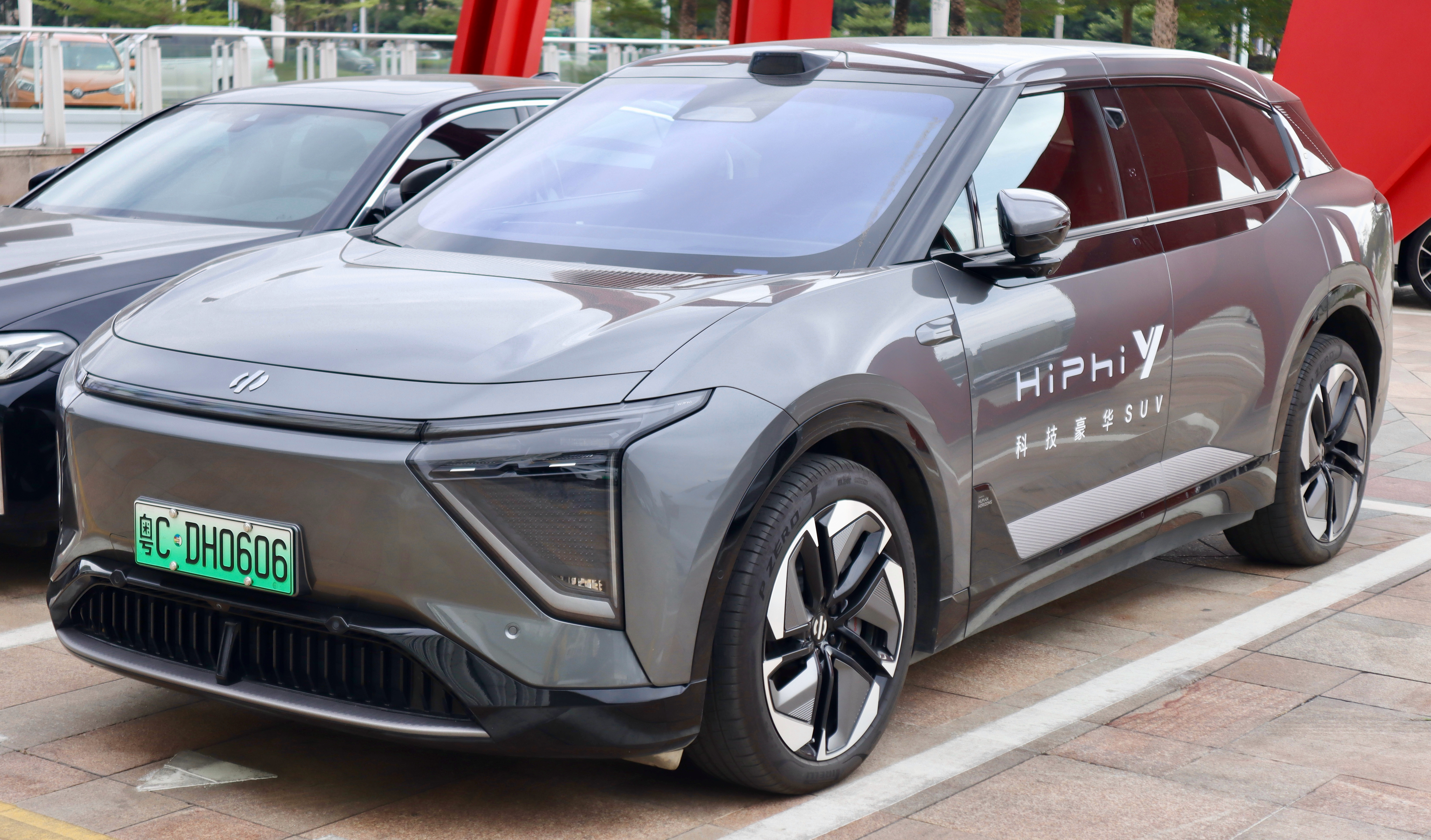

Overview
- Manufacturer: HiPhi
- Production: July 2023–2024
- Model years: 2023–2024
- Assembly: China: Yancheng (DYK)

Body and chassis
- Class: Mid-size luxury crossover SUV
- Body style: 5-door SUV
- Layout: Rear-motor, rear-wheel-drive Dual-motor, four-wheel-drive
- Doors: Conventional (Front); wing doors (Falcon coach) (Rear)

Powertrain
- Electric motor: Permanent magnet synchronous motor
- Transmission: 1-speed fixed gear
- Battery: 76.6 kWh lithium-ion 115 kWh lithium-ion
- Electric range: 560–810 km (348–503 mi)

Dimensions
- Wheelbase: 2,950 mm (116.1 in)
- Length: 4,938 mm (194.4 in)
- Width: 1,958 mm (77.1 in)
- Height: 1,658 mm (65.3 in)
- Kerb weight: 2,430 kg (5,357 lb)

The HiPhi Y is a battery electric mid-size luxury crossover SUV produced by Human Horizons under the HiPhi brand.

== Overview ==
In April 2023, the HiPhi lineup was expanded to include a third vehicle, with premiering at Auto Shanghai 2023. The Y took the form of a large crossover placed in the range below the flagship HiPhi X, sharing a common floor and technical solutions with it and the HiPhi Z. In terms of style, the car retained the company's design language, combining an irregularly shaped window line with a gently sloping roofline, large wheel arches and an extensive lighting system. The headlights, in addition to LED strips running across the entire width of the body, have large triangular light surfaces that can display various animated pictograms. The rear lamps are formed by a light strip with two-part tips, and under the window line there is an interactive display presenting moving graphic symbols - like headlights.

Similar to the larger X, the Y is equipped with a unique rear door system consisting of additional roof sections that open upwards to facilitate access to the second row of seats. Available trim levels are Flagship, Long Range, Elite, and Pioneer.

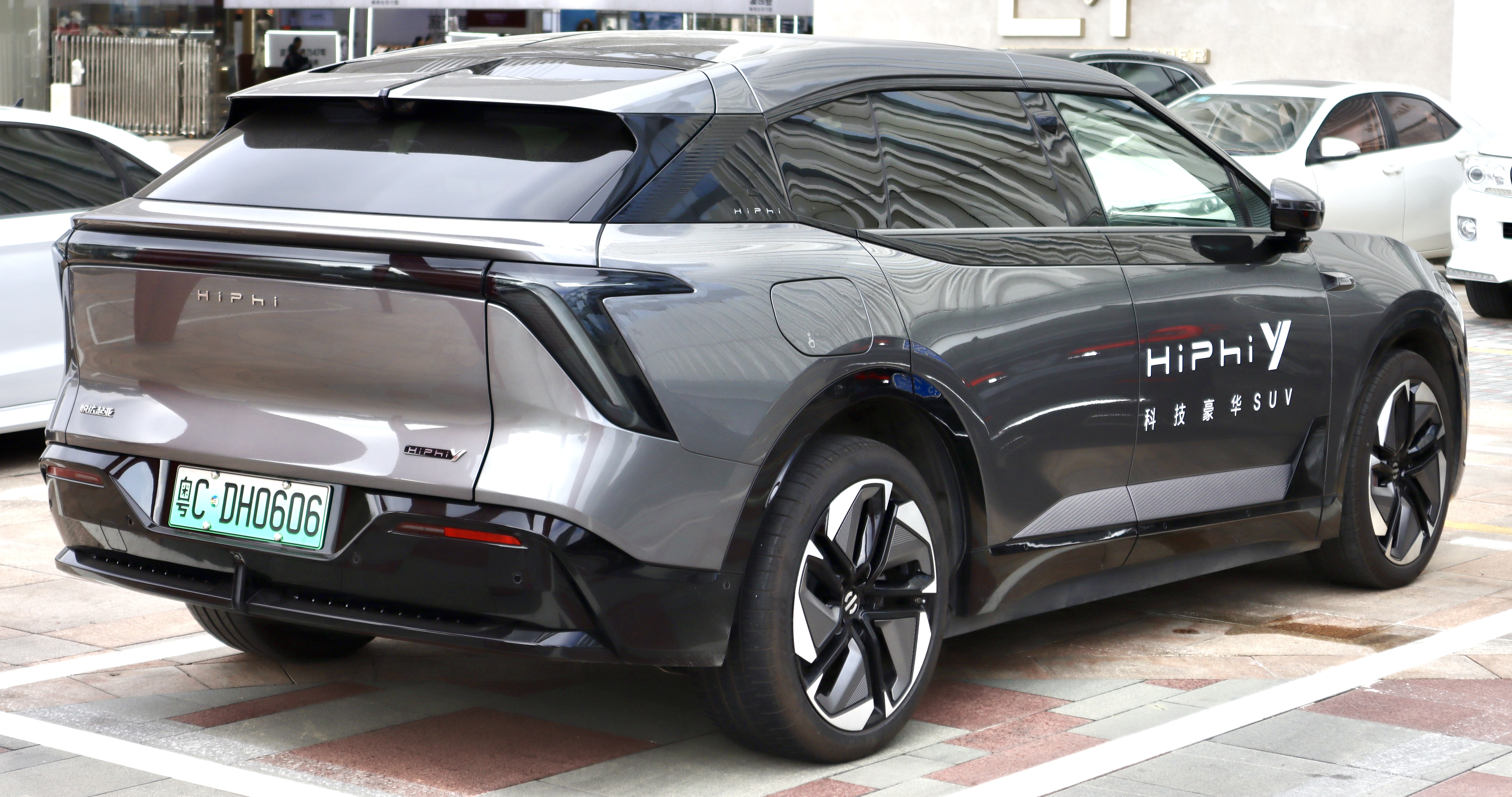
Rear view

== Specifications ==
The Y features a 17-inch OLED center display screen, with a 15-inch HD passenger touch screen. A 12.3-inch full LCD instrument cluster is included for the driver. A Meridian Audio system, a 9.2-inch streaming media rear-view mirror, and a 22.9-inch HD color heads-up display come standard for all models. Behind the front passenger touch screen is a HiPhi Box high-performance computer equipped with a Qualcomm Snapdragon 8250 chip, able to support media casting and Bluetooth connectivity for a keyboard and mouse.

=== Powertrain ===
The Y is a fully electric car with two types of drive and two types of batteries. The rear-wheel drive version develops a power of 331 HP, while the two-engine version delivers power to both axles at 498 HP. The larger battery has a capacity of 76.6 kWh, while the top one has a capacity of 115 kWh. The range of "Y", depending on the configuration, is approximately 560, 765 or 810 kilometers on one charge according to the Chinese CLTC measurement procedure.

== Markets ==
The start of sales of the Y on the domestic Chinese market began in July 2023. It was also included in expansion plans on Western European markets. The main sales markets include: Sweden, the Netherlands, Denmark, Germany and Norway, and the United Kingdom in 2024.

=== China ===
The Y debuted in Shanghai in April 2023 at Auto Shanghai 2023 and was launched in Shanghai in July 18, 2023, with deliveries starting on July 29, 2023.

=== Europe ===
The Y made its debut at the 2023 Goodwood Festival of Speed on July 13, with plans to go on sale in the region starting in 2024.

== Sales ==
| Year | China |
|---|---|
| 2023 | 4,943 |
| 2024 | 349 |
| 2025 | 76 |
