= NEVS Emily GT =

Overview
- Manufacturer: NEVS
- Production: 2020 (six prototypes)
- Assembly: Sweden: Trollhättan
- Designer: Simon Padin

Body and chassis
- Layout: Each wheel
- Platform: 4× 121 hp (90 kW) electric motors

Powertrain
- Battery: 175 kWh (630 MJ)

The NEVS Emily GT is an electric luxury sedan concept developed by NEVS AB (National Electric Vehicle Sweden) and unveiled publicly in 2023. It remerged in 2024 under new ownership but then stalled again and never reached production.

== Background ==
NEVS, which acquired the former Saab Automobile assets in 2012, initiated the Emily GT project as a way to redefine its image and platform for electric mobility. Development of the Emily GT began in late 2019 and the prototype was built in just ten months. The project remained largely secret until being revealed in 2023.

The design was by Saab designer Simon Padin and featured hub-mounted electric motors in each wheel, providing a total of 484bhp and was fitted with a large 175kWh battery.

In April 2024, a Canadian start-up EV Electra reportedly acquired the rights to the Emily GT project and announced plans to produce the car, possibly at a factory in Italy or elsewhere. However, by mid-2025 NEVS reportedly had just five staff remaining, with the future of Emily GT still in limbo.
