= Human Horizons =

Chinese electric car manufacturer

Human Horizons 华人运通
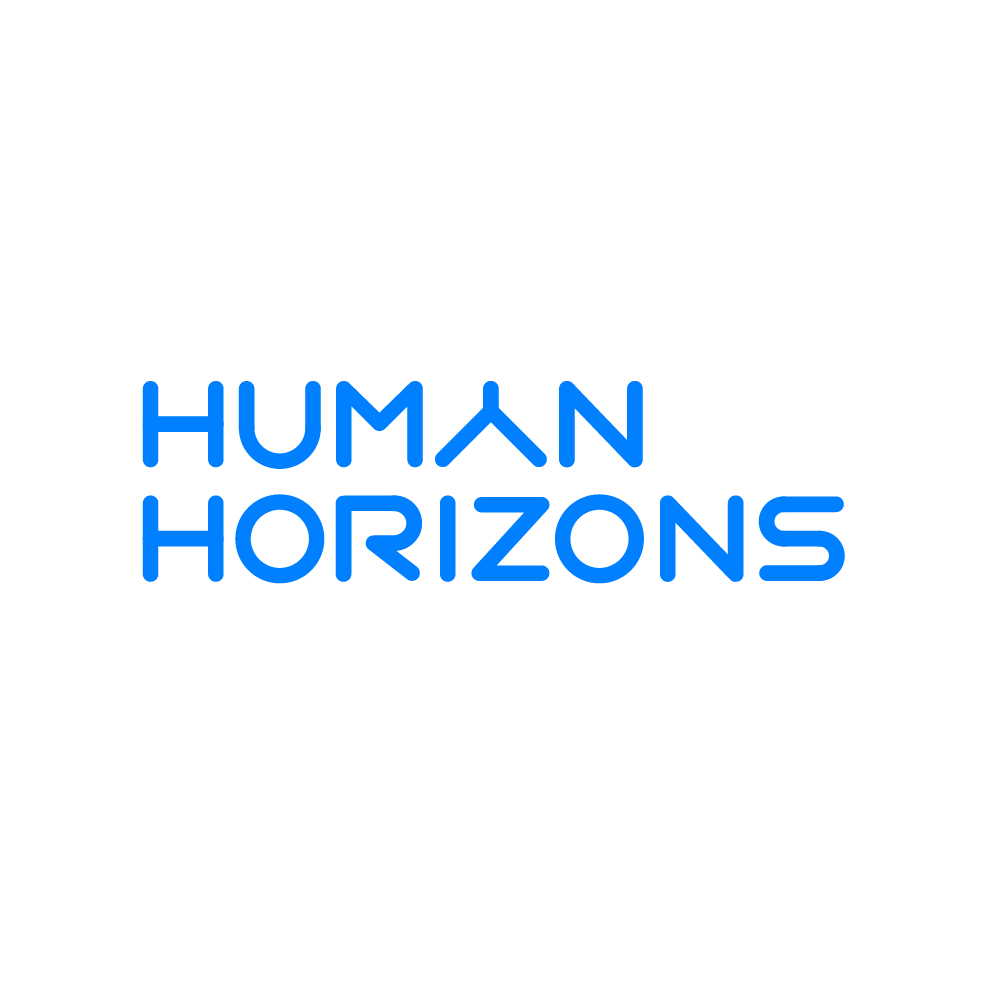
- Company type: Private
- Industry: Automotive, E-Mobility
- Founded: August 2017; 8 years ago
- Founder: Ding Lei
- Defunct: August 2024
- Headquarters: Shanghai, China
- Key people: Ding Lei; Phil Murtaugh (Vice Chairman); Kevin Chen (COO); James C. Shyr (CDO); Mark Stanton (CTO)
- Products: Electric Vehicles
- Website: human-horizons.com

Human Horizons Technology was a Chinese electric car manufacturer company based in Shanghai that made electric cars under the HiPhi marque. It operated a production and assembly smart plant in Yancheng, Jiangsu, and its parts boutique prototype factory in Jinqiao, Shanghai.

== History ==
Human Horizons was founded in August 2017 by Ding Lei.

The company's headquarters is in Shanghai. The company was named the Human Horizons name on 25 October 2018, alongside three Human Horizons concept cars.

On 31 July 2019, the HiPhi brand was launched alongside its first concept car, the HiPhi 1.

In September 2020, Human Horizons launched the HiPhi X, a luxury pure electric vehicle. On 8 May 2021, HiPhi X began to be delivered to Chinese car owners. On November 6 of the same year, Chinese Horizon launched HiPhi Z. On 31 March 2022, HiPhi Z GT was released.

In April 2023, the company's third model debuted, positioned below the flagship "X", a large crossover HiPhi Y. In parallel, the company announced plans to start sales in Europe, starting with the "X" model. In November 2023, the high-performance version of the flagship "Z" debuted under the name HiPhi A.

At the beginning of 2024, Human Horizons found itself in a difficult financial situation, which prompted the company's management to implement radical cost-cutting measures. In January, the company closed its two large showrooms in Chengdu and Guangzhou, and also had to suspend all work of the research and development center. A month later, Human Horizons officially confirmed that it was suspending all operations, starting from the development of new products, to the production of its current cars for the next 6 months. In addition, staff received salary cuts of up to 70% of their salary, encouraging staff to look for a new employer.

After an unsuccessful search for new owners, considering either selling shares or entering into cooperation within a joint venture, Human Horizons filed for bankruptcy in early August 2024.

== Products ==
- HiPhi X
- HiPhi Y
- HiPhi Z

=== Concept vehicles ===
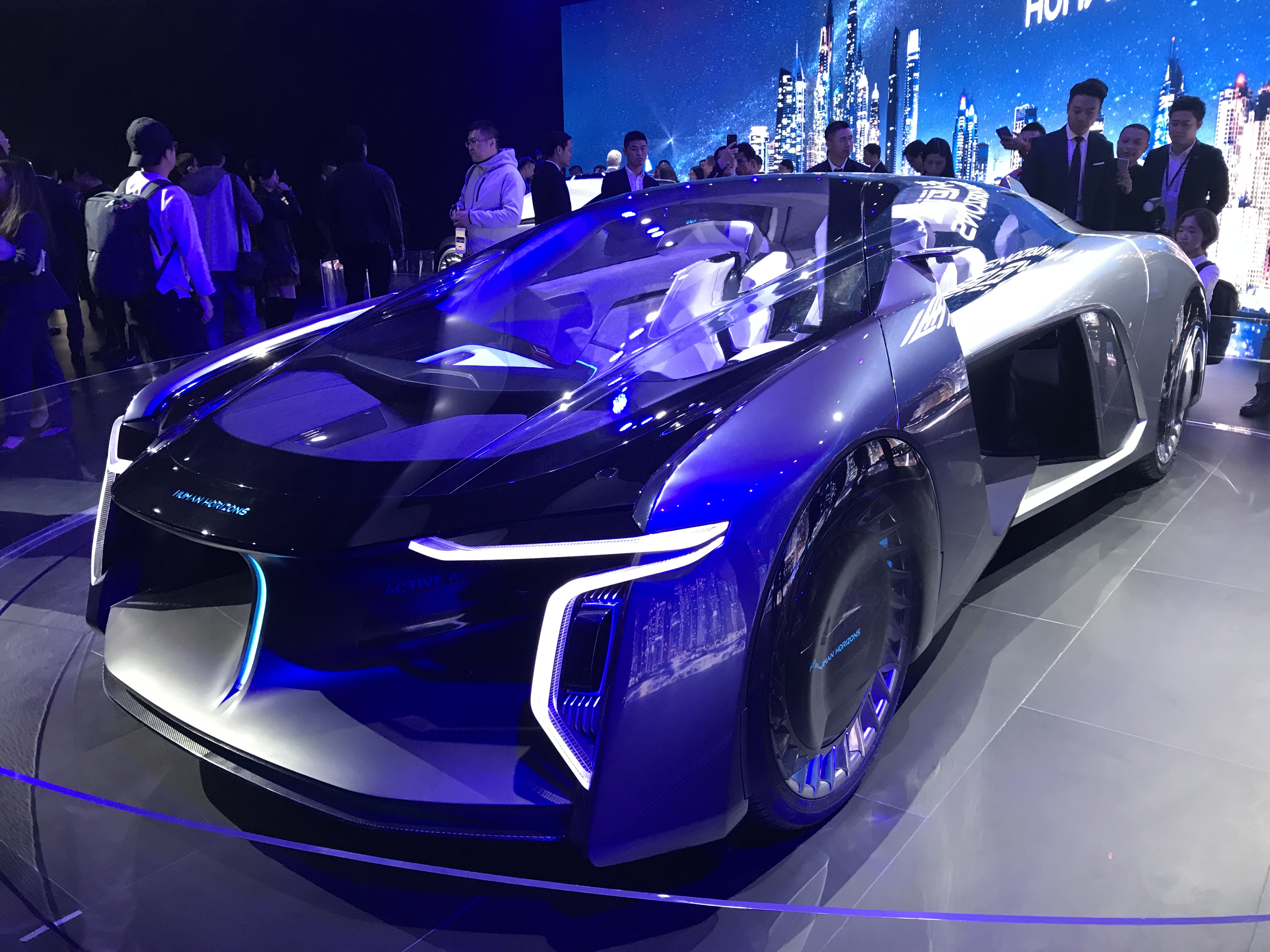
Human Horizons Concept H

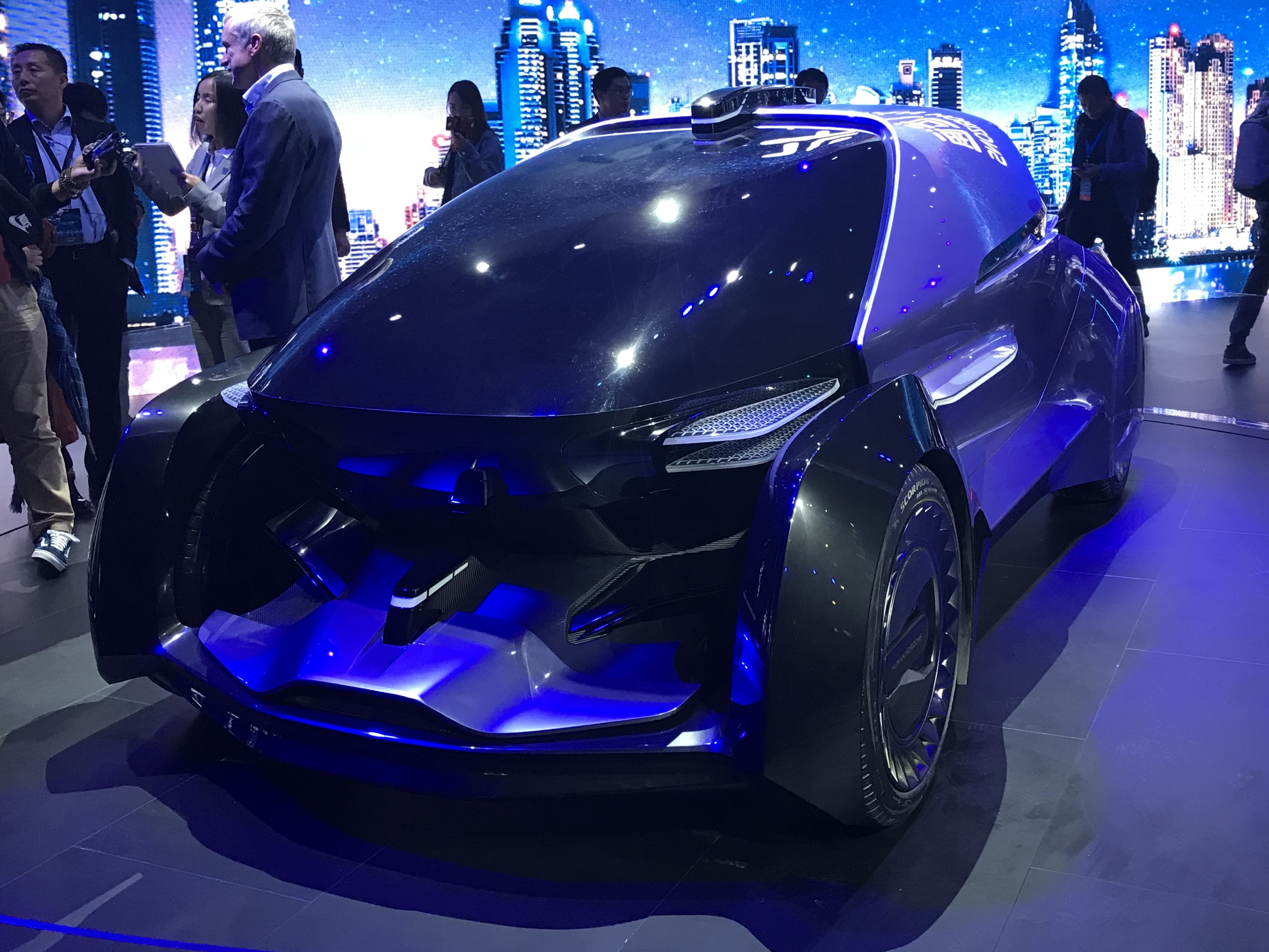
Human Horizons Concept A
