= LeSEE =

Chinese electric car company

- Website type: Electric car company
- Available in: Simplified Chinese
- Founded: 14 April 2016
- Owner: Jia Yueting
- CEO: Zhang Hailiang
- Industry: Automotive
- Website: lesee.leeco.com
- Commercial: yes

LeSEE, also known as LeEco Auto, LeTV Super Car, was an electric car company under LeEco. Its last CEO was Zhang Hailiang.

== Process ==
On December 9, 2014, LeTV Holdings chairman Jia Yueting began to announce that LeTV would enter the field of smart cars and begin research on electrification, intelligence, and the Internet. In September 2015, Ding Lei, former vice president of SAIC Motor Group and general manager of Shanghai General Motors Co., Ltd., joined LeTV Group as co-founder of LeTV Super Cars, global vice chairman, CEO of China and Asia Pacific.

On April 14, 2016, LeTV announced the super car brand LeSEE. On March 20, 2017, Ding Lei resigned from his positions as global vice chairman of LeTV Super Auto and CEO of China and Asia Pacific due to personal health reasons; but he still serves as a strategic advisor to LeTV Ecological Research Institute.
