= Detroit Electric SP.01 =

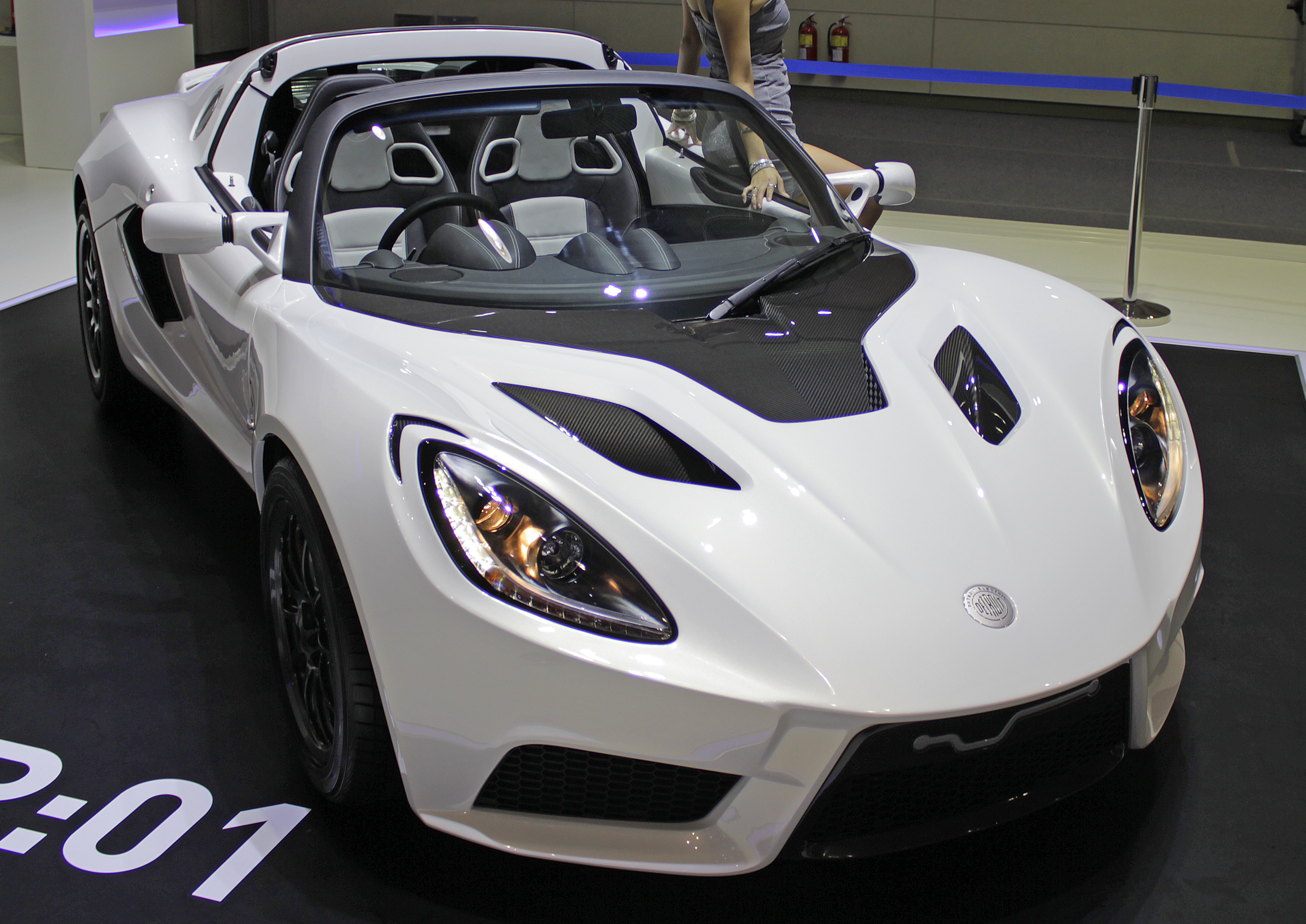

Overview
- Manufacturer: Detroit Electric
- Production: 2013 (prototype only)
- Model years: 2013

Body and chassis
- Body style: 2-door roadster
- Layout: Rear-wheel drive
- Platform: Lotus Exige

Powertrain
- Electric motor: 210 kW (280 hp)
- Battery: 37 kWh (130 MJ) lithium-polymer battery
- Electric range: 180 mi (290 km) ((NEDC)

Dimensions
- Length: 3,880 mm (152.8 in)
- Width: 1,751 mm (68.9 in)
- Height: 1,117 mm (44.0 in)
- Kerb weight: 1,155 kg (2,546 lb)

The Detroit Electric SP.01 is a proposed battery electric vehicle designed by the Detroit Electric company and originally unveiled to the media in Detroit and then publicly at the Shanghai Motor Show in 2013. It is powered by an air-cooled lithium polymer battery.

It formally launched in the UK in 2017 as a production ready model, but never progressed beyond prototype stage.

== History ==
The original Detroit Electric was an electric car model produced by the Anderson Electric Car Company in Detroit, Michigan, from 1907 to 1939.

The marque was revived in 2008 by Albert Lam, former Group CEO of the Lotus Engineering Group and executive director of Lotus Cars of England. to produce modern all-electric cars by Detroit Electric Holding Ltd. of the Netherlands.

Detroit Electric was relaunched to the world on 19 March 2013, with a press launch of its proposed new U.S. office in the Fisher Building in Detroit, Michigan but the office deal was never concluded.

In 2014 it emerged that a change of strategy relocated the proposed manufacturing if the SP01 to the UK and testing of the prototypes continued in 2014.

The SP.01 was relaunched again in 2017 following new investment from Far East Smarter Energy with $370 million for the European arm to homologate the car and prepare production in Leamington Spa.

Detroit Electric received a $1.8 billion Chinese investment in 2017 with the goal of finally producing the SP.01. The company ceased to make any further announcements after September 2017. In 2019, Aston-Martin disclosed that a $25 million payment from Detroit Electric for tooling and design consultation had not been made, with little prospects of recovering it. By this point Detroit Electric was reported to be a Chinese company.

In November 2021, Lebanese start-up EV Electra announced that it had acquired a majority stake in Detroit Electric. The $500 million investment would reportedly enable the company to expand its presence across Europe and Asia, with the aim of producing several new cars in the coming years.

== Detroit Electric SP.01 ==
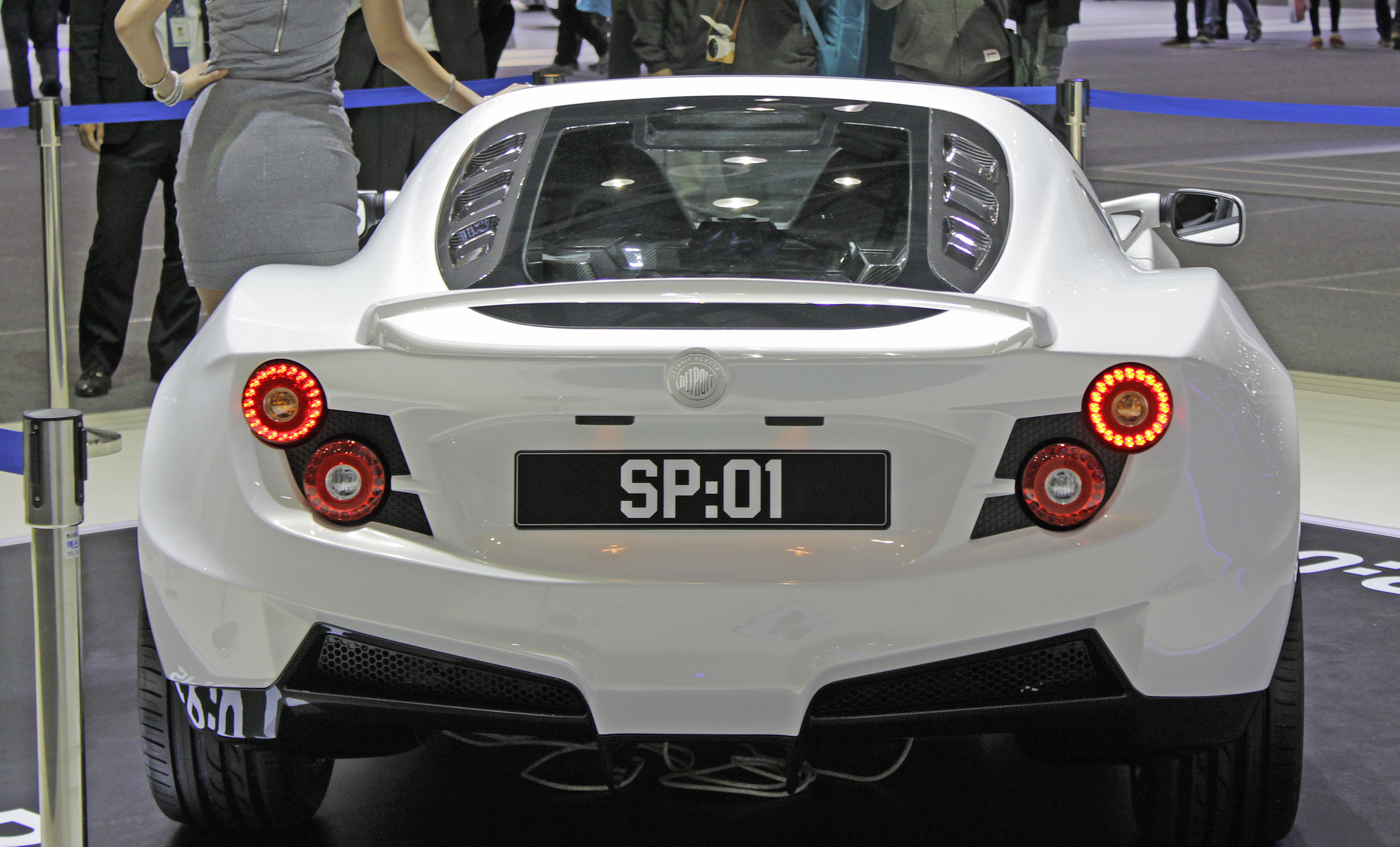
Detroit Electric SP.01 rear

The Detroit Electric SP.01 two-seat all-electric roadster is Detroit Electric's first product and sales were originally scheduled to begin in the United States in August 2013 at a price starting at US$135,000. Production was delayed because, as of August 2013, the company had not been able to secure an agreement for a manufacturing facility. The SP.01, like the Tesla Roadster, was to be built on a Lotus Elise aluminum chassis with carbon fiber body, and production was to be limited to 999 units. The SP.01 prototypes are being assembled in Europe. The commercial version was to have been built at a factory in Wayne County, Michigan, but Detroit Electric announced it would initially be built in the Netherlands. In June 2014 Detroit Electric announced that the SP.01 would be built in Royal Leamington Spa, England, with their Netherlands facility handling the sales and marketing side of the operation.

The SP.01 had a total weight of 2,354 lb (1,068 kg), a 150 kW (200 bhp) electric motor mounted behind the passenger cabin that delivers 225 N⋅m (166 lb⋅ft) of torque. The electric motor drives the rear wheels via a four-speed manual transmission, and a fifth and sixth gear ratios in the gearbox are redundant and available as an option. Top speed is 155 mph (249 km/h) and its time from 0 to 62 mph (0 to 100 km/h) is 3.7 seconds, the same as the Tesla Roadster. The electric car was to have a 37 kWh lithium-polymer battery pack capable of delivering a range of 180 mi (290 km) under the New European Driving Cycle (NEDC) standard. A 7.7 kWh home charging unit would fully charge the car in 4.3 hours, a charging through a standard 13A power source would take 8 hours.

The first production unit was exported to China in February 2016 to be used as a demonstrator. Volume production was planned to begin at the Leamington works later in 2017, as the first of a series of Detroit Electric models.

=== Technology ===
Unique to the SP.01 is its thermal management system, developed in-house by Detroit Electric. As opposed to liquid coolant, Detroit Electric has opted for conditioned air to cool and heat the battery pack as this not only lengthens the battery life, but also makes the entire drive system lighter and safer in the event of a crash. The SP.01 has a telemetry-link to the company's central portal for continuous monitoring of battery and powertrain condition.

An Android application, the Smartphone Application Managed Infotainment (‘SAMI’), was to provide access to all auxiliary functions ranging from a music player, satellite navigation, regenerative braking adjustment and access to vehicle systems status, level of battery charge, range to recharge and other vehicle telemetry. Via GSM, SAMI would also be able to detect the vehicle location.

The SP.01 has bi-directional charging technology ('360 Powerback’) which can detect loss of inflow current and reverse feed to the home circuit. Charging other electric vehicles is also made possible with 360 Powerback (i.e. vehicle to vehicle).

== See also ==
- List of modern production plug-in electric vehicles
- History of the electric vehicle
