= Ding Lei (businessman, born 1963) =

Chinese automotive industry businessman

- 丁磊
- Born: October 1963 (age 62); Ningbo, Zhejiang, China
- Other name: David Ding
- Education: Fudan University (BS, MS); China Europe International Business School (EMBA)
- Occupations: Chairman, CEO and founder, Human Horizons

Ding Lei (Chinese: 丁磊; pinyin: Dīng Lěi; born October 1963; also known as David Ding) is a Chinese automotive industry businessman. He is the founder of Shanghai-based electric vehicle companies Human Horizons (since 2017) and HiPhi (since 2019).

Previously, he served as vice chairman of LeSEE electric car company from 2015 to 2017, deputy district mayor of Pudong New District from 2013 to 2015, and vice president of Shanghai Automotive Group and general manager of Shanghai General Motors from 2007 to 2011.

== Early life and education ==
Born in Ningbo, Zhejiang in October, 1963.

From Fudan University, Ding Lei received a Bachelor of Science with a major in nuclear engineering in 1985 and a Master of Science in solid-state physics in 1988. In 2003, he received an executive Master of Business Administration from China Europe International Business School.

== Career ==
In 1988, Ding Lei joined Shanghai Volkswagen, where he served as an engineer in the Quality Assurance Department. In July 1997, he was appointed as the Deputy Manager of the Quality Assurance Department and the Head of the Quality Engineering Section at Shanghai General Motors. In October 1999, he became the executive director of the Purchasing Department at Shanghai General Motors. By January 2004, he had risen to the position of Deputy Manager of the Technical Quality Department at Shanghai Automotive Industry Corporation. In January 2005, he assumed the role of General Manager at Shanghai General Motors. In November 2007, Ding Lei was appointed as the Vice President of Shanghai Automotive Group and General Manager of Shanghai General Motors.

From 2011 to 2015, Ding joined the Shanghai government departments and served as the Deputy Party Secretary and Executive Deputy Director of Shanghai Zhangjiang Hi-Tech Park Management Committee (from February 2011 to August 2013), and as the deputy district mayor of Pudong New Area (from August 2013 to July 2015).

Since August 2017, Ding has been the Chairman of Human Horizons, as well as East Coast Capital.
