= HiPhi =

Car company

- Native name: 高合
- Type: Private
- Industry: Automotive
- Founded: July 2019; 7 years ago
- Founder: Ding Lei
- Headquarters: Shanghai, China
- Area served: China; Japan
- Key people: Ding Lei (Founder Chairman and CEO); Kevin Chen (COO); James C. Shyr (CDO)
- Number of employees: Approx. 1,500 (2020)
- Parent: EV Electra, Human Horizons
- Website: hiphi.com

HiPhi is an electric vehicle brand owned by EV Electra and Human Horizons. The company was founded by Ding Lei and is headquartered in Shanghai. Its first vehicle, HiPhi X, was released on 31 July 2019.

In February 2024, the company halted production indefinitely;. In May 2025 controversial Lebanese enterprise EV Electra claimed it provided essential investment to restart the production.

== Origin of the name ==
At the 2021 World Internet Conference, HiPhi's founder Ding Lei (1963) talked about the background of the company's founding and said that his original intention of founding HiPhi was "integration and innovation", that is, "high integration", so he used "HiPhi" as the brand name.

== History ==
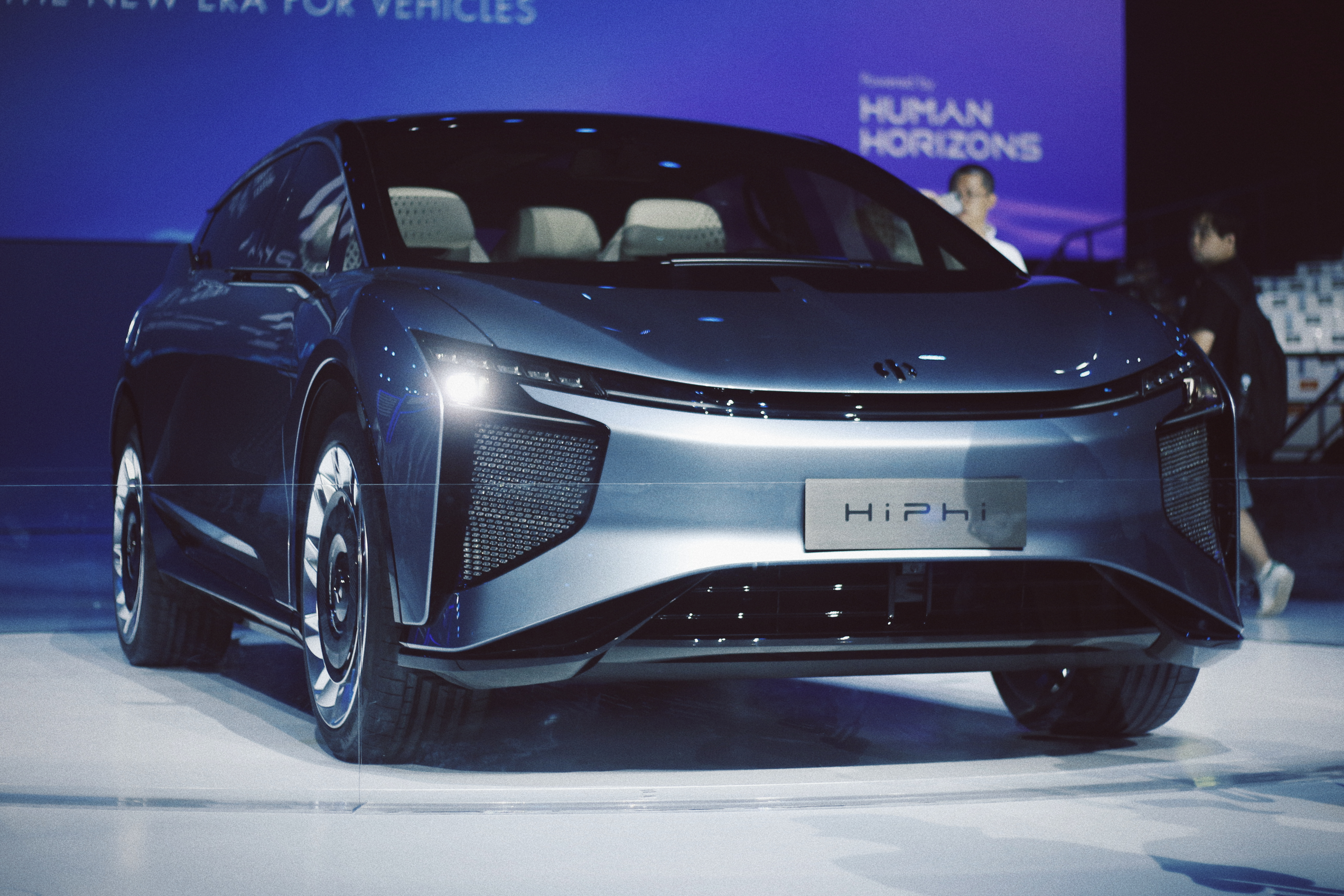
HiPhi 1, the prototype of HiPhi X, HiPhi's first model

Founded in 2017, Human Horizons’ Operations and R&D Center is in Pujiang, Shanghai, China. In 2019 Human Horizons signed a co-operative manufacturing agreement with the Yueda Group, Dongfeng Yueda Kia (DYK) to produce HiPhi's range of vehicles at its manufacturing facility in Yancheng, Jiangsu Province, China.

Its first production car, the HiPhi X, an electric full-sized crossover SUV, went on sale in China in October 2020 with deliveries to customers commencing in May 2021. Its second production model, the HiPhi Z, is a 5-door luxury GT based on the same platform as the HiPhi X. The X was first shown in pre-production form in November 2021, with the production car shown in August 2022 at the Chengdu Motor Show. Customer deliveries commenced early in 2023 after the first production cars rolled off the production line in December 2022.

April 2023 saw HiPhi reveal its third production model, the HiPhi Y. The new medium-sized electric SUV was shown at the Shanghai International Show.

Human Horizons and HiPhi have a Qingdao Headquarters, a Software Center and HiPhi Software Company in Jinjiang District, Chengdu, and an Advanced Technology Research and Design Center in Tokyo, Japan. HiPhi operates a network of ‘HiPhi Hubs’ covering all the major cities in China.

At the 2023 Shanghai International Show during the reveal of the HiPhi Y Human Horizons announced the opening of Operations Centers in both Munich, Germany, and Oslo, Norway, these spearheading the company's introduction into the European marketplace.

On February 18, 2024, HiPhi announced a 6-month suspension of work and production. In May of the same year, some media reported that HiPhi had received support from the American company i Group Inc. and was about to resume work and production.

HiPhi's factory in Yancheng

In May 2025, it was announced that Lebanese Electric vehicle manufacturer EV Electra had invested $100 million in HiPhi and the company would continue manufacturing vehicles immediately. Following the deal, EV Electra would be the majority owner with 69.8% with Human Horizons retaining 30.2%.

== Key people ==
Human Horizons and HiPhi was founded by its chairman and CEO, Ding (David) Lei, a former CEO of Shanghai General Motors and Vice President of SAIC-GM (Shanghai motive Industry Cooperation). Lei highlights the concept of space and time as key influences in the creation of the HiPhi brand. The HiPhi company logo represents space when viewed horizontally from left to right, with the vertical element of the logo characterising time.

Other key people in the Human Horizons leadership team include President Ken Weisman, Chief Technical Officer Mark Stanton, co-Chief Technical Officer Jun Chen, Chief Financial Officer Simon Tang and VP of Design James C. Shyr.

== Early concepts ==
In October 2018, Human Horizons presented a pair of concept vehicles, the HiPhi H (Hypervelocity) and Concept A (Agility). A further concept, named Concept U (Ultimate Mobility) followed in 2019, as did the HiPhi 1 concept – this previewing the HiPhi X production car.

Concept H (Hyper-velocity - 2018) demonstrated a premium sports model with three seats arranged in a 2+1 layout (two in the front with one passenger in the rear) as a result of its teardrop-like aerodynamically efficient body design. Notable technology included four individual wheel hub motors powered by a battery pack which HiPhi claimed gave a potential range of 621 miles (1000 km), The Concept H also featured a reconfigurable cockpit and active wheel air covers to smooth the airflow around the wheels.

Concept A (Active Agility – 2018) is a POD system travel capsule which connects with various travel systems to form different modes of transportation – these include land, rail, monorail, sea and air travel.

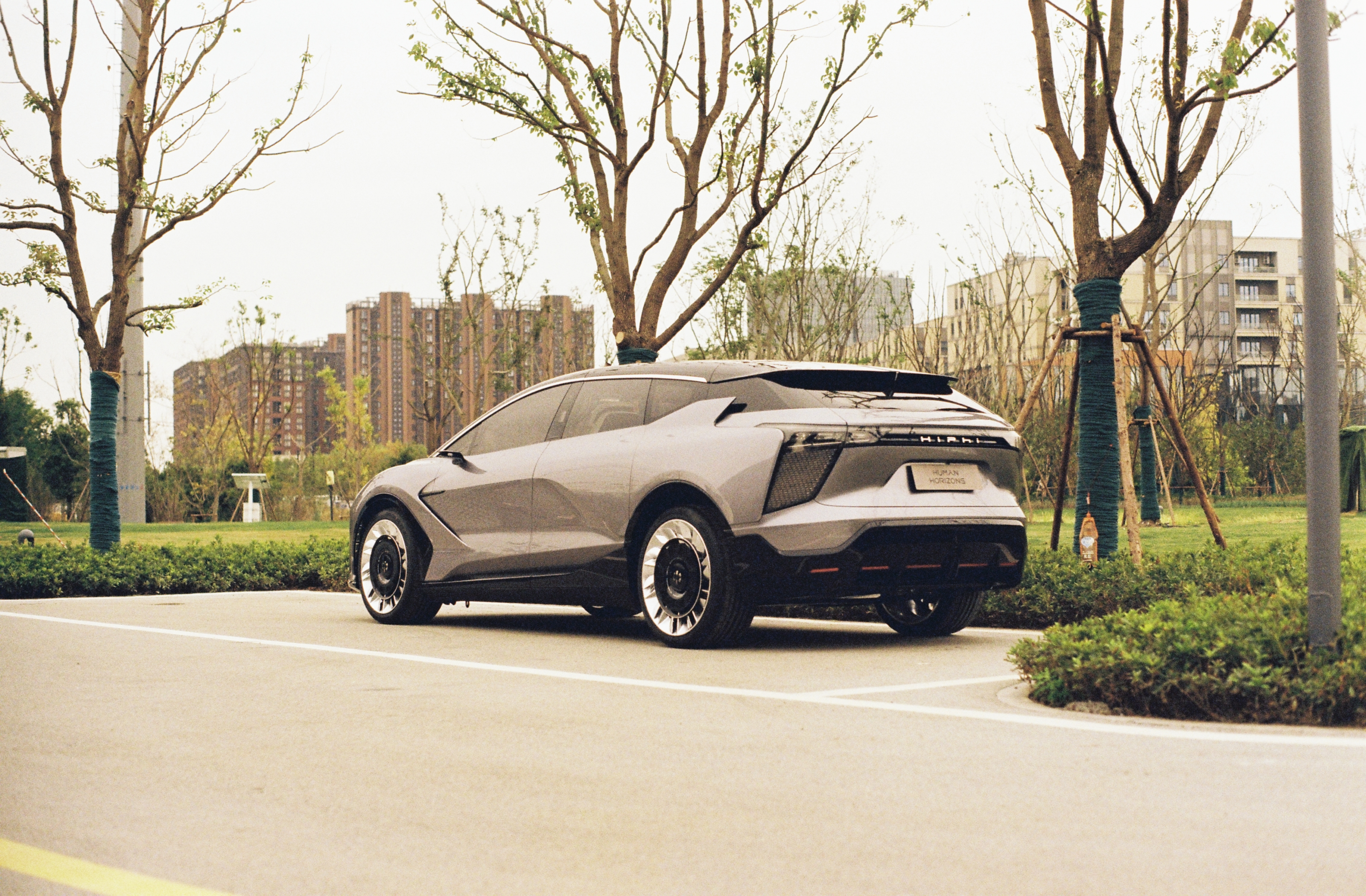
HiPhi Concept 1

Concept U (Ultimate Mobility - 2019) is a larger development of the Concept H, with additional seating.

Human Horizons also demonstrated the potential of its experimental hub motor technology in 2018, showing its engineering vehicle RE05 which uses advanced in-wheel hub motors for propulsion as well as steering.

HiPhi Concept 1 unveiled in July 2019, the HiPhi 1 was essentially a preview of HiPhi's first production model, the HiPhi X.

== Production cars ==
Most of HiPhi's models before the suspension of production were produced at the Yancheng plant with Yueda Kia qualifications; some models were produced by the former BAIC New Energy Laixi plant Body in white, then transported to Yancheng factory for final assembly.

- HiPhi X (2021–2024): Full-size luxury SUV
- HiPhi Z (2023–2024): High-performance luxury sports car
  - HiPhi A: Limited edition luxury sports car based on HiPhi Z
- HiPhi Y (2023–2024): Mid-size SUV
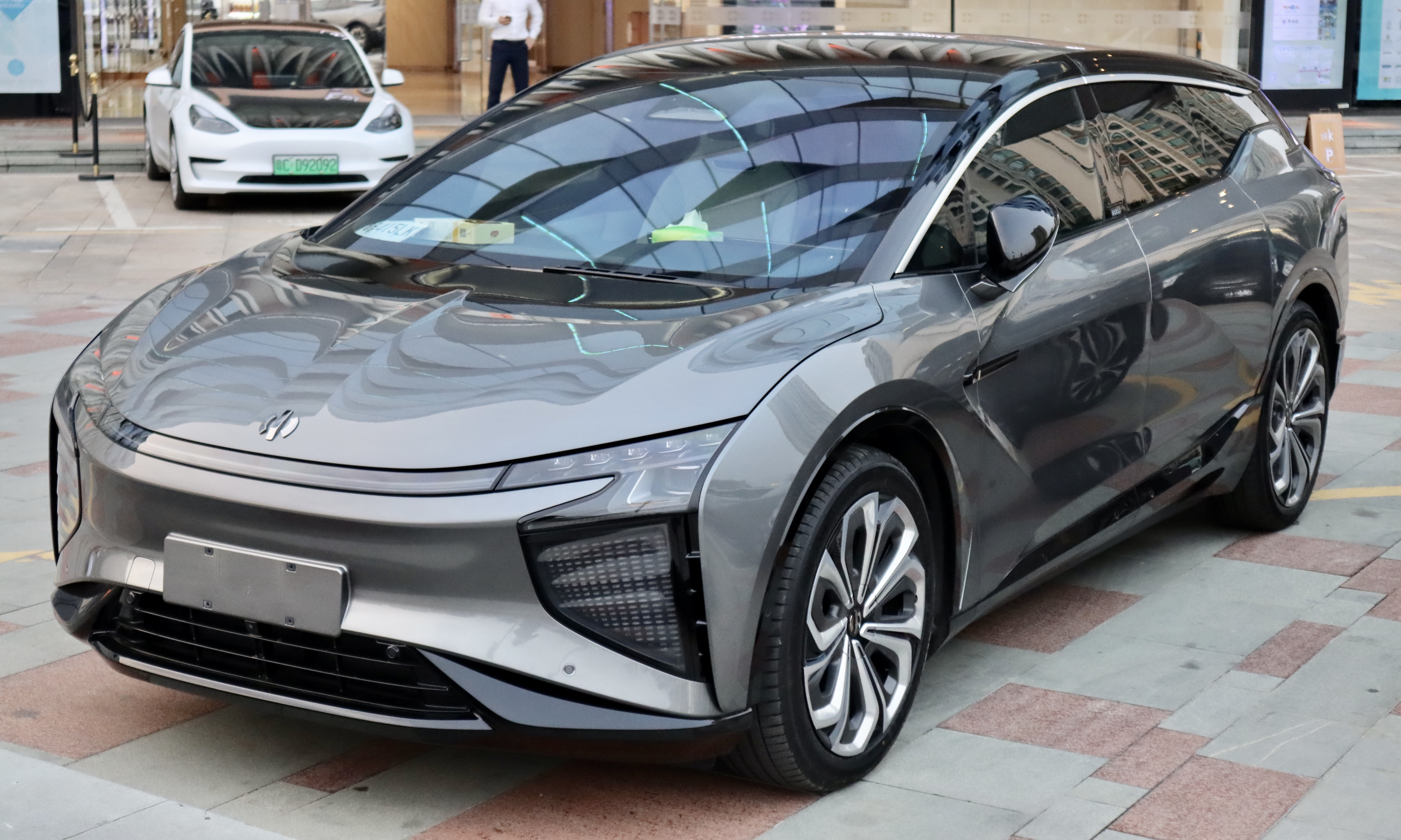
HiPhi X

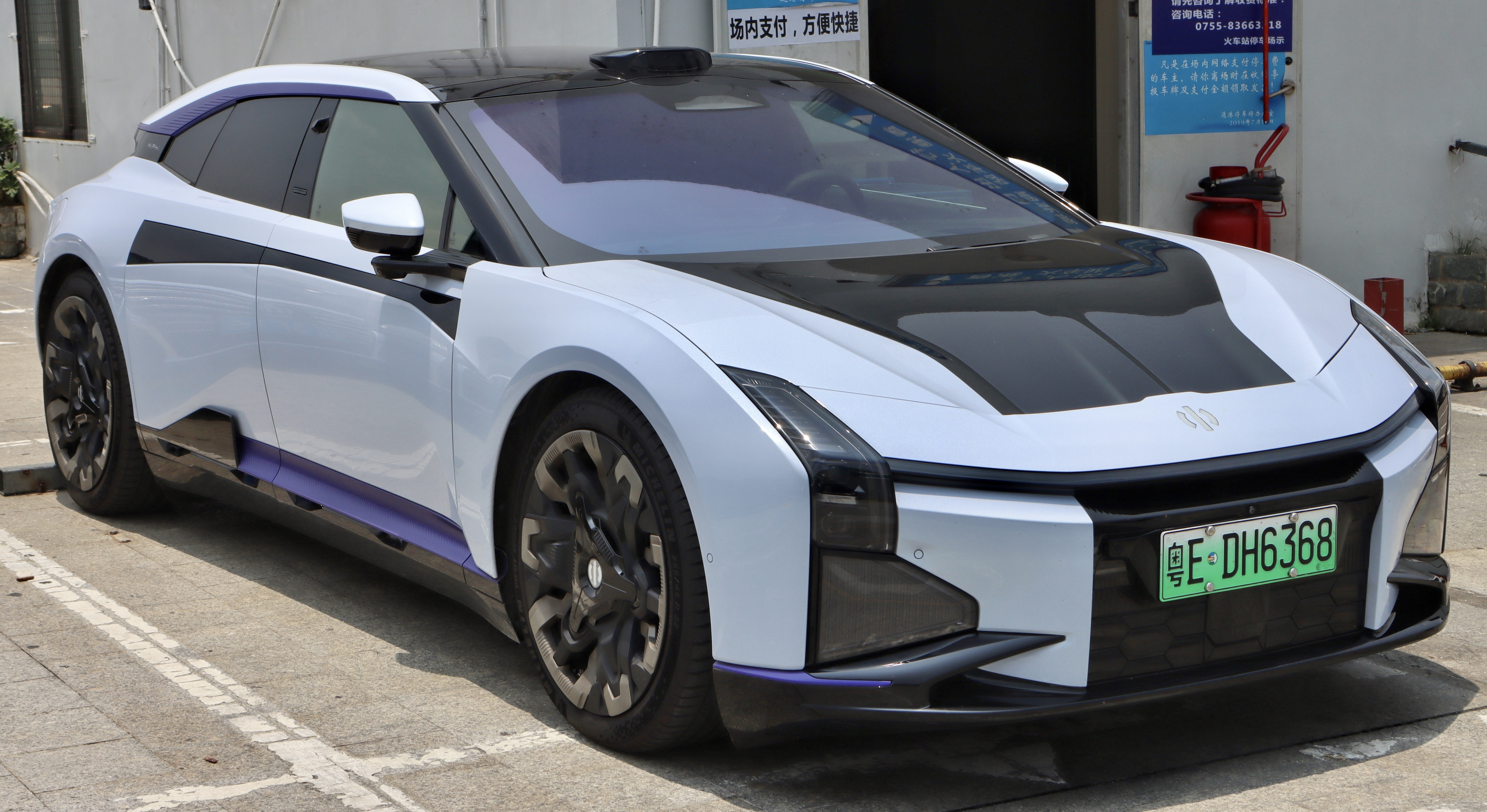
HiPhi Z

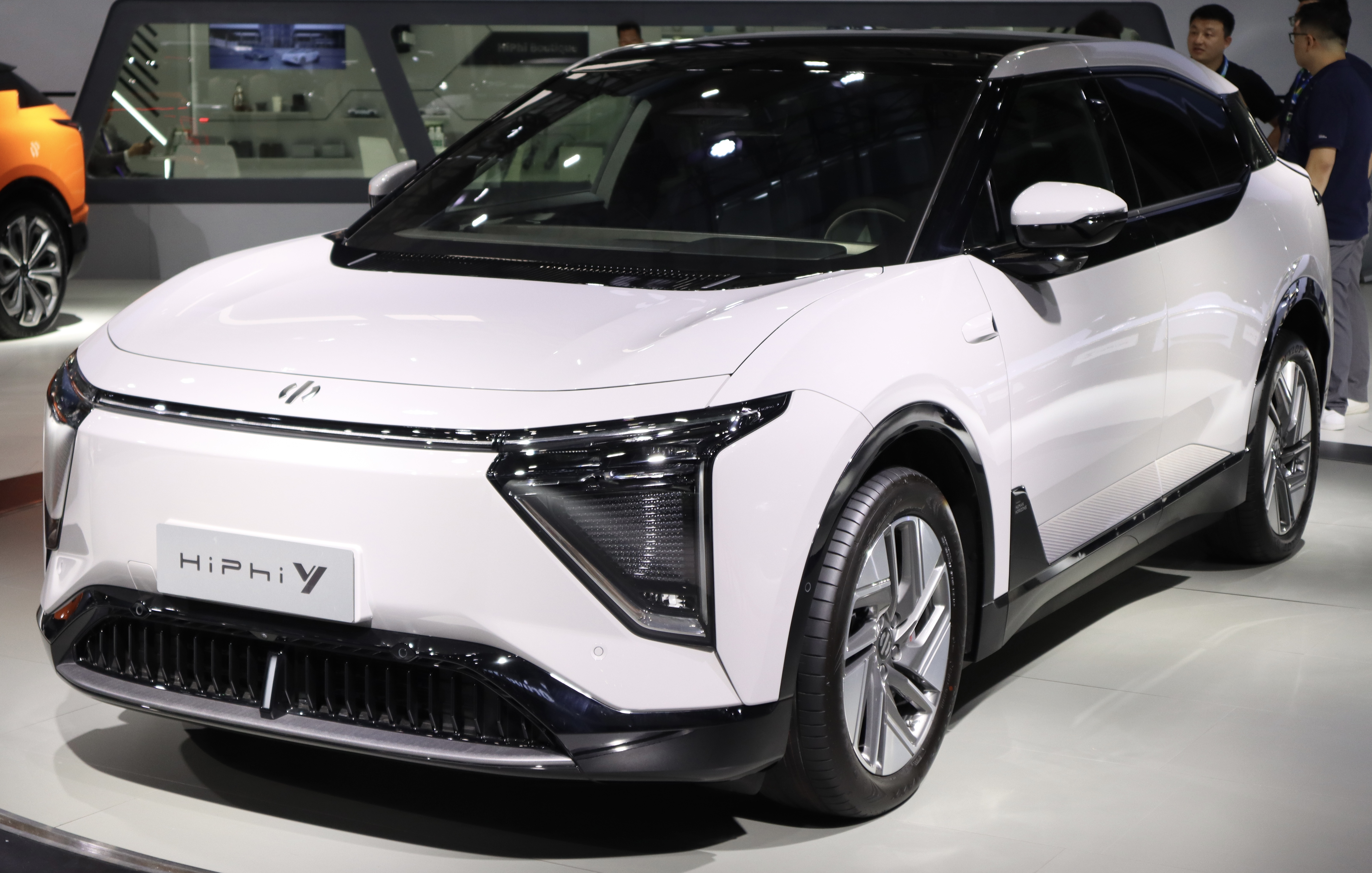
HiPhi Y

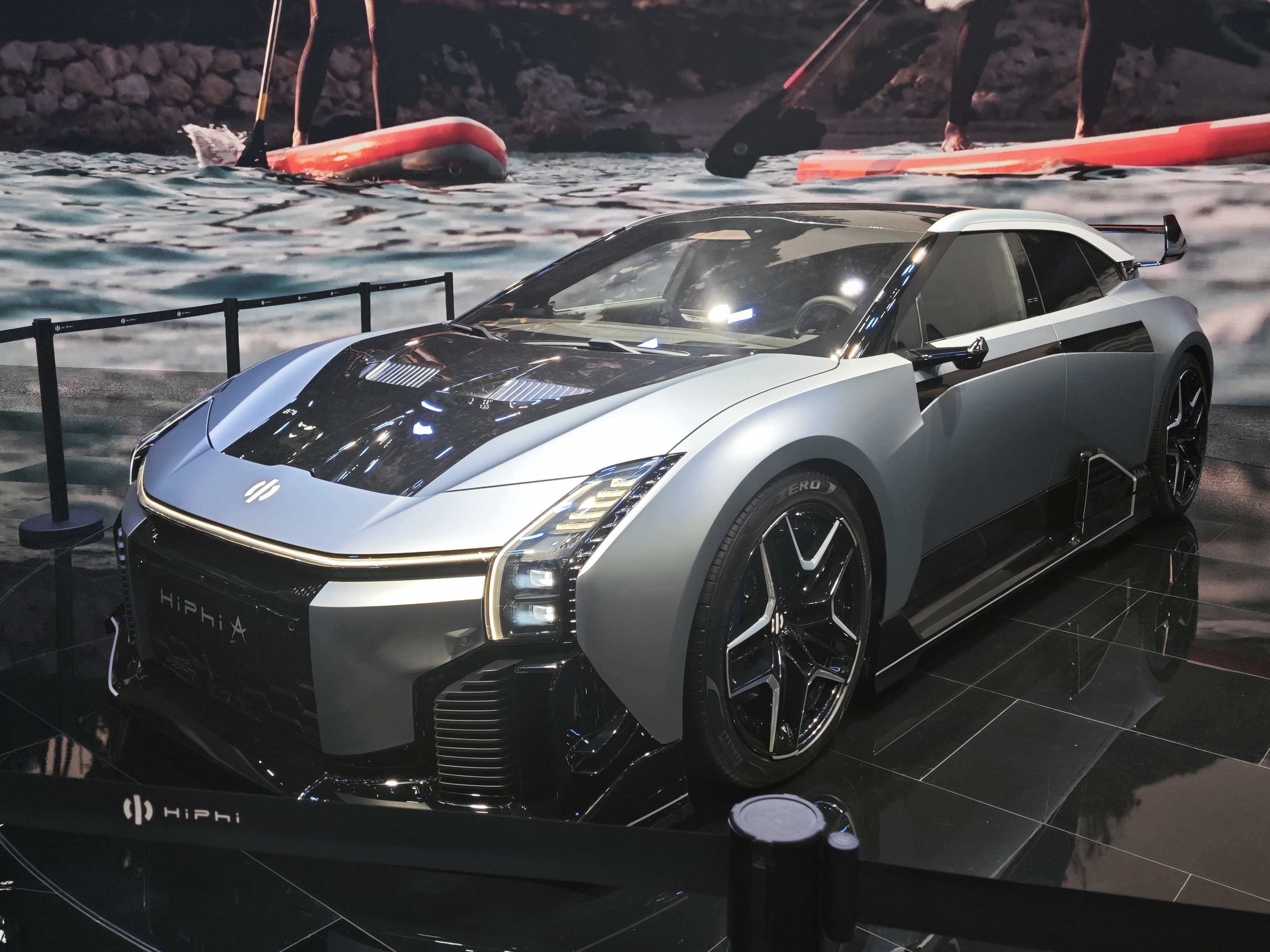
HiPhi A

== Business Crisis ==
On February 7, 2024, HiPhi held an employee meeting and announced that the company would not be able to pay January wages on time, cancel the 2023 year-end bonus, and suggested that employees find their own way out. HiPhi responded that the company is taking measures such as reducing executive salaries and delaying salary payments to cope with internal and external challenges.

On February 18, 2024, the first working day after the Spring Festival holiday, HiPhi mobile held another internal meeting and announced that it would suspend production for 6 months from now on. The media quoted internal employee reports as saying that employees' wages before February 18 will be paid as usual. Employees who remained at HiPhi mobile before March 15 will only be paid 70% of their wages. After March 15, only the local Minimum wage Standard payment will be paid; Employees cannot use their cards to enter the headquarters in Shanghai Pujiang and the factory in Zhenjiang, Jiangsu, A large number of outsourced workers were also laid off. HiPhi only briefly responded to media inquiries, saying that the suspension of work and salary cuts were not true; Caixin Media reported that some local government shareholders asked HiPhi not to disclose the suspension information to the outside world for the time being.

On February 22, 2024, HiPhi's Chairman Ding Lei appeared at the Shanghai headquarters to communicate with some of the remaining employees. He apologized to the employees for the strategic misjudgment that led to the company's suspension of work and production, and said that he would strive for restructuring and cooperation to "revive" the company. HiPhi issued a statement on the same day, admitting that the company has made major adjustments to its daily operations and is currently taking all possible measures to alleviate its difficulties. HiPhi said it will prioritize and strive to ensure user service operations, vehicle after-sales maintenance, and other work, and will work with Yueda Group's subsidiaries to provide vehicle after-sales services; at the same time, it will coordinate resources to maintain HiPhi vehicle after-sales services, maintenance of vehicle networking related functions, and the use of HiPhi App's vehicle control functions and community sections. However, charging-related services and surrounding shopping malls will be temporarily suspended.

After HiPhi announced the suspension of work and production, a large number of its directly-operated stores were closed. Although some dealer franchise stores were open, they were limited to selling inventory vehicles; HiPhi's video account was also changed to Livestreaming with goods. To raise funds needed to maintain after-sales service Some prospective car owners who ordered cars before the Spring Festival were unable to receive cars due to the factory shutdown, but HiPhi was unable to refund the deposits for the cars; some employees also said they had not received their wages for January and February.

According to media reports, HiPhi received $1 billion in financing from i Group Inc on May 16, 2024, and its parent company Human Horizons also signed a comprehensive strategic cooperation agreement with i. HiPhi is expected to resume work and production in the near future. According to public information, the actual controller of i is Yang Rong, Chairman of Hyper-Path Group and founder of Brilliance Group.

In May 2024, HiPhi's parent company Human Horizons Holdings (Shanghai) Co., Ltd. was listed as a "dishonest person subject to enforcement", and Ding Lei was repeatedly restricted from high consumption; several affiliated companies of Human Horizons were also included in the list of abnormal operations. On August 8 of the same year, the People's Court of Yancheng Economic Development Zone accepted the bankruptcy pre-reorganization application filed by Human Horizons (Jiangsu) Technology Co., Ltd.

On August 19, 2024, six months after the previous suspension of work and production, HiPhi announced that it would gradually resume the supply of spare parts to after-sales service centers and cooperative outlets, and authorized Yueda's subsidiaries to purchase HiPhi auto parts to support after-sales service.

== Sales ==
HiPhi sales data
Year	Total
2021	4,237
2022	4,394
2023	8,681
2024	304
