= EV Electra =

Lebanese auto manufacturer

- Industry: Automotive
- Founded: 2017; 6 years ago
- Founder: Jihad Mohammad
- Headquarters: Khalde, Lebanon
- Products: Automobiles
- Number of employees: 300
- Website: www.evelectra.com

EV Electra is a Lebanese start-up working in the manufacture of electric vehicles in Lebanon and the Middle East. The company emerged from Jihad Mohammad Investments Company to be an independent company with branches in Canada, Italy, Germany and the Netherlands, with the company's headquarters being based in Khalde, Lebanon. EV Electra has established a centre dedicated to research and development in the field of electric vehicles, the first example of such an office in the Middle East.

== History ==
=== Founding ===
EV Electra was established in 2017 by Lebanese-born Canadian-Palestinian businessman Jihad Mohammad, who acts as the chairman and CEO of the company. The company has about 300 employees.

In 2020, EV Electra announced plans to reveal the 'Quds Rise', a two seater, electric sports car reportedly capable of reaching 165 km/h, with a maximum range of 400 km between charges. The unveiling of the car was delayed to 2021, however, due to the COVID-19 pandemic. The car was subsequently revealed in Beirut, with deliveries expected to begin in late 2021, and the car being priced at approximately $30,000. Production never materialised. The car was unveiled during the Lebanese economic crisis, in which imported car sales hit a record low. The name 'Quds' is derived from the Arabic name for Jerusalem; Al Quds. The company later revealed plans to set up 100 recharging stations around Lebanon, connected to generators.

EV Electra subsequently revealed the Quds Capital ES electric sedan, alongside various other renderings of concept vehicles.

=== Acquisition of Detroit Electric ===
In November 2021, EV Electra acquired a majority stake in Detroit Electric, a car company founded in 2008 by Albert Lam, and named after the car of the same name produced by the Anderson Electric Car Company from 1907-1939. The investment was intended to allow Detroit Electric to "expand its operations in Europe and Asia, with the aim of producing several EV and hydrogen electric hybrid models over the next five years."

=== Cancelled deal with NEVS ===
In December 2023, Jihad Mohammad announced that EV Electra had purchased the rights to the NEVS Emily GT and PONS Robotaxi projects. A joint statement with NEVS revealed that EV Electra would soon begin to produce cars in Turkey, with Mohammad adding that cars will soon be produced at the Swedish Trollhättan Assembly again. Despite this, EV Electra failed to secure a development site in Trollhättan, instead purchasing a factory in Italy, leading to NEVS cancelling the agreement and proceeding with the project independently.

=== HiPhi ===
In May 2025, EV Electra acquired a majority stake in Chinese electric vehicle manufacturer HiPhi for $100 million. EV Electra now owns 69.8% of the car brand.
