= HiPhi Z =

Battery electric shooting brake

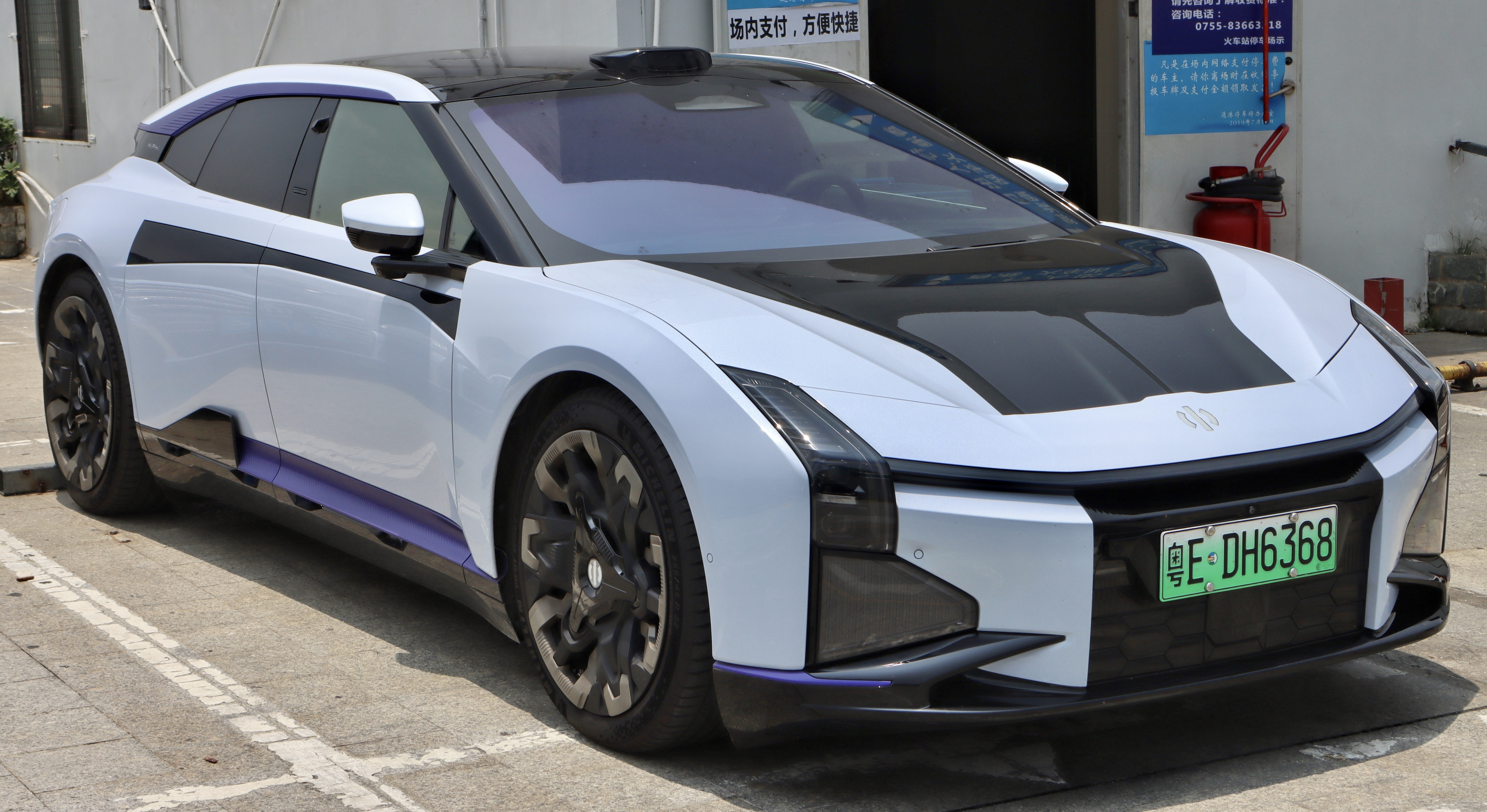

Overview
- Manufacturer: HiPhi
- Production: December 2022–2024
- Model years: 2022–2024
- Assembly: China: Yancheng (DYK)
- Designer: Zhang Shaolei (exterior); Yao Yu-Cheng (interior)

Body and chassis
- Class: Executive car (E)
- Body style: 5-door shooting brake
- Layout: Dual-motor, four-wheel drive
- Doors: Conventional (Front); Suicide doors (Rear)
- Related: HiPhi X

Powertrain
- Electric motor: Permanent magnet synchronous motor
- Transmission: 1-speed fixed gear
- Battery: 120 kWh lithium-ion
- Electric range: 550 km (342 mi)

Dimensions
- Wheelbase: 3,150 mm (124.0 in)
- Length: 5,036 mm (198.3 in)
- Width: 2,018 mm (79.4 in)
- Height: 1,439 mm (56.7 in)
- Kerb weight: 2,950 kg (6,504 lb)

The HiPhi Z is a battery electric five-door shooting brake car from Chinese car manufacturer HiPhi. The vehicle was first presented as a concept in China in November 2021. The car is sold alongside the HiPhi X, an SUV that shares much of its electric platform with the HiPhi Z.

== History ==
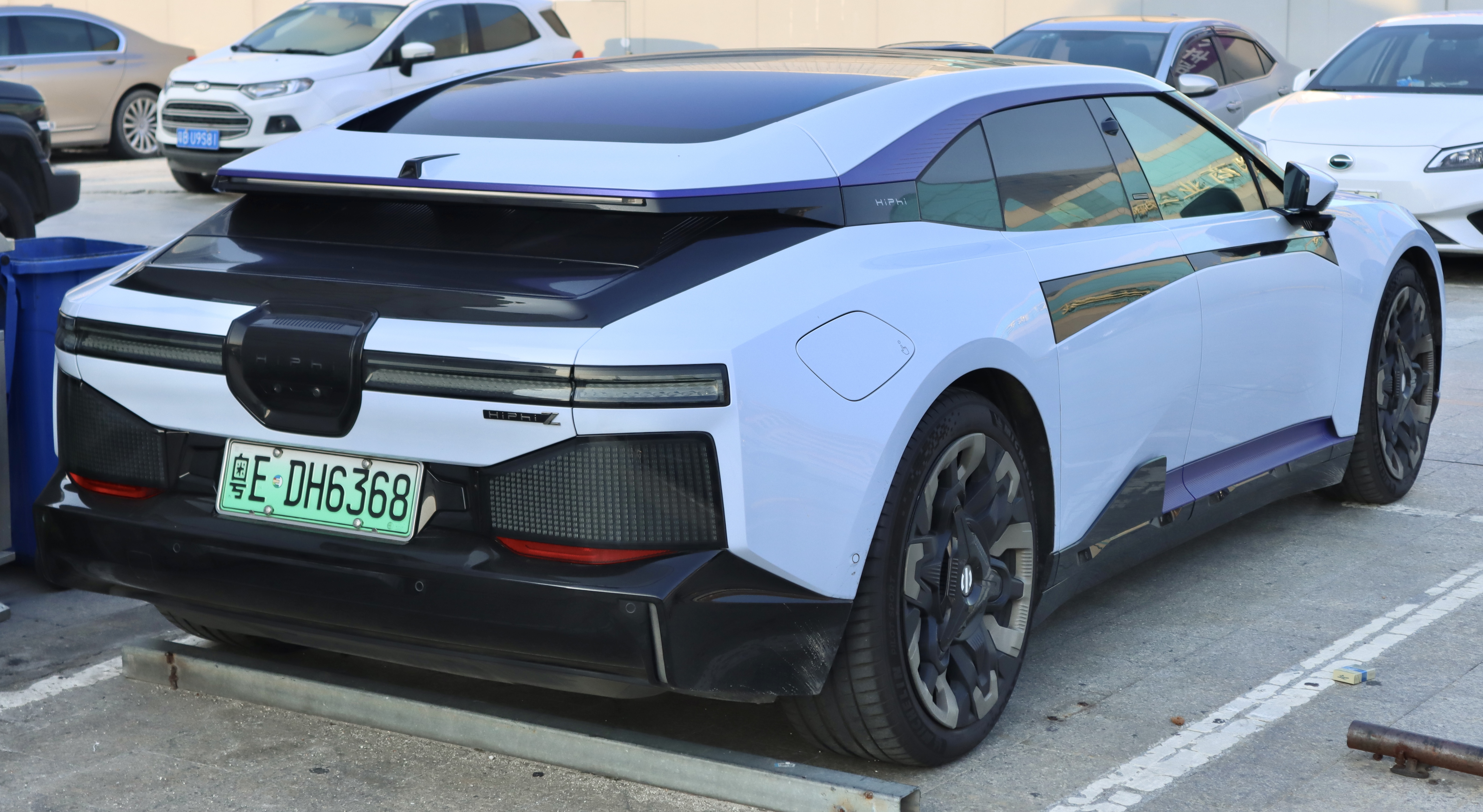
HiPhi Z rear

The HiPhi Z was first revealed to the public in Shanghai in November 2021 in pre-production form and was officially launched in the summer of 2022 at the Chengdu Motor Show, China.

Customer deliveries commenced from 2023 in China, with a planned expansion into Europe. The production car is built alongside the HiPhi X at the Dongfeng Yueda Kia (DYK) plant in Yancheng Province, China, as part of an arrangement between Human Horizons and the Yueda Group.

== Interior and technology ==
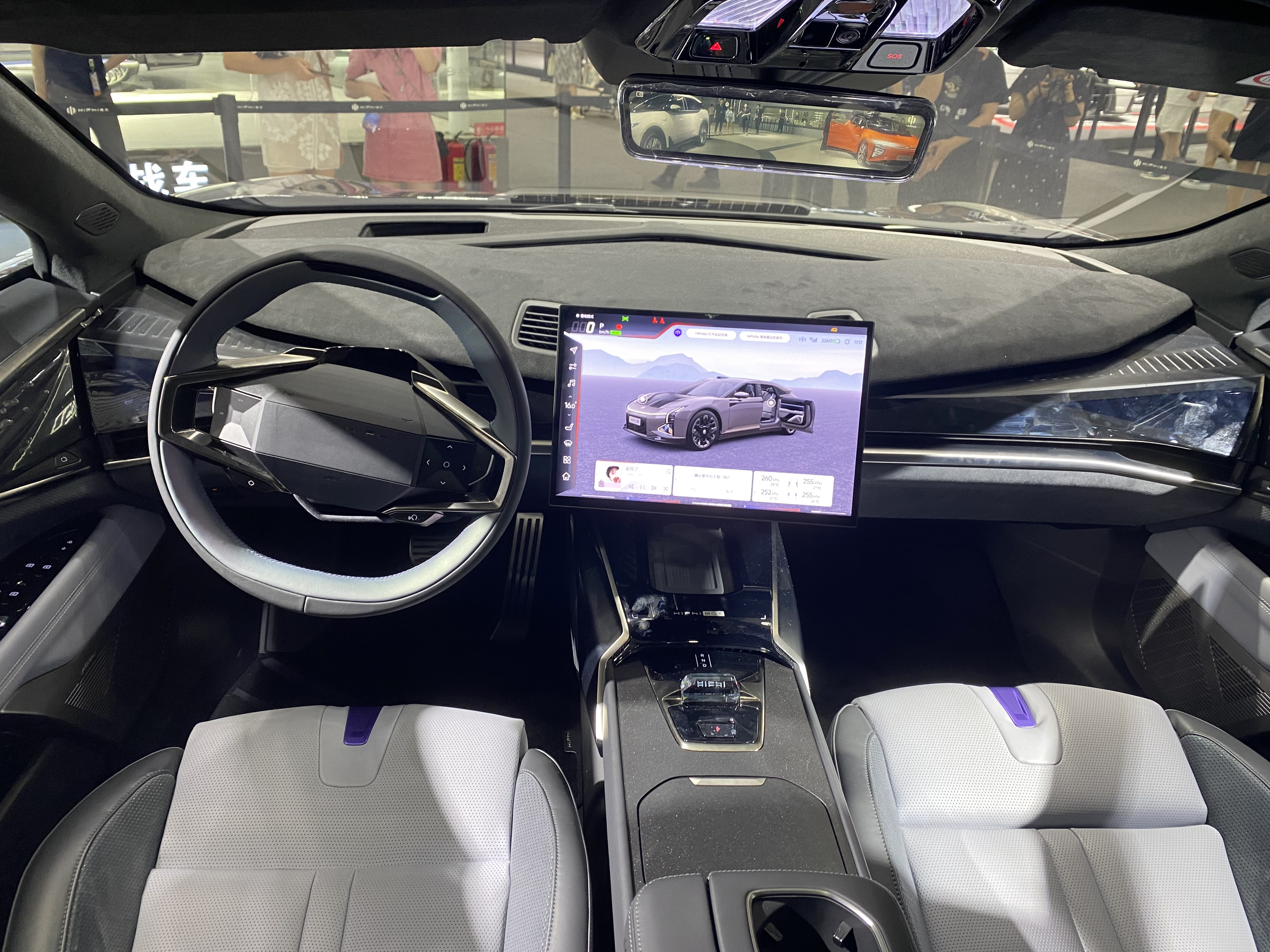
Interior

Like the HiPhi X, the HiPhi Z can communicate with its surroundings via its PML ("Programmable Matrix Lighting") system, with the HiPhi Z adding the "Star Ring" ISD ("Intelligent Signal Display"), which allows messages and graphics to feature on the Z's doors, using 4000 LEDs.

A touchscreen is situated in the center of the dashboard, between the driver and passenger. This screen is mounted on a robotic multi-axis arm which moves automatically to orientate itself with the driver.

== HiPhi A ==
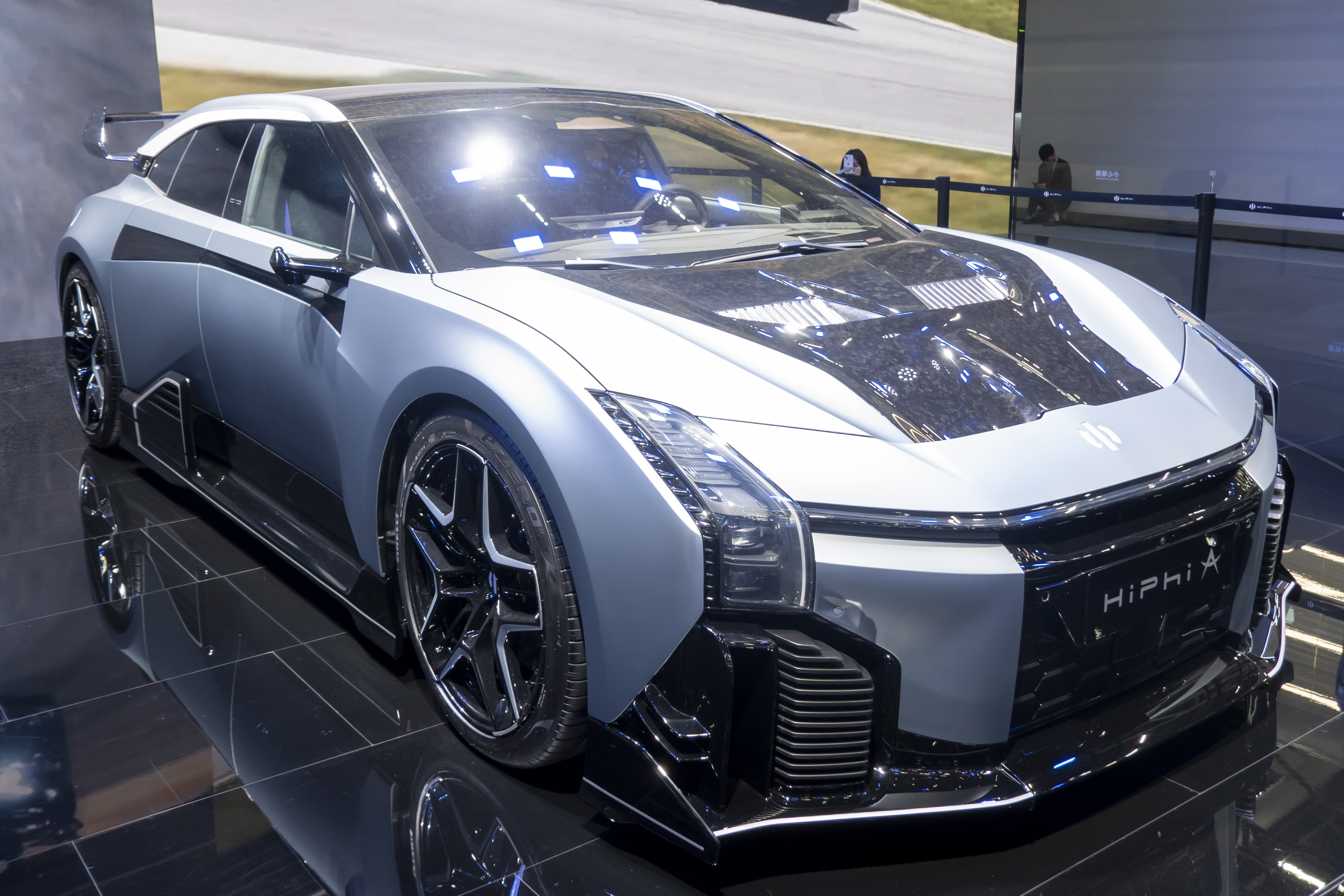
HiPhi A

The HiPhi A is the upgraded version of the HiPhi Z in collaboration with Apollo Automobil, and debuted at Auto Guangzhou 2023 with plans to start deliveries in 2025. Originally rumored to be the HiPhi Z GT, the vehicle is based on the HiPhi Z, and features a widebody kit and large spoilers with enhanced air intakes. The A stands for Apollo and Accelerator.

== Sales ==
Year	China
2023	2,296
2024	116
2025	9
