= HiPhi X =

Battery electric full-size crossover SUV

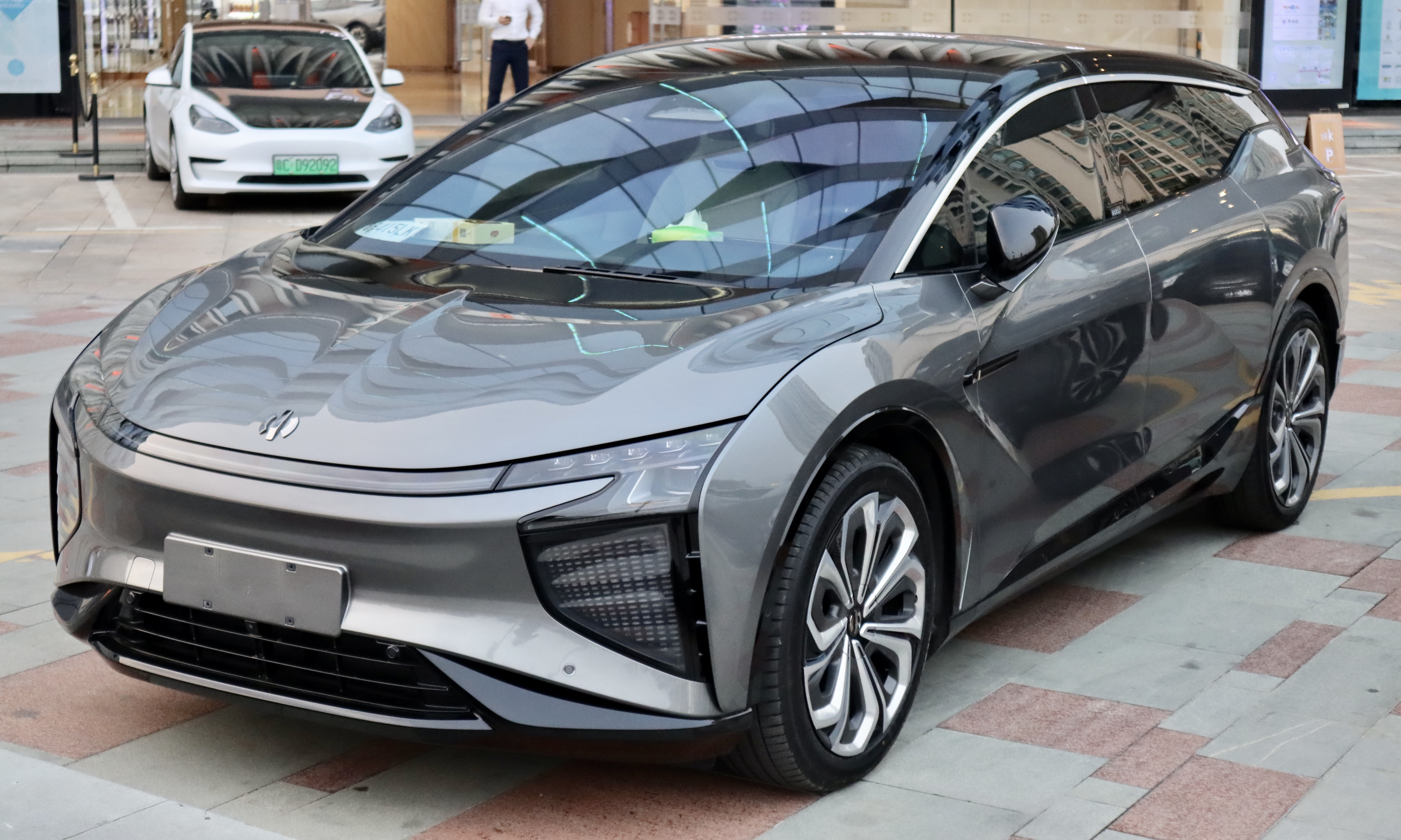

Overview
- Manufacturer: HiPhi
- Also called: HiPhi 1 (concept)
- Production: 2020–2024
- Model years: 2021–2024
- Assembly: China: Yancheng (Dongfeng Yueda Kia / Yueda Kia)
- Designer: Yao Yu-Cheng (2017); Huang Po-Yuan, An Wen, Li Yi-Lin (2018); Huang Hao (interior designer); James C. Shyr

Body and chassis
- Class: Full-size luxury crossover SUV
- Body style: 5-door SUV
- Layout: Dual-motor, four-wheel drive
- Doors: Conventional (Front); wing doors (Falcon coach) (Rear)

Powertrain
- Electric motor: Permanent magnet synchronous motor
- Transmission: 1-speed fixed gear
- Battery: 97 kWh lithium-ion
- Electric range: 550 km (342 mi)

Dimensions
- Wheelbase: 3,150 mm (124.0 in)
- Length: 5,200 mm (204.7 in)
- Width: 2,062 mm (81.2 in)
- Height: 1,618 mm (63.7 in)
- Kerb weight: 2,500 kg (5,512 lb)

The HiPhi X is a battery electric full-sized luxury SUV produced by Human Horizons under the HiPhi brand. It is available in either four or six-seater configurations.

== Overview ==
The HiPhi X is the company's first production car, produced from September 2020, with customer deliveries starting shortly after. The HiPhi X is built in Yancheng, Jiangsu Province, China, at the Dongfeng Yueda Kia (DYK) plant as part of a collaborative agreement between the Yueda Group and Human Horizons.

HiPhi first revealed the HiPhi 1 in July 2019, and this pre-production concept would become the HiPhi X.

Since its introduction the HiPhi X has established itself as China's best-selling luxury EV, with over 5000 having been delivered to customers by January 2022. It is the first domestically produced EV to achieve the top sales spot in the premium EV marketplace in China outselling the imported models like the Porsche Taycan, Mercedes-Benz EQC and Audi e-tron

The HiPhi X is priced from RMB ¥570,000 ($82,190) - RMB ¥800,000 ($121,000) it comes in four trim levels including Performance, Luxury, Flagship and the super luxurious four-seater model – which features a specification similar to the Founders Edition offered to early buyers.

=== HiPhi 1 Concept ===
The HiPhi 1 pre-production Concept was publicly unveiled on 31 July 2019 as the production-ready prototype for the HiPhi X production model, which was revealed in September 2020.

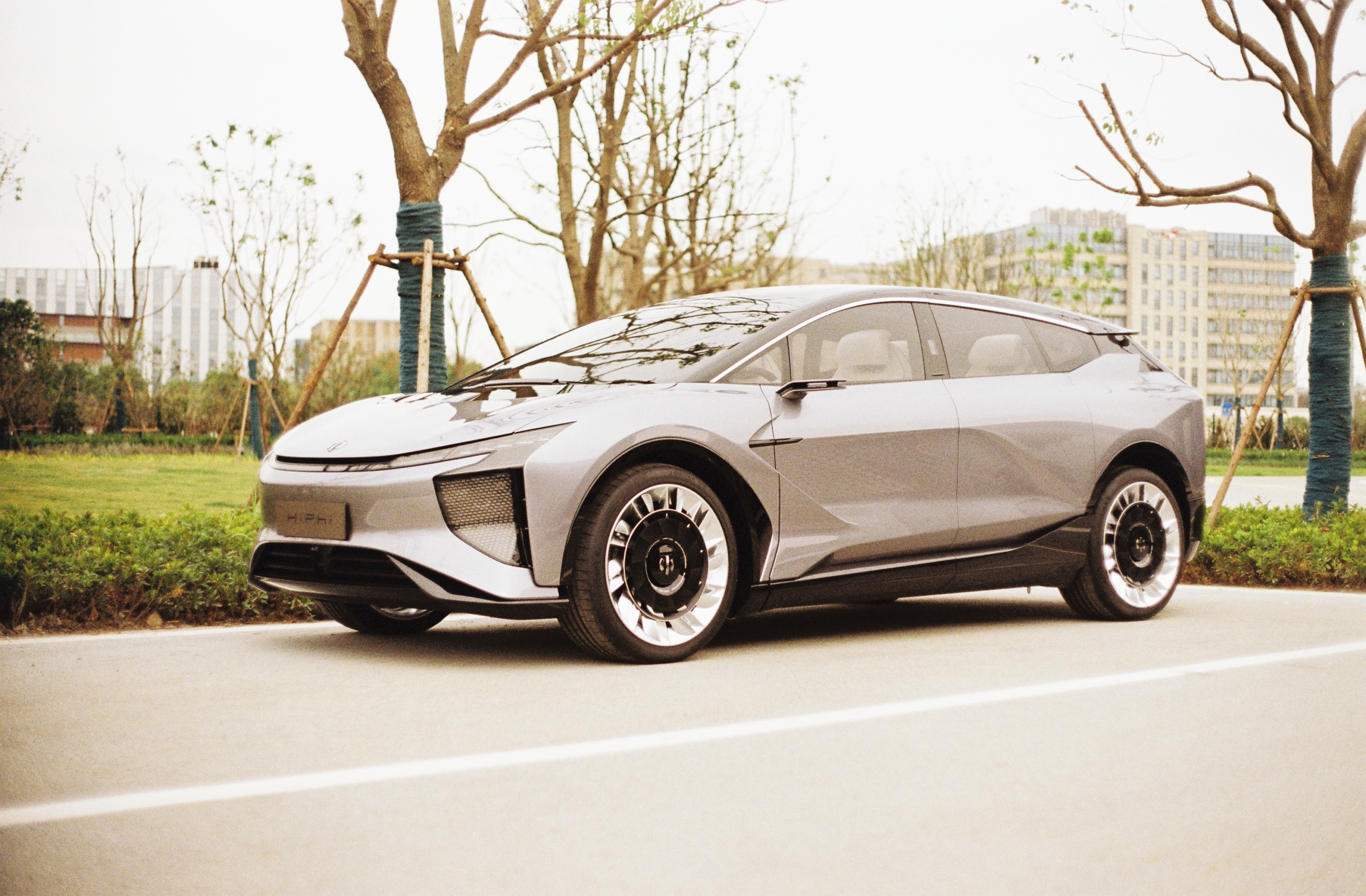
HiPhi 1 Concept front

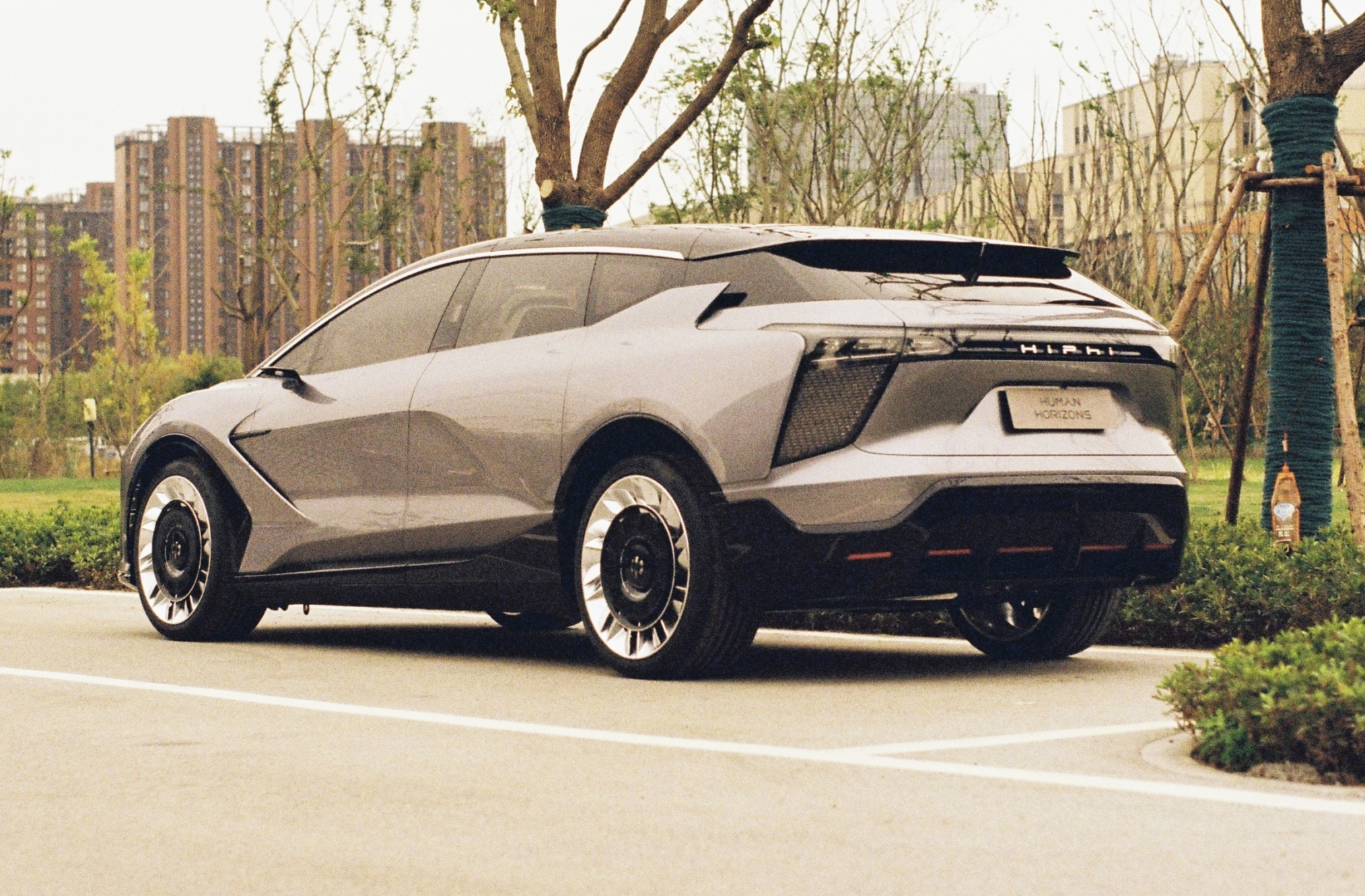
HiPhi 1 Concept rear

=== Founders Edition ===
The Founders Edition was the initial version to be launched, which featured limited edition badges and exclusive low profile golden trim parts. Depending on the 6-seater people carrier or 4-seater limousine models, the price is RMB ¥680,000 ($103,000) - RMB ¥800,000 ($121,000).

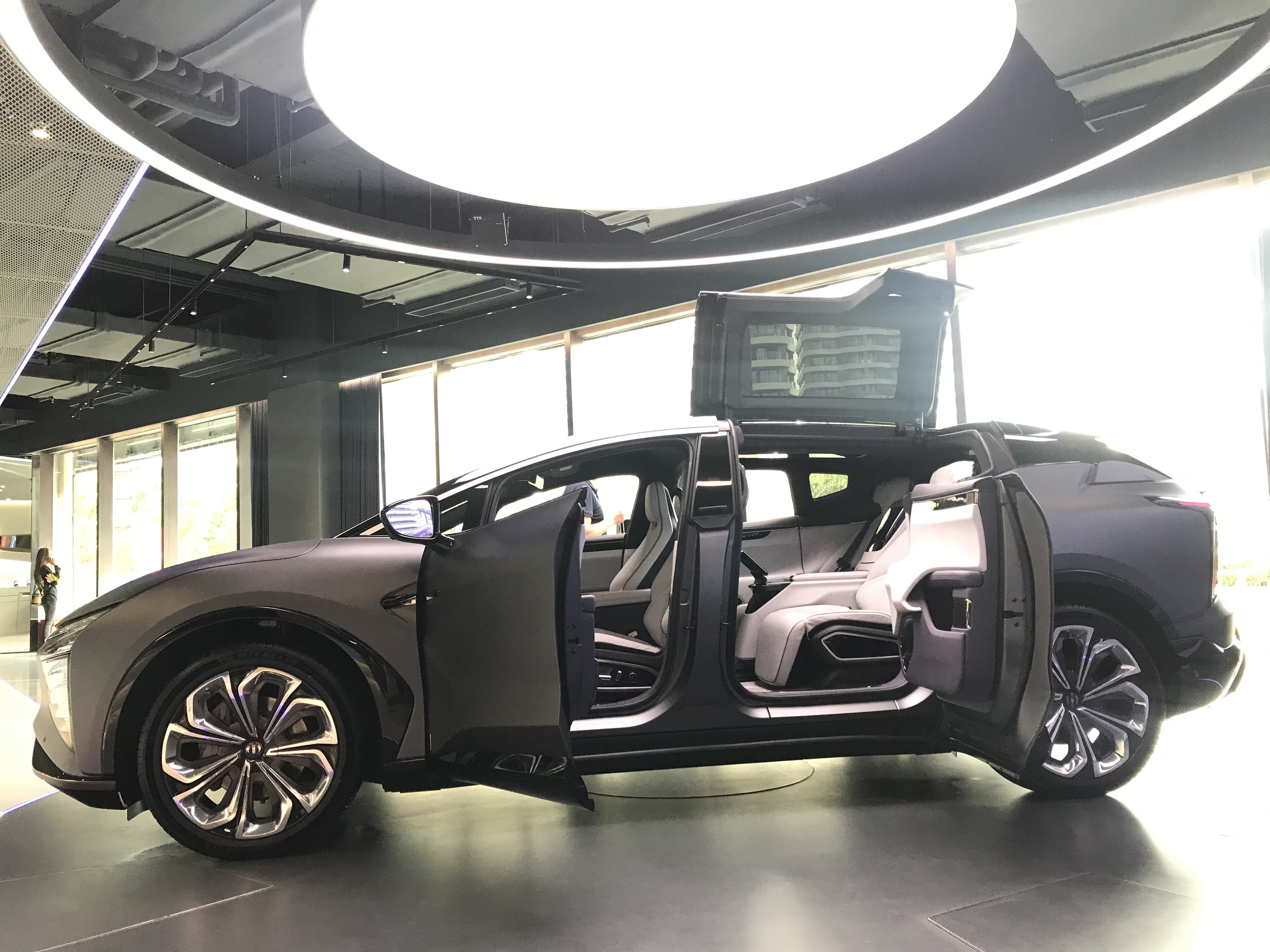
HiPhi X Founders Edition door open

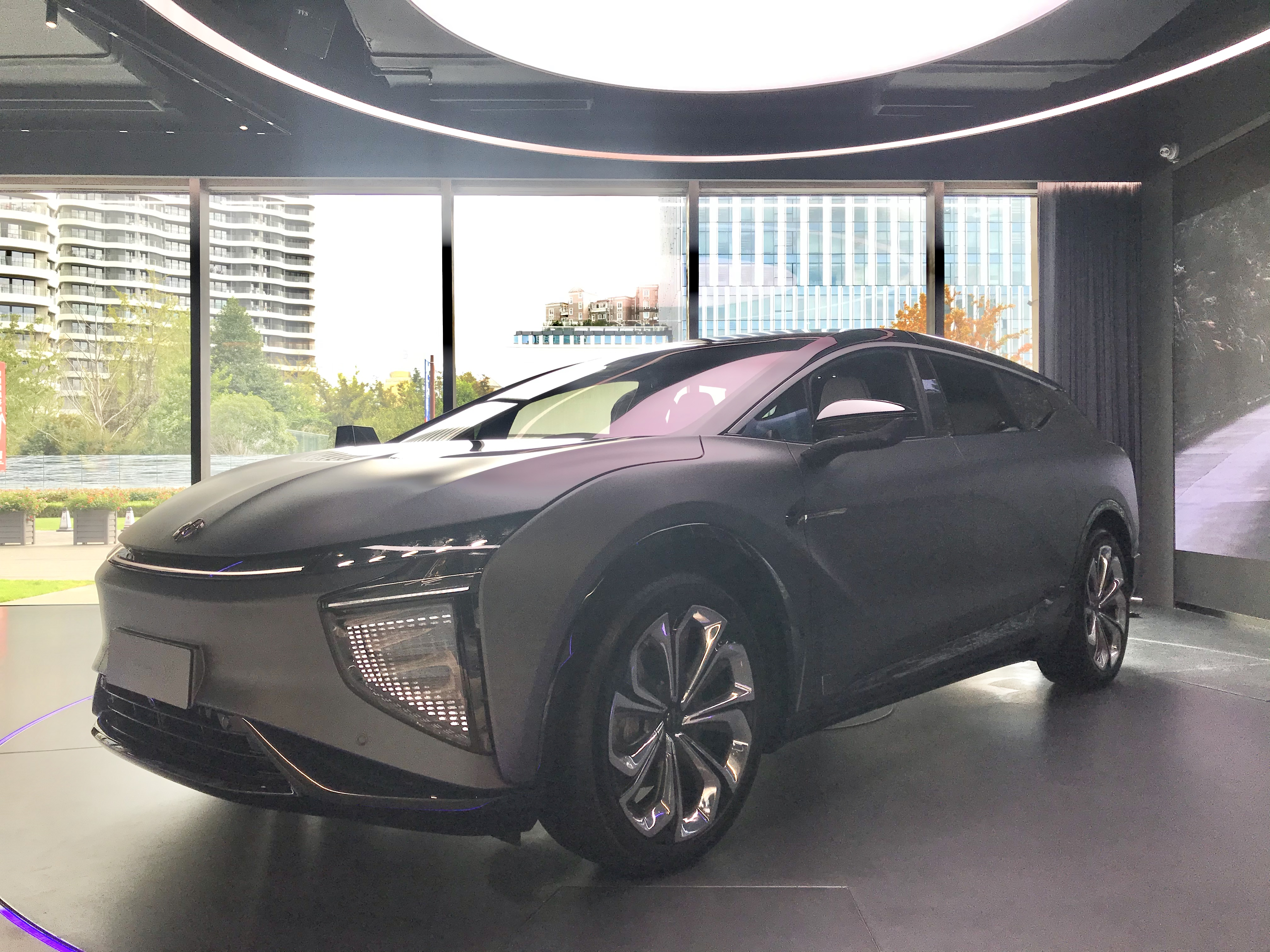
HiPhi X Founders Edition front

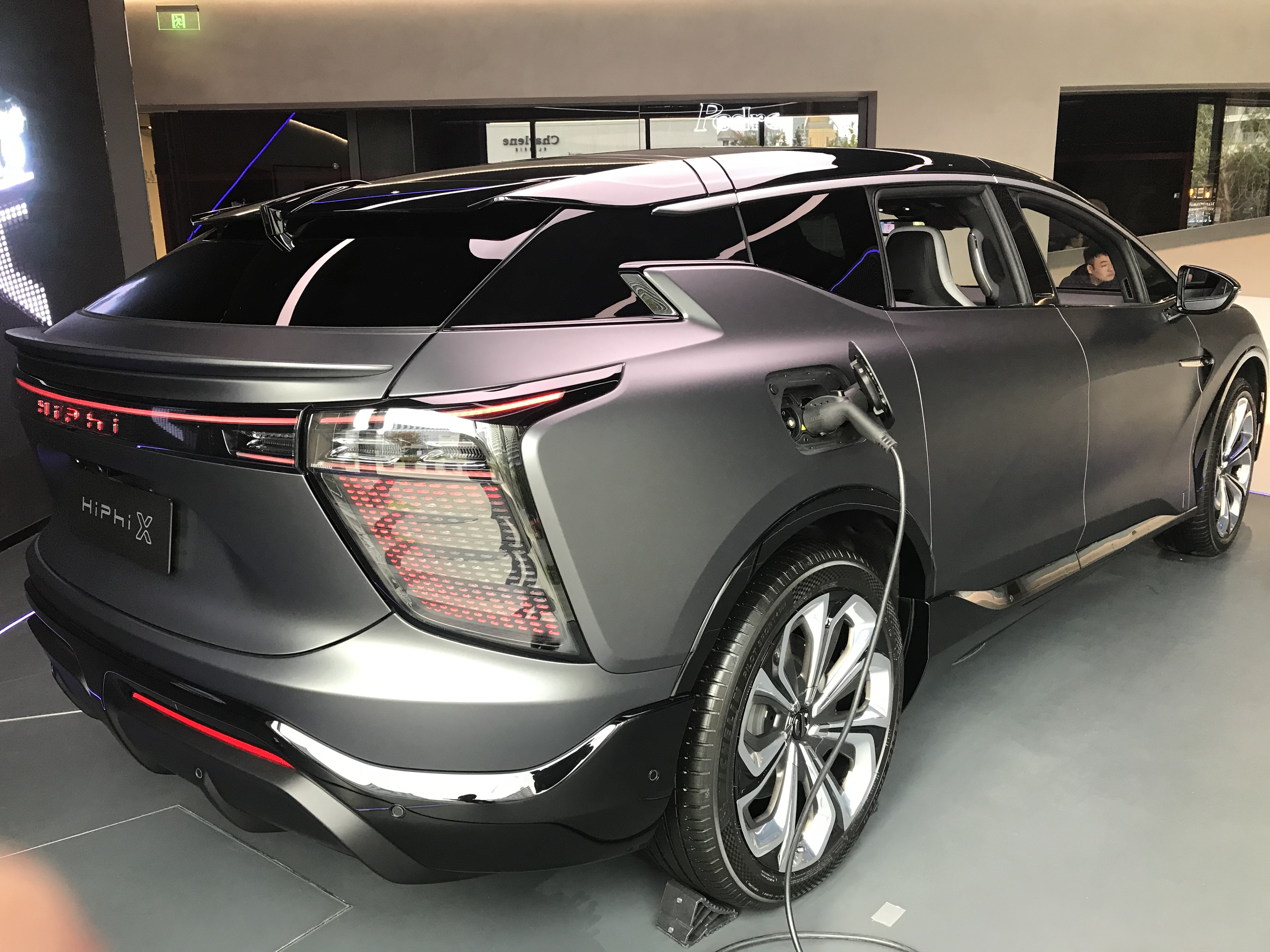
HiPhi X Founders Edition rear

=== Production version ===
The HiPhi X uses split rear doors with suicide doors paired with overhead gull-wing doors on the top section of the doors, making it a 6-door crossover excluding the hatchback. HiPhi refers to this setup as "NT Doors". The HiPhi X is powered by a Bosch electric motor with a single-speed reduction gear producing 268 hp (200 kW; 272 PS) powering the rear wheels, with dual-motor all-wheel-drive models also available with a combined output of 536 hp (400 kW; 543 PS). The battery of the HiPhi X is a 96 kWh battery pack capable of a range up to 400 miles (644 km), according to HiPhi.

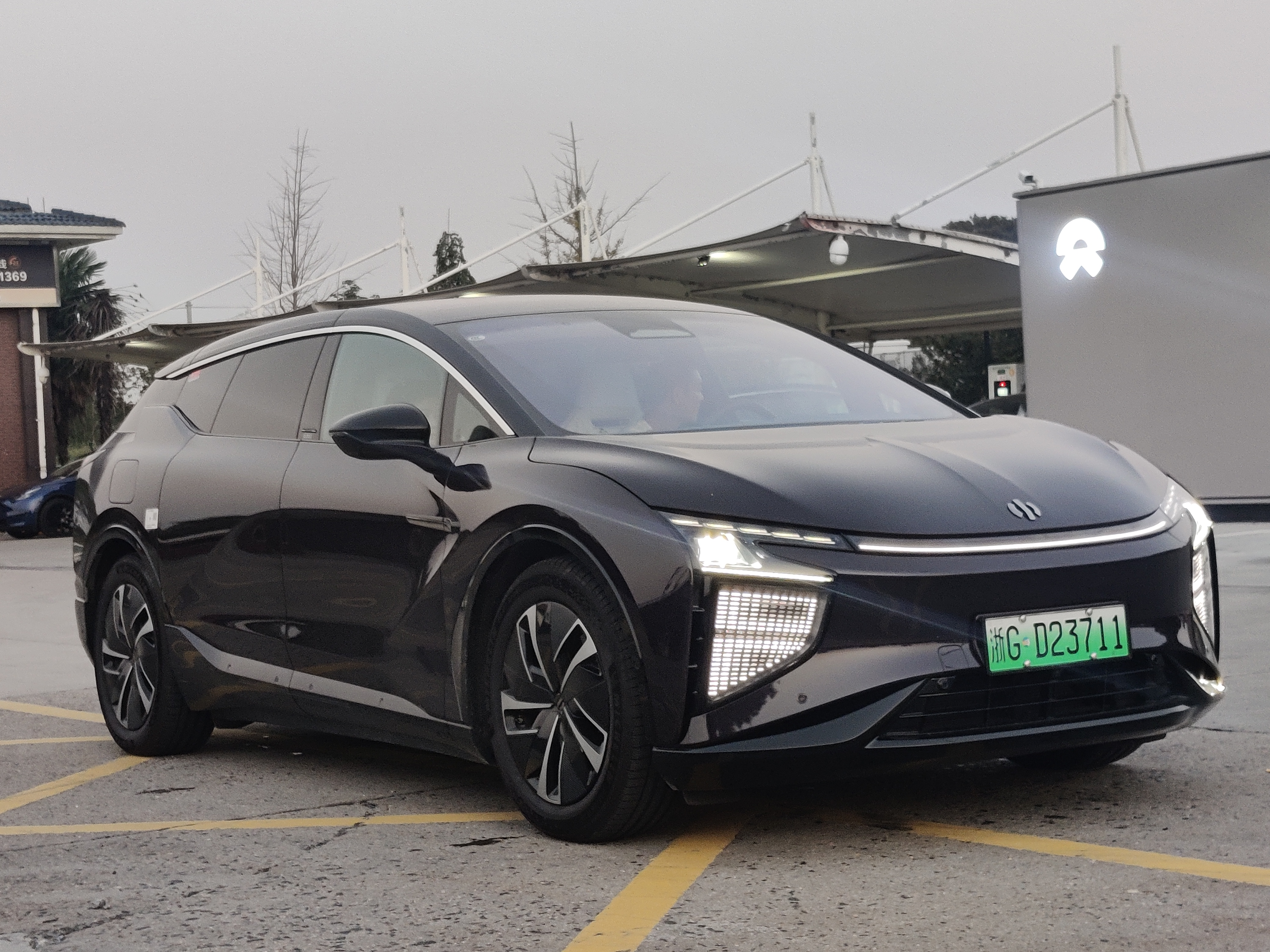
Production version of HiPhi X

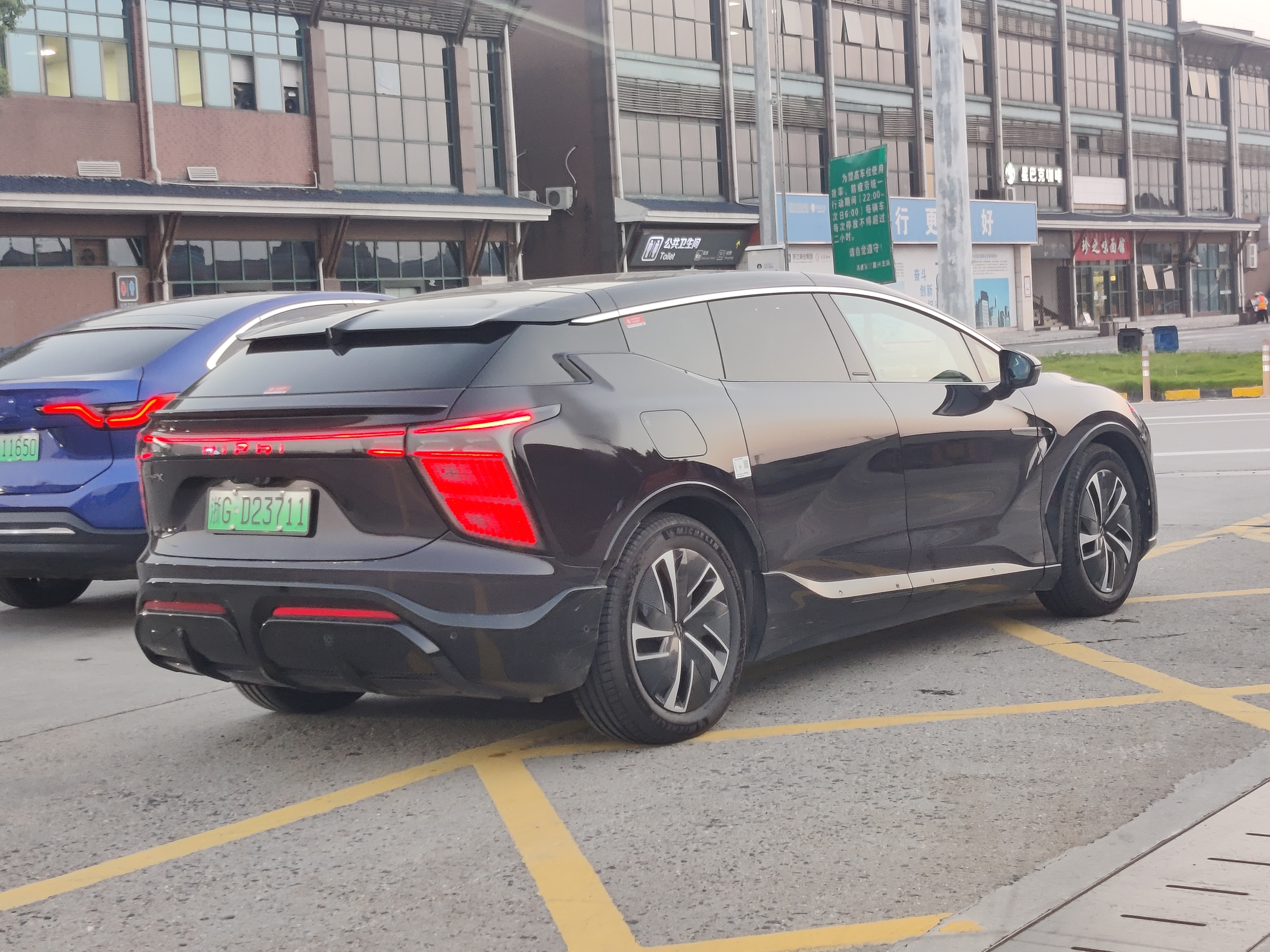
Rear view

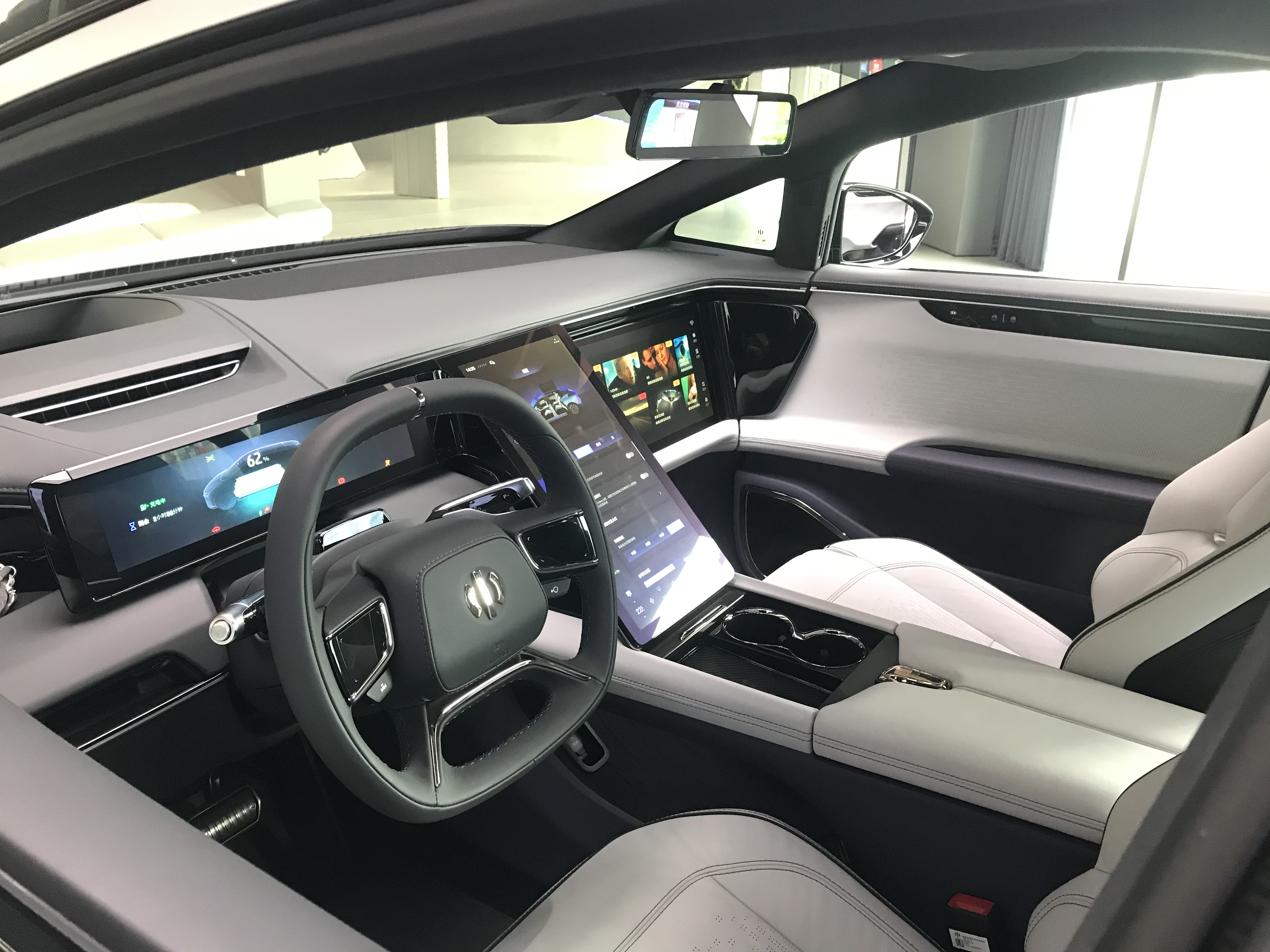
Interior

=== Performance ===
Human Horizons describes the HiPhi X as an all-electric luxury super SUV, with the HiPhi X having a maximum power output of 440 kW (590 hp) and torque of 820Nm. It features a dual electric motor set up for four-wheel drive. Those motors are powered by a 97kWh battery pack.

The HiPhi X can reach 62 mph (100 km/h) in 3.9 seconds and a 124 mph (200 km/h) top speed. The battery range as tested under CLTC (China Light Duty Test Cycle) is 341 miles (550 km).

Fast DC charging allows the HiPhi X to take on an 80% charge in 45 minutes, or 124 miles (200 km) of charge in around 20 minutes with a suitably powerful charger. The HiPhi X's battery and motors and body are fitted to HiPhi's own V-Platform, this using a hybrid construction of steel and aluminium for the best strength and weight.

=== Interior and technology ===
The HiPhi X features an advanced rear door system, with the rear passenger doors being rear hinged and complemented with a gullwing-style top portion that opens above the rear passenger compartment. These NT (No Touch) doors are opened via proximity sensors and a smart key, or the HiPhi app or facial recognition.

The door operation is fully automatic, with a wide opening which gives access to the rear accommodation. The passenger compartment of the four-seater model features a pair of airline-like power-adjustable, ventilated and heated VIP individual seats, which move fore, aft and even inboard, offering a near fully reclined function and adjustable footrests. In the six-seater the HiPhi X adds a pair of rear seats accessible via an easy-entry mode which automatically moves to allow ingress and egress to the third-row seating. The third-row seats are able to accommodate a full-sized adult. All HiPhi X models feature seat heating and ventilation and powered control in the first two rows.

The interior is available in a number of finishes, including semi-aniline leather, Nappa leather or a PU performance laminate leather vegan option.

As well as comfort the HiPhi X aims to integrate luxury with technology describing the driving environment as an Immersive Intelligent Cockpit. There are three large screens in the front compartment with the one ahead of the driver being 14.6 inches for the HiPhi X's instrumentation – this supplemented by a Head Up Display (HUD), with a 16.9-inch central touchscreen as well as an additional screen for the front seat passenger. Four-seat models gain a further rear-seat mounted screen for controlling the rear seat info and entertainment. HiPhi worked with British audio specialists Meridian to create a fully integrated, immersive audio experience, with the standard model coming with the company's Sonic Line system, and the Founders Edition benefitting from Sonic Pro, which increases the speaker count to seventeen and additional sound settings.

HiPhi has developed a simple operating system that allows easy operator usage, though HiPhiGO, a sophisticated voice recognition system allows full system level coverage for interaction and control with many of the HiPhi X's features. The HiPhi describes its integration of technology and luxury in the HiPhi X as TECHLUXE, bringing the best of the traditional luxury automobile industry with technology that enhances the driving experience, comfort and convenience for everyone on board. It features what HiPhi describes as Human Orientated Architecture (HOA) a developer enabled electrical architecture that comes with a 5G-V2X communication network. Over 562 sensors collect data which is supported by six domain controllers with AI technology to constantly adapt and evolve the HiPhi X.

The HiPhi X uses what HiPhi describes as Programmable Matix Lighting (PML) 2.0. The exterior front and rear lights perform all the usual lighting functions, with the additional possibility to project text, icons, pictures and video in front of the vehicle to communicate the trajectory of the vehicle to other vehicles, road users and pedestrians – where it's able to project a walkway crossing onto the road. ISD (Intelligent Signal Display) front and rear additionally allow communication by displaying interactive graphics to convey messages, emotion and the charging state of the vehicle when plugged in.

=== Chassis and suspension ===
The V-Platform chassis consists of a double wishbone front suspension and a multi-link rear set-up, this using air springs and CDC (Continual Damping Control) which monitors the road continually to deliver the best damping for the conditions. Active rear-wheel steering with 10 degrees of movement brings greater agility and stability, as well as significantly improving low speed manoeuvrability, reducing the turning circle considerably. Early tests by automotive publications report the HiPhi X is among the more enjoyable cars in the EV class to drive, with good performance and handling.

HiPhi worked with established automotive partners like Bosch and Michelin when developing the HiPhi X, with Brembo producing its high-performance braking system.

=== Safety ===
The HiPhi X has been crash tested by the Chinese NCAP organisation, achieving a 5 star result.

The HiPhi X is fitted with active driver convenience and safety aids, these including TJP (Traffic Jam Pilot) traffic jam valet, HWA (Highway Assist) high-speed driver assistance, ICC (Intelligent Cruise Control), ACC (Adaptive Cruise Control), AHB (Automatic High Beam) automatic high and low beam switching, FCTA (Front Crossing Traffic Assist), FCW (Forward Collision Warning), AEB (Automatic Emergency Braking), RCW (Rear Collision Warning), LDW (Lane Departure Warning), LKA (Lane Keeping Assist), LCA (Lane Change Assist), ELK (Emergency Lane Keeping), Parking space scanning, APA (Automatic Parking Assist), RPA (Remote Parking Assist), RCTA (Rear Crossing Traffic Assist), AVM (Around View Monitor) panoramic video system with full view coverage and a 360° panoramic image. HiPhi claims all its systems feature dual redundancy like an aircraft, meaning the autonomous functions will still work if a system fails.

The suite of assistance systems is bundled under the name HiPhi Pilot ADAS (Advanced Driver Assistance System) which uses 24 sensors, seven cameras, wave and ultrasonic radar and high precision mapping an GPS, this allowing level 3 driver assistance and autonomy, as well as level 4 autonomous self-driving in an AVP (Autonomous Valet Parking) mode.

=== Production ===
The Dongfeng Yueda Kia's plant in Yancheng, Jiangsu Province will accommodate the initial mass production of the HiPhi X electric crossover starting from 2021.

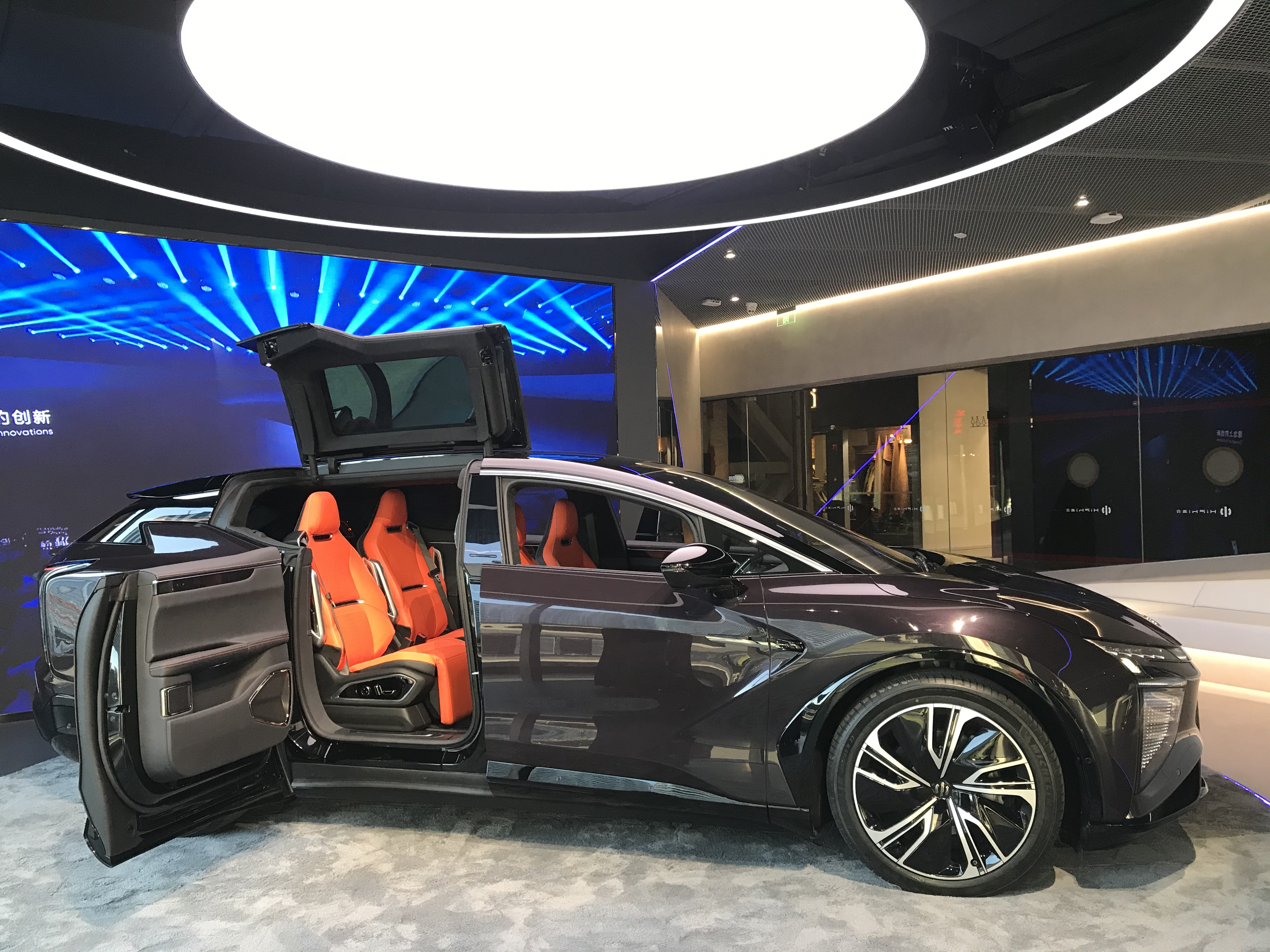
HiPhi X production model door open

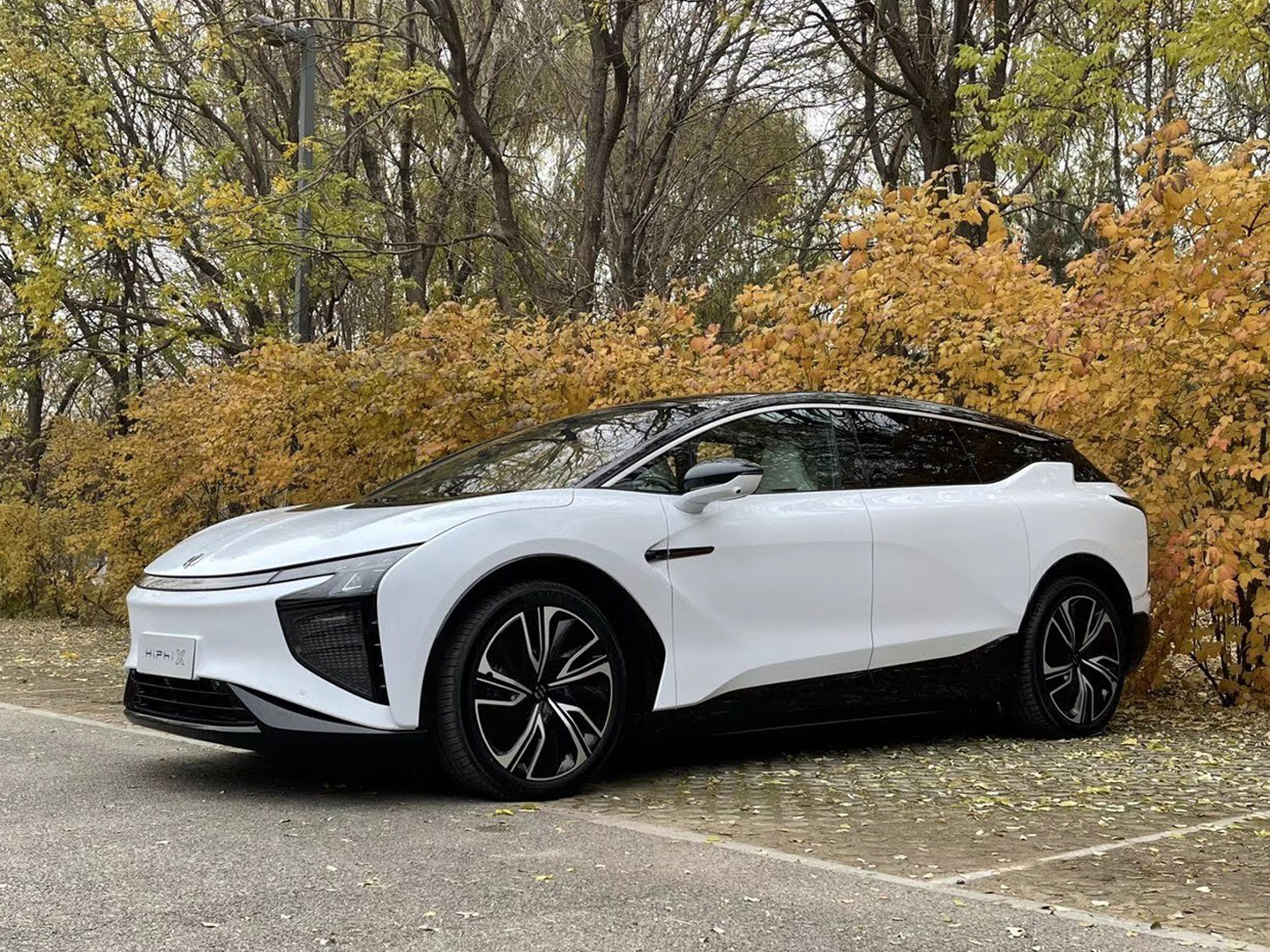
HiPhi X production model front

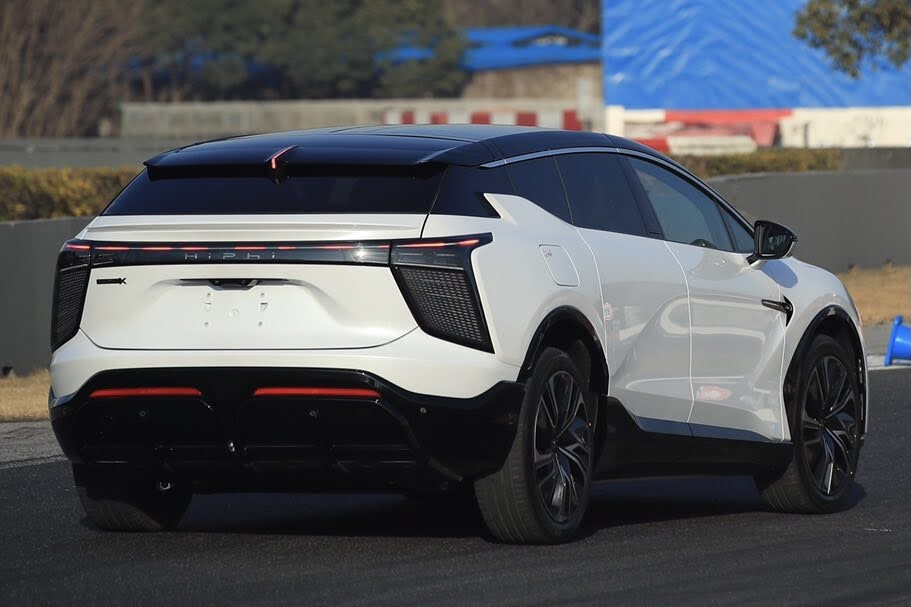
HiPhi X production model rear

=== Market expansion ===
Introduced in China, HiPhi's parent company Human Horizons has announced its plans to bring the HiPhi X to Europe with it having already passed TUV homologation tests.

Following its anticipated arrival in Europe, where it'll be offered alongside the HiPhi X Digital GT and the slightly smaller HiPhi Y – another SUV, the brand is expected to look at the North American market for further expansion.

== Sales ==
Year	China
2021	4,237
2022	4,349
2023	601
2024	39
2025	15

== See also ==
- Tesla Model X
- Nio ES8
