= Hyundai Theta engine =

θ engine^{Theta engine}

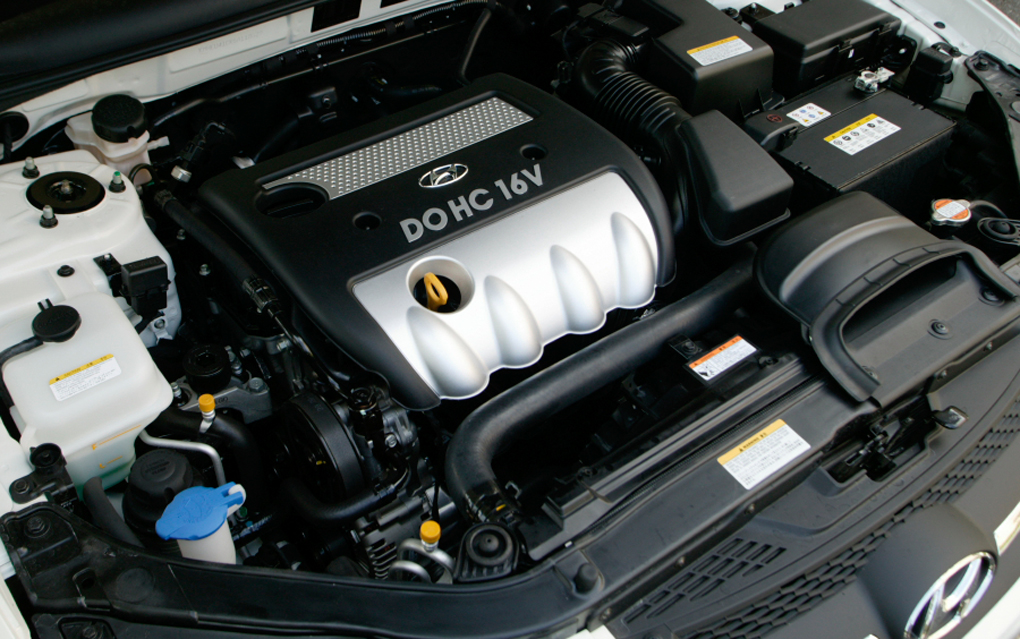

Overview
- Manufacturer: Hyundai Motor Company
- Production: 2004–present

Layout
- Configuration: Inline-four
- Displacement: 110 cu in (1,798 cc); 122 cu in (1,998 cc); 144 cu in (2,359 cc)
- Cylinder bore: 86 mm (3.4 in) (2.0L, 1.8L); 88 mm (3.5 in) (2.4L)
- Piston stroke: 77.4 mm (3.05 in) (1.8L); 86 mm (3.4 in) (2.0L); 97 mm (3.8 in) (2.4L)
- Cylinder block material: Aluminium
- Cylinder head material: Aluminium
- Valvetrain: DOHC
- Compression ratio: 10.5:1 (2.0 L); 10.3:1 (2.4 L MPi); 11.3:1 (2.4 L GDi); 9.5:1–10.0:1 (2.0 L T-GDi)

Combustion
- Fuel system: MPI; GDI
- Management: EMS-II from Siemens VDO
- Fuel type: Unleaded gasoline
- Oil system: Pressure feed
- Cooling system: Watercooled

Output
- Power output: 133–280 PS (98–206 kW; 131–276 hp)
- Torque output: 16.9–40 kg⋅m (166–392 N⋅m; 122–289 lbf⋅ft)

Dimensions
- Dry weight: 134 kg (295 lb) (2.0L); 146 kg (322 lb) (2.4L)

Chronology
- Predecessor: Beta
- Successor: Smartstream G2.5/G2.5T

The Hyundai Theta is a gasoline four-cylinder automobile engine family. The third all-aluminum engine of Hyundai Motor Company debuted in the fourth-generation Hyundai Sonata sedan (codenamed NF), which was unveiled in August 2004 in South Korea. Hyundai Motor Manufacturing Alabama (HMMA) built a Theta II engine shop on the grounds of their Montgomery, Alabama automobile factory.

== Global Engine Alliance ==
The Global Engine Alliance was a joint venture between Chrysler, Mitsubishi Motors, and the Hyundai Motor Company for developing a line of shared four-cylinder engines. Each manufacturer configured their variants of the initial design differently based on their needs. In 2009, Chrysler bought out Mitsubishi and Hyundai's stake in the joint-venture; however, each company retained rights to build the engines.

== Technical details ==
=== Theta ===
The engine features hollow stainless-steel dual overhead camshafts (DOHC) with powder-metal cam lobes, pent-roof combustion chambers and shimless bucket tappets in the cylinder head. BorgWarner Morse TEC supplies the complete timing system which uses the company's proprietary silent timing chains. Continuously variable valve timing (CVVT) works on the intake side.

The aluminum alloy engine block, which is formed using a high-pressure die-cast method, has a unique Metaldyne-supplied cassette-type balance shaft module with a two-stage oil pump built-in. In the lower-end, the block is reinforced by a ladder frame. Other notable features include fracture-split sinter-forged connecting rods manufactured by Sinteron and a stainless-steel exhaust manifold.

Theta's EMS (engine management system) software is EMS-II from Siemens VDO and the 32-bit PCM (Powertrain Control Module) calculates the amount of intake air by utilizing a contamination-proof hot-film type MAF (mass air flow) sensor.

The first version of the Theta Engine had three variants, 1.8L, 2.0L and 2.4L.

==== 1.8L (G4KB) ====
The 1.8L version is an inline 4-cylinder engine that carries a 10.5:1 compression ratio; the engine makes 133–138 PS (98–101 kW; 131–136 hp) at 6,000–6,200 rpm and 16.9–17.5 kg⋅m (122–127 lb⋅ft; 166–172 N⋅m) of torque at 4,250 rpm.

Applications

- Kia Optima (MG) (2005–2008)

==== 2.0L (G4KA) ====
The 2.0L version is an inline 4-cylinder engine that carries a bore and stroke of 86 mm and a 10.5:1 compression ratio; the engine makes 144–151 PS (106–111 kW; 142–149 hp) at 6,000 rpm and 19.1–19.8 kg⋅m (138–143 lb⋅ft; 187–194 N⋅m) of torque at 4,000–4,250 rpm. It uses a timing chain instead of belt, and the engine dry weight is 134 kg (295 lb).

Applications

- Hyundai Sonata (NF) (2004–2007)
- Kia Carens/Rondo (UN) (2006–2013)
- Kia Optima (MG) (2005–2007)

==== 2.4L (G4KC) ====
The 2.4L version is an inline 4-cylinder engine that carries a bore of 88.0 mm, stroke of 97.0 mm and a 10.5:1 compression ratio; the engine dry weight is 146 kg (322 lb) and it makes 165 PS (121 kW; 163 hp) at 5,800 rpm and 22.3–23 kg⋅m (161–166 lb⋅ft; 219–226 N⋅m) of torque at 4,250 rpm.

Applications

- Hyundai Grandeur (TG) (2005–2008)
- Hyundai Sonata (NF) (2004–2007)
- Kia Optima (MG) (2005–2008)
- Kia Rondo (2007–2008)

=== Theta II ===
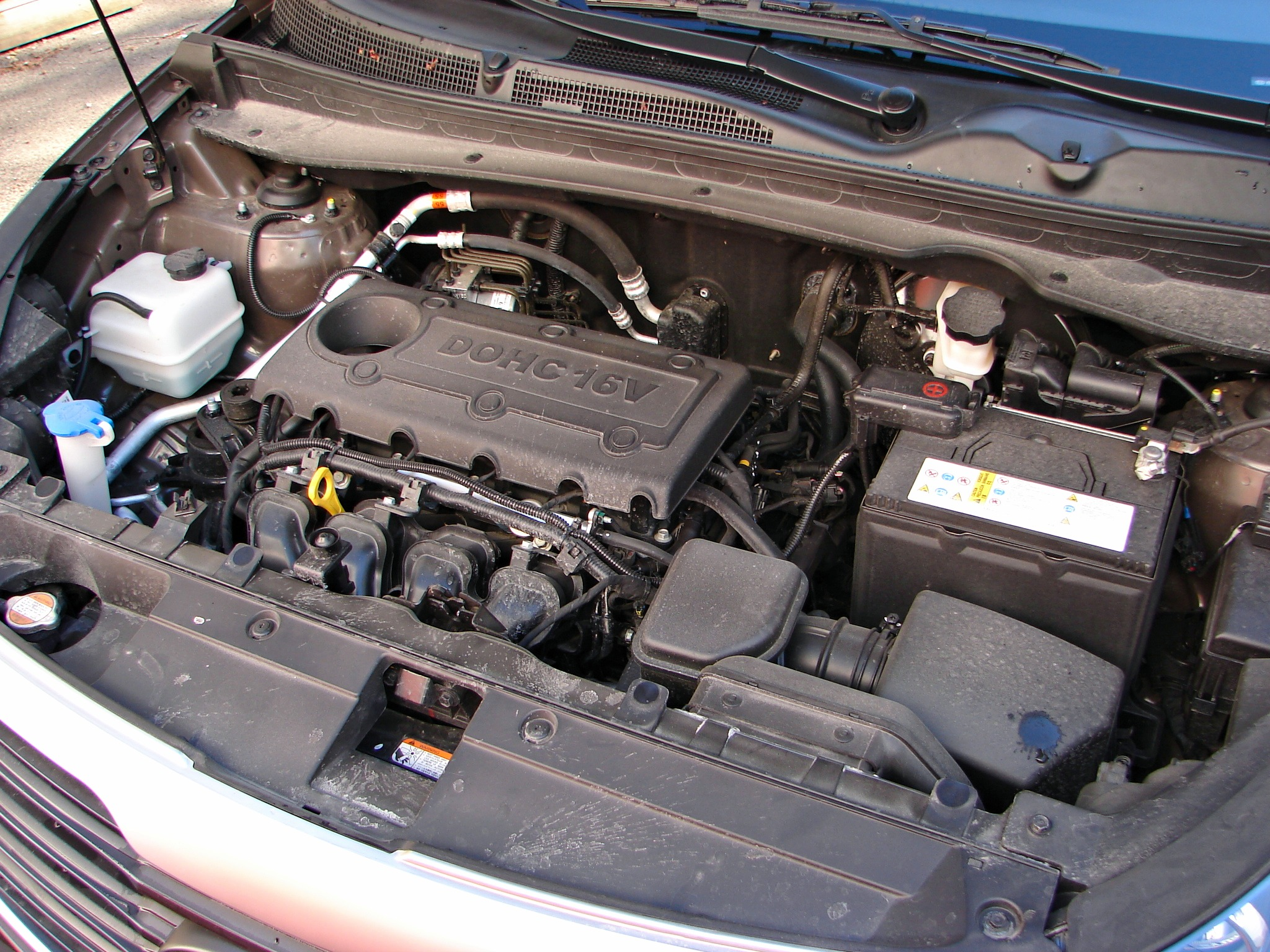
2.0L Theta II engine (G4KD) in a Kia Sportage

The second generation Theta engine added CVVT on the exhaust side as well as a two-way VIS and comes in two sizes, the 2.0L and 2.4L.

==== 2.0L MPI (G4KD) ====
The 2.0L Theta II MPi engine has a 10.5:1 compression ratio, and it produces 165 PS (121 kW; 163 hp) at 6,200 rpm and 20.1–20.2 kg⋅m (145–146 lb⋅ft; 197–198 N⋅m) of torque at 4,500–4,600 rpm.

Applications

- Hyundai Tucson/ix35 (LM) (2009–2015)
- Hyundai Sonata (2007–2014)
- Kia Forte (TD) (2008–2012)
- Kia Optima/K5 (2008–2012)
- Kia Sportage (SL) (2010–2013)

==== 2.4L MPI (G4KE) ====
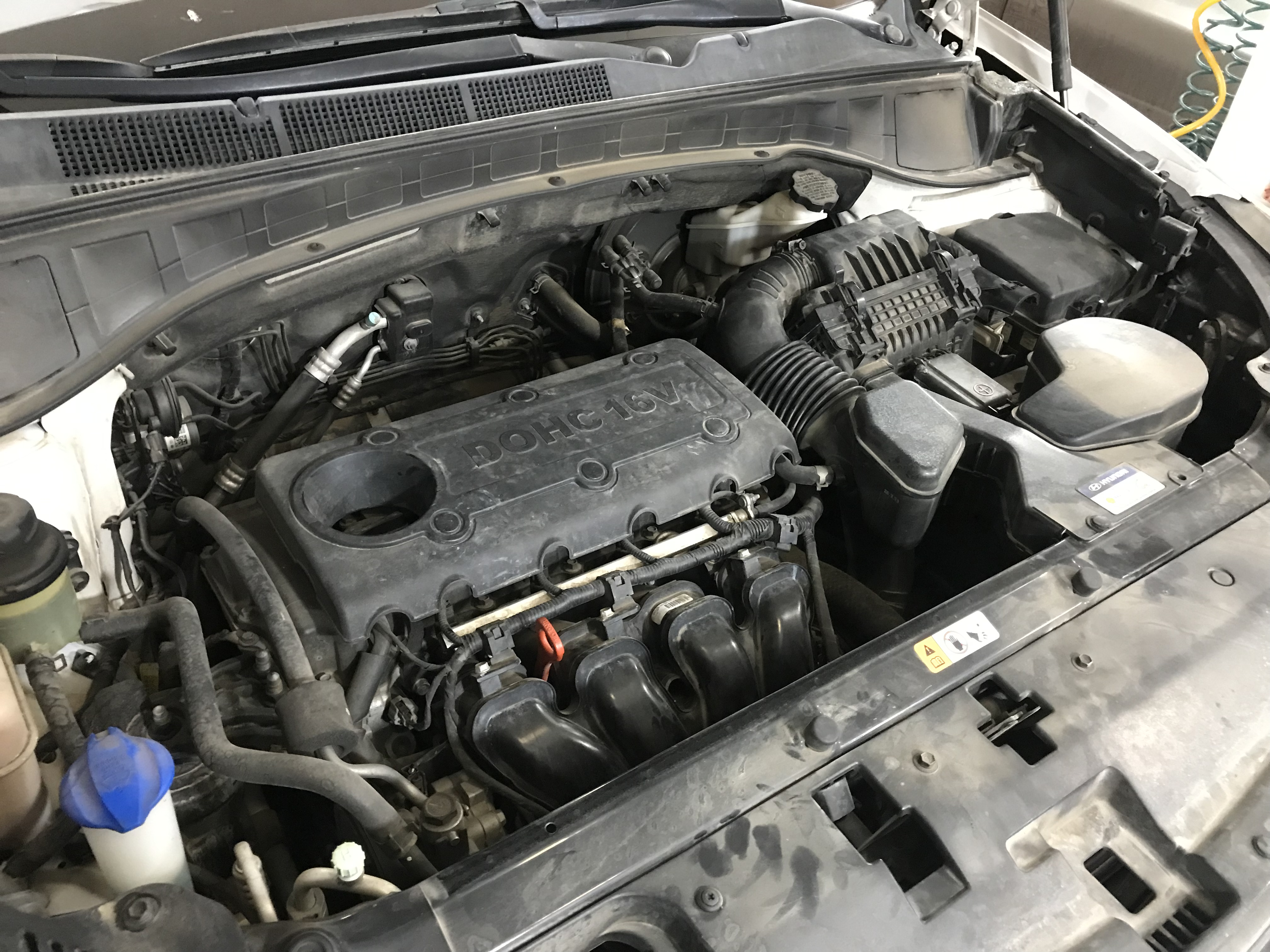
Hyundai Theta II 2.4L MPI (G4KE)

The 2.4L Theta II MPi engine (G4KE) has a 10.5:1 compression ratio, and it produces 178–179 PS (131–132 kW; 176–177 hp) at 6,000 rpm and 23.2–23.5 kg⋅m (168–170 lb⋅ft; 228–230 N⋅m) of torque at 4,000 rpm.

Applications

- Hyundai Azera (HG) (2013–2016)
- Hyundai Grandeur (TG) (2008–2011)
- Hyundai Santa Fe (2010–2020)
- Hyundai Sonata (2007–2019)
- Hyundai Tucson/ix35 (2010–2020)
- Kia Cadenza (2009–2019)
- Kia Forte (TD) (2008–2012)
- Kia Optima (2008–2019)
- Kia Rondo (2008–2013)
- Kia Sportage (2011–2021)
- Kia Sorento (2009–2020)

==== 2.4L FR MPI (G4KG) ====
The 2.4L Theta II FR MPi engine (G4KG) is for RWD applications and has a 10.5:1 compression ratio, and it produces 175 PS (129 kW; 173 hp) at 6,000 rpm and 23.2 kg⋅m (168 lb⋅ft; 228 N⋅m) of torque at 4,200 rpm.

Applications

- Hyundai Starex (TQ) (2007–2021)

==== 2.4L GDI (G4KJ) ====
The Theta II GDI was announced in November 2009 starting with the 6th generation Sonata, improvements include switching to GDI. Compression ratio is 11.3:1, early versions were rated at 201–203 PS (148–149 kW; 198–200 hp) at 6,300 rpm and 25.5 kg⋅m (184 lb⋅ft; 250 N⋅m) of torque at 4,250 rpm while later versions were rated at 188 PS (138 kW; 185 hp) at 6,000 rpm and 24.6 kg⋅m (178 lb⋅ft; 241 N⋅m) of torque at 4,000 rpm.

Applications

- Hyundai Grandeur/Azera (2011–2019)
- Hyundai Santa Fe (2012–2020)
- Hyundai Sonata (2009–2019)
- Hyundai Tucson (TL) (2015–2020)
- Kia Cadenza (2011–2019)
- Kia KX7 (2016–2021)
- Kia Optima (2010–2019)
- Kia Sportage (2010–2021)
- Kia Sorento (UM) (2014–2020)

=== Theta II Turbo ===
==== 2.0L FR Turbo MPI (G4KF) ====
The turbo used is a Mitsubishi TD04 model, the block used is very similar to the 4B11T engine found in Mitsubishi Lancer Evolution X, however most of the rotating assembly is different, with different rod lengths, bearing sizes, and piston compression heights. Additionally the 4B11T is a semi-closed deck block, where the Theta is an open deck block.

For RWD based applications, the 2.0L turbo MPI in the 2009–2012 Genesis Coupe, compression ratio is 9.5:1 and it produces 210–213 PS (154–157 kW; 207–210 hp) at 6,000 rpm and on 91 RON/87 octane (AKI) gasoline, and 226 PS (166 kW; 223 hp) at 6,000 rpm on 98 RON/93 octane (AKI). Torque remains the same at 30.5 kg⋅m (221 lb⋅ft; 299 N⋅m) at 2,000 rpm.

For the facelifted 2013–2014 Genesis Coupe, the engines got upgraded with a new twin-scroll turbocharger, compression ratio is 9.0:1 and the newer version now producing 260–264 PS (191–194 kW; 256–260 hp) at 6,000 rpm and 36 kg⋅m (260 lb⋅ft; 353 N⋅m) of torque between 2,000 and 4,500 rpm on 91 RON/87 octane (AKI) gasoline, and 275–279 PS (202–205 kW; 271–275 hp) at 6,000 rpm and 38 kg⋅m (275 lb⋅ft; 373 N⋅m) of torque between 2,000 and 4,500 rpm on 98 RON/93 octane.

Applications

- Hyundai Genesis Coupe (2009–2014)

==== 2.0L Turbo GDI (G4KH) ====
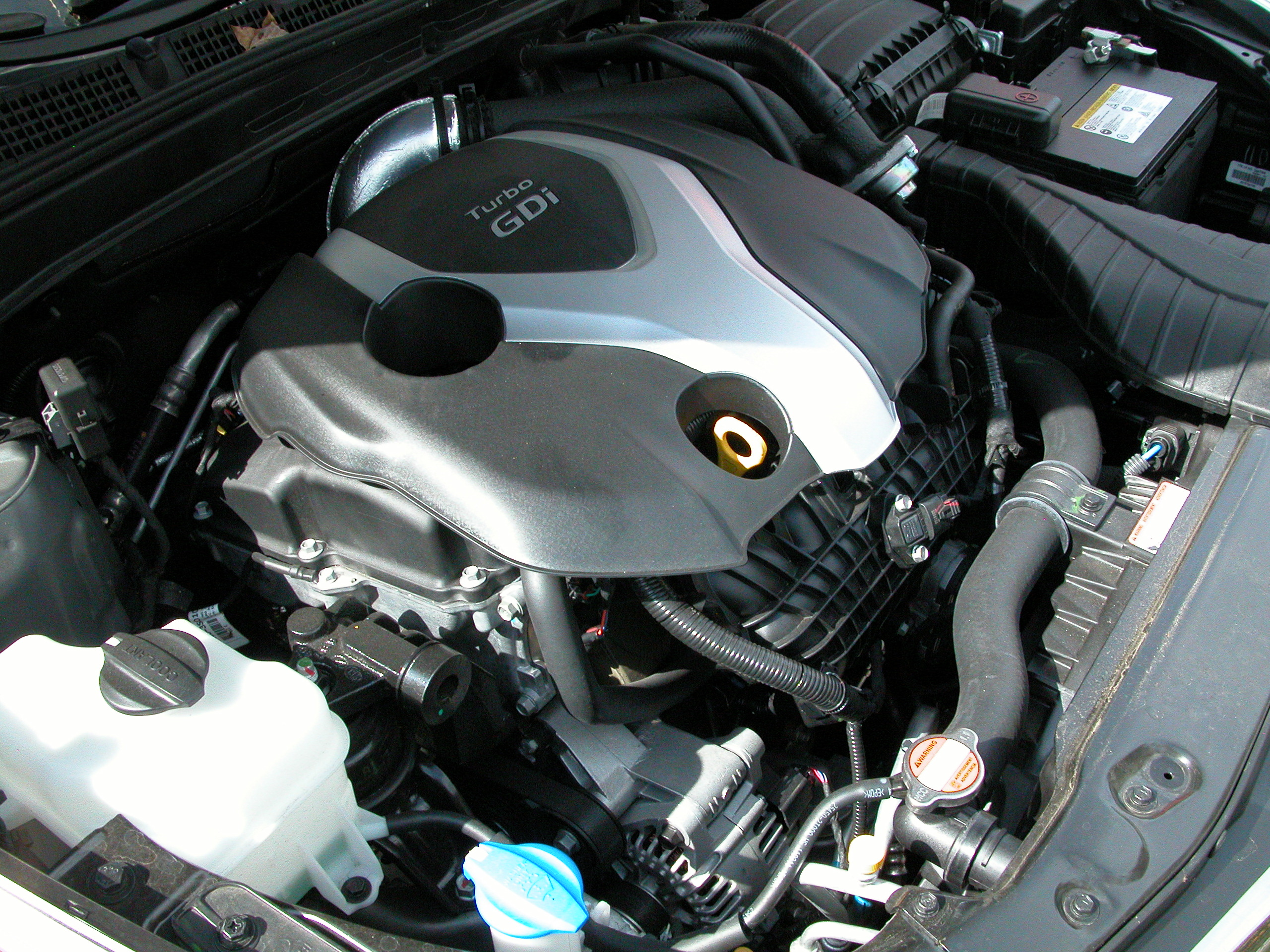
2011 Hyundai Sonata Limited 2.0T, turbo GDI engine

The first iteration of 2.0L T-GDI engine was used in the sixth generation Sonata and third generation Optima, compression ratio is 9.5:1 and the engine develops 261–278 PS (192–204 kW; 257–274 hp) at 6,000 rpm and 37.2 kg⋅m (269 lb⋅ft; 365 N⋅m) of torque between 1,750 rpm and 4,500 rpm.

The updated second iteration of the engine changed the CVVT controls from hydraulic to electronic along with a smaller turbo for improved responsiveness and fuel economy, it was used in the seventh generation Sonata and fourth generation Optima, compression ratio is 10.0:1 and the engine develops 245–248 PS (180–182 kW; 242–245 hp) at 6,000 rpm and 36 kg⋅m (260 lb⋅ft; 353 N⋅m) of torque between 1,350 rpm and 4,000 rpm.

The high power version of the second iteration uses a bigger turbocharger to improve power, its used in the i30N and Veloster N, compression ratio is 9.5:1 and the engine develops 250–275 PS (184–202 kW; 247–271 hp) at 6,000 rpm and 36 kg⋅m (260 lb⋅ft; 353 N⋅m) of torque between 1,450 rpm and 4,700 rpm, for the Kona N and Elantra N the power output is 280 PS (206 kW; 276 hp) at 6,000 rpm and 40 kg⋅m (289 lb⋅ft; 392 N⋅m) of torque between 2,100 rpm and 4,700 rpm.

Applications

- Hyundai Elantra N (2021–present)
- Hyundai i30 N (2018–present)
- Hyundai Kona N (2021–2023)
- Hyundai Santa Fe (2012–2020)
- Hyundai Sonata (2009–2019)
- Hyundai Veloster N (2018–2022)
- Kia KX7 (2016–2021)
- Kia Optima (2011–2019)
- Kia Sorento (UM) (2015–2020)
- Kia Sportage (2011–2021)

==== 2.0L FR Turbo GDI (G4KL) ====
For the RWD based applications, compression ratio is 10.0:1 and the engine develops 252–255 PS (185–188 kW; 249–252 hp) at 6,200 rpm and 36 kg⋅m (260 lb⋅ft; 353 N⋅m) of torque between 1,400 rpm and 4,000 rpm.

A detuned version that develops 197 PS (145 kW; 194 hp) between 4,500 and 6,200 rpm and 36 kg⋅m (260 lb⋅ft; 353 N⋅m) of torque between 1,450 rpm and 3,500 rpm is used for the European market.

Applications

- Genesis G70 (2017–2023)
- Genesis G80 (DH) (2017–2020)
- Kia Stinger (2017–2023)

=== Theta II HEV ===
==== 2.4L (G4KK) ====
The 2.4L Theta II Hybrid engine compression ratio is 13.0:1, it features multi-point fuel injection and the gasoline engine produce 171 PS (126 kW; 169 hp) at 6,000 rpm and 21.6 kg⋅m (156 lb⋅ft; 212 N⋅m) of torque at 4,500 rpm, the electric motor is rated 41 PS (30 kW; 40 hp) between 1,400 and 6,000 rpm with 20.9 kg⋅m (151 lb⋅ft; 205 N⋅m) of torque between 0 and 1,400 rpm.

Total system output with the electric motor is rated 212 PS (156 kW; 209 hp) and 27 kg⋅m (195 lb⋅ft; 265 N⋅m) of torque.

Newer revision of this engine combines a 159 PS (117 kW; 157 hp) at 5,500 rpm and 21 kg⋅m (152 lb⋅ft; 206 N⋅m) of torque at 4,500 rpm engine plus a 51 PS (38 kW; 50 hp) between 1,770 and 2,000 rpm with 20.9 kg⋅m (151 lb⋅ft; 205 N⋅m) of torque between 0 and 1,770 rpm electric motor for a total system power of 200 PS (147 kW; 197 hp) at 5,500 rpm and 27 kg⋅m (195 lb⋅ft; 265 N⋅m) of torque.

Applications

- Hyundai Grandeur/Azera Hybrid (2013–2022)
- Kia Cadenza/K7 Hybrid (2013–2021)

=== Theta LPG ===
==== 2.0L (L4KA) ====
The 2.0 L (1,998 cc) engine features LPI injection and makes 136–144 PS (100–106 kW; 134–142 hp) at 6,000 rpm with 18.7–19.3 kg⋅m (135–140 lb⋅ft; 183–189 N⋅m) of torque at 4,250 rpm.

Applications

- Hyundai Sonata (2004–2011)
- Kia Carens (UN) (2006–2013)
- Kia Lotze (2005–2010)
- Kia K5 (2010–2011)

==== 2.4L (L4KB) ====
The 2.4 L (2,359 cc) engine features LPI injection and makes 159 PS (117 kW; 157 hp) at 5,500 rpm with 23 kg⋅m (166 lb⋅ft; 226 N⋅m) of torque at 4,250 rpm.

Applications

- Hyundai Starex (2008–2021)

== Engine recall ==
Hyundai and Kia vehicles equipped with Theta II engines (GDI) were recalled, due to the fact that those engines were, and continue to be, the subject of an investigation by the National Highway Traffic Safety Administration (NHTSA). Safety regulators are investigating if Hyundai and Kia did enough in a timely manner with regards to the recalls of nearly 1.7 million vehicles with Theta engines, which were prone to an abnormal amount of noise and seizing.

In September 2015, Hyundai recalled about 470,000 model year 2011-2012 Sonatas equipped with 2-liter and 2.4-liter Theta II engines. At the time, Hyundai told NHTSA that manufacturing problems left metallic debris around the engine crankshaft, causing problems with oil flow. The pieces of metal interfere with the oil flow through the connecting rod bearings and damage the connecting rods. The automaker blamed the problem on a mechanical "deburring" process used to remove metallic machining debris from the crankshaft.

By April 2017, Hyundai expanded the 2015 recall by including another 572,000 vehicles with Theta II engines, including 2013-2014 Hyundai Sonata and Santa Fe Sport vehicles. Hyundai told safety regulators the same metal debris problem caused the expanded recall. Near that same time, Kia told NHTSA about a recall of more than 618,000 model year 2011-2014 Kia Optima, 2012-2014 Sorento and 2011-2013 Sportage vehicles because the Theta engine bearings wore out too early and caused the engines to seize. Kia said it didn't recall the vehicles in 2015 when Hyundai first recalled its cars because the Theta II engines in the Kia vehicles were built on a different production line and had different problems than Hyundai. In addition to customers complaining about the Theta II engines, a Korean whistleblower who worked for Hyundai as an engineer let NHTSA know what he knew. Owners filed more than 29,000 complaints with the National Highway Traffic Safety Administration regarding the 2.4-litre Theta II engine, including dozens alleging engine fires.

Also in April 2017, Hyundai and Kia Motors planned to recall 170,000 vehicles in South Korea from five models, including their Grandeur and Sonata, after acknowledging a defect in the Theta 2 engines used in them. Eventually, 520,000 vehicles were recalled in South Korea.

Owners started suing after the automaker refused to pay the thousands of dollars to repair or replace the engines, with one lawsuit from 2015 alleging a dealer wanted $4,500 to do the work. Kia was also served papers over a class-action lawsuit in 2016 filed by owners of vehicles equipped with Theta engines. NHTSA says it took action to "investigate both the timeliness and scope of Hyundai's Theta II engine recalls, and Hyundai's compliance with reporting requirements."

In Canada in 2019, Hyundai announced a recall for most vehicles using the affected engines, however a class action lawsuit was filed in 2018 as a result of failures of this engine used in Canadian Forte models and lack of manufacturer support against Kia Canada Inc.

On December 1, 2020, Hyundai and Kia recalled 423,000 vehicles equipped with various engines following a joint review by Hyundai and the NHTSA, of which the 2.4L Theta II MPI engines were a part of. This marks the first instance of the MPI variants of these engines being recalled. Affected vehicles include the 2011-2013 Hyundai Sonata Hybrid, 2012 Hyundai Santa Fe, 2012-2013 Kia Sorento, 2011-2013 Kia Optima Hybrid, 2012-2013 Kia Forte and Forte Koup, and the 2012 Kia Sportage 2.4l.

== Crate engines ==
On November 5, 2013, Hyundai announced the creation of a new factory crate engine program at the 2013 SEMA Show in Las Vegas, which initially included a 2.0-liter, turbocharged four-cylinder engine. The crate engine program began in December 2013.

== See also ==
- Chrysler World engine – Chrysler's GEMA built engines
- Mitsubishi 4B1 engine – Mitsubishi's GEMA built engines
- List of Hyundai engines
