= Jiangsu Yueda Kia Motors =

Chinese automotive manufacturing company

Jiangsu Yueda Kia Motors Co., Ltd. 江苏悦达起亚汽车有限公司

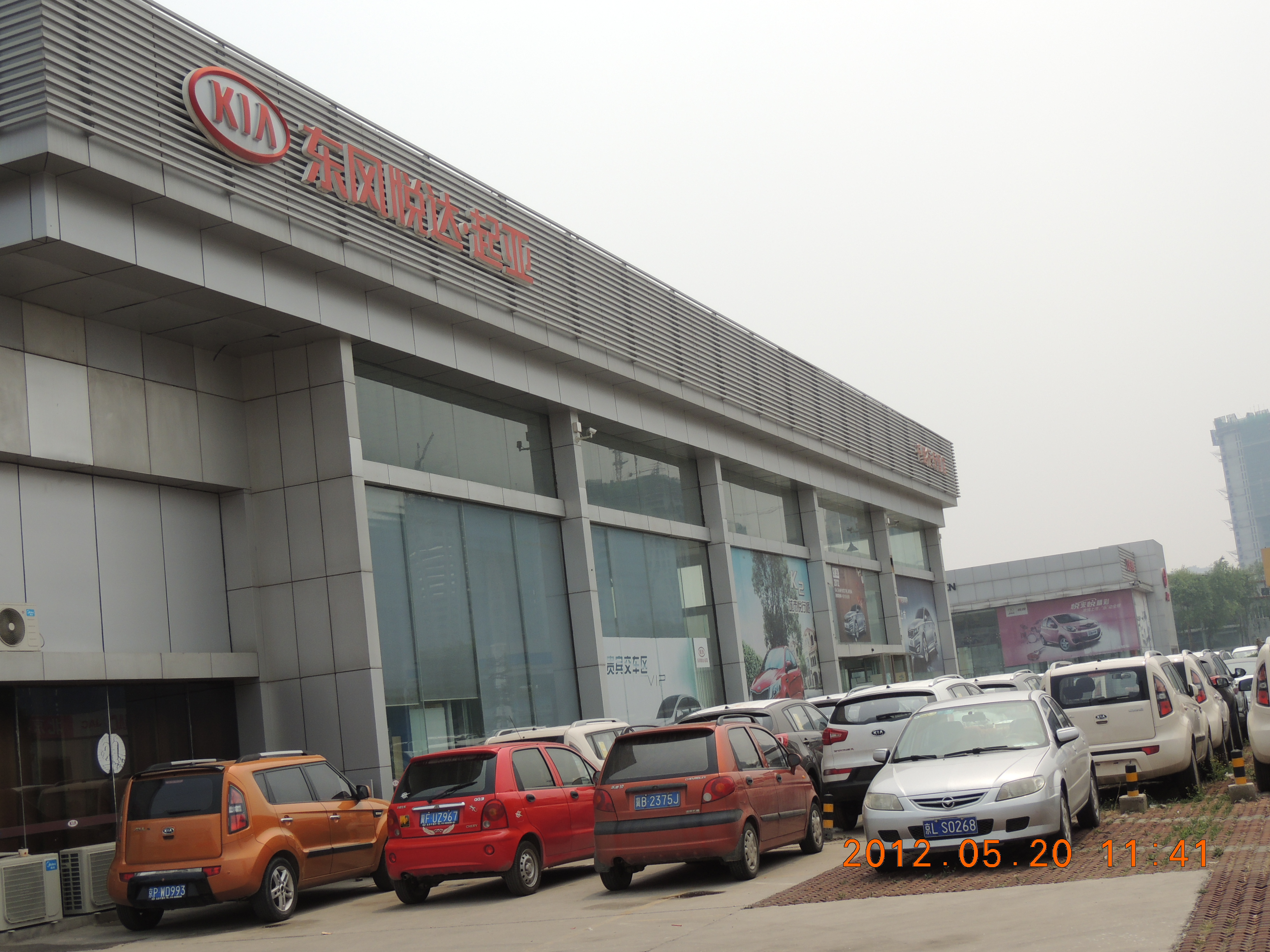
- facade of Dongfeng Yueda Kia dealership in China
- Formerly: Dongfeng Yueda Kia Motors Co., Ltd. (until 2022)
- Type: Joint venture
- Industry: Automotive
- Founded: 28 August 2002; 24 years ago
- Headquarters: Yancheng, Jiangsu, China
- Products: Automobiles
- Parent: Kia (50%); Jiangsu Yueda Group (25%); Jiangsu Yueda Investment (25%)
- Website: www.kia.cn

Jiangsu Yueda Kia Motors Co., Ltd. is an automotive manufacturing company headquartered in Yancheng, China and a joint venture between Jiangsu Yueda Group and Kia. The company was formerly known as Dongfeng Yueda Kia Motors Co., Ltd. until Dongfeng withdrew from the joint venture in late 2021.

== History ==
Dongfeng Yueda Kia was founded in 2002. In August 2003, it was announced that Dongfeng Yueda Kia would invest around US$600 million in the construction of a new assembly plant in Jiangsu Province with a capacity to produce 400,000 vehicles per year.

In November 2011, Dongfeng Yueda Kia announced that it would construct its third automobile manufacturing plant in Yancheng. Construction of the plant took place between 2012 and 2014. The plant has an annual production capacity of 300,000 cars.

In December 2021, Dongfeng sold its 25% stake in the joint venture to Jiangsu Yueda for CN¥297 million.

In February 2022, South Korea's Kia Motors Corporation signed an agreement to expand investment with the People's Government of Yancheng City and Jiangsu Yueda Group, and the two parties will establish a new joint venture. On the evening of 1 March, Yueda Automobile issued an announcement that Dongfeng Yueda Kia Automobile Co., Ltd. plans to increase capital by US$600 million. Yueda Investment issued an announcement to give up increasing investment in Dongfeng Yueda Kia. Prior to this capital increase, the equity structure of Dongfeng Yueda Kia was Kia Corporation, Yueda Automobile Group, and Yueda Investment, each holding 50%, 25%, and 25%, After the capital increase, the shareholding ratio of the new company is 50% for Kia Motors, 45.8% for Yueda Automobile Group and 4.2% for Yueda Investment respectively. Yueda Automobile Group and Yueda Investment are persons acting in concert.

On 22 March 2022, Dongfeng Yueda Kia was renamed Kia Motors Co., Ltd. In May of the same year, it was renamed Jiangsu Yueda Kia Motors Co., Ltd.

== Plants ==
The Jiangsu-Yueda-Kia's plant in Yancheng, Jiangsu Province manufactures Kia vehicles for the Chinese market. The plant will also accommodate the initial mass production of the HiPhi X electric crossover starting from 2021.

Plant Type	Location	Year opened	Year closed	Notes
Yancheng car plant	Yancheng, Jiangsu Province (江苏), China		active	

== Sales ==
Calendar year	Total sales
2007	101,000
2008	142,000
2009	241,000
2010	333,000
2011	433,000

== Vehicles ==
- Kia Carnival
- Kia K3
- Kia K5
- Kia Stonic
- Kia Seltos
- Kia Sonet
- Kia Pegas/Soluto
- Kia Sportage Ace
- Kia Sportage
- Kia EV6 (imported)
- Kia EV5

=== Former vehicles ===
- Kia Cerato
- Kia Furuidi
- Kia K2
- Kia K4
- Kia KX Cross
- Kia KX3
- Kia KX5
- Kia KX7
- Kia Optima
- Kia Rio
- Kia Qianlima
- Kia Sportage R
- Kia Soul

=== HiPhi vehicles ===
- HiPhi X
- HiPhi Y
- HiPhi Z

== Gallery ==
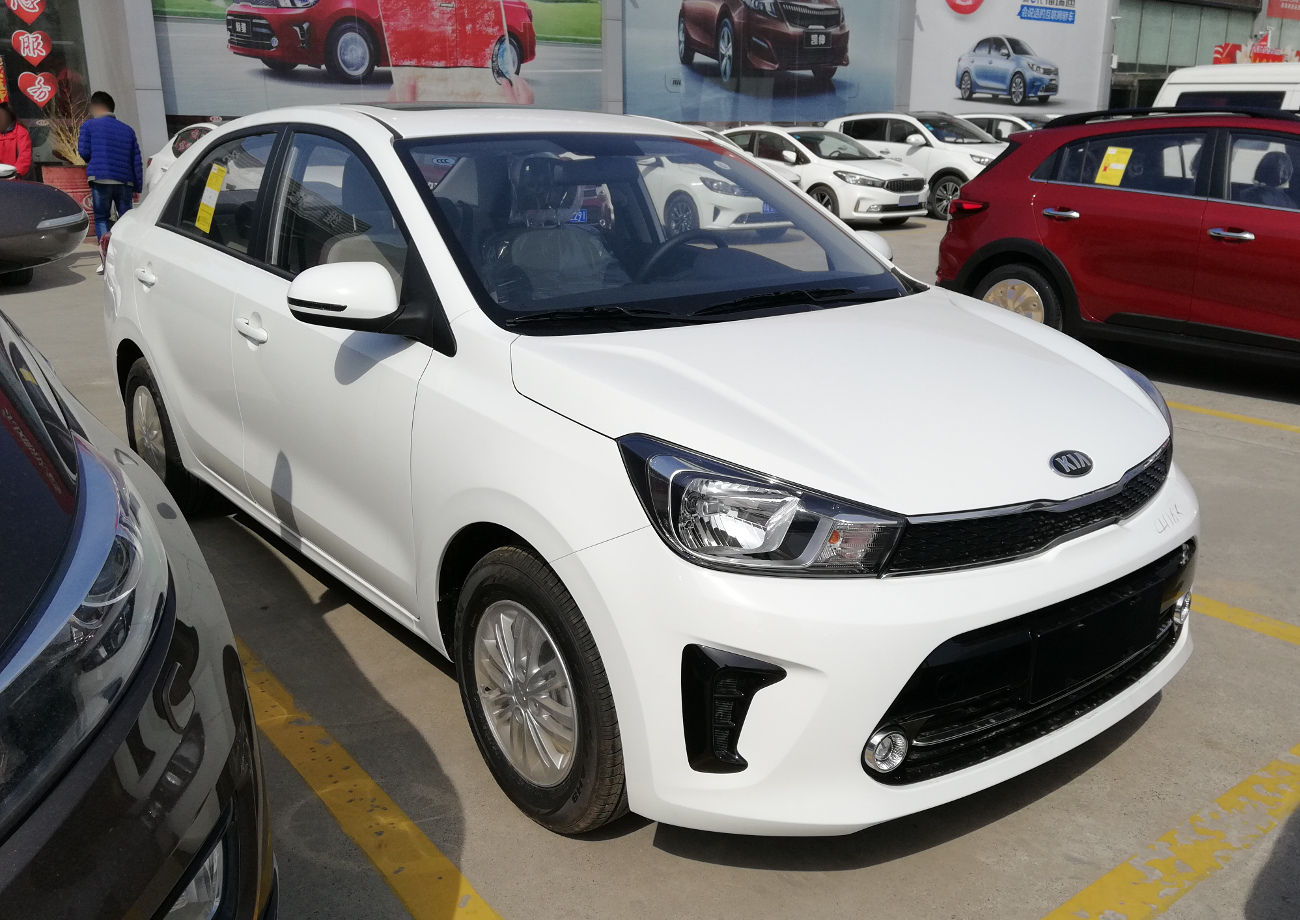
Kia Pegas

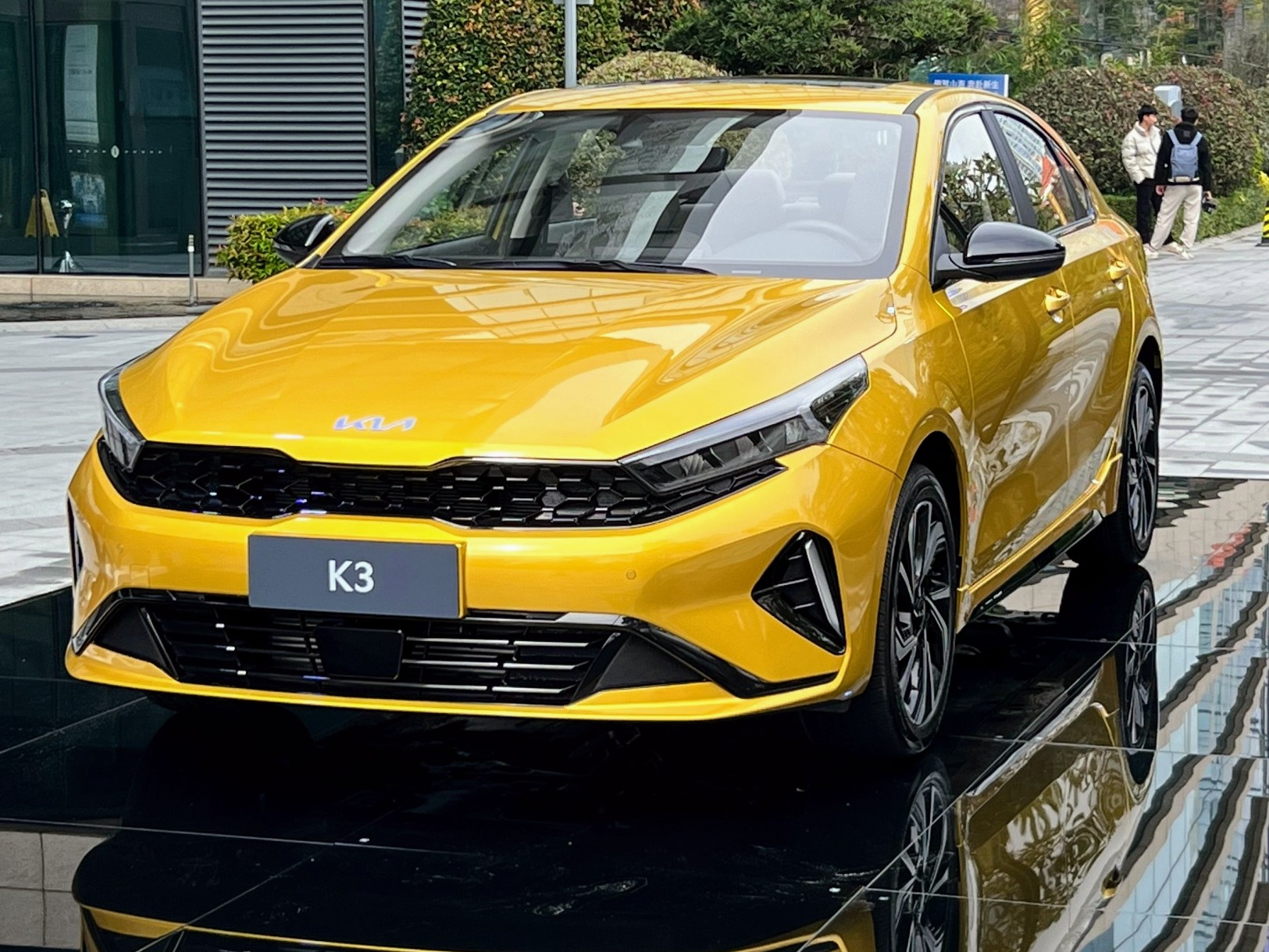
Kia K3

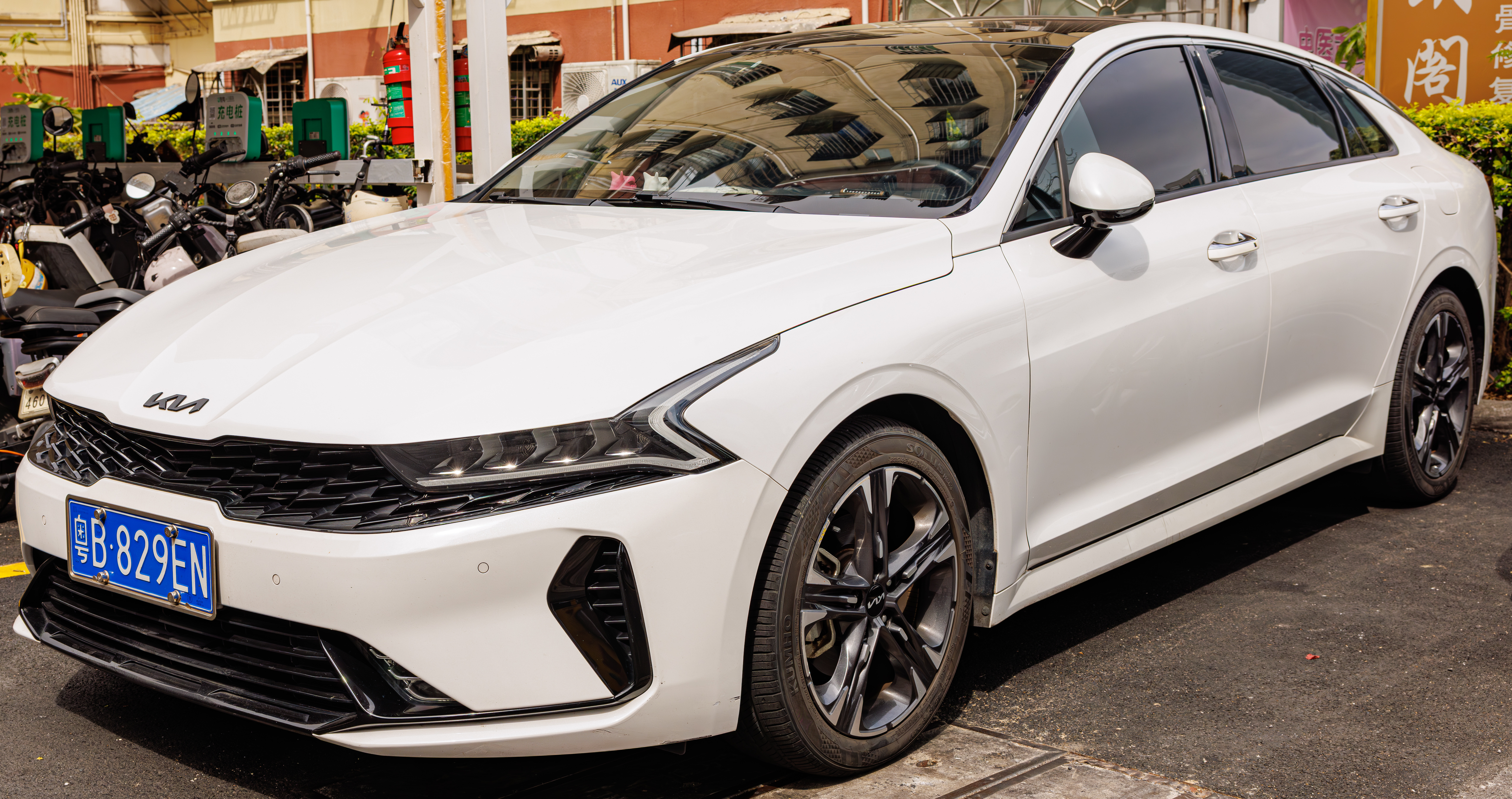
Kia K5

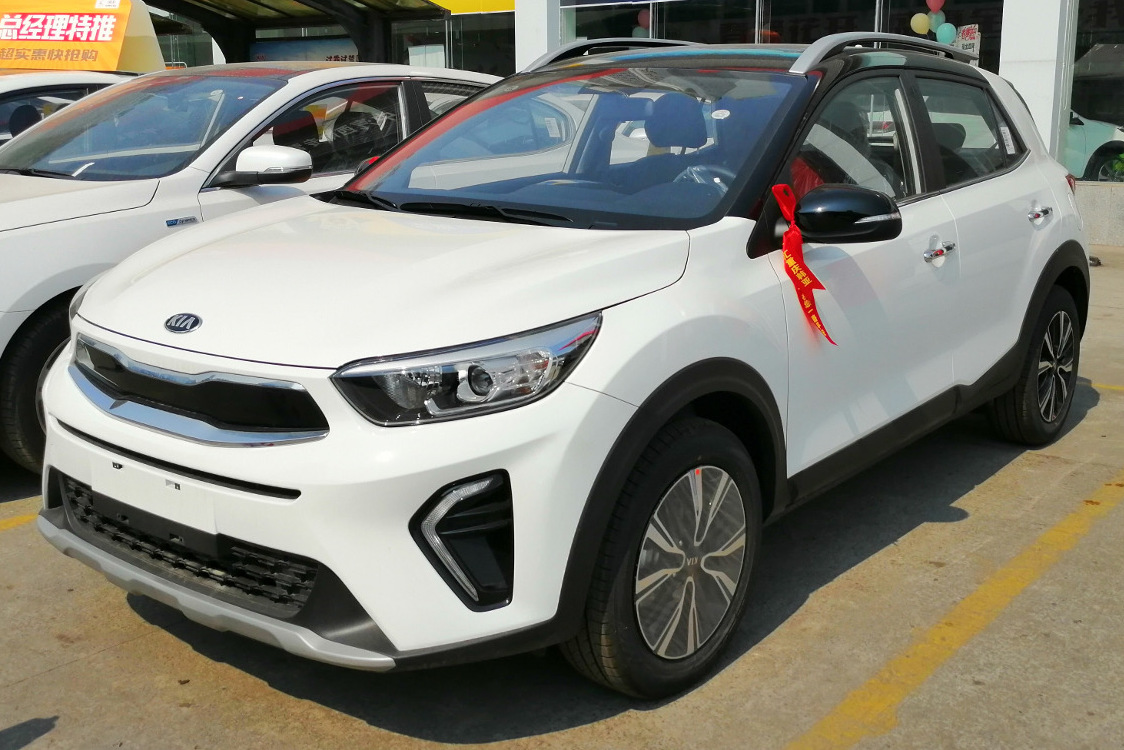
Kia Stonic

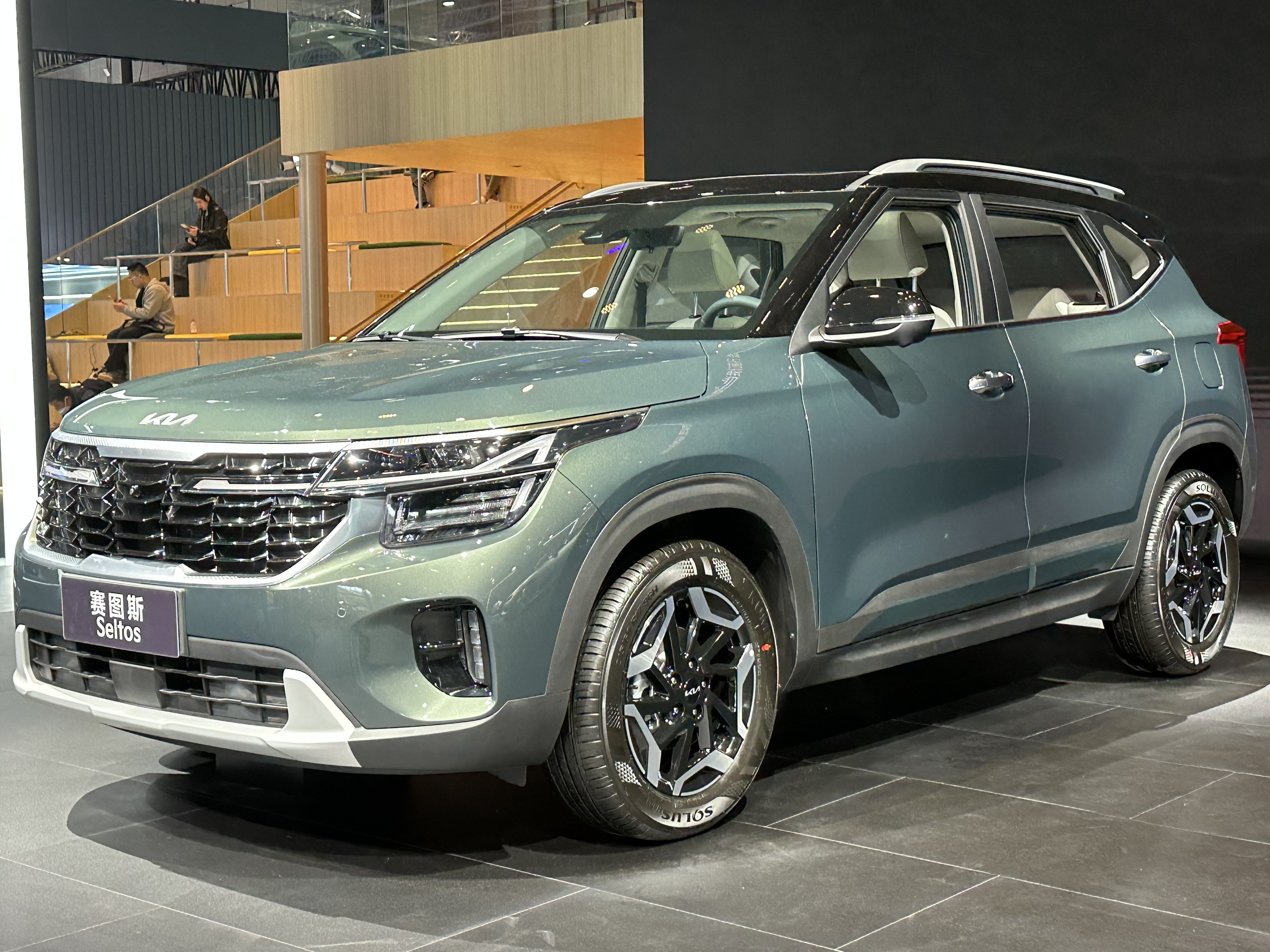
Kia Seltos

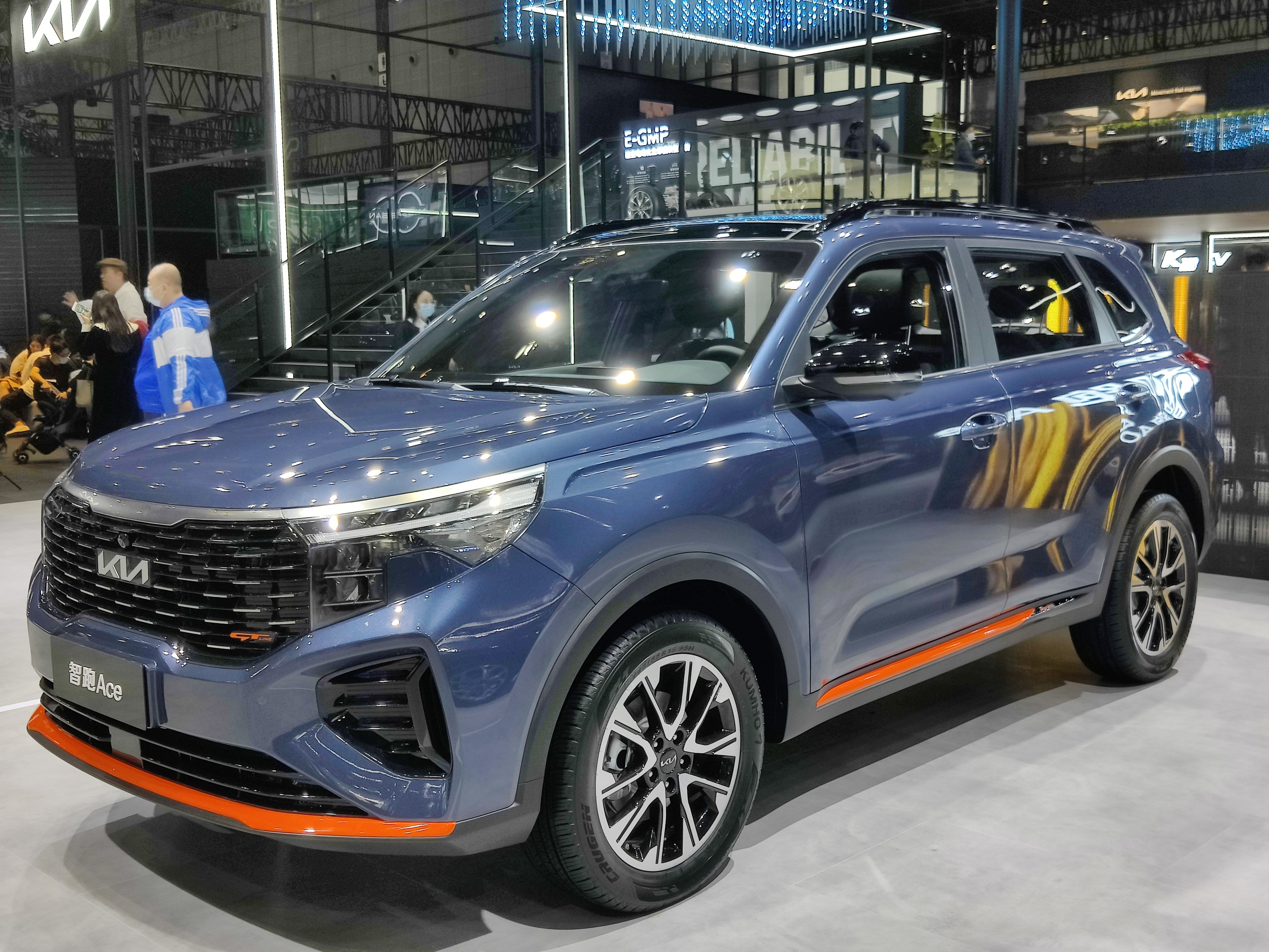
Kia Sportage Ace

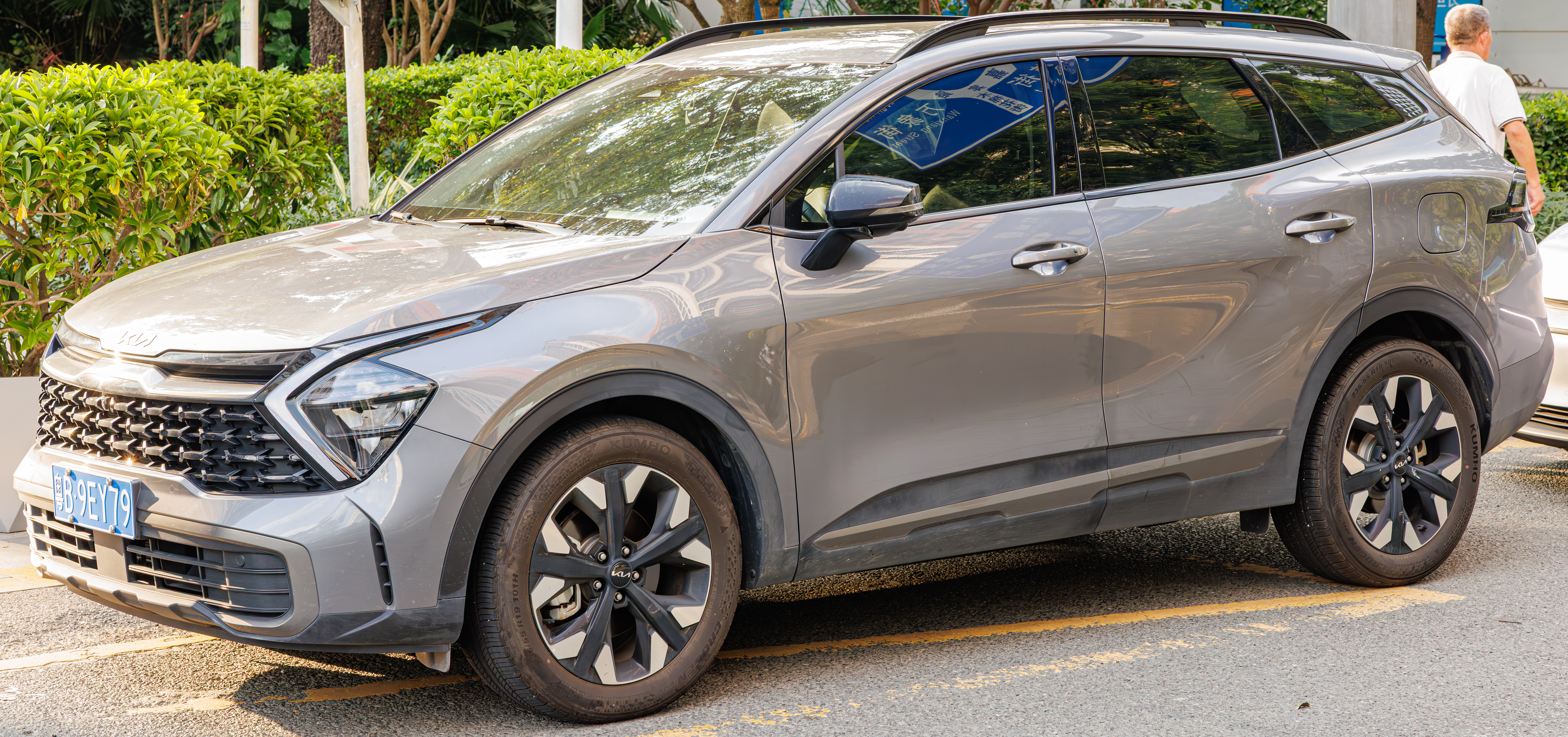
Kia Sportage

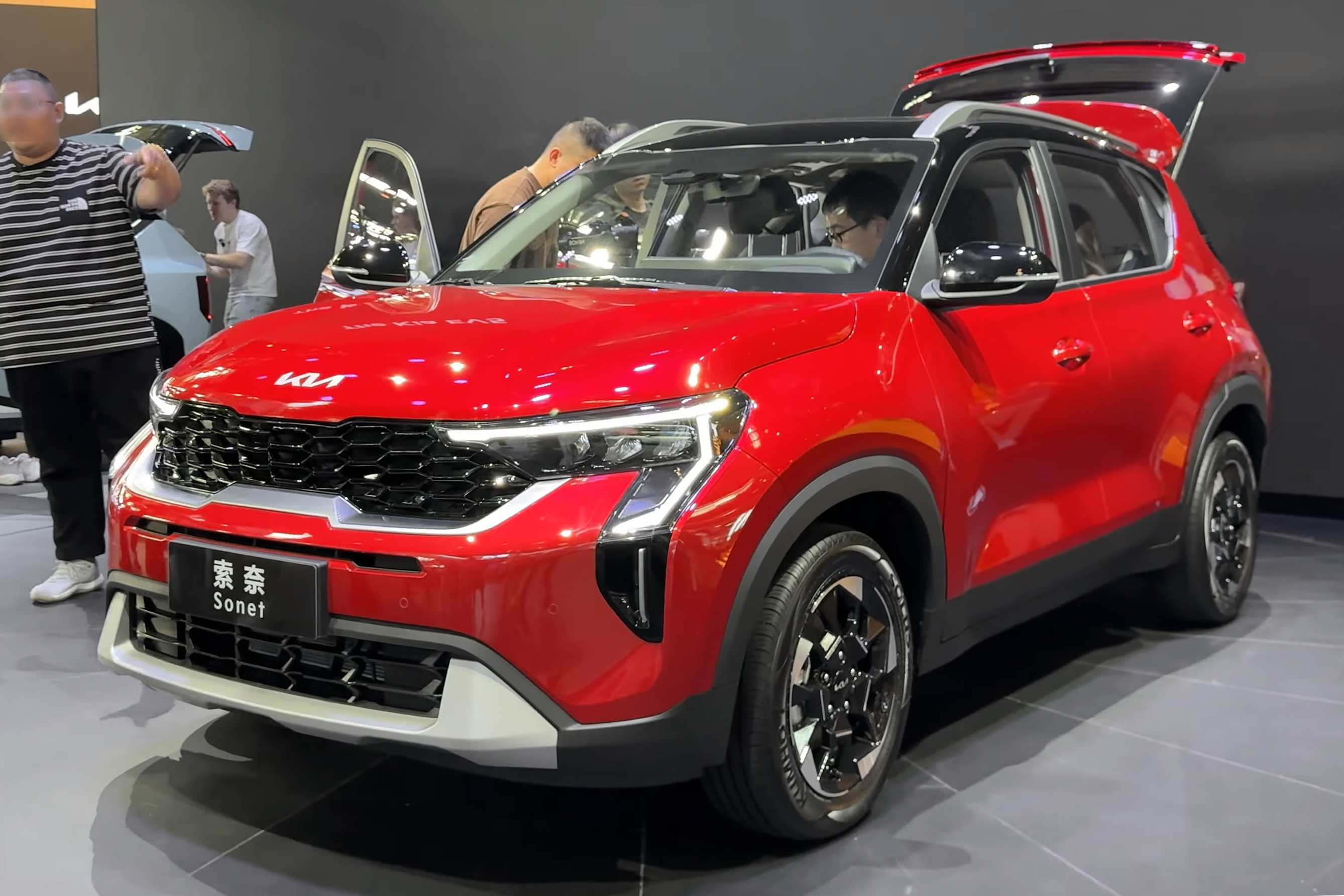
Kia Sonet

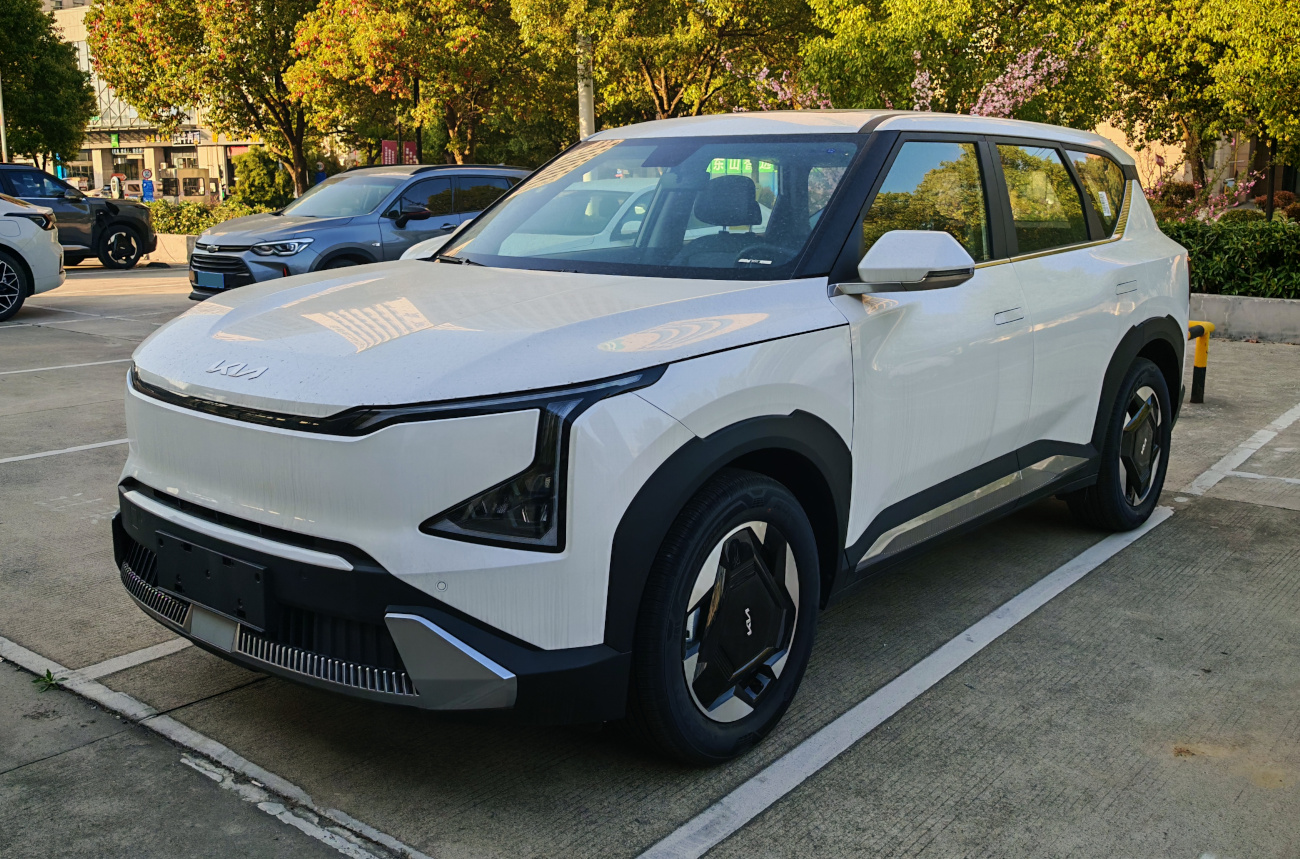
Kia EV5

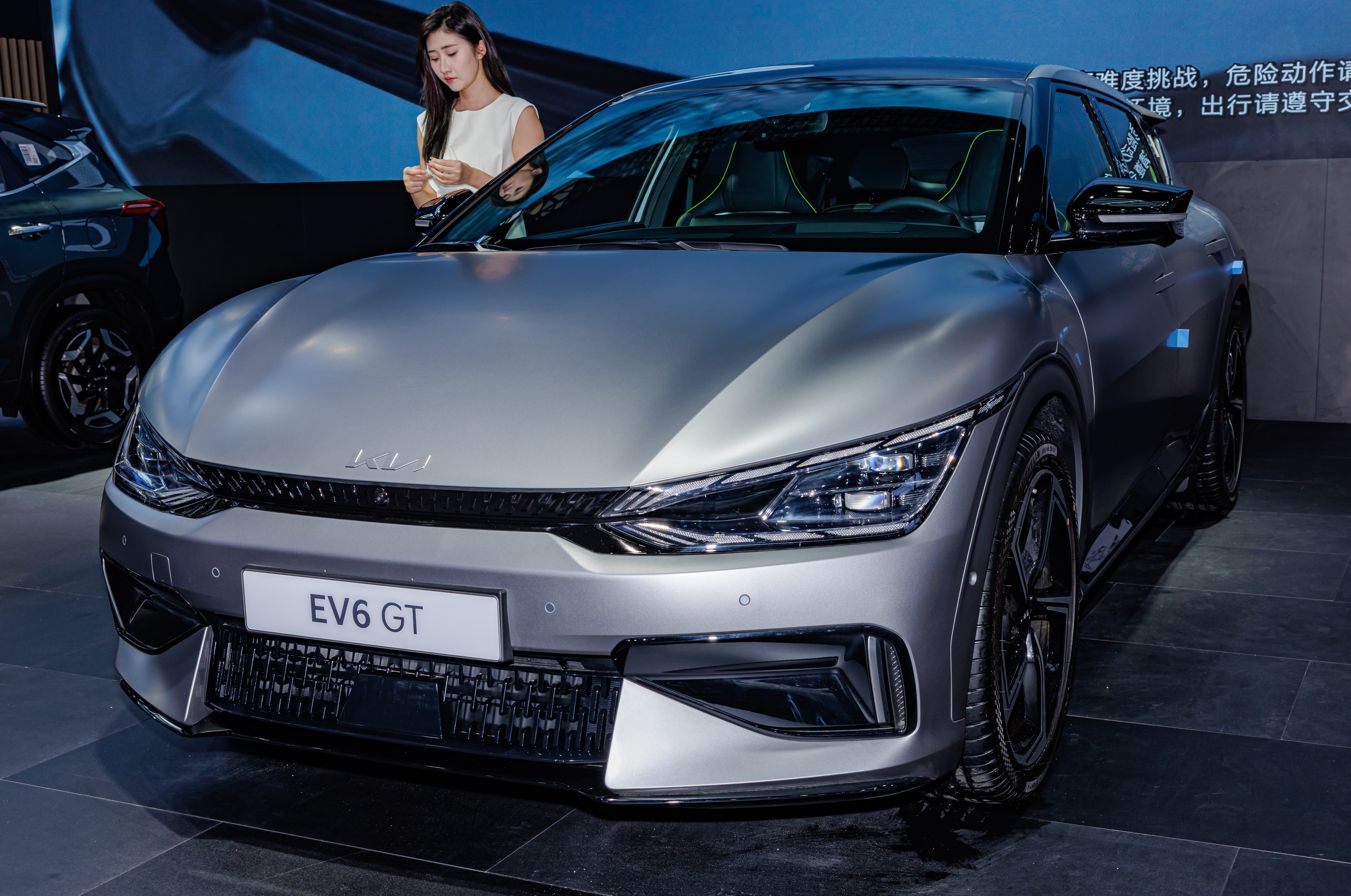
Kia EV6

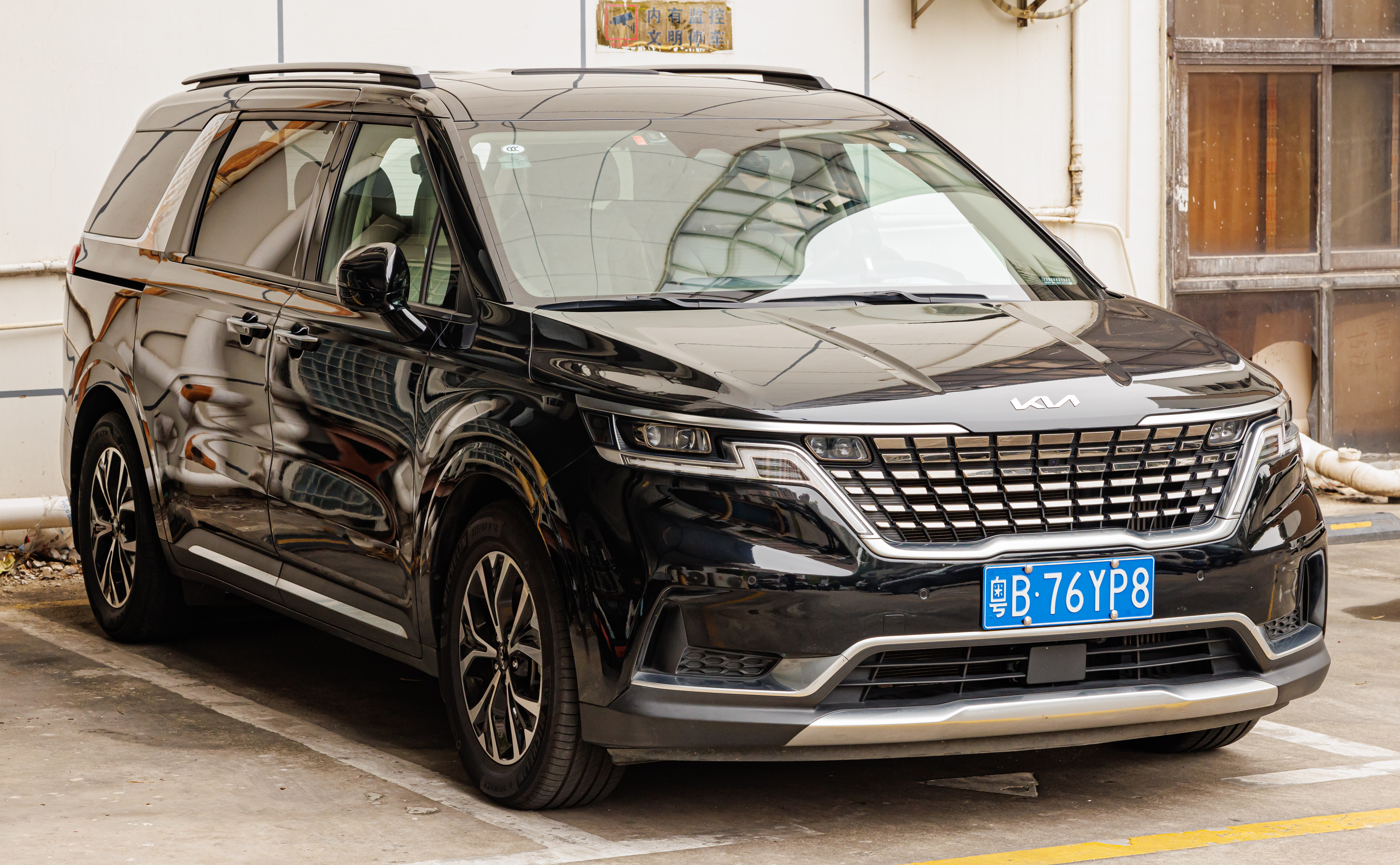
Kia Carnival

=== Former ===
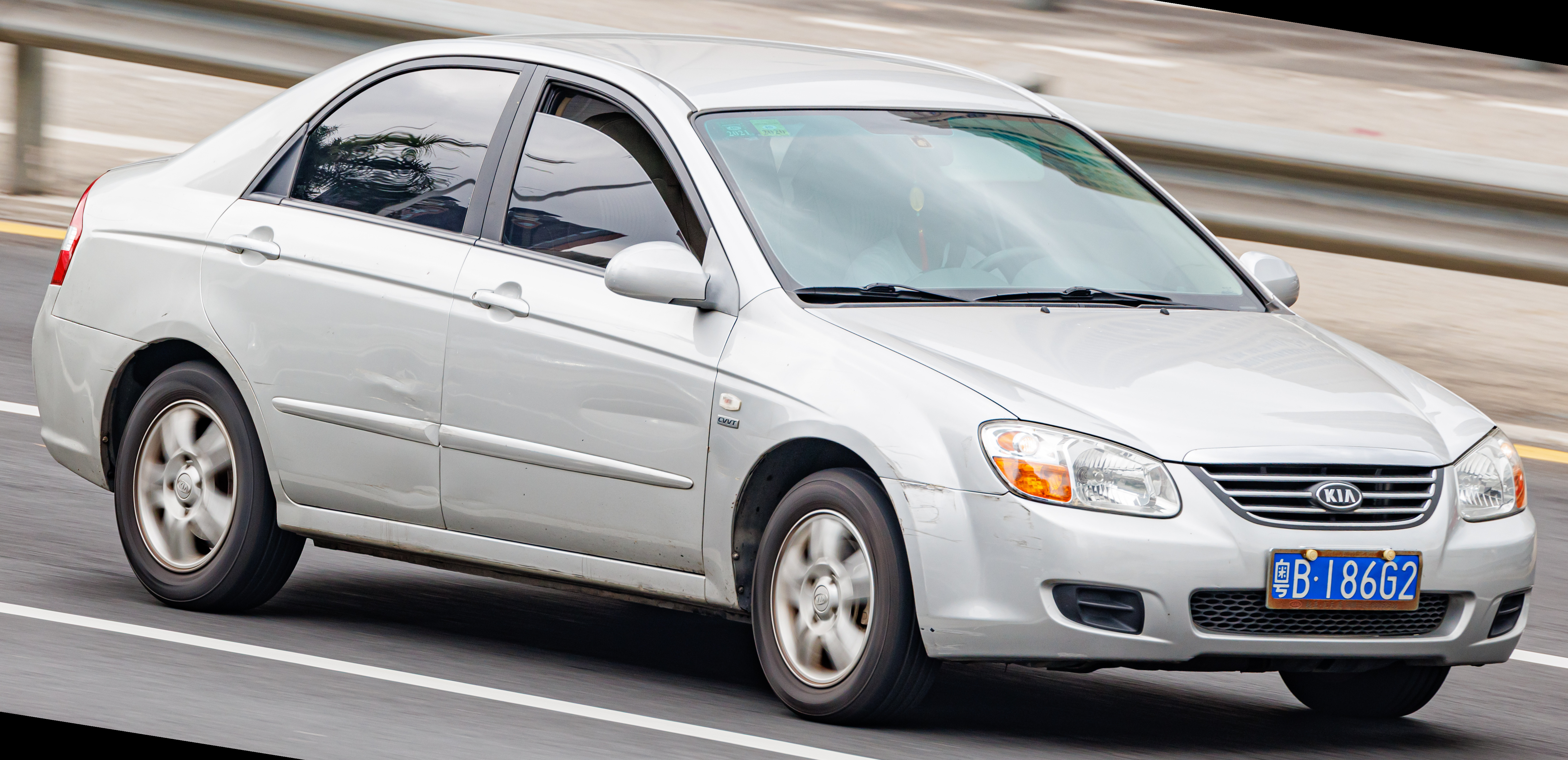
Kia Cerato

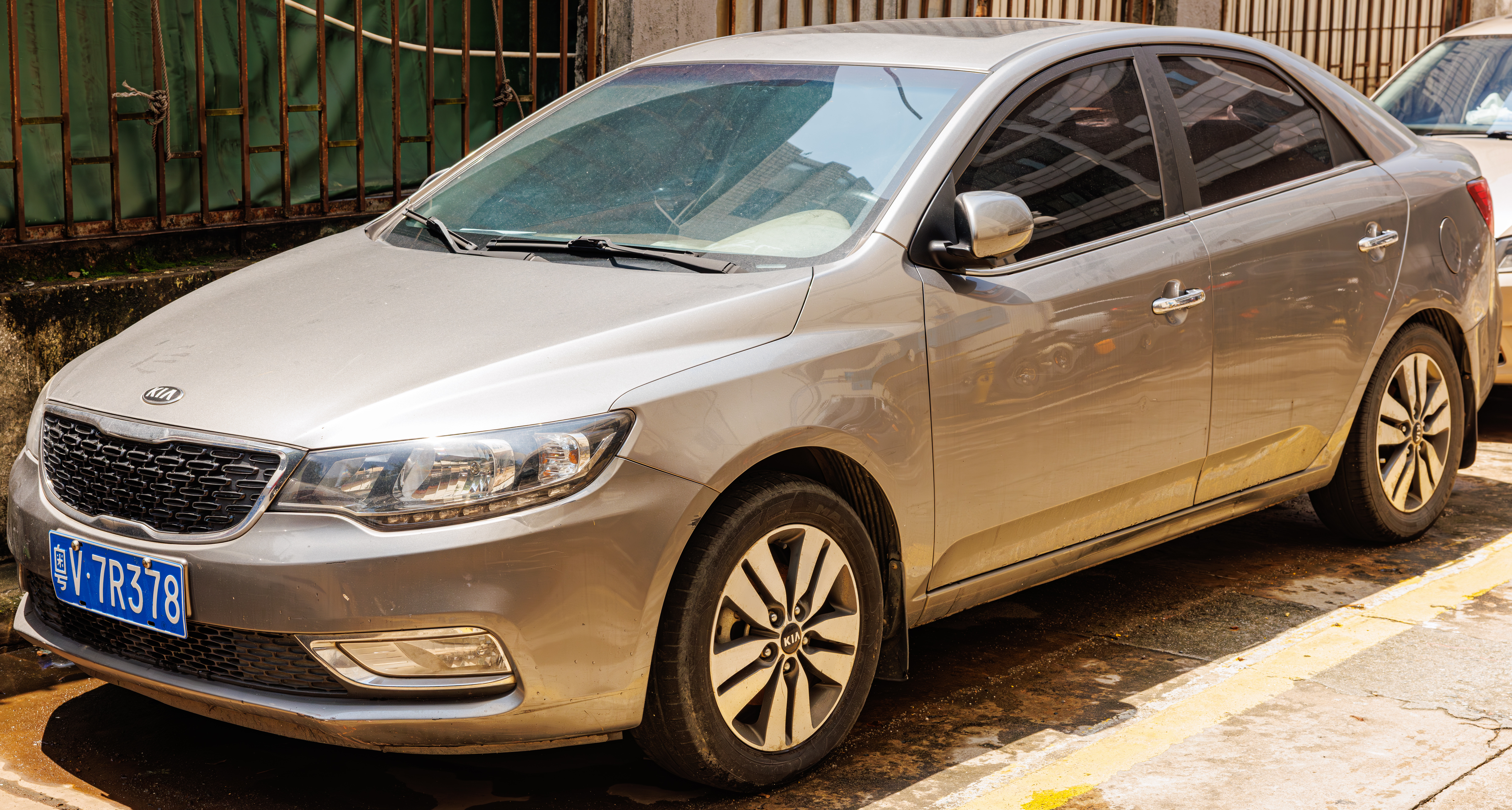
Kia Forte R

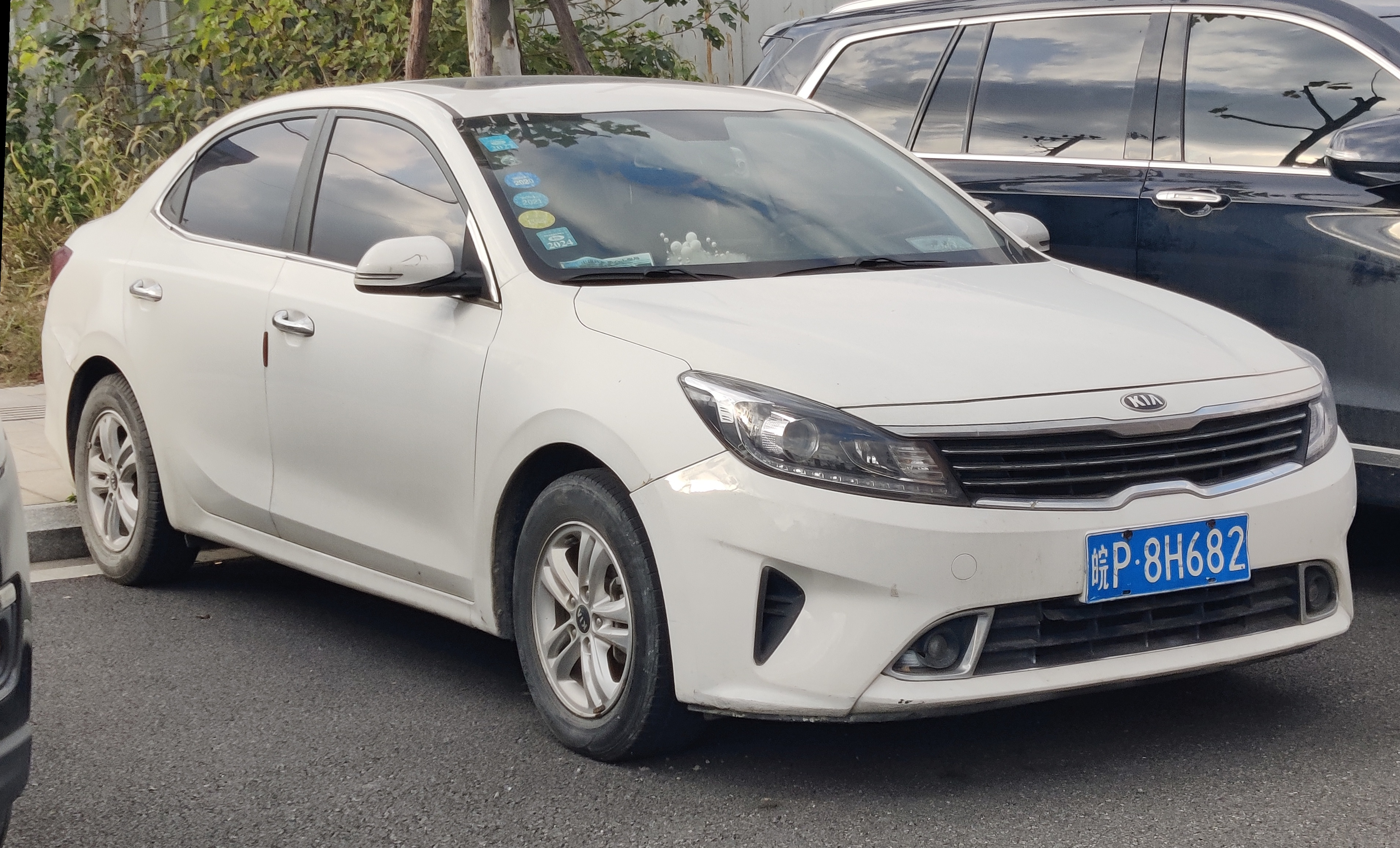
Kia Forte Furuidi

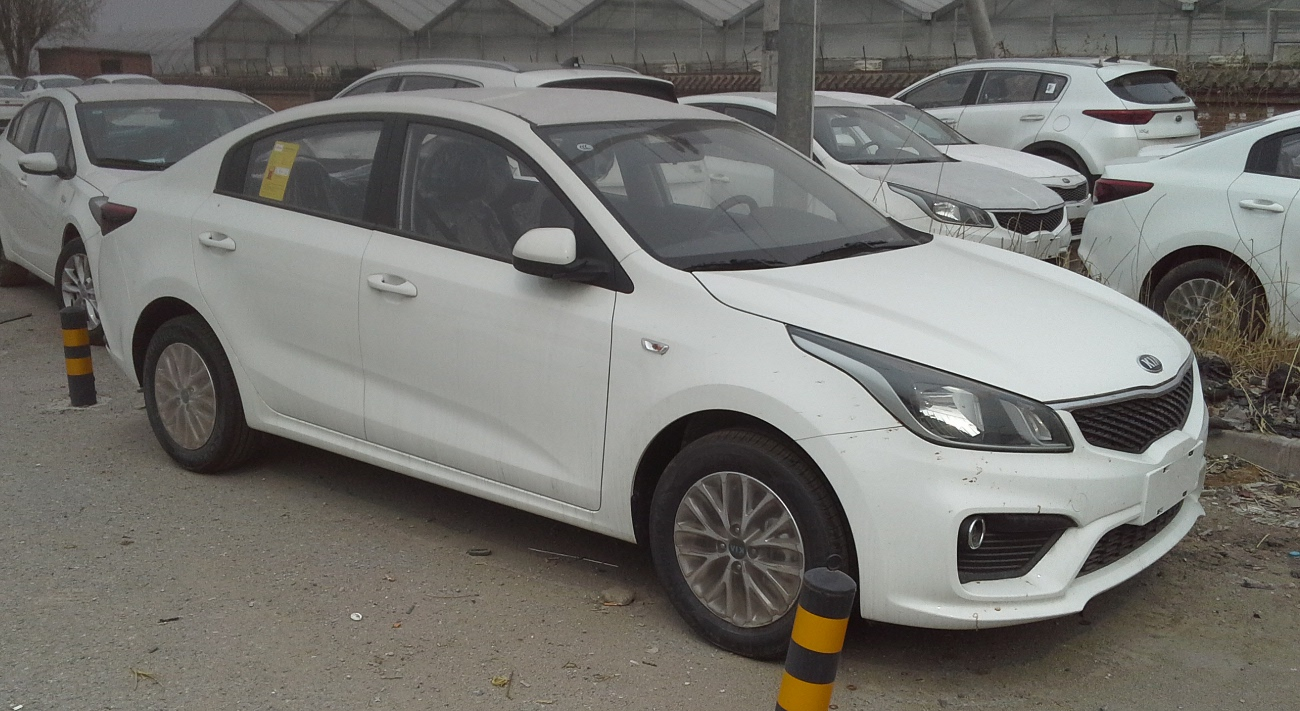
Kia K2

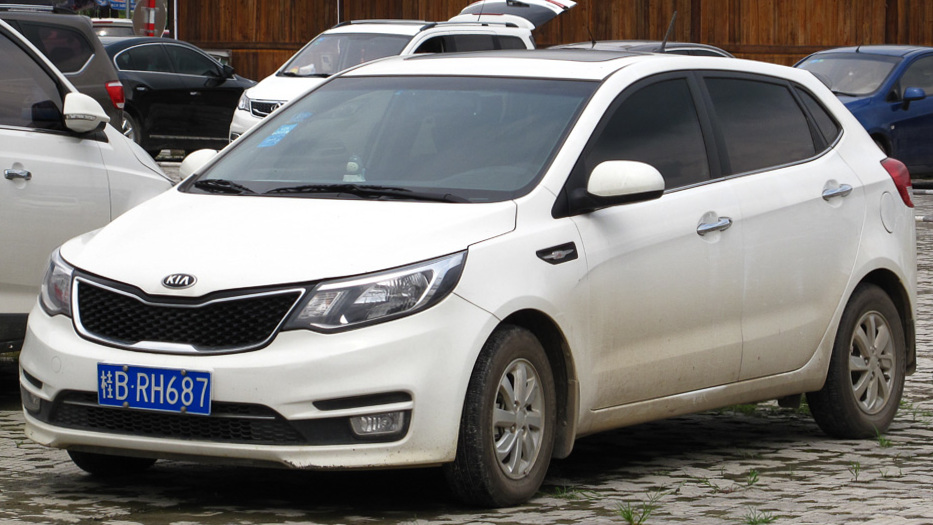
Kia K2 hatchback

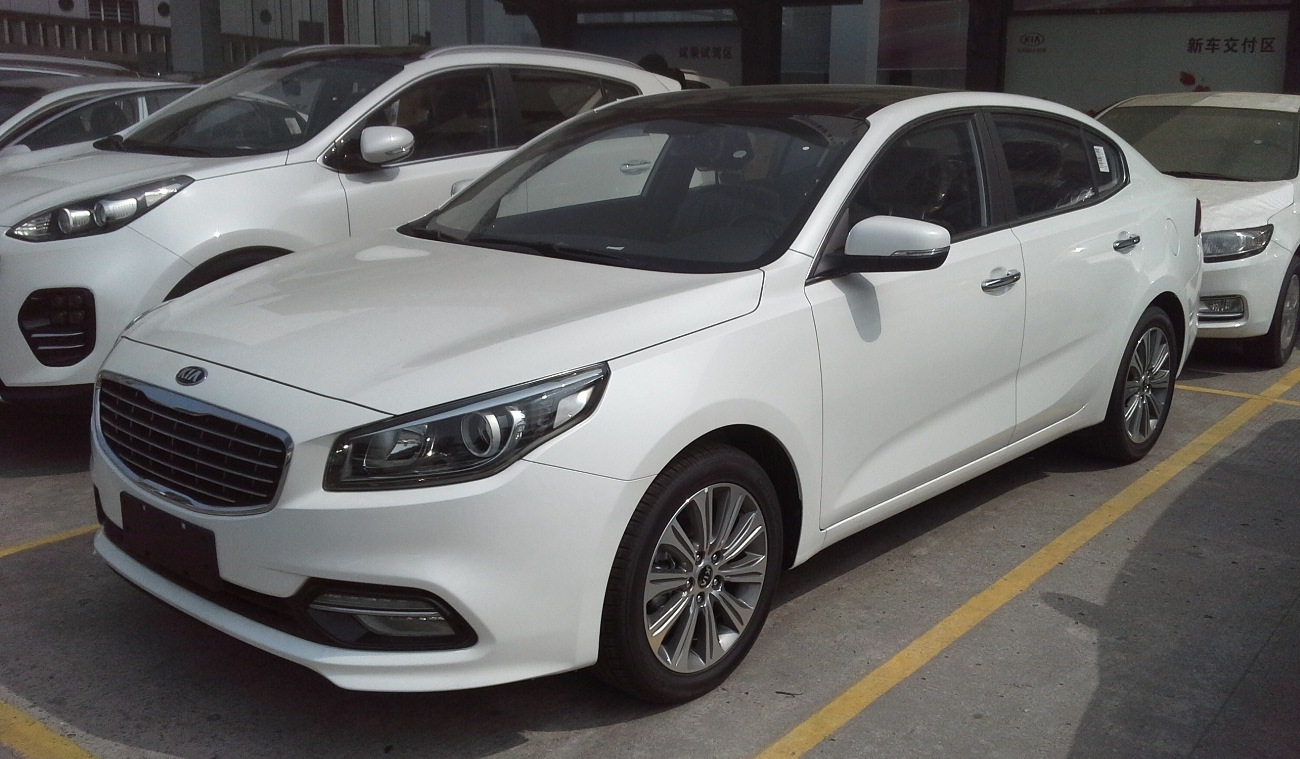
Kia K4

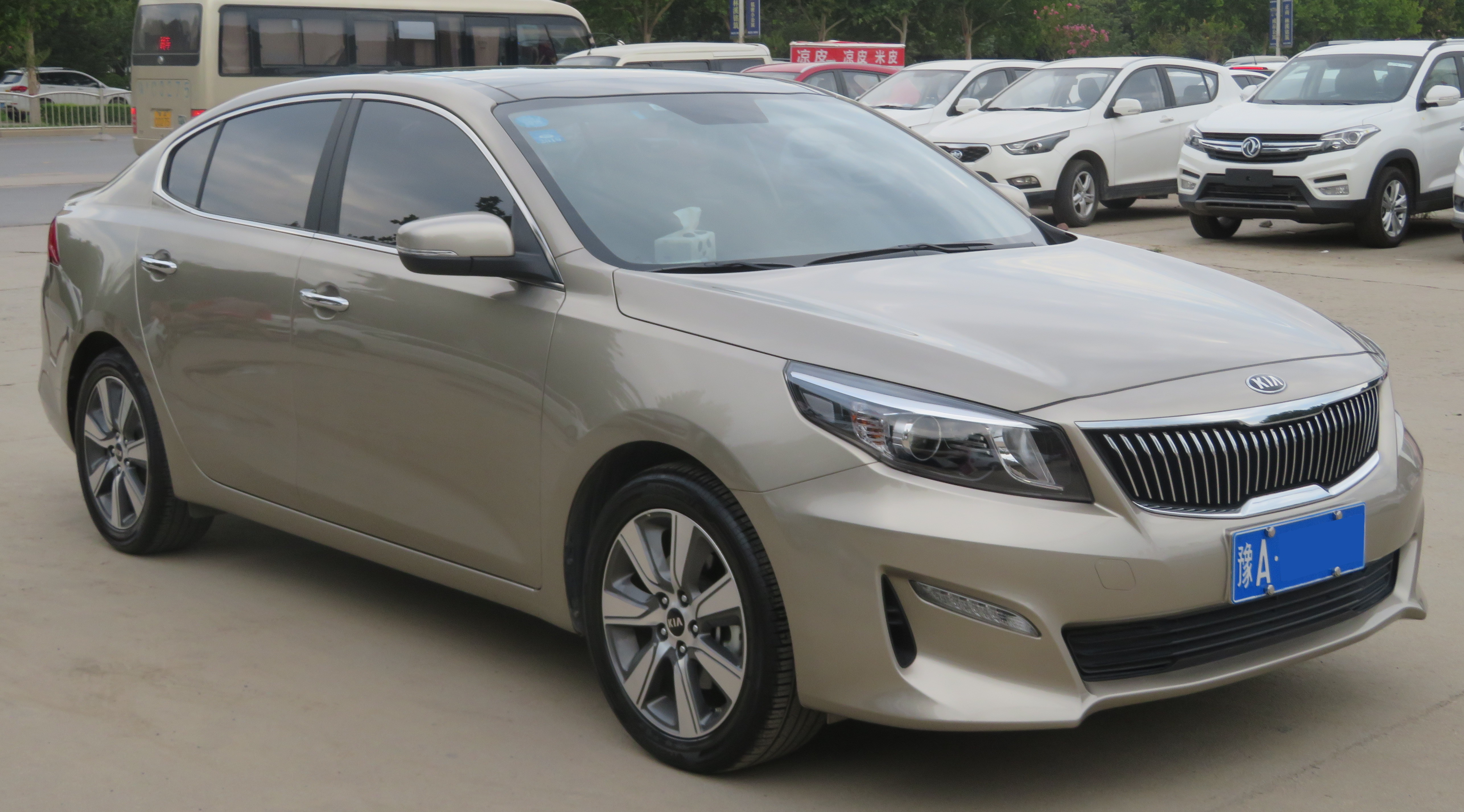
Kia K4 Cachat

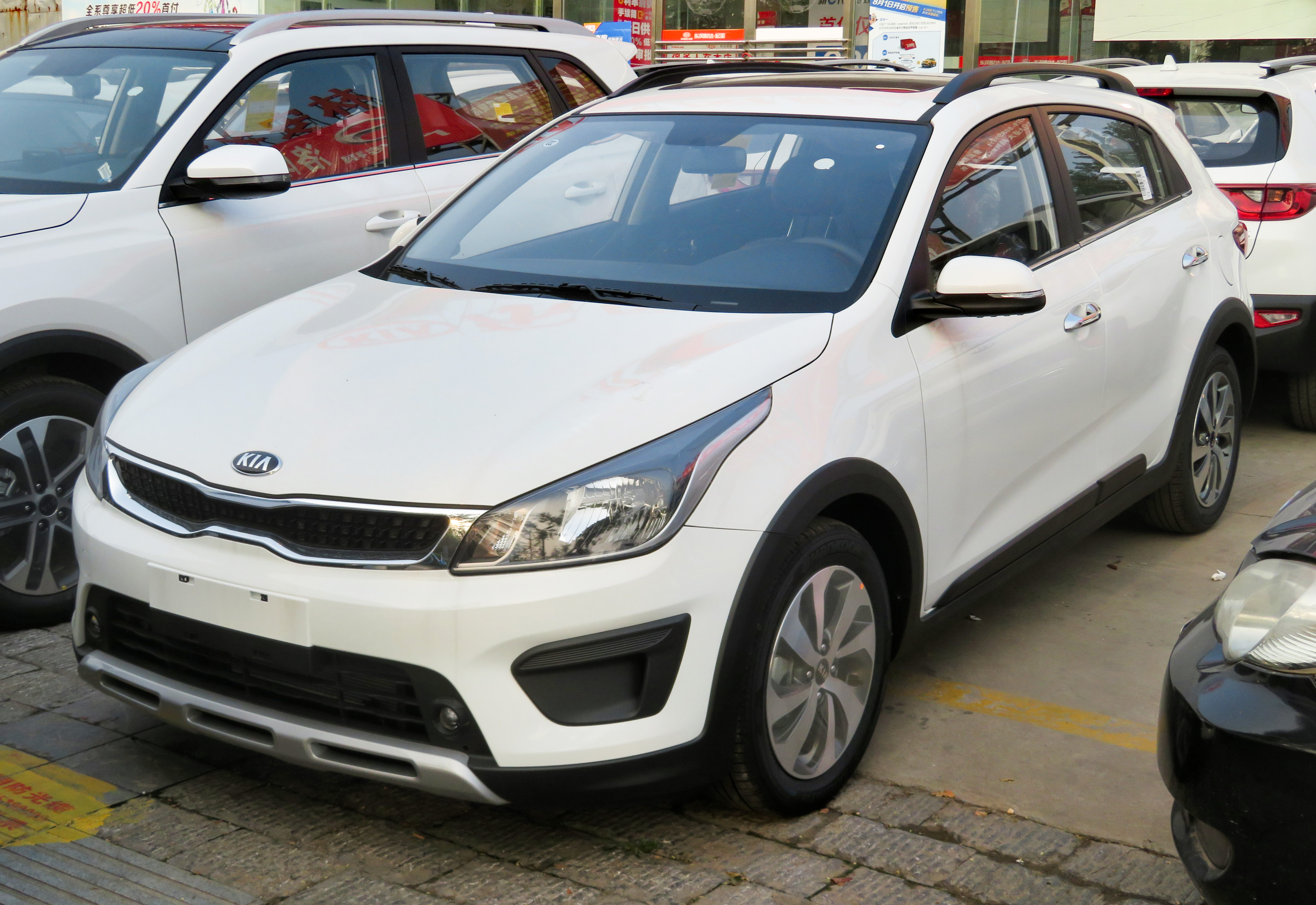
Kia KX Cross

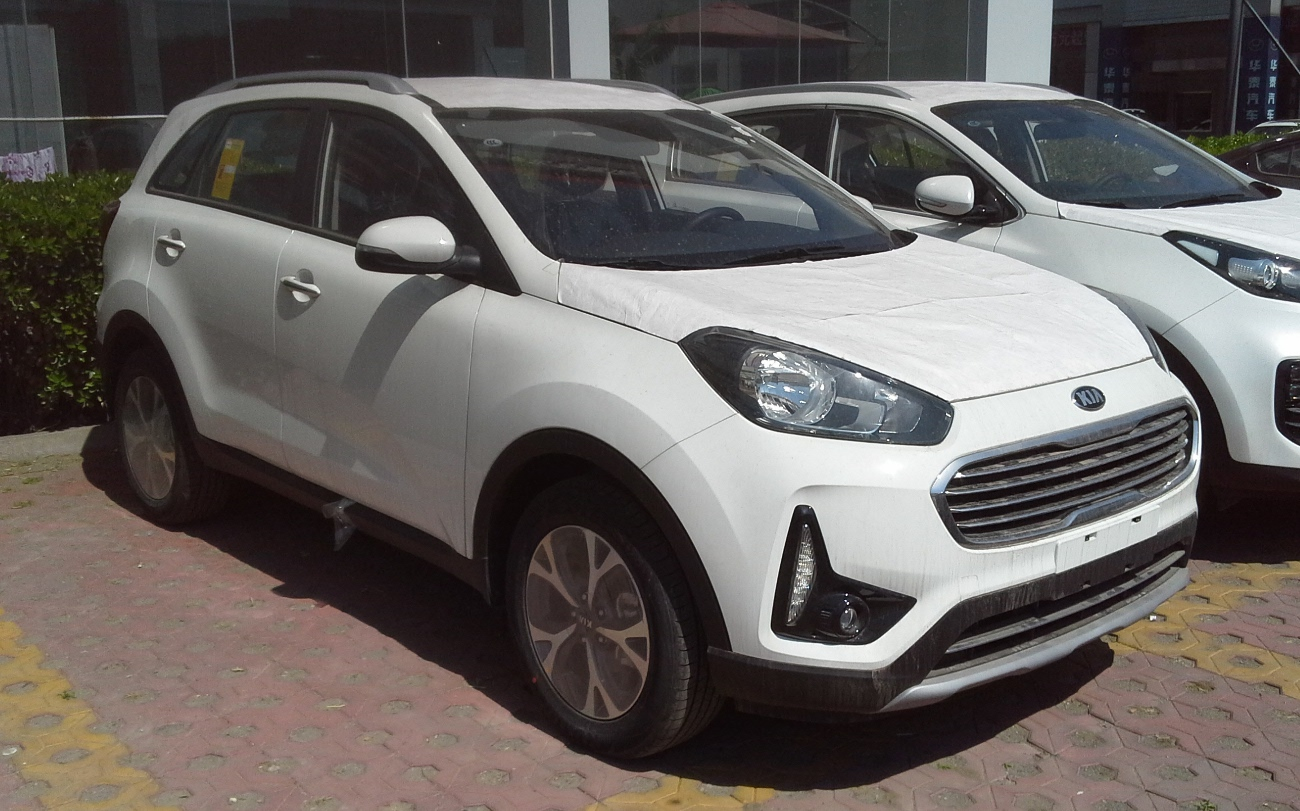
Kia KX3

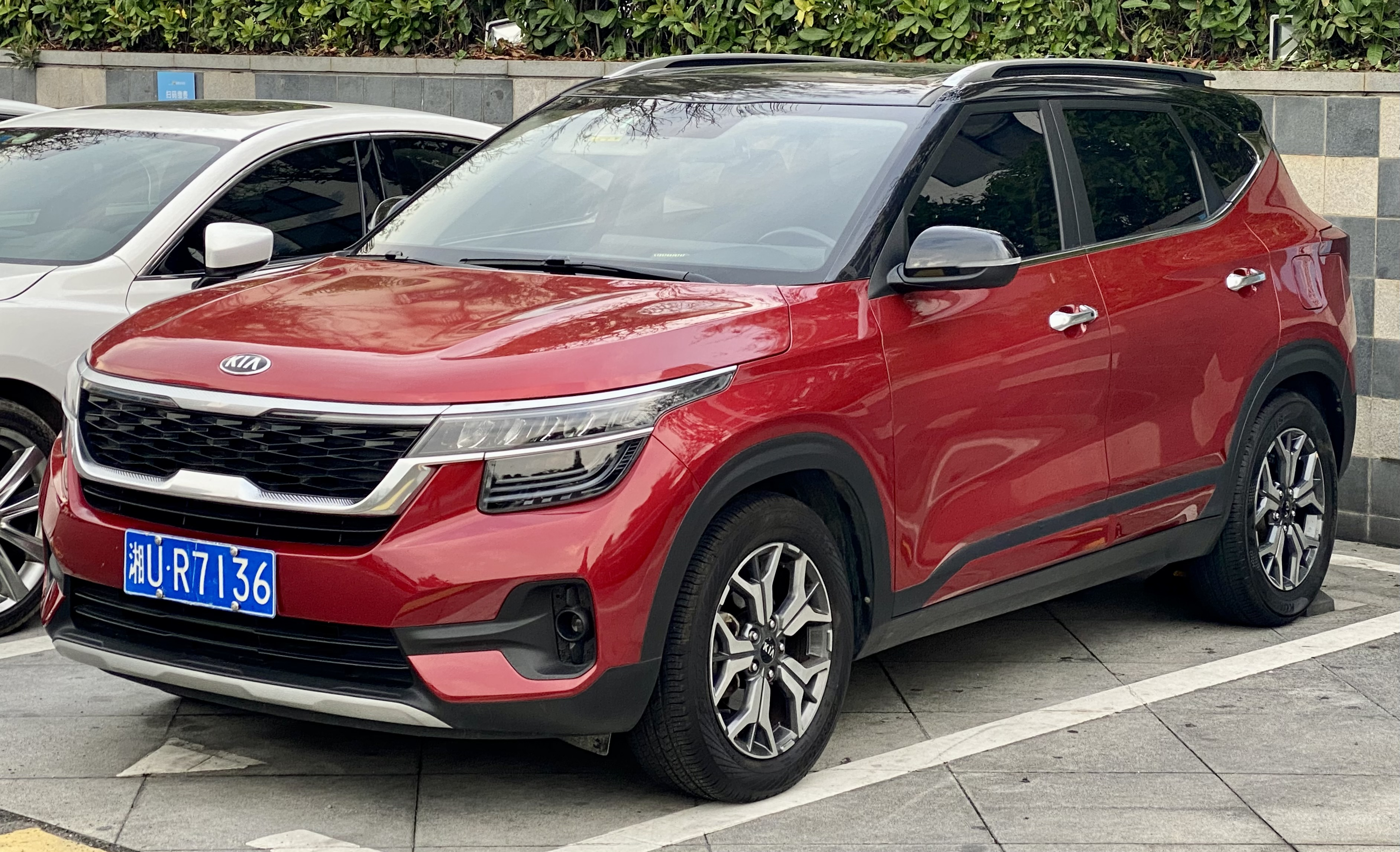
Kia KX3 Aopao

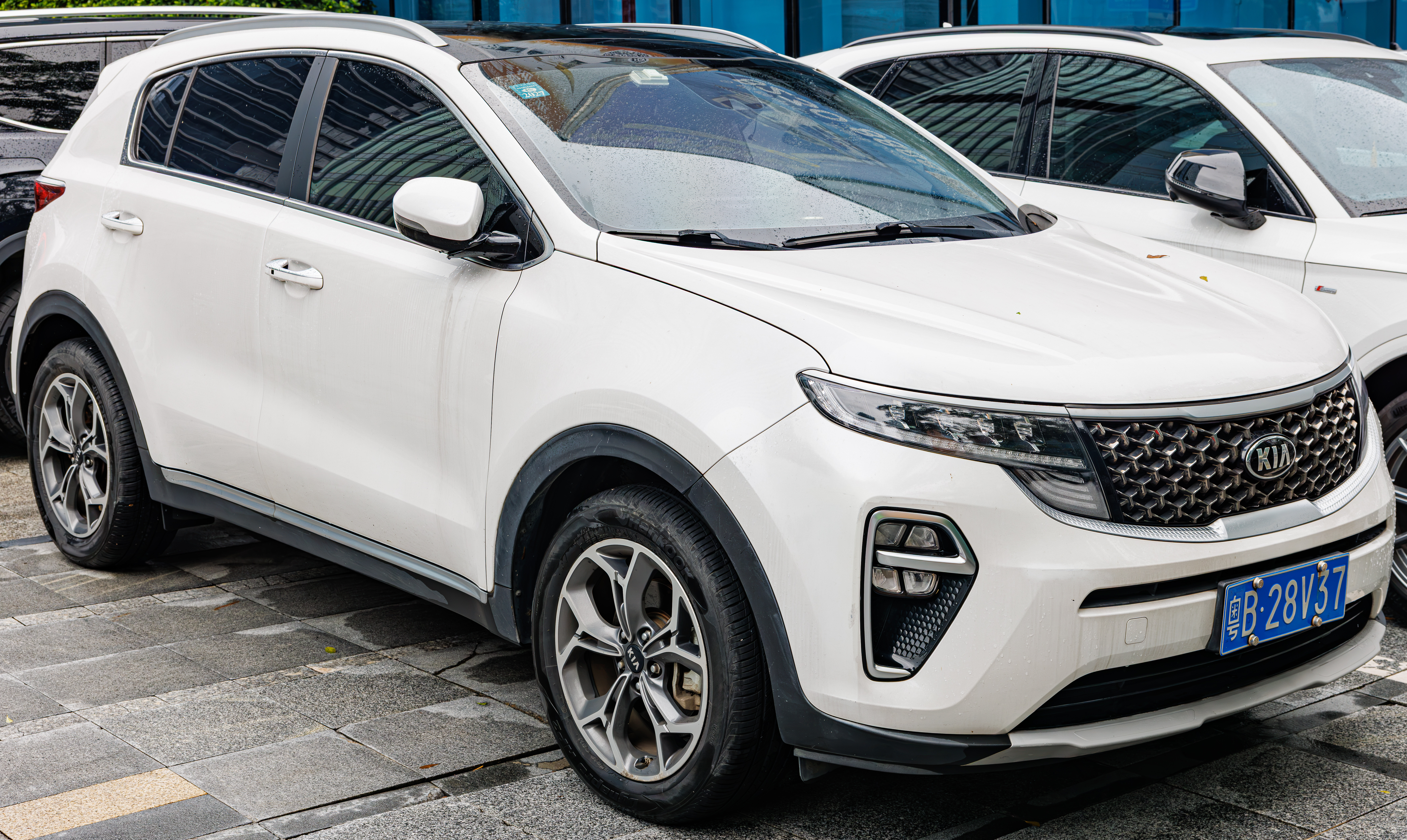
Kia KX5

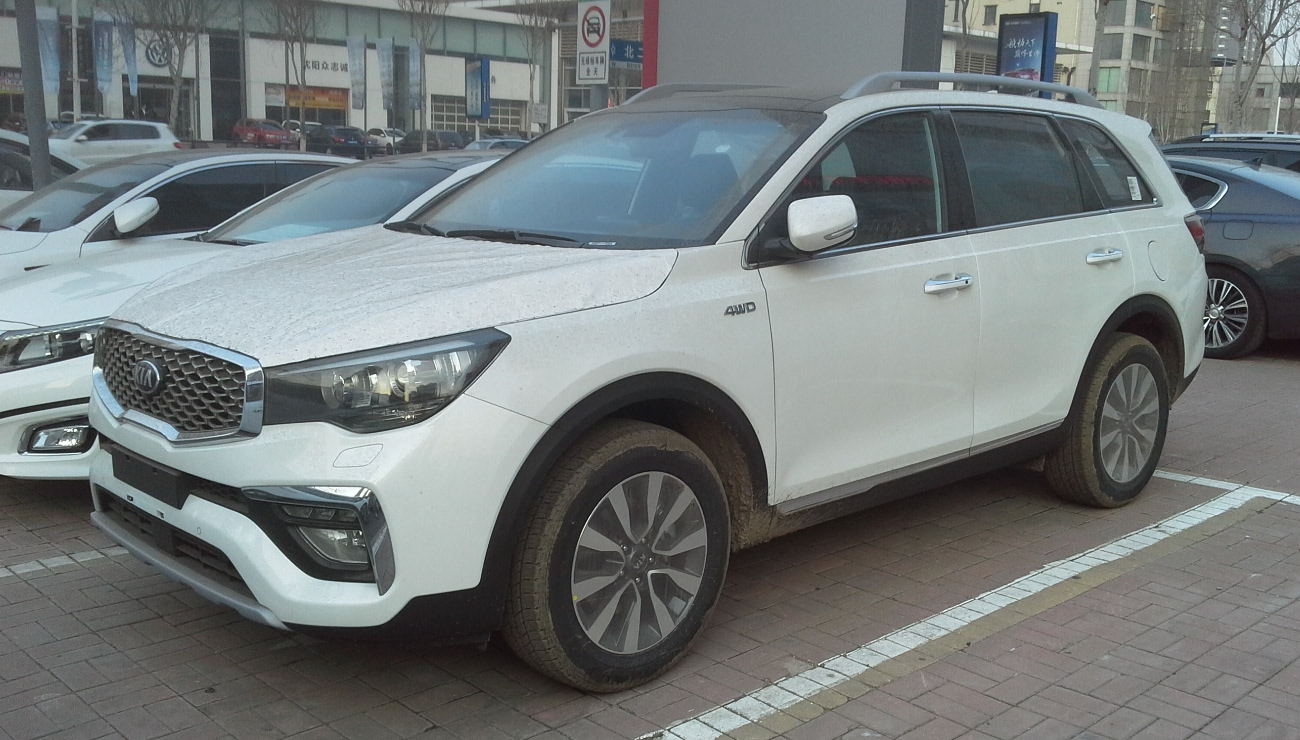
Kia KX7

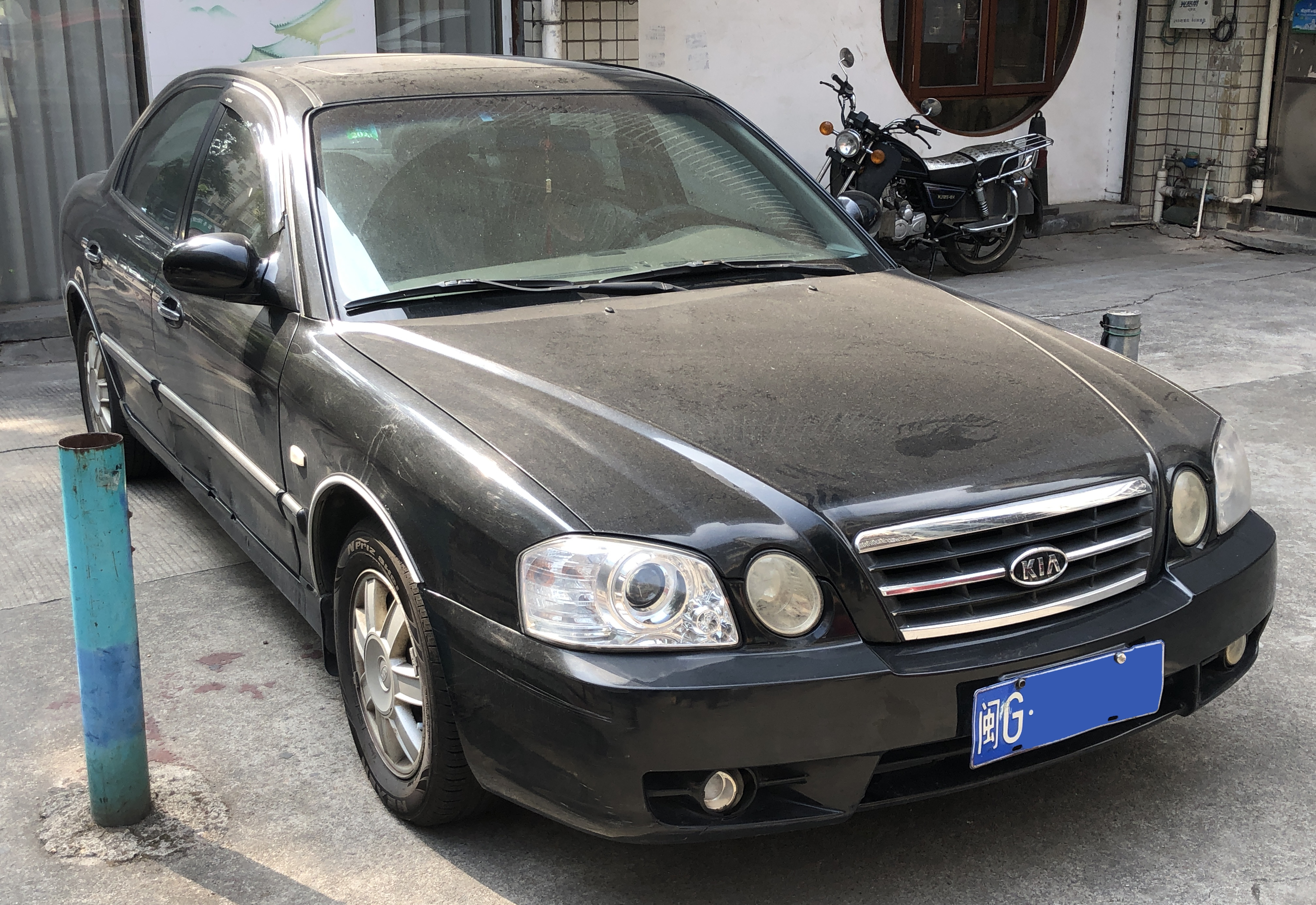
Kia Optima

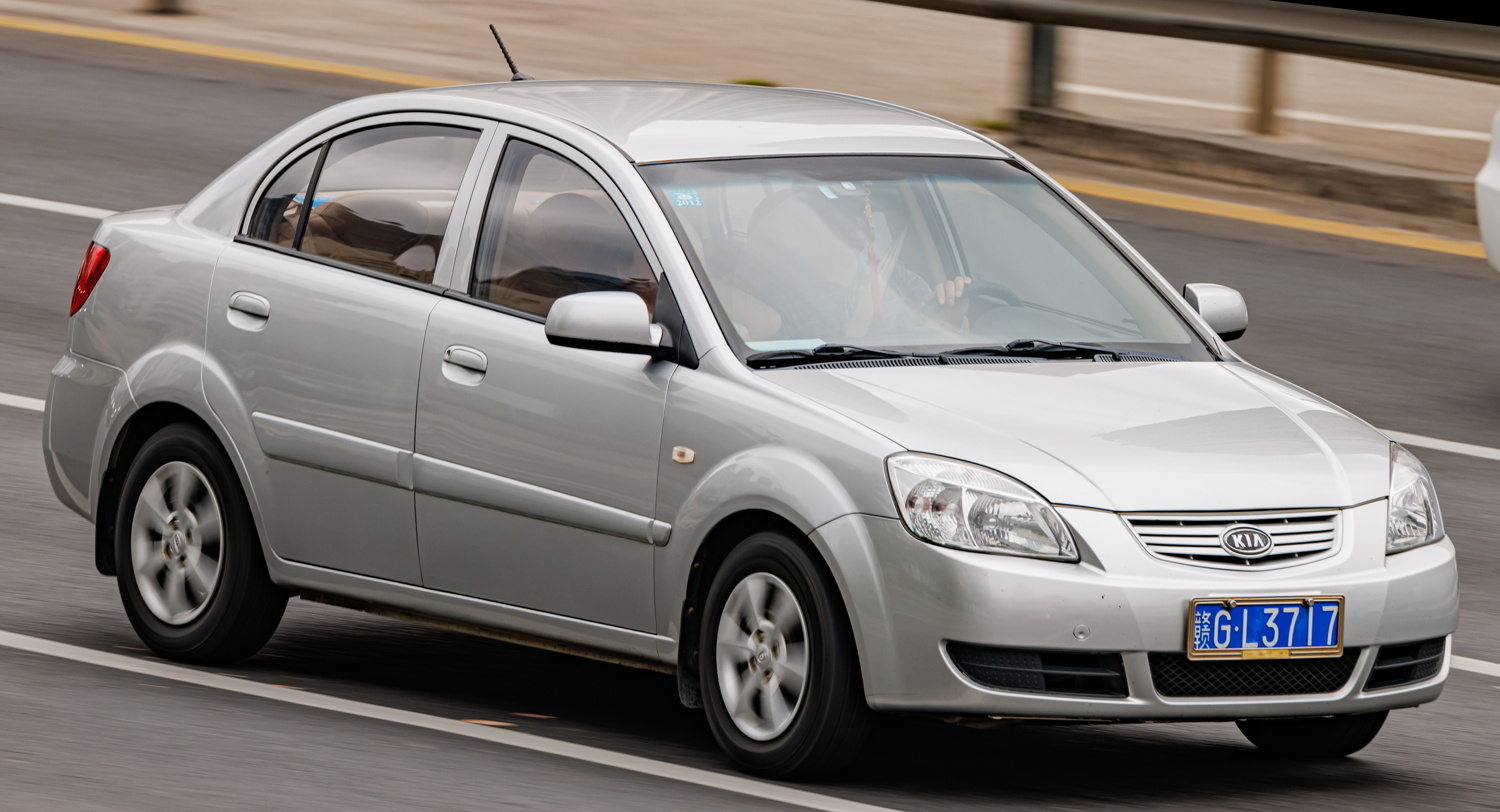
Kia Rio

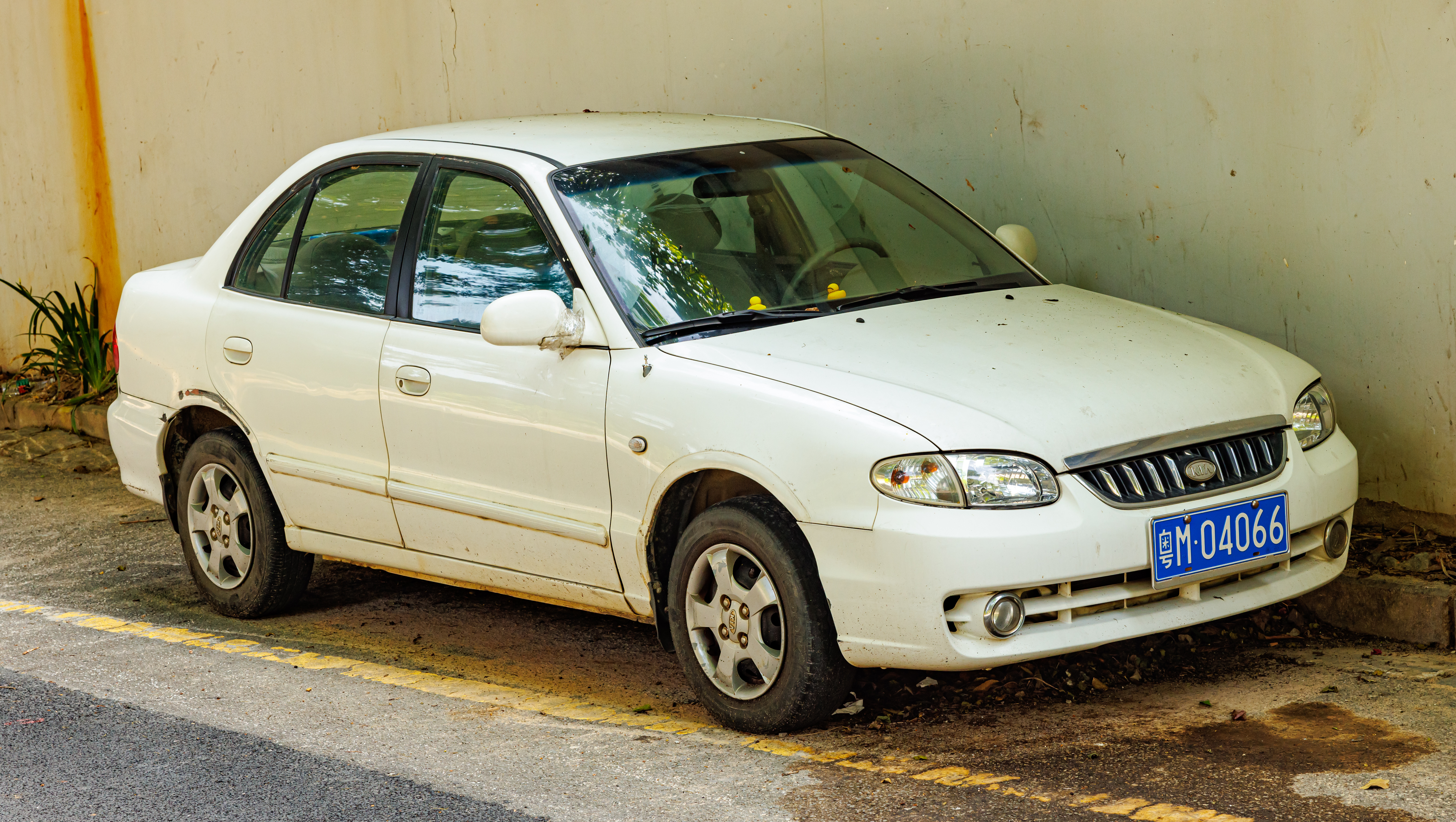
Kia Qianlima

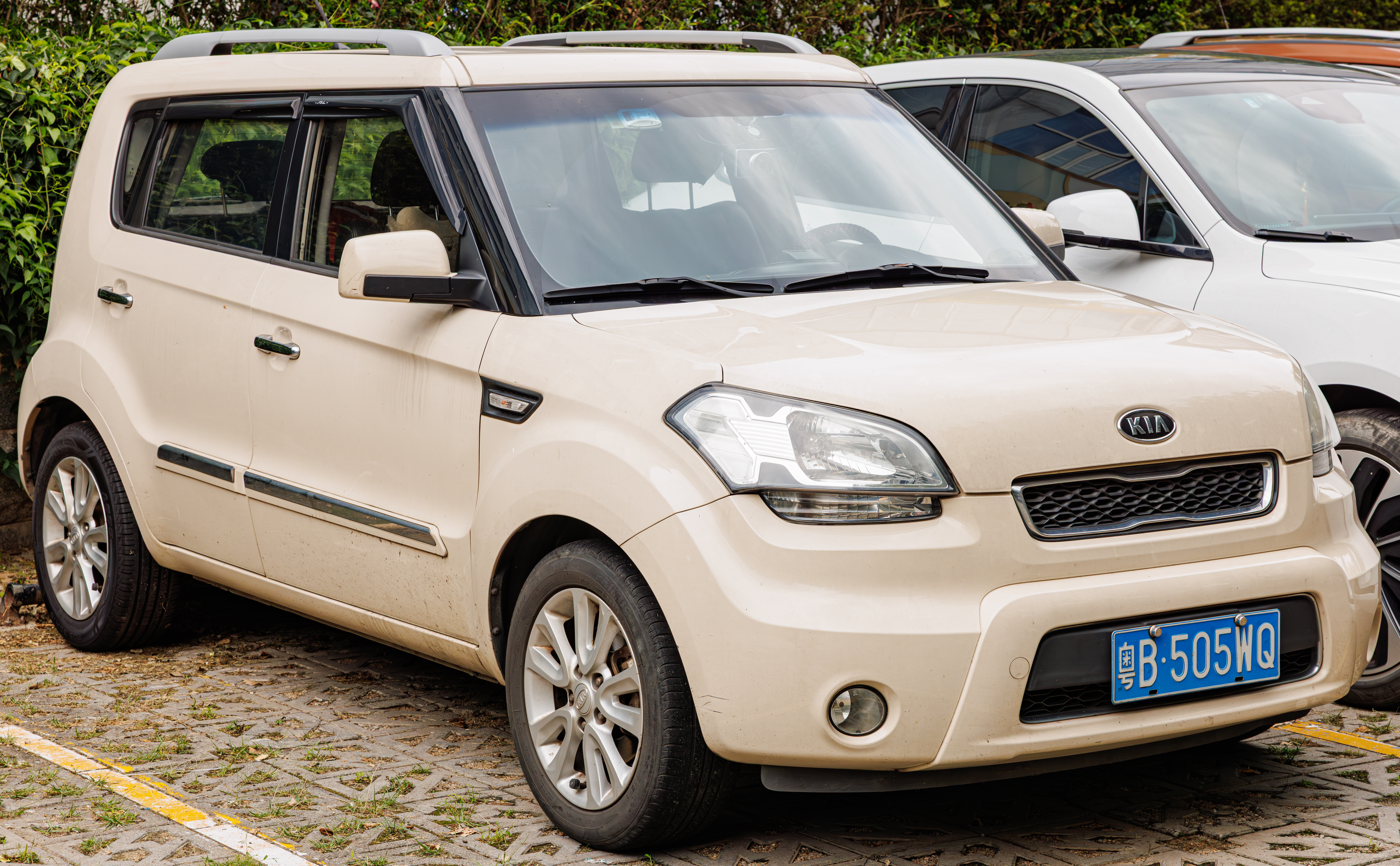
Kia Soul
