= Kia KX7 =

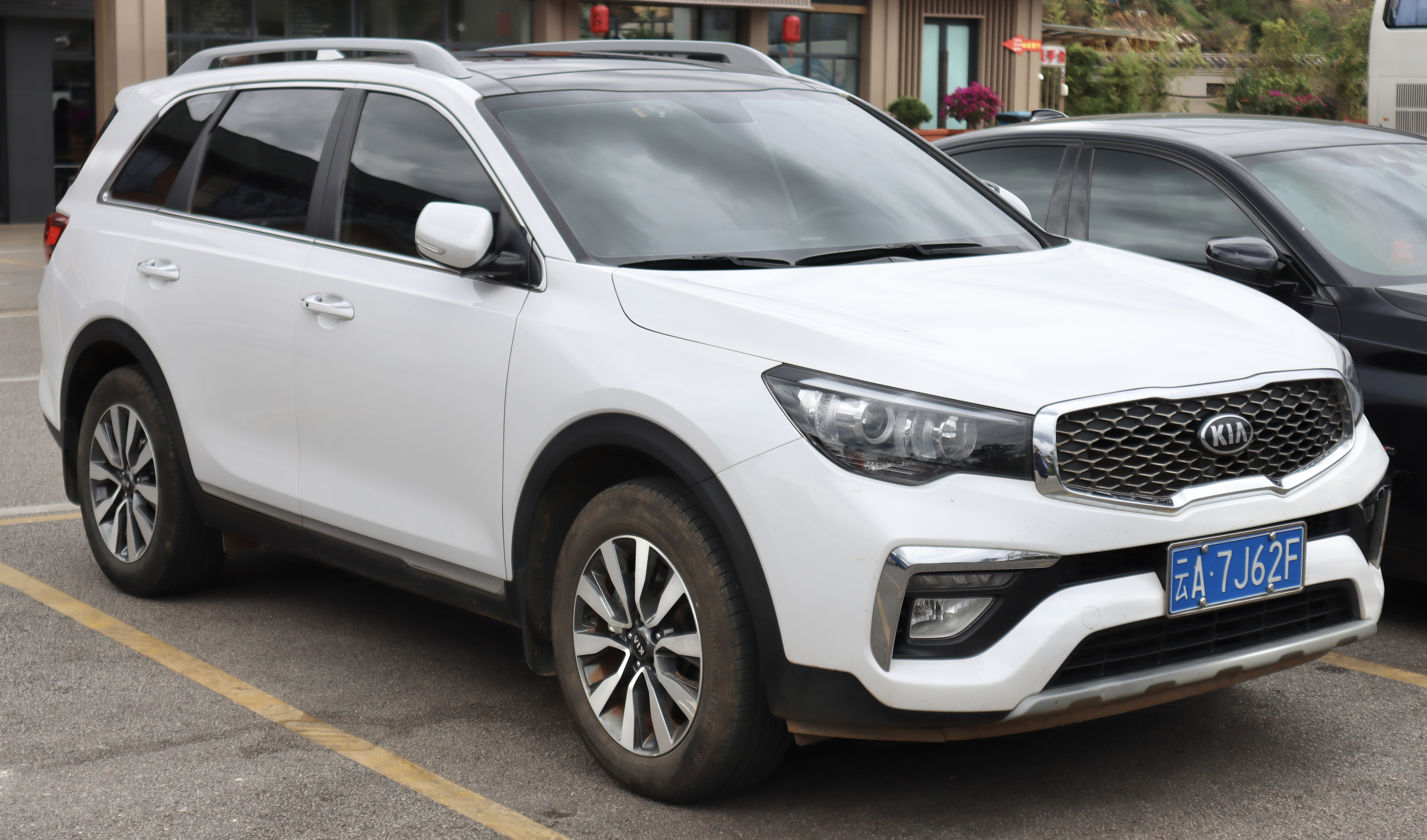

Overview
- Manufacturer: Kia
- Production: 2017–2021
- Assembly: China: Yancheng (DYK)

Body and chassis
- Class: Mid-size crossover SUV
- Body style: 5-door SUV
- Layout: Front-engine, front-wheel-drive; Front-engine, all-wheel-drive
- Related: Kia Sorento (UM); Hyundai Santa Fe (DM)

Powertrain
- Engine: Petrol: 2.0 L Nu GDi I4; 2.0 L Theta II T-GDi I4; 2.4 L Theta II GDi I4
- Transmission: 6-speed manual; 6-speed automatic

Dimensions
- Wheelbase: 2,780 mm (109.4 in)
- Length: 4,730 mm (186.2 in)
- Width: 1,890 mm (74.4 in)
- Height: 1,730 mm (68.1 in)

The Kia KX7 is a three-row mid-size crossover SUV produced in China from 2017 to 2021 by Dongfeng Yueda Kia.

== Overview ==
The Kia KX7 crossover was unveiled on the 2016 Guangzhou Auto Show in China, and became available to the Chinese market on March 16, 2017. The KX7 is based on the third-generation Kia Sorento which remains an import in the Chinese market with it providing a more affordable option. It is produced in China by the Dongfeng-Yueda-Kia joint venture, and adapts the same engines from the Sorento, both mated to a six-speed manual or a six-speed automatic with optional 4WD.

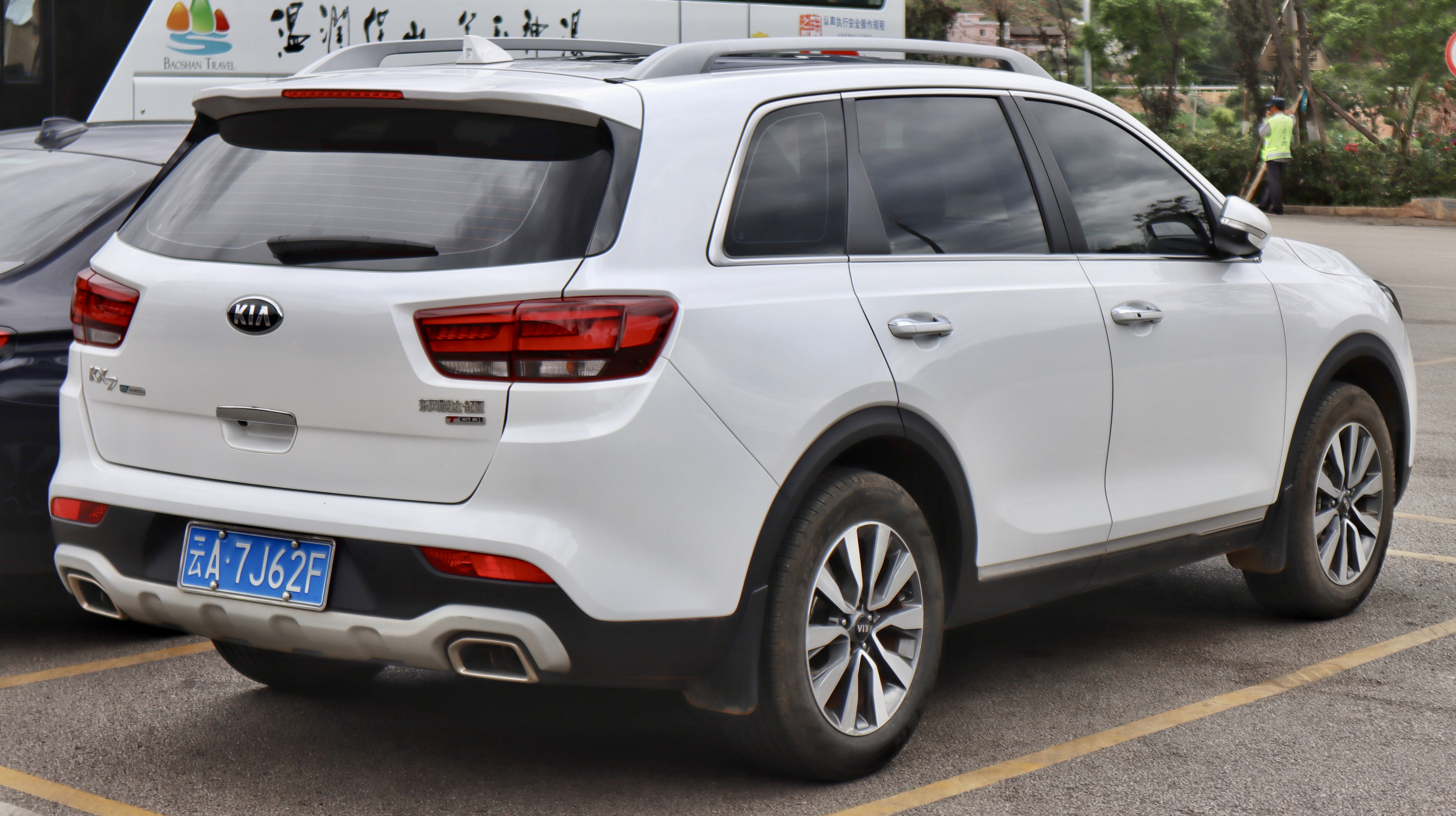
Rear view
